= Live Tour 2019 Re(live): Japonesque =

Live Tour 2019 re(Live) -Japonesque-

Video by Koda Kumi
- Released: March 11, 2020
- Recorded: 2019
- Genre: Pop, R&B, J-pop, dance-pop, rock
- Label: Rhythm Zone; 2DVD (RZBD-77092~3); Blu-ray (RZXD-77094); Loppi Limited (RZB1-77098~100/B~C); Fanclub (RZB1-77101~3/B~C)
- Producer: Koda Kumi

Koda Kumi chronology
Live Tour 2019 re(Live) -Black Cherry- (2020)	Live Tour 2019 re(Live) -Japonesque- (2020)	20th Anniversary Tour 2020 My Name Is... (2021)

Koda Kumi Live Tour 2019 re(Live) -Japonesque- (stylized as KODA KUMI LIVE TOUR 2019 re(LIVE) -JAPONESQUE-) is a live concert video released by Japanese singer-songwriter Koda Kumi on March 11, 2020. It was released the same day as her live DVD Koda Kumi Live Tour 2019 re(Live) -Black Cherry-, since both concerts were performed alongside each other during her 2019 touring. The DVD charted at No. 11 on the Oricon weekly charts, while the Blu-ray charted at No. 16.

The video was released as 2DVD and Blu-ray. A limited 3DVD+2CD edition was also released to her fan club and to HMV stores, which was a combo of both tours, along with two remix CDs and a bonus DVD featuring her anniversary concert and previously unreleased music videos.

== Information ==
Koda Kumi Live Tour 2019 re(Live) -Japonesque- is the twentieth concert video released by Japanese artist Koda Kumi. It was released on March 11, 2020 as a 2DVD combo and Blu-ray, charting at No. 11 on the Oricon DVD Charts and No. 16 on the Oricon Blu-ray Charts. It was released as a 2DVD combo pack and on Blu-ray. A limited edition 3DVD+2CD combo pack was released through her official fan club Koda Gumi and through HMV stores nationwide. The video was released the same day as her DVD/Blu-ray Live Tour 2019 re(Live) -Black Cherry- and her remix album Re(mix).

As the title suggests, the tour consisted predominantly of songs from her tenth studio album Japonesque, along with re-imagined visuals that had corresponded with her tour Koda Kumi Live Tour 2013 ~Japonesque~ seven years prior. Towards the end of the concert, she performed the songs "Shutout", "Do Me", "k", "Eh Yo", "OMG", "Goldfinger 2019" and "Livin' La Vida Loca" from her studio album Re(cord) (2019). For the encore, she performed her famous song "walk", which she had used to close out the majority of her tours since her debut.

The 3DVD+2CD edition featured both Live Tour 2019 re(Live) -Black Cherry- and Live Tour 2019 re(Live) -Japonesque- between the first two DVDs, and her 19th→20th Anniversary Event (stylized 19TH→20TH ANNIVERSARY EVENT) on the third DVD. The third DVD also featured previously unreleased music videos for "Get Naked", "Strip" and "Shutout". The CDs contained nonstop remixes of the albums Black Cherry and Japonesque. iamSHUM remixed the songs for Black Cherry, and REMO-CON (Tetsuya Tamura) remixed the songs for Japonesque. The 19th→20th Anniversary Event was performed at Zepp DiverCity in Tokyo on December 6, 2019.

== Track listing ==
=== 2DVD/Blu-ray ===
DVD1: Live Tour 2019 re(Live) -Japonesque-
No.	Title	Length
1.	"<Opening>"
2.	"So Nice"
3.	"D.D.D."
4.	"Jounetsu"
5.	"Ai o Tomenaide"
6.	"Sayonara no Mukogawa"
7.	"<Interlude Movie 1>"
8.	"KO-SO-KO-SO"
9.	"<Interlude Movie 2>"
10.	"<Dancers in Action>"
11.	"V.I.P"
12.	"Pink Spider"
13.	"Escalate"
14.	"Slow"
15.	"Koishikute"
16.	"Brave"
17.	"In The Air"
18.	"<Interlude Movie 3>" "Strip"
19.	"Get Naked"
20.	"Do Me" "<Dancers Introduction>"
21.	"k,"
22.	"Eh Yo"
23.	"Goldfinger 2019 / Livin' La Vida Loca"
24.	"OMG"
25.	"<Encore>" "Put Your Hands Up!!!" "walk"
Total length:		106:15

DVD2: Behind-the-Scenes
No.	Title	Length
1.	"Koda Kumi Live Tour 2019 re(Live) -Black Cherry- & -Japonesque-" (Behind the Scenes) (Volume 1)	31:00

Blu-ray: Live Tour 2019 re(Live) -Japonesque-
No.	Title	Length
1.	"<Opening>"
2.	"So Nice"
3.	"D.D.D."
4.	"Jounetsu"
5.	"Ai o Tomenaide"
6.	"Sayonara no Mukogawa"
7.	"<Interlude Movie 1>"
8.	"KO-SO-KO-SO"
9.	"<Interlude Movie 2>"
10.	"<Dancers in Action>"
11.	"V.I.P"
12.	"Pink Spider"
13.	"Escalate"
14.	"Slow"
15.	"Koishikute"
16.	"Brave"
17.	"In The Air"
18.	"<Interlude Movie 3>" "Strip"
19.	"Get Naked"
20.	"Do Me" "<Dancers Introduction>"
21.	"k,"
22.	"Eh Yo"
23.	"Goldfinger 2019 / Livin' La Vida Loca"
24.	"OMG"
25.	"<Encore>" "Put Your Hands Up!!!" "walk"
26.	"Koda Kumi Live Tour 2019 re(Live) -Black Cherry- & -Japonesque-" (Behind the Scenes) (Volume 1)	31:00
Total length:		137:15

=== Fanclub/HMV edition ===
DVD1: Live Tour 2019 re(Live) -Black Cherry-
No.	Title	Length
1.	"<Opening>"
2.	"Black Cherry"
3.	"Cherry Girl"
4.	"Cutie Honey"
5.	"Tsuki to Taiyou"
6.	"Yume no Uta"
7.	"<Interlude Movie 1>"
8.	"Heat"
9.	"Break it down"
10.	"<Interlude Movie 2>"
11.	"<Dancers in Action>"
12.	"Candle Light"
13.	"Unmei"
14.	"Milk Tea"
15.	"Koi no Tsubomi"
16.	"Twinkle"
17.	"<Interlude Movie 3>" "Shutout"
18.	"Get Naked"
19.	"Do Me" "<Dancers Introduction>"
20.	"k,"
21.	"Eh Yo"
22.	"Goldfinger 2019 / Livin' La Vida Loca"
23.	"OMG"
24.	"<Encore>" "Put Your Hands Up!!!" "Walk of My Life"
26.	"Audio Commentary Version" (Koda Kumi / mucho! / Tomoyuki Onishi / SHOWKO / AKIHIRO)
Total length:		106:15

DVD2: Live Tour 2019 re(Live) -Japonesque-
No.	Title	Length
1.	"<Opening>"
2.	"So Nice"
3.	"D.D.D."
4.	"Jounetsu"
5.	"Ai o Tomenaide"
6.	"Sayonara no Mukogawa"
7.	"<Interlude Movie 1>"
8.	"KO-SO-KO-SO"
9.	"<Interlude Movie 2>"
10.	"<Dancers in Action>"
11.	"V.I.P"
12.	"Pink Spider"
13.	"Escalate"
14.	"Slow"
15.	"Koishikute"
16.	"Brave"
17.	"In The Air"
18.	"<Interlude Movie 3>" "Strip"
19.	"Get Naked"
20.	"Do Me" "<Dancers Introduction>"
21.	"k,"
22.	"Eh Yo"
23.	"Goldfinger 2019 / Livin' La Vida Loca"
24.	"OMG"
25.	"<Encore>" "Put Your Hands Up!!!" "walk"
26.	"Audio Commentary Version" (Koda Kumi / mucho! / Tomoyuki Onishi / SHOWKO / AKIHIRO)
Total length:		106:15

DVD3: Documentary Movie
No.	Title	Length
1.	"Behind the Scenes"	79:53
2.	"Koda Kumi 19th→20th Anniversary Event; Part 1: -Medley-; Step into My World; Universe; Ecstasy; Hashire!; Ai no Kotoba; Rain; You're So Beautiful; Pop Diva; Comes Up Part2; -Medley-; Introduction for Trick; Driving; show girl; Shake It; This is not a love song; Your Love; House Party; Lippy; Dance in the Rain; Walk of My Life; Life so Good!!; -MC-; again"	36:39
3.	"Get Naked" (Music Video)	3:32
4.	"Strip" (Music Video)	3:43
5.	"Shutout" (Music Video)	3:54
6.	"MC; Black Cherry (2019.10.13); Japonesque (2013.10.14)"	6:02

CD1: Black Cherry (iamSHUM Non-Stop Mix)
No.	Title	Length
1.	"Black Cherry" (iamSHUM Non-Stop Mix)	60:15

CD2: Japonesque (REMO-CON Non-Stop Mix)
No.	Title	Length
1.	"Japonesque" (REMO-CON Non-Stop Mix)	60:10

== Charts ==
Release	Chart	Peak position
March 11, 2020	Oricon DVD Chart	11
March 11, 2020	Oricon Blu-ray Chart	16
