= Koda Kumi Driving Hit's 9 =

Koda Kumi Driving Hit's 9: Special Edition

Remix album by Koda Kumi
- Released: February 20, 2019
- Recorded: 2018 (vocals), 2019 (melodies)
- Genre: Drum and bass; dubstep; house
- Length: 56:27 (disc 1); 52:17 (disc 2); 67:32 (disc 3)
- Language: Japanese
- Label: Rhythm Zone

Koda Kumi chronology
DNA (2018)	Koda Kumi Driving Hit's 9: Special Edition (2019)	Re(cord) (2019)

Koda Kumi Driving Hit's 9: Special Edition is the eleventh remix album released by Japanese singer-songwriter Koda Kumi, and ninth in the Driving Hit's series – the others being Koda Kumi Remix Album (2006) and Beach Mix (2012). The album was released on February 20, 2019, and peaked at No. 24 on the Oricon Albums Chart.

The album was released as a 3-disc set, with the first disc containing remixes from her studio album DNA, and second and third discs containing various songs from previous remix albums.

== Information ==
Koda Kumi Driving Hit's 9: Special Edition is the ninth Driving Hit's remix album released by Koda, and eleventh overall remix album. It debuted at No. 24 for the week.

The album was released as a three-disc set, with limited editions containing special goods, including a sun visor organizer pouch.

Many of the songs on the first disc contained remixes of songs from her 2018 studio album DNA, with only three of the fifteen tracks being remixes of prior songs. Those included were "Someday" from Best: Second Session (2006), and "I'll Be There" and "Koi no Tsubomi" from Black Cherry (2006). Artist Remo-Con became responsible for editing the songs on discs two and three into a non-stop mix. The album had two separate remixes of "Hush", track No. 2 from DNA.

While various songs from previous Driving Hit's albums were included, only one song was pulled from her first in the series, Koda Kumi Driving Hit's (2010): the Prog5 Mirrorball Remix of her 2005 song "Butterfly". Twelve remix artists performed for the album, including KATFYR, Yuto, both who worked with Koda on her prior remix album, Joe Iron, iamSHUM and Litefeet.

== Track listing ==
CD1: Driving Hit's 9
No.	Title	Length
1.	"Watch Out!! (DNA)" (KATFYR Remix)	3:28
2.	"Haircut" (Ryuki Miyamoto Remix)	3:30
3.	"Hush" (Sam Is Ohm Remix)	3:52
4.	"Dangerous" (Yuto Remix)	2:32
5.	"Aenaku Naru Kurai Nara" (Toki Remix)	4:04
6.	"Scream" (Bunny Remix)	3:45
7.	"Hot Hot" (iamSHUM Remix)	3:36
8.	"Someday" (Litefeet Remix)	4:40
9.	"I'll Be There" (Joe Iron Remix)	3:27
10.	"Koi no Tsubomi" (Adolfo De La Torre Casmartiño Remix)	3:59
11.	"Kokoro Kara I Love U" (MATZ Remix)	4:23
12.	"Guess Who Is Back" (KATFYR Remix)	3:31
13.	"Work That" (iamSHUM Remix)	4:30
14.	"Hush" (Yuto Remix)	2:51
15.	"Pin Drop" (Kiyoshi Sugo Remix)	4:19
Total length:		56:27

CD2: Uplifting Side (Non-Stop Mixed by Remo-Con)
No.	Title	Original album	Length
1.	"Party" (KATFYR Remix)	Driving Hit's 8	3:44
2.	"Freaky" (MATZ Remix)	Driving Hit's 8	3:37
3.	"Ultraviolet" (Yamato & DMD Remix)	Driving Hit's 7	3:37
4.	"Touch Down" (736 Remix)	Driving Hit's 6	2:34
5.	"Shhh!" (Textor Remix)	Driving Hit's 7	2:59
6.	"Hotel" (Plastik Funk Remix)	Driving Hit's 7	3:15
7.	"Lalalalala" (Elmer VoVo Remix)	Driving Hit's 6	3:35
8.	"Lady Go!" (DJ Komori Remix)	Driving Hit's 6	2:39
9.	"Girls" (Takarot "Tokyo Fantastic" Remix)	Driving Hit's 6	2:03
10.	"Lollipop" (Pink Chameleons Remix)	Driving Hit's 3	3:31
11.	"Pop Diva" (House Nation Sunset in Ibiza Remix)	Driving Hit's 3	3:06
12.	"With Your Smile" (Groovehacker$ Remix)	Driving Hit's 3	3:46
13.	"Lick Me" (Prog5 Big Bass Remix)	Driving Hit's 2	4:21
14.	"Butterfly" (Prog5 Mirrorball Remix)	Driving Hit's	4:09
15.	"Poppin' Love Cocktail (TeddyLoid Remix)" (feat. Teeda)	Driving Hit's 4	5:21
Total length:			52:17

CD3: Chill Side (Non-Stop Mixed by Remo-Con)
No.	Title	Original album	Length
1.	"Ai no Uta" (Jaxx da Fishworks Remix)	Driving Hit's 7	3:54
2.	"You" (KOZM® Remix)	Driving Hit's 4	2:52
3.	"Dance in the Rain" (Textor Remix)	Driving Hit's 7	2:48
4.	"Kiseki" (GTS SH Club Remix)	Driving Hit's 4	5:30
5.	"Stay with Me" (Tomoharu Moriya Remix)	Driving Hit's 2	3:45
6.	"Promise" (Elmer VoVo Remix)	Driving Hit's 6	4:20
7.	"Yume no Uta" (Sunset in Ibiza Remix)	Driving Hit's 2	4:54
8.	"Moon Crying" (GTS SH Club Mix)	Driving Hit's 3	5:50
9.	"Unmei" (Shohei Matsumoto Remix)	Driving Hit's 3	4:45
10.	"Ai o Tomenaide" (World Sketch Remix)	Driving Hit's 4	4:55
11.	"Anata Dake ga" (World Sketch Remix)	Driving Hit's 3	6:28
12.	"Hands" (The Standard Club Piano Dance Remix)	Driving Hit's 2	4:09
13.	"Aishō" (Shohei Matsumoto & Junichi Matsuda Remix)	Driving Hit's 4	5:06
14.	"Never Enough" (Yuto Remix)	Driving Hit's 8	3:41
15.	"Suki de, Suki de, Suki de." (Aili's Warmy Remix)	Driving Hit's 4	4:35
Total length:			67:32

== Charts ==
Chart (2019)	Peak position
Japanese Albums (Billboard Japan)	21
Japanese Albums (Oricon)	24
