= 20th Anniversary Tour 2020 My Name Is... =

Video by Koda Kumi
- Released: March 10, 2021
- Recorded: 2020
- Genre: R&B, J-pop, dance-pop, Rock, hip hop
- Label: Rhythm Zone; 2DVD (RZBD-77314～5); Blu-ray (RZXD-77316～7); 3DVD+2CD (RZZ1-77318～20/B～C); 3Blu-ray/2CD (RZZ1-77322～4/B～C)
- Producer: Koda Kumi

Koda Kumi chronology
Live Tour 2019 Re(live): Japonesque (2020)	20th Anniversary Tour 2020; My Name Is... (2021)

Koda Kumi 20th Anniversary Tour 2020 My Name Is... (stylized as KODA KUMI 20th ANNIVERSARY TOUR 2020 MY NAME IS...) is a live concert DVD by Japanese singer-songwriter Koda Kumi, and coincides with her compilation album My Name Is.... The DVD was released on March 10, 2021. It peaked at No. 3 on the Oricon DVD charts and remained on the charts for nine weeks.

The concert was released for purchase on Blu-ray and DVD, a limited 3DVD+2CD edition, and a limited 3Blu-ray+2CD edition.

== Information ==
Koda Kumi 20th Anniversary Tour 2020 My Name Is... is Japanese artist Koda Kumi's twentieth concert DVD/Blu-ray, released on March 10, 2020. The tour coincided with her compilation album My Name Is..., which had been released as a fan club exclusive on September 11, 2020. The tour was only held in four locations, with a total of ten shows due to the COVID-19 pandemic. The tour began in Osaka at Osaka-jo Hall on September 12, and ended in Shibuya at Yoyogi National Gymnasium on December 6.

The concert charted at No. 5 on the weekly Oricon DVD charts and No. 8 on the Oricon Blu-ray Charts, charting for nine weeks and four weeks, respectively.

The live was released to the public as a standard 2DVD set and a higher quality 2Blu-ray set. A limited 3DVD+2CD and 3Blu-ray+2CD were released to Koda Kumi's official fan club Koda Gumi.

The performance utilized on the DVD and Blu-ray was of her December 6 performance at Yoyogi National Stadium. The date coincided with her debut, which began with her song "Take Back" on December 6, 2000.

== COVID-19 precautions ==
Due to the COVID-19 pandemic, there were limited shows of the tour. As a precaution to those who attended, masks were required and seating was spaced to encourage social distancing. Venues were only held at half capacity and temperature readings were required before entry.

== Track listing ==
DVD1: 20th Anniversary Tour 2020 My Name Is...
No.	Title	Length
1.	"Take Back"
2.	"XXKK"
3.	"Pop Diva"
4.	"Universe"
5.	"Ultraviolet"
6.	"Taboo"
7.	"Sweetest Taboo"
8.	"Loaded feat. Sean Paul <Interlude Movie>"
9.	"Puff"
10.	"Crazy 4 U ~ BUT ~ Lollipop ~ Got Me Going' ~ Bassline ~ Who"
11.	"Dance in the Rain"
12.	"Moon Crying"
13.	"Hands"
14.	"Sometimes Dreams Come True"
15.	"Walk of My Life <Dancers In Action>"
16.	"Party ~ Is This Trap? ~ Won't Be Long ~ Real Emotion ~ Eh Yo ~ Dreaming Now! ~ LIT"
17.	"Lucky Star"
18.	"Girls ~ Butterfly ~ I'm Lovin' ~ Wind"
19.	"Walk"

DVD2
No.	Title	Length
1.	"Behind the Scenes" (Digest Edition)

DVD3: Bonus Footage
No.	Title	Length
1.	"Chances All" (Marine Messe Fukuoka) (2020.10.04)
2.	"Kiseki" (Marine Messe Fukuoka) (2020.10.04)
3.	"Suki de, Suki de, Suki de." (Nippon Gaishi Hall) (2020.10.10)
4.	"Through the Sky" (Nippon Gaishi Hall) (2020.10.10)
5.	"1000 no Kotoba" (Yoyogi National Stadium) (2020.12.05)
6.	"Bridget Song" (Yoyogi National Stadium) (2020.12.05)
7.	"Lucky Star" (Music Video)	3:36
8.	"Puff" (Dance Version)	3:26
9.	"Killer Monster" (Dance Version)	3:42
10.	"Lucky Star" (Tour Edition)	3:36
11.	"Dreaming Now!" (Tour Edition)	4:18

CD1: 20th Anniversary Tour 2020 My Name Is... (Vol. 1)
No.	Title	Length
1.	"Take Back"
2.	"XXKK"
3.	"Pop Diva"
4.	"Universe"
5.	"Ultraviolet"
6.	"Taboo"
7.	"Sweetest Taboo"
8.	"Loaded feat. Sean Paul"
9.	"Puff"
10.	"Crazy 4 U ~ BUT ~ Lollipop ~ Got Me Going' ~ Bassline ~ Who"
11.	"Dance in the Rain"

CD2: 20th Anniversary Tour 2020 My Name Is... (Vol. 2)
No.	Title	Length
1.	"Moon Crying"
2.	"Hands"
3.	"Sometimes Dreams Come True"
4.	"Walk of My Life"
5.	"Party ~ Is This Trap? ~ Won't Be Long ~ Real Emotion ~ Eh Yo ~ Dreaming Now! ~ LIT"
6.	"Lucky Star"
7.	"Girls ~ Butterfly ~ I'm Lovin' ~ Wind"
8.	"Walk"

== Tour dates and locations ==
The tour had limited shows due to the COVID-19 pandemic in Japan, and were only held in four locations with two performances each day: Osaka-jō Hall, Marine Messe Fukuoka, Nagoya Civic Assembly Hall and Yoyogi National Gymnasium. The tour ran for three months between September and December 2020.

1. September 12, 2020: Osaka-jo Hall
2. October 4, 2020: Marine Messe Fukuoka
3. October 10, 2020: Nagoya Civic Assembly Hall
4. December 5, 2020: Yoyogi National Stadium
5. December 6, 2020: Yoyogi National Stadium

== Charts (Japan) ==
Release	Chart	Peak position	Total sales
March 10, 2021	Oricon DVD Chart	5	5,929 copies
March 10, 2021	Oricon Blu-ray Chart	8	2,511 copies
