= Re(mix) =

re(Mix)

Remix album by Koda Kumi
- Released: March 11, 2020
- Recorded: 2019 (vocals), 2020 (melodies)
- Genre: Drum and bass; dubstep; house
- Label: Rhythm Zone

Koda Kumi chronology
| Re(cord) (2019) | re(Mix) (2020) | Best: 2000–2020 (2021) |

re(Mix) (stylized as re(MIX)) is the twelfth remix album released by Japanese singer-songwriter Koda Kumi on March 11, 2020. It charted at No. 33 on the Oricon charts. It was her third remix album to not be under the Driving Hit's series. Unlike the majority of her remix albums, this album was not part of the Driving Hit's series.

Almost all of the songs from her studio album Re(cord) were placed on the album, with the exception of "Livin' La Vida Loca" and "Rich & Famous".

== Information ==
re(Mix) is the twelfth remix album released by Koda Kumi. It was released one year after her previous remix album, Koda Kumi Driving Hit's 9 -Special Edition-, on March 11, 2020. It became her second lowest charting remix album, charting at No. 33 on the Oricon Albums Charts, with first week sales of 1,231. Unlike the majority of her remix albums, this album was not part of the Driving Hit's series. This made it the third outside of the series, the others being Koda Kumi Remix Album (2006) and Beach Mix (2012).

The album was released the same day as her concert videos Live Tour 2019 re(Live) -Black Cherry- and Live Tour 2019 re(Live) -Japonesque-.

All of the remixed songs were from her sixteenth studio album Re(cord). Two songs from the album were omitted: her English cover of Ricky Martin's hit "Livin' La Vida Loca" and her collaboration with Sean Paul, "Rich & Famous". However, two versions of "Goldfinger 2019" were used and the album began and ended with the song "k,".

Ten remix artists worked on the album, including shadow, KATFYR, KAZBONGO, Adolfo De La Torre Casmartiño, iamSHUM, Toki, Kiyoshi Sugo, MATZ, BUNNY and DJ Shimamura.

== Track listing ==
1. "k," (shadow Remix)
2. "Eh Yo" (KATFYR Remix)
3. "Strip" (KAZBONGO Remix)
4. "Goldfinger 2019" (Adolfo De La Torre Casmartiño Remix)
5. "Put Your Hands Up!!!" (iamSHUM Remix)
6. "Merry Go Round" (Toki Remix)
7. "Get Naked" (Kiyoshi Sugo Remix)
8. "Again" (MATZ Remix)
9. "Summer Time" (iamSHUM Remix)
10. "Shutout" (BUNNY Remix)
11. "Do Me" (KATFYR Remix)
12. "OMG" (Kiyoshi Sugo Remix)
13. "Goldfinger 2019" (DJ Shimamura Remix)
14. "k," (KAZBONGO Remix)

== Charts (Japan) ==
| Release | Chart | Peak position | Chart run | Total sales |
|---|---|---|---|---|
| March 11, 2020 | Oricon Weekly Albums Chart | 33 | 1 | 1,231 copies sold |
