= Love Me Back =

Love Me Back:

- Love Me Back (album), by Jazmine Sullivan
- "Love Me Back" (Can Bonomo song)
- "Love Me Back" (Koda Kumi song)
- Love Me Back - Song by Trinidad Cardona
- Love Me Back - Song by fromis_9 for the Webtoon "Operation: True Love"
