= Love Me Back (Koda Kumi song) =

Single by Koda Kumi

from the album Japonesque
- B-side: "Say Her Name"
- Released: November 29, 2011
- Recorded: 2011
- Genre: Dance-pop, electropop, R&B
- Length: 10:30
- Label: Rhythm Zone
- Songwriters: Koda Kumi, Matthew Tishler, Liz Rodrigues

Koda Kumi singles chronology
"Ai o Tomenaide" (2011)	"Love Me Back" (2011)	"Love Romance" (2012)

Music video
- "Love Me Back" on YouTube

"Love Me Back" is the fifty-second single by Japanese singer Koda Kumi, released on November 29, 2011. It charted at No. 6 and stayed on the Oricon charts for seven weeks. Both "Love Me Back" and the b-side, "Say Her Name," were written by Koda Kumi. It was released in CD, CD+DVD and CD+Goods.

The limited editions of all editions came with a special sticker designed by Yusuke Nakamura.

== Background information ==
Love Me Back is singer-songwriter Koda Kumi's fifty-second single under the Avex sub-label Rhythm Zone. The single charted at No. 6 on the Oricon Singles Charts and remained on the charts for seven consecutive weeks. The single was released in three editions: CD, CD+DVD and CD+Goods. The latter edition came with a large carrying pouch in two varying colors, red and purple.

"Love Me Back" was created as the theme for the Japanese television drama Nazotoki wa Dinner no Ato de on Fuji-TV. The drama is based on the novel of the same name, written by Tokuya Higashikawa. The series features Keiko Kitagawa as Hosho Reiko and Sho Sakurai as Kageyama.

The single's B-side, "Say Her Name," was an R&B track with the lyrics written by Kumi and the music written by Norwegian songwriters Ina Wroldsen, Andre Lindal, and Geir Hvidsten. There was also a remix for "Love Me Back". The remix was done by Andy Price of Prix Fixe Productions and coordinated by Yuko Yasumoto, who is most popular for working with Japanese artist Namie Amuro and South Korean group TVXQ.

On the CD+DVD editions, Kumi's performance for A-nation 10th Anniversary for Life Charge&Go! was included. During the performance, she performed "Be My Baby," "Bling Bling Bling" and "Poppin' love cocktail," the latter of which featured, not only TEEDA, but all of the members of Back-On. The live of "Poppin' love cocktail" was also when Kumi and her soon-to-be husband Kenji03 performed on stage together and came out publicly as a couple.

== Promotional advertisements ==
"Love Me Back" was used as the opening theme song to the Japanese drama Nazotoki wa Dinner no Ato de (謎解きはディナーのあとで / The After-Dinner Mysteries), which aired on Fuji Television. The drama is an adaptation of the novel, which was written by Tokuya Higashikawa in 2010.

The television series features actress/model Keiko Kitagawa as the young detective Hosho Reiko and Sho Sakurai as the butler Kageyama. Keiko Kitagawa is well known for her portrayal of Sailor Mars in the live action of Pretty Guardian Sailor Moon and as Yumi Honma in the 2006 comedy The Mamiya Brothers. Sho Sakurai is the rapper in the group Arashi and is also known for his role as Bambi in Kisarazu Cat's Eye.

== Certifications ==
"Love Me Back" was certified gold for 100,000 downloads in January 2014.

== Music video ==
The video for "Love Me Back" was released the first week of November on MTV; however, the video did not leak onto the internet until November 27.

The music video carried a theme of three women attempting to free their mob boss from jail. They take on the personas of police officers to break into the jail, then cover as nurses to remain inside. While the single's video only carried snippets of the story, the "album version," which was placed on the corresponding album Japonesque, contained the full story, with a complete introduction.

The overall theme and feel of the video was very reminiscent of her 2007 video "Cherry Girl," which had carried a Charlie's Angels theme.

== Track listing ==
All lyrics are written by Koda Kumi.

CD
No.	Title	Music	Length
1.	"Love Me Back"	Matthew Tishler; Liz Rodrigues	3:02
2.	"Say Her Name"	Andre Lindal; Ina Wroldsen; Geir Hvidsten	3:19
3.	"Love Me Back" (Andy Price Remix)	Matthew Tishler; Liz Rodrigues	3:59

DVD
No.	Title	Length
1.	"Love Me Back" (Music video)
2.	"Love Me Back" (Making video)
3.	"A-nation 10th Anniversary for Life Charge&Go! : 01. BE MY BABY; 02. Bling Bling Bling; 03. Poppin' love cocktail feat. TEEDA"

== Charts ==
=== Oricon sales chart ===
Release	Chart	Peak position	First day/week sales	Sales total
November 29, 2011	Oricon Daily Chart	5		
November 29, 2011	Oricon Weekly Chart	6	32,885	43,290
November 29, 2011	Oricon Monthly Chart	20	42,703	
November 29, 2011	Oricon Yearly Chart	199		

== Alternate versions ==
1. "Love Me Back: found on the single (2011) and corresponding album Japonesque (2012)
2. "Love Me Back" [Andy Price Remix]: found on the single (2011)
3. "Love Me Back" [Sunset in Ibiza Dubstep Remix]: found on Koda Kumi Driving Hit's 4 (2012)
4. "Love Me Back" [The Young Punx! Remix]: found on Koda Kumi Driving Hit's 4 (2012)
