= Koda Kumi Driving Hit's 4 =

Remix album by Koda Kumi
- Released: March 14, 2012
- Recorded: 2002–2012
- Genre: Drum and bass; dubstep; house
- Length: 73:24
- Label: Rhythm Zone

Koda Kumi chronology
Japonesque (2012)	Koda Kumi Driving Hit's 4 (2012)	Beach Mix (2012)

Koda Kumi Driving Hit's 4 is the fifth remix album by Japanese singer Koda Kumi. The album is remixed entirely by electronic duo House Nation. The CD contains remixes of songs from previous albums, up to and including Japonesque. It was released on March 14, 2012, and, at the time, was her lowest-ranking remix album, coming in at number 13 on the Oricon charts and only staying on the charts for six weeks. It was released less than four months prior to her most successful remix album, Beach Mix.

Unlike her previous remix albums, Driving Hit's 4's remixes were made in drum and bass and dubstep. It is also her first Driving Hit's album to not include the song "Driving" from her 2009 album Trick.

== Track listing ==
Official track list.

1. "Poppin' love cocktail" feat. Teeda [TeddyLoid Remix]
2. "Hot Stuff feat. KM-MARKIT" [Electlixxx vs. Heavens Wire D'n'B Remix]
3. "Love Me Back" [Sunset In Ibiza Dubstep Remix]
4. "Teaser feat. Clench & Blistah" [Caramel Pod Dubstep Remix]
5. "Melting" [DJ OMKT & MJ Remix]
6. "Megumi no Hito" [The Lowbrows Remix]
7. "Juicy" [Pink Chameleons Remix]
8. "Slow" feat. Omarion [Prog5 vs. Future House United Remix]
9. "Kiseki" [GTS SH Club Mix]
10. "Ai o Tomenaide" ［World Sketch Remix]
11. "Aishou" [Shohei Matsumoto & Junichi Matsuda Remix]
12. "Walk" [soichi Ono Remix]
13. "Won't Be Long" [United Colors Remix]
14. "But" [KOZMR Remix]
15. "Butterfly" [TeddyLoid Remix]
16. "You" [KOZMR Remix]
17. "Suki de, Suki de, Suki de." [AILI's Warmy Remix]
18. "Love Me Back" [The Young Punx! Remix] (Bonus track)

== Oricon Charts (Japan) ==
Release	Chart	Peak position	Total sales
March 14, 2012	Oricon Daily Chart	11	
March 14, 2012	Oricon Weekly Chart	13	9,595
March 14, 2012	Oricon Monthly Chart	49	13,745
