= No Man's Land (Koda Kumi song) =

Promotional single by Koda Kumi

from the album Japonesque
- Released: January 18, 2012
- Recorded: 2011; Avex Studios; (Tokyo, Japan)
- Genre: Rock; heavy metal
- Length: 4:26
- Label: Avex Trax; Rhythm Zone
- Songwriters: Koda Kumi; Mr. Blistah; Pete Kirtley; Jorge Mhondera; Samiya Berrabah
- Producer: Max Matsuura

Music video
- "No Man's Land" on YouTube

"No Man's Land" is a song recorded by Japanese recording artist Koda Kumi, taken from her tenth studio album, Japonesque (2012). It was written by Koda, Mr. Blistah, Pete Kirtley, Jorge Mhondera, Samiya Berrabah, with production being done by long-time collaborator Max Matsuura. The song premiered on January 18, 2012, as the album's fifth promotional digital single, which was served through online retailers Dwanga, Mora, Mu-Mo, music.jp and Recochoku. It was re-released as a promotional radio airplay single on January 25, the same release date as Japonesque. The single artwork uses the CD and double DVD cover of Japonesque, which was used exclusively through Recochoku stores.

Musically, "No Man's Land" has been described as a rock song that borrows numerous musical elements such as heavy metal. It lyrically portrays an angry and violent woman trying to escape her lover's life. Self-described as "barren", the song includes several instruments including electric guitars, acoustic guitars, and drums. The song received mixed to positive reviews from most music critics. While critics singled it out as an album highlight and one of the better tracks from Japonesque, it was criticized for Koda's rap and overuse of instrumentation.

Due to "No Man's Land" being released digitally, it was ineligible to chart on the Japanese Oricon Singles Chart due to their policy of restricting digital sales and releases. To promote the single, it has featured on one concert tour conducted by Koda, this being her 2013 Japonesque Tour. An accompanying music video for "No Man's Land" (and every other track from the parent album) was directed by long-time collaborator Ryuji Seki; it featured Koda wandering through a wasteland, with distant views of decayed cityscapes and merry go rounds.

== Background and release ==
While working on her then-upcoming album Japonesque (2012), Koda and her main record labels Avex Trax and Rhythm Zone enlisted Japanese rapper Mr. Blistah to work with her again; Mr. Blistah worked and performed with Koda in some of her albums, including the single "Candy, and Japonesque promotional single "So Nice", among others. "No Man's Land" was written by Koda, Mr. Blistah, Pete Kirtley, Jorge Mhondera, Samiya Berrabah, and produced by long-time collaborator Max Matsuura. Mr. Blistah, Kirtley, Mhondera, and Berrabah served as the song's composers, with Japanese arrangers Kenichi Asami, Toshiyuki Takao, Satoshi Yamada, and Daisuke Sakurai hired to arrange the instrumentation. Both Kirtley and Mhondera were credited as the song's co-arrangers. The song's instrumentation includes guitars, drums, bass guitars, keyboards, and subtle synthesizers. The song was recorded in early-2011 by Takeshi Takizawa, Makoto Yamadoi, and Masahiro Kawata at Prime Sound Studios and Avex Studios, in Tokyo, Japan.

In December 2011, Rhythm Zone confirmed that "No Man's Land" would be included on Japonesque, and it appeared as the thirteenth track on all formats from Japonesque. "No Man's Land", alongside Japonesque tracks: "So Nice", "Slow" featuring American recording artist Omarion, "Brave", and "Escalate", served as the album's lead promotional digital singles on January 18, 2012, which was served through online retailers including Mora, Mu-Mo, music.jp and Recochoku. That same year, "No Man's Land", "So Nice", "Slow", "Brave", and "Escalate" were then re-released on January 25 through Japanese airplay stations. This was the same release date as the album Japonesque A special application code was uploaded onto Koda's official website, which allowed users to access the song from Recochoku and download a full ringtone for free. At the end of January 2012, British production team StarRock promoted the single on Star Rock television; the song was circulated throughout UK radio airplay shows. The single artwork uses the CD and double DVD cover of Japonesque, which was used exclusively through Recochoku stores.

== Composition ==
"No Man's Land"
A 30-seconds sample of "No Man's Land". A "hard" mid-tempo rock-oriented song, it also contains elements of heavy metal in its compositions.

"No Man's Land" is a "hard" mid-tempo rock song. Koda stated on her website that the song was a "violently", "painful", and "destructive" mix of rock and heavy metal music. Koda recognized the musical composition as a "turning point" for her future musical elements and influences. The original arrangement of "No Man's Land" was different from the current version; according to Koda, the original arrangement omitted the rapping verses and didn't include heavy rock instrumentation or synthesizers. Zero from JpopJRock.com commented that "No Man's Land" was the only song on the album that didn't suffer from a "sparse" arrangement.

Lyrically, "No Man's Land" portrays an angry and violent woman trying to escape her lovers life. In an exclusive interview with Recochoku about the song, Koda stated that "No Man's Land" is a "nuance" of a "girl screaming that she wants to go to a world with no other men." Koda identified that the themes cheating and betrayal are present throughout the song's lyrics. However, Koda stated that "No Man's Land" had a similarity to her single "Futari de...", where she believed had also grown strength after moving on. Koda performs the song in both the English and Japanese languages, one of nine tracks from Japonesque that is performed bilingually. According to the lyric sheet provided by Avex Trax, English is used in the song's hook; "No man's, no man's, no man's land". The onomatopoeia lyric "Ding Dong Ding Dong" is spoken during the first verse, whilst the rest is rapped in Japanese. The chorus opens with the English lyrics; "I've been running in circles, round and around", carries on with Japanese, and ends with "Welcome to no man's land". The second verse includes the phrases "Zero zero" and "so look at deep", whilst performed in Japanese. The bridge section has Koda singing in English; "No matter where I go, this is still my home" and "my home", whilst performing in Japanese. The song's final English phrase is the interlude break; "Everybody put hands right this", and finishes with the chorus and hook.

== Critical reception ==
After its release, "No Man's Land" received mixed to positive reviews from most music critics. Zero, Jaylee, and Loki from JpopJRock.com highlighted "No Man's Land" as the best track on the album; they agreed that the single had a better arrangement than most tracks on Japonesque, and enjoyed the song's composition. A member from StarRock highlighted "No Man's Land" as the best track on the album, praising its commercial appeal. A staff member from CD Journal enjoyed the song's composition, labelling the verses and second half of the song "impressive".

== Music video ==
=== Background and synopsis ===

The video, based in a wasteland and abandoned city, features the dark Koda (above) and Koda in the aftermath (below). Koda's clothing in the video was subjected to controversy, which led it to being banned.

The accompanying music video for "No Man's Land" was directed by long-time collaborator Ryuji Seki. The music video was shot with Koda in front of a green screen to immolate the chroma key functions. Koda, who was present at post-production for the music video, suggested the use of black and white colouring, which Seki then added. This is Koda's first music video to be in full black and white. The video opens with a distance shot of a wasteland, with decaying trees, floating black leaves, and hills. Koda is seen dragging herself through the valley, and an inter cut scene features a body shot of Koda in front of an abandoned city and abandoned merry-go-round; the merry-go-round references the lyric in the song. As the first hook stars in the song, it features two scenes; Koda singing the track in a distance, and close-ups of Koda wearing a shackle. The verse has Koda wandering through a valley and singing the song.

The first chorus has Koda walking through the land, and scenes of her singing. She grabs a compass, but it does not function properly. She grabs a drinking bottle, but only filled with little droplets; she tries to drink it, but falls all on her face instead. As she sings the song; by the end of the second chorus, black projectile smoke is scene falling from the sky in the distance and hits parts of the abandoned city. As more smoke falls and black leaves con-stellate, Koda collapses and sings the bridge on the ground. When the bridge section ends, rocks start levitating and the smoke rises, forming a black Dust devil in the distance. As more dust devil's form, they become large and closely devour Koda.

By the last chorus, a close-up of Koda's eyes closes and zooms out, showing Koda in lighter clothes and long hair. A long field of dark green grass with the sun and blue sky beaming above it, still showing the abandoned city and merry-go-round in the distance. The field is then shown to be the distance of a cliff, with Koda standing on the edge and observing a forest at the bottom; these scenes are shot in colour instead of black and white. The final vocal interlude break of the song has inter cut scenes of Koda on the cliff, and Koda walking through the valley from earlier scenes. The final scene has a repeating scene of the first scene; Koda walking through the valley in the distance of a wasteland. After completing the video and watching it, Koda commented that the overall appearance had given her a "personal connection" to the video and song. She stated that the visual effects were "very cool", and declared it as one of her "best" videos.

=== Release ===
The music video premiered on Japanese music television channels on January 18, 2012. Alongside with its radio airplay release, StarRock Productions had premiered the music video on UK music television channels on January 25. The music video for "No Man's Land" appeared on the CD and DVD format, and the CD and double DVD formats for Japonesque. Koda uploaded the video on her website, in order to promote the music videos from the album. On January 26, Koda hosted a special television show for Nico Nico Live and premiered the music video to "No Man's Land", alongside the music videos from Japonesque. Tetsuo Hiraga from Hot Express complimented the music video's erotic nature, Koda's sexy image, and the video's graphics.

== Live performances and other inclusions ==
"No Man's Land" has appeared on one of Koda's concert tours, this being her 2013 Japonesque tour. The performance was included on part two of the concert tour, where Koda is wearing a soldier's uniform and singing the song in front of her backing band. Koda plays the drums to the ending interlude of the track. The performance was recorded live and included on the subsequent live DVD release, Koda Kumi Live Tour 2013: Japonesque (2013). Released as a triple-DVD and double-Blu-ray set, "No Man's Land" appeared on the second disc and first disc respectively. The 4 Skips D'n'B remix for "No Man's Land" was included on her Koda Kumi Driving Hit's 5 remix compilation (2013).

== Track listing ==
- Digital download
1. "No Man's Land" – 4:26
- Digital music video download
1. "No Man's Land" (music video) – 4:34
- 2013 Japonesque Tour live download
1. "No Man's Land" (2013 Japonesque Tour live audio) – 4:11
- 4 Skips D'n'B remix digital download
1. "No Man's Land" – 4:26

== Credits and personnel ==
Credits adapted from the liner notes of Japonesque.

- Koda Kumi – vocals, background vocals, songwriting
- Mr. Blistah – songwriting, composing
- Pete Kirtley – songwriting, composing, arrangement
- Jorge Mhondera – songwriting, composing, arrangement
- Samiya Berrabah – songwriting, composing
- Kenichi Asami – arrangement, programming, acoustic guitar
- Toshiyuki Takao – arrangement, drums
- Satoshi Yamada – arrangement, bass guitar
- Daisuke Sakurai – arrangement, keyboards, synthesizers
- Takeshi Takizawa – engineer, recording
- Makoto Yamadoi – engineer, recording
- Masahiro Kawata – engineer, recording
- Ryuji Seki – music video director
- Rhythm Zone - management, label
- Avex Taiwan – distribution label
- Avex Trax - parent label, management
- Recorded at Prime Sound Studios and Avex Studios, in Tokyo, Japan.

== Release history ==
Region	Date	Format	Label
Japan (Note: These references for January 18 are reflected on the specific digital retail stores: Dwanga, Mora, Mu-Mo, music.jp and Recochoku. All digital releases on January 25 were released globally on iTunes Store, through the Japonesque album.)	January 18, 2012	Digital download	Avex Trax; Rhythm Zone
Japan	January 25, 2012	Digital download	Avex Music Creative Inc.
Australia	January 25, 2012	Digital download	Avex Music Creative Inc.
New Zealand	January 25, 2012	Digital download	Avex Music Creative Inc.
United Kingdom	January 25, 2012	Digital download	Avex Music Creative Inc.
Germany	January 25, 2012	Digital download	Avex Music Creative Inc.
Ireland	January 25, 2012	Digital download	Avex Music Creative Inc.
France	January 25, 2012	Digital download	Avex Music Creative Inc.
Spain	January 25, 2012	Digital download	Avex Music Creative Inc.
Taiwan	January 25, 2012	Digital download	Avex Music Creative Inc.

== See also ==
- Koda Kumi discography
