= Angel + Monster =

EP by Koda Kumi
- Released: December 2, 2020
- Recorded: 2020
- Genre: Japanese pop/R&B
- Label: Rhythm Zone; RZCD-77198 (Angel, CD); RZCD-77199 (Monster, CD); RZCD-77196 (2CD+DVD); RZC1-77200～1/B～C (FC 2CD+2DVD); RZC1-77202-3/B (FC 2CD+Blu-ray)

Koda Kumi chronology
Again (2019)	Angel + Monster (2020)	Wings (2023)

Angel + Monster (stylized as angeL + monsteR [MY NAME IS...]) is an extended play by Japanese artist Koda Kumi, released on December 2, 2020.

It debuted at No. 5 on the Oricon Albums Charts.

It was released in five editions - three made public and two exclusive to her official fan club. Angel and Monster were released separately, as well as combined in the 2CD+DVD version.

== Information ==
Angel + Monster is the sixth EP by Japanese artist Koda Kumi, released on December 2, 2020. It is her sixth official EP, her last being Gossip Candy, which was released in 2010 - the extended plays from her Fever series excluded. The combined EP debuted at No. 5 on the Oricon charts. Angel charted at No. 123 on the Oricon charts, while Monster peaked at No. 129.

The EP was released in five editions. Two CD only editions, a 2CD+DVD edition, a 2CD+2DVD edition and a 2CD+Blu-ray edition. Angel and Monster were both released separately. The 2CD+DVD version carried both the Angel and Monster EPs, and a DVD housing four music videos. Of the four music videos, two had previously been released on the video streaming website YouTube: "XXKK" and "Puff". Two new music videos accompanied them titled "Killer Monster" (stylized as Killer MonsteR) and "Run" (stylized as RUN). The fan club limited 2CD+2DVD and 2CD+Blu-ray editions housed a special making video for the music videos and the photoshoot for the EP's various covers. It also contained an original photobook.

All of the songs on the albums were recorded in Kumi's home studio during the "stay at home" order due to the COVID-19 pandemic in Japan.

The song "For..." (stylized as for...) was a collaboration between Koda Kumi and her fans while she was hosting an Instagram live event. In the credits, she has the lyrics listed as written by "All Fans". The track "Run" was a response to her 2002 song "Walk", expressing how she has grown as an artist and how her fans have supported her along the way.

== Music videos ==
Both "Puff" and "XXKK" had been released on YouTube prior to the EPs release.

"Puff" was released digitally on June 26, 2020. That same day, an accompanying music video was uploaded to Avex's official YouTube. The video was inspired by Japan's "stay-at-home order" due to the COVID-19 pandemic in Japan. In the video, Koda Kumi and several of her backup dancers perform a dance in their own respective homes, consisting of various yoga poses and lite calisthenics. An alternate version of the video was uploaded with Kumi in front of a blue screen, encouraging fans to input their own backgrounds and tag the videos as "MADE93".

"XXKK" was created to celebrate Kumi's 20th anniversary in the music industry, with lyrics and visuals representing her title as "Queen of Live". In the video, Kumi dons a silver getup with a crown reading "XXKK", along with contrasting visuals representing her more elegant side during the bridge. The video was uploaded to Avex's official YouTube on September 4, 2020.

The music video for "Killer Monster" was primarily a dance number with Kumi and her dancers donning urban grunge fashion. Intermittent scenes of Kumi in other styles in back alleyways were edited in, while the main focus was the group dancing in front of a large graffiti mural. The other a-side, "Run", was much slower and calmer. It focused on Kumi coming home to an empty home and singing about her struggles. It cuts to her in open water, symbolizing drowning, before ending with her swimming to surface.

== Track listing ==
CD: Angel
No.	Title	Lyrics	Music	Composer(s)	Length
1.	"Alarm"	Koda Kumi • Mike Macdermid	Mike Macdermid • David Brant • Fidel Rosales • Charlotte Churchman	David Brant • Fidel Rosales	3:13
2.	"I'm Lovin'"	Koda Kumi	Joe Lawrence • Linda Quero	Joe Lawrence	3:06
3.	"for..."	Koda Kumi • ALL FANS	Koda Kumi • Hi-yunk	UTA	4:41
4.	"Run"	Koda Kumi	Matthew Tishler • Philip Bentley • Choo DaeKwan	Matthew Tishler	3:41
5.	"Puff"	Koda kumi	Alyssa Ayaka Ichinose • Carlyle Fernandes • Gionata Caracciolo • Sara Spagnoli • Sofia Ahlang	Alyssa Ayaka Ichinose • Carlyle Fernandes	3:24
6.	"Lucky Star"	Koda Kumi	Christoffer Lauridsen • Andreas Öberg • Courtney Jenaé	Christoffer Lauridsen	3:34
Total length:					21:39

CD: Monster
No.	Title	Lyrics	Music	Composer(s)	Length
1.	"Killer Monster"	Koda Kumi • Poe Leos	Kxhris • Nellz	Kxhris • Nellz	3:40
2.	"Work It!"	Koda Kumi	Erik Lidbom • Ylva Dimberg • Nerd Money	Erik Lidbom • Nerd Money	3:02
3.	"FliCky"	Koda Kumi	Nicklas Eklund • Charlotte Wilson • Awry Will	Nicklas Eklund	3:10
4.	"No One"	Koda Kumi	Hi-yunk	Hi-yunk	4:15
5.	"Sing the truth"	Koda Kumi	Elizabeth Russo • Stefan Litrownik • John Wyatt Johnson • Karra Madden	Stfan Litrownik • John Wyatt Johnson	2:23
6.	"XXKK"	Koda Kumi	Matt Wong • G'Harah "PK" Degeddingseze • Jamie Jones • Sydnie Brazile	G'Harah "PK" Degeddingseze • The Heavyweights	3:31
Total length:					20:01

DVD: Angel + Monster
No.	Title	Director(s)	Length
1.	"Puff" (Music Video)	Seiya Ito	3:38
2.	"XXKK" (Music Video)	Ryuji⋆Seki	3:56
3.	"Killer Monster" (Music Video)	Ryuji⋆Seki	3:39
4.	"Run" (Music Video)	Ryuji⋆Seki	3:52
Total length:			15:05

DVD2: Fan Club Limited
No.	Title	Length
1.	"Suki de, Suki de, Suki de." (Urusei Yatsura Collaboration Version)	2:11
2.	"Guess Who Is Back" (Lyric Video)	3:38
3.	"Behind the Scenes" (angeL × monsteR [MY NAME IS…])

== Charts (Japan) ==
Billboard Japan chart performance for Angel [My Name Is...]
Release	Chart	Peak position	Total sales
December 2, 2020	Billboard Weekly Chart	9	7,510

Billboard Japan chart performance for Monster [My Name Is...]
Release	Chart	Peak position	Total sales
December 2, 2020	Billboard Weekly Chart	10	7,493

Oricon chart performance for Angel+Monster [My Name Is...]
Release	Chart	Peak position	Total sales
December 2, 2020	Oricon Daily Chart	5	
December 2, 2020	Oricon Weekly Chart	12	6,975
December 2, 2020	Oricon Monthly Chart	43	7,434
