= Tales of the World: Radiant Mythology 2 =

2009 video game

- Developer: Alfa System
- Publisher: Namco Bandai Games
- Series: Tales
- Platform: PlayStation Portable
- Release: JP: January 29, 2009
- Genre: Action RPG
- Mode: Single-player

Tales of the World: Radiant Mythology 2 (テイルズオブザワールド レディアントマイソロジー2, Teiruzu Obu Za Wārudo Redianto Maisorojī 2) is the fifth entry in the Tales of the World series, and the second entry in the Radiant Mythology series. Tales of the World: Radiant Mythology 2's characteristic genre name is RPG For Your Sake (君のためのRPG, Kimi no tame no RPG). Like other games in the series, it features a group of characters from various Tales games. Fifty characters from the series make an appearance. The theme song, flyaway, is performed by Back-On. It was released exclusively in Japan on January 29, 2009.

== Characters ==
=== Original Characters ===
- Kanonno Earhart
- Panille
- Shoh Corron
- Niata
- Janis
- Goede
- Genesis Llobrera

=== Series Characters ===
Characters marked in BOLD are new to Tales of the World: Radiant Mythology 2

Tales of Phantasia

- **Cress Albane**
- **Mint Adenade**
- Chester Burklight
- Arche Klein
- **Suzu Fujibayashi**

Tales of Destiny

- Stahn Aileron
- Rutee Katrea
- Leon Magnus
- Philia Felice
- Woodrow Kelvin
- **Mighty Kongman**
- **Lilith Aileron**

Tales of Eternia

- Reid Hershel
- **Farah Oersted**
- **Keele Zeibel**
- **Chat**
- **Celsius**

Tales of Destiny 2

- **Kyle Dunamis**
- **Reala**
- Nanaly Fletch
- Harold Berselius

Tales of Symphonia

- Lloyd Irving
- **Colette Brunel**
- Kratos Aurion
- Genis Sage
- Raine Sage
- **Presea Combatir**
- **Zelos Wilder**

Tales of Rebirth

- **Veigue Lungberg**
- **Mao Orselg**
- Eugene Gallardo
- Annie Barrs

Tales of Legendia

- Senel Coolidge
- **Chloe Valens**

Tales of the Abyss

- Luke fon Fabre
- Tear Grants
- **Guy Cecil**
- **Jade Curtiss**
- **Anise Tatlin**
- **Asch**

Tales of the Tempest

- **Caius Qualls**
- **Rubia Natwick**

Tales of Innocence

- **Ruca Milda**
- **Illia Animi**
- **Spada Belforma**

Tales of Vesperia

- **Yuri Lowell**
- **Estellise Sidos Heurassein**

=== Character Classes ===
Those marked in BOLD are new to Tales of the World: Radiant Mythology 2.

- Warrior - Has high physical strength and excels in close-range combat.
- Thief - Uses quick dagger attacks, giving enemies little chance to counter.
- Mage - Uses offensive magic spells for dealing damage.
- Priest - Specializes in healing and support magic.
- Swordsman - Has a variety of strong and quick sword attacks.
- Fighter - Uses fast and power attacks based on martial arts.
- Hunter - Excels in attacking enemies from a distance with a bow.
- Ninja - Utilizes quickness and trickery to defeat enemies.
- Bishop - Uses stronger offensive spells with some healing/support magic.
- Magic Knight - Adept at both physical attacks and magic spells.
- **Dual Swordsman** - Uses two swords to increase close-range damage and attack speed.
- **Great Swordsman** - Uses one, large sword. Slow, but extremely powerful.
- **Pirate** - Adept at both close and ranged combat with a dagger and pistol.
- **Monk** - A Stronger version of the Fighter that uses healing spells.
- **Paladin** - Also uses a large sword, but has healing spells.

== Reception ==
On release, Famitsu magazine scored the game a 32 out of 40.

Radiant Mythology 2 ranked first in sales between January 26 and February 22 of 2009 at 288,860 copies sold. By the end of 2009, Radiant Mythology 2 sold a total of 339,523 copies and was the 25th best-selling game in Japan of 2009.
