= Pop Diva =

- CD only artwork

Single by Koda Kumi

from the album Dejavu
- B-side: "Black Candy"
- Released: February 2, 2011
- Recorded: 2010
- Genre: Dance-pop; electropop
- Length: 3:32
- Label: Rhythm Zone
- Songwriter: Lil' Showy
- Producer: Lil' Showy

Koda Kumi singles chronology
"Suki de, Suki de, Suki de./Anata Dake ga" (2010)	"Pop Diva" (2011)	"4 Times" (2011)

Music video
- "Pop Diva" on YouTube

"Pop Diva" (stylized as "POP DIVA") is a song recorded by Japanese musician Koda Kumi, taken as the fourth and final single from her ninth studio album Dejavu (2011). It premiered on February 2, 2011 by Rhythm Zone and Avex Music Creative Inc. in two physical formats and for digital download. The song was written, composed, arranged and produced by musical artist Lil' Showy, making it one of few tracks from Dejavu to not be written by Koda.

Musically, "Pop Diva" is an uptempo dance-pop tune that heavily incorporates the electronic genre and hip-hop, and is one of few tracks from the parent album to bare this sound. The lyrical content describes Koda's personality as somewhat of a diva, and also delves into the themes of fame, success and beauty. Upon its release, "Pop Diva" received positive reviews from music critics, who commended the sound, catchiness and deliveries. However, minor criticism was aimed towards the songwriting.

Commercially, "Pop Diva" experienced moderate success in Japan, reaching number four on the Oricon Singles Chart and number 11 on the Japan Hot 100, the latter published by Billboard. Despite this, the single was certified gold by the Recording Industry Association of Japan (RIAJ) for digital purchases of 100,000 units. An accompanying music video was directed by Ryuji Seki, which depicted the singer in a futuristic city and laboratory. In order to promote the single, Koda featured in one commercial in Japan and was included on two concert tours.

== Background and composition ==
"Pop Diva" was written, composed, and produced by Japanese artist Lil' Showy. "Pop Diva" was the only song from her Dejavu album not to have included Koda in the writing or composing process; the last time she did not contribute to writing, composing, or producing any songs were from her eighth studio album, Universe (2010). It was selected as the third and final single from Dejavu and was released in Japan on 2 February 2011 by Rhythm Zone, a sub-label from Avex Trax. The Maxi CD version of the single contains the B-side "Black Candy", and includes the two songs instrumental versions. A bonus DVD includes the music video and making video of "Pop Diva".

"Pop Diva" is a "fast-paced" dance-pop song that borrows influences from numerous genres including electropop and hip-hop. Koda's vocals are heavily processed through autotune and vocoder pyrotechnics, and are delivered during the chorus and chorus-breaks. According to Bradley Stern at MuuMuse and a reviewer from J-Station, the lyrics to "Pop Diva" emphasize themes of Koda's successful career, beauty, and narcissism; Stern exemplified the lyric as an example of this; "I'm the pop diva. Most beautiful, powerful, and talented girl on the planet. Are you ready for me? Let's go!" Structure-wise, Stern then noted;

Aided by the same chord progression as Spears' "Gimme More" and a stinging bass beat a la Far East Movement's "Like a G6, "Pop Diva" is Kumi's hottest, noisiest dance affair since 2007’s "But"... I'm also detecting a touch of Kesha influence–and by that, I mean I could definitely hear this one playing while I upchuck some glitter in the back of a dingy gay bar.

== Reception ==
=== Critical response ===
"Pop Diva" received favorable reviews from most music critics. Stern was positive towards the single, commending the composition and production. In conclusion, he stated "'Pop Diva' is noisy, overly Auto-Tuned and seriously disjointed, but also kind of brilliant in places. That's just the way good pop works, you know?". Paige Lim from Straits Times reviewed Koda's Walk of My Live 2015 concert tour, and was positive towards the original versions of "Pop Diva", and "House Party" and "Poppin' Love Cocktails" from Walk of My Life (2015) and Japonesque (2012), respectively; she labelled them "fast-paced, catchy tunes..." A reviewer from CD Journal was positive, commending the production of the song and labelled the composition "impressive". Tetsuo Hiraga from Hot Express was positive in his review. He commented that "Pop Diva" was a "complete dance tune" for everyone, and commended Koda's "provocative" and "attitude" delivery. However, a reviewer from Arcadey.net criticized the song's composition as "crunk hip-hop trash". In March–April 2012, an online poll was hosted on Popjustice by fans ranking their favourite single by Koda. With over 70 singles from her back-catalogue listed, "Pop Diva" ranked at 21 with three people rating it ten points, and another three people rating it the lowest score at six.

=== Commercial performance ===
In Japan, "Pop Diva" debuted at three on the Japanese Oricon Daily Chart with an estimated 19,000 units on its first day; it reached number four on the weekly Oricon Singles Chart with over 32,000 units sold. (Note: Sales provided by Oricon database and are rounded to the nearest thousand copies.) "Pop Diva", alongside her 2008 single "Anytime", were her lowest chart singles since her 2006 single "Ima Sugu Hoshii" which peaked at number five; the positions of all three songs were then surpassed by Koda's 2011 single "Ai o Tomenaide", which reached number six. "Pop Diva" also became her lowest selling original single since her 2005 single "Hot Stuff", and just reached over the 37,000 sales limit from her 2010 single "Can We Go Back". The song lasted four weeks in the chart, and sold over 40,000 units. "Pop Diva" also reached number eleven on the Japan Hot 100 chart, lasted seven weeks on the chart, and was certified gold by the Recording Industry Association of Japan (RIAJ) for digital shipments of 100,000 units. This was her last single to receive a gold certification until her 2011 single, "Love Me Back". The song failed to chart in Taiwan, her first single since "Anytime".

== Music video ==
Still from the music video "Pop Diva", showing Koda hanging from a rope and being hauled away by an airship.

The music video for "Pop Diva" was directed by Seki, and the concert is based on the 2010 film Inception. A promo for the video premiered on Avex Trax's YouTube channel on 17 January 2011. A short version, with a duration of one minute and thirty-three seconds, premiered on 21 May 2011 on Avex's YouTube channel.

the video opens with Kumi dreaming in a blue room, attached to several cords; a single blood tear streams from her closed eye. The video begins with her covered in dirt and jumping off of a high-rise building with the machines in the room where she dreams going haywire. In the dream, she is searching for a book in a library carrying information on the task at hand: As she reads the words, the library begins collapsing, ending the stage in the dream. The scene shifts to where she is trying to avoid being hit by lasers and escapes by taking hold of a rope and being hauled away by an airship, much like what was used in the music video for Last Angel, featuring TVXQ.

Unfortunately, the airship is attacked and Kumi drops, landing on the high-rise building from the opening scene. There, she is ambushed and fights with the opposer. In the midst of the fight, she plants a self-destruct mechanism on him and jumps off of the building. The device destructs and Kumi wakes, the goal of the dream being completed.

== Live performances and other appearances ==
"Pop Diva" has been performed on two of Koda's concert tours. Its first appearance was on her Dejavu Live Tour in 2011, where it was included in the first segment of the concert. The song's most recent appearance was included on her Premium Night: Love & Songs concert tour in 2012–2013. "Pop Diva" was remixed especially for the show, and was included in the middle segment. "Pop Diva" has been included on two of Koda's remix albums: the KOZMR Lucas Valentine remix on Beach Mix (2012), and the House Nation Sunset in Ibiza remix on the bonus track edition of Koda Kumi Driving Hit's 5 (2013).

== Track list ==
- Japanese CD single
1. "Pop Diva" – 3:32
2. "Black Candy" – 3:12
3. "Pop Diva" (instrumental) – 3:32
4. "Black Candy" (instrumental) – 3:12
- Japanese CD and DVD single
1. "Pop Diva" – 3:32
2. "Black Candy" – 3:12
3. "Pop Diva" (instrumental) – 3:32
4. "Black Candy" (instrumental) – 3:12
5. "Pop Diva" (music video)
6. "Pop Diva" (making video)
- Digital EP
1. "Pop Diva" – 3:32
2. "Black Candy" – 3:12
3. "Pop Diva" (instrumental) – 3:32
4. "Black Candy" (instrumental) – 3:12
- Digital music video download
1. "Pop Diva" (music video)

== Credits and personnel ==
Credits adapted from the liner notes of Dejavu.

- Koda Kumi – vocals, background vocals, songwriting
- Lil' Showy – composer
- Matthew Tishler – songwriting, composer
- Liz Rodrigues – songwriting, composer
- Erik Alcock – songwriting, composer
- Adam Royce – songwriting, composer
- Seki – director
- Rhythm Zone – management, label
- Avex Trax – parent label, management

== Charts ==
Chart (2008)	Peak position
Japan Daily Singles Chart (Oricon)	3
Japan Weekly Singles Chart (Oricon)	4
Japan Weekly Singles Chart (Japan Hot 100)	11
Japan Hot Singles Sales Weekly Chart (Japan Hot 100)	7
Japan Radio Songs Weekly Chart (Japan Hot 100)	12

== Certifications and sales ==
Region	Certification	Certified units/sales
Japan (RIAJ) Digital single	Gold	100,000^{*}
Japan physical sales	—	40,000
^{*} Sales figures based on certification alone.

== Release history ==
Region	Date	Format	Label
Japan	February 2, 2011	CD single	Avex Trax; Rhythm Zone
Japan	February 2, 2011	DVD single	Avex Trax; Rhythm Zone
Japan	February 2, 2011	Digital EP	Avex Music Creative Inc.
Australia	February 2, 2011	Digital EP	Avex Music Creative Inc.
New Zealand	February 2, 2011	Digital EP	Avex Music Creative Inc.
United Kingdom	February 2, 2011	Digital EP	Avex Music Creative Inc.
Germany	February 2, 2011	Digital EP	Avex Music Creative Inc.
Ireland	February 2, 2011	Digital EP	Avex Music Creative Inc.
France	February 2, 2011	Digital EP	Avex Music Creative Inc.
Spain	February 2, 2011	Digital EP	Avex Music Creative Inc.
Taiwan	February 2, 2011	Digital EP	Avex Music Creative Inc.

== Alternate versions ==
Pop Diva

1. Pop Diva: found on the single and corresponding album, Dejavu (2011)
2. Pop Diva [instrumental]: found on the single (2011)
3. Pop Diva [House Nation Sunset in Ibiza remix]: found on Koda Kumi Driving Hit's 3 (2011)
4. Pop Diva feat. Far☆East Movement [DJ Virman remix]: found on Koda Kumi Driving Hit's 3 (2011)
5. Pop Diva [Kozmr Remix Lucas Valentine]: found on Beach Mix (2012)
