= Eternity: Love & Songs =

Eternity ~Love & Songs~

Studio album by Koda Kumi
- Released: October 13, 2010
- Recorded: 2010
- Genre: Pop; acoustic; electronic
- Label: Rhythm Zone

Koda Kumi chronology
Koda Kumi Driving Hit's 2 (2010)	Eternity ~Love & Songs~ (2010)	Dejavu (2011)

Eternity ~Love & Songs~ (stylized as ETERNITY ~Love & Songs~) is the first cover album by Japanese pop-R&B singer-songwriter Koda Kumi. It contains hip-hop and electronic arrangements of many older Japanese songs released between 1970 and 1990. The album charted at No. 3 on Oricon and remained on the charts for fourteen weeks. The release of the album was also to celebrate Koda Kumi's ten years as an artist.

"Be My Baby" and "Megumi no Hito" became the two promotional tracks for the album. A remix of "Megumi no Hito" can be found on Koda Kumi Driving Hit's 4 and a "Be My Baby" remix is found on Beach Mix.

The album is certified Gold for shipment of 100,000 copies.

== Information ==
Eternity ~Love & Songs~ is the first cover album by Japanese singer-songwriter Koda Kumi, released October 13, 2010. The album contains hip hop and electronic arrangements of various Japanese songs released during the 1970s and 1980s. It charted No. 3 on the Oricon Albums Charts and remained on the charts for fourteen consecutive weeks. The album's release was also to celebrate Kumi's tenth anniversary as a solo artist, having debuted on December 10, 2000, with her song "Take Back."

Although the album contained predominately songs from the 1970s and 1980s, Kumi also covered "0-ji Mae no Tsunderella," which was recorded and released by her younger sister, misono, earlier in the year. misono had also covered Ouyang Fei Fei's "Love•Is•Over" on her cover album Cover Album, released in January 2009, which Kumi also covered for this album (track #2).

To help promote the album, the tracks "Be My Baby" (stylized as "BE MY BABY") and "Megumi no Hito" (め組のひと / Best of Me) were used as the two main promotional tracks. Both tracks were later given music videos on the first DVD to her ninth studio album Dejavu. The music videos for the two songs mirrored each other in color coordination and overall style. "Be My Baby," which was more aggressive than its 1989 counterpart by Japanese band COMPLEX, was performed with Kumi and her dancers dressed in black in a dark room, while an LED dance floor flashed with "Be My Baby" in white on a black background. "Megumi no Hito" kept the overall upbeat jazz vibe of the original 1983 song by seven-man doo-wop group Rats & Star, and had Kumi and her dancers donning modified cocktail server uniforms in a white room, while the LED dance floor would flash black letters on a white background.

Of the songs on the album, "Be My Baby" became the most popular, having been performed the most at several venues. This included a-nation's 10th Anniversary for Life Charge & Go!, the Japan-Vietnam Friendship Music Festival and at Isle of MTV Miyakojima.

== Music videos ==
While there were no corresponding music videos with the release of the album, videos for "Be My Baby" and "Megumi no Hito" were later released on her 2011 album Dejavu. Both videos would contrast each other, with "Be My Baby" being performed in a dark room with a black dance floor, and "Megumi no Hito" being performed in a white room with a white dance floor.

"Be My Baby" carried a more aggressive tone than the original version done in 1989 by rock back Complex. For the video, Kumi and her dancers were dressed in black and wearing sunglasses. The video was shot in a dark room with a black LED dance floor that would flash the words "Be My Baby" in white.

"Megumi no Hito" kept the overall upbeat jazz vibe of the original 1983 version by group Rats & Star. In the video, Kumi and her dancers wore modified cocktail server uniforms in a white room. While the studio was the same as "Be My Baby," the LED dance floor was white, instead flashing the letters in black. The dance performed during the song's chorus was similar to the original dance by Rats & Star.

== Live performances ==
=== Eternity ~Love and Songs~ at Billboard Live ===
On December 6, 2010, Kumi began a sixteen show tour throughout Osaka and Tokyo to celebrate her tenth anniversary. She performed all the songs from the album and on February 23, 2011, she released the concert on DVD Eternity ~Love & Songs~ at Billboard Live. The live tour was accompanied by a live band.

=== a-nation 10th Anniversary for Life Charge and Go! ===
On July 30, 2011, a-nation held its tenth anniversary and lined up several artists to perform. This included Kumi, who performed "Be My Baby," "Poppin' love cocktail", which featured not only TEEDA, but all of the members of Back-On, and "Bling Bling Bling" which featured rapper AK-69. This was also the first performance in which Kumi and BACK-ON's Kenji03 shared a stage and came out officially as a couple. They would be married in December of the same year.

=== Japan-Vietnam Friendship Music Festival ===
On October 9, 2011, Kumi performed "Be My Baby and "Ai no Kotoba" during her performance for the Japan-Vietnam Friendship Music Festival, which was held in Hanoi, Vietnam. She performed alongside AKB48, EXILE, w-inds, AAA, Natsuko Godai and Ryōtarō Sugi.

=== Isle of MTV Miyakojima ===
Kumi performed "By My Baby" in 2013 during Isle of MTV Miyakojima, where she performed alongside several other artists. These included AK-69, BACK-ON, INFINITY16, Daishi Dance, Far☆East Movement, Taku Takahashi, Miliyah Kato and WORLD ORDER.

== Track listing ==
No.	Title	Lyrics	Music	Original artist/ Arranger	Length
1.	"Tattoo"	Yuriko Mori	Annri Sekine	Akina Nakamori • Seiji Kameda	4:18
2.	"Love Is Over" (ラヴ・イズ・オーヴァー)	Kaoru Ito	Kaoru Ito	Ouyang Fei Fei • Coldfeet	5:13
3.	"Sweet Memories"	Takashi Matsumoto	Masaaki Omura	Seiko Matsuda • Hiroshi Nakamura （i-dep/Sotte Bosse）	3:51
4.	"Ienai yo" (言えないよ / Can't say)	Kan Chin Fa	Takashi Tsushimi	Hiromi Go • Gakushi	5:18
5.	"0-ji Mae no Tsunderella"	misono	Naruya Ito	misono • Akira Murata	4:35
6.	"Megumi no Hito" (め組のひと / Best of Me)	Masao Urino	Daisuke Inoue	Rats & Star • Alfred "The Angel" Tuoheny	3:37
7.	"Be My Baby"	Kōji Kikkawa	Tomoyasu Hotei	COMPLEX • TAZZ	3:17
8.	"Chiisa na Koi no Uta" (小さな恋のうた / Little love song)	Kiyosaku	Mongol800	Mongol800 • Zentarō Watanabe	4:50
9.	"Heart of Red Wine" (ワインレッドの心 / WAIN REDDO no Kokoro)	Yōsui Inoue	Kōji Tamaki	Anzen Chitai • UTA	3:56
10.	"I Love You, SAYONARA"	Fumiya Fujii	Yuji Ohdoi	The Checkers • Jun Tanaka	5:04
11.	"Swallowtail Butterfly 〜Ai no Uta〜" (あいのうた / Love Song)	Shunji Iwai • Chara • Takeshi Kobayashi	Takeshi Kobayashi	Yen Town Band • Suemitsu & the Suemith • Ittetsu Gen	4:44
12.	"Sayonara no Mukogawa" (さよならの向う側 / Other Side of Goodbye)	Yoko Aki	Ryudo Uzaki	Momoe Yamaguchi • h-wonder • Ittetsu Gen	5:17

== Oricon Charts (Japan) ==
Release	Oricon Singles Chart	Peak position	First week sales (copies)	Sales total (copies)
October 13, 2010	Daily Chart	2		89,512
October 13, 2010	Weekly Chart	3	46,361	89,512
October 13, 2010	Monthly Chart	8	72,252	89,512
October 13, 2010	Yearly Chart (2010)	95	87,378	89,512

== Alternate versions ==
Megumi no Hito

1. Megumi no Hito: Found on the album (2010)
2. Megumi no Hito [THE LOWBROWS Remix]: Found on Koda Kumi Driving Hit's 4 (2012)

BE MY BABY

1. BE MY BABY: Found on the album (2010)
2. BE MY BABY [4 Skips Remix]: Found on Beach Mix (2012)
