= Re(cord) =

Studio album by Koda Kumi
- Released: November 13, 2019
- Recorded: 2019
- Genre: J-pop
- Length: 56:27
- Label: Rhythm Zone
- Producer: Koda Kumi

Koda Kumi chronology
| Koda Kumi Driving Hit's 9 -Special Edition- (2019) | Re(cord) (2019) | Re(mix) (2020) |

Singles from Re(cord)
- 1. "Eh Yo" Released: July 3, 2019; 2. "Summer Time" Released: July 10, 2019; 3. "Do Me" Released: July 17, 2019; 4. "Goldfinger 2019" Released: August 14, 2019; 5. "Put Your Hands Up!!!" Released: September 13, 2019; 6. "OMG" Released: September 18, 2019; 7. "Strip" Released: October 16, 2019; 8. "Get Naked" Released: October 23, 2019; 9. "Again" Released: October 30, 2019

Re(cord) (stylized as re(CORD)) is the sixteenth studio album by Japanese singer-songwriter Koda Kumi. It was released on November 13, 2019, which coincided with Kumi's 37th birthday. It was released in four editions: CD only, CD+DVD, CD+Blu-ray and a CD+3DVD fan club edition.

Prior to the album, Kumi released nine digital singles to help promote the album: "Eh Yo", "Summer Time", "Do Me", "Goldfinger 2019", "Put Your Hands Up!!!", "OMG", "Strip", "Get Naked" and "Again". Of those released, three had corresponding music videos. "Goldfinger 2019", "Strip" and "Again".

It debuted at number four on the weekly Oricon Albums Chart.

== Background ==
The album was preceded by nine digital singles: "Eh Yo", "Summer Time", "Do Me", "Goldfinger 2019", "Put Your Hands Up!!!", "OMG", "Strip", "Get Naked" and "Again". All nine singles were placed on the album.

The album was released in four editions: CD only, CD+DVD, CD+Blu-ray and a limited fan club CD+3DVD edition.

The CD contained four new tracks, along with the previously released digital singles and the unreleased cover of Ricky Martin's "Livin' La Vida Loca", which had been released on avex's official YouTube in July. The first DVD and Blu-ray contained the corresponding music videos for "Again", "Goldfinger 2019" and the aforementioned "Livin' La Vida Loca", and the album exclusive "k", along with a dance version. The second and third DVD were only released on the CD+3DVD fan club edition. The second DVD housed the behind-the-scenes making videos for the music videos "Goldfinger 2019" and "Livin' La Vida Loca", and the overall making video for the album. The third DVD held the making video for "Again".

To help promote the album, four of the nine singles were used for promotional purposes. "Eh Yo" was used as the Hanazono support song for the 2019 Rugby World Cup. She performed "Summer Time", "Eh Yo" and "Do Me" during a-nation 2019 on August 18, 2019. On August 10, She performed the cover of Hiromi Go's "Goldfinger '99" at the 2019 Jingu Gaien Fireworks Festival. "Strip" was used as the theme song for part two of Otona no Tsuchi Dora series.

== Promotional activities ==
To help promote the album, some of the songs were used for promotional purposes.

"Eh Yo" was used as the Hanazono support song for the 2019 Rugby World Cup. Koda Kumi debuted the song on June 15, 2019, with a performance at Tennōji Park in Tennōji-ku, Osaka for the "100 Days To Go" event. She also performed "Eh Yo" during TV Tokyo's Music Festival 2019, along with her 2007 song "Ai no Uta".

She performed "Summer Time", "Eh Yo" and "Do Me" during a-nation 2019 on August 18, 2019. On August 10, Kumi performed the cover of Hiromi Go's "Goldfinger '99" at the 2019 Jingu Gaien Fireworks Festival.

"Strip" was used as the theme song for part two of the Tokai TV and Fuji TV series Otona no Tsuchi Dora (オトナの土ドラ), titled Rika (リカ). A special promotional video was uploaded on avex's official YouTube on October 15, 2019. The album exclusive track "Merry Go Round" was used in a television commercial for T-Garden's loveil contact lenses.

== Commercial performance ==
Re(cord) debuted in the top five of the daily Oricon Albums Charts at No. 4, becoming Kumi's third consecutive album to not take the number one spot (AND charted at No 6 and DNA charted at No. 2). Within the first week, the album sold 13,533 copies.

By the end of the second week, the album had dropped in rank to No. 49, selling an additional 940 units.

== Single: Eh Yo ==
"Eh Yo"

Single by Koda Kumi

from the album re(CORD)
- Released: July 3, 2019
- Recorded: 2019
- Label: Rhythm Zone
- Songwriters: Koda Kumi, Hi-yunk
- Producer: Koda Kumi

Koda Kumi singles chronology
| "Never Enough" (2017) | "Eh Yo" (2019) | "Summer Time" (2019) |

"Eh Yo" is the first single released by Japanese artist Koda Kumi post her studio albums DNA and And, and sixty-third overall. It became her first single in nearly two years, with her last being "Never Enough" (2017). It also became the first of three digital singles she would release in July 2019, alongside "Summer Time" and "Do Me".

The single was released as a digital single on July 3, 2019.

=== Information ===
"Eh Yo" is the sixty-third single released by Japanese singer-songwriter Koda Kumi on July 3, 2019. It was officially announced on June 17, 2019, having debuted on June 15 with a performance at Tennōji Park. The single became her first in nearly two years, with her prior being Never Enough in December 2017.

Due to having no physical release, the song did not chart on the Oricon Singles Chart. However, the song was given a five star ranking on the popular digital music store RecoChoku. The single was released as a digital download, and distributed among sites like RecoChoku, iTunes and Amazon Music.

The song was written and composed by Kumi's husband, Back-On lead vocalist Kenji, who is credited at "Hi-yunk". The lyrical portion was written by Kumi herself.

To help promote the song, "Eh Yo" was used as the Hanazono support song of the 2019 Rugby World Cup.

=== Cover art ===
The single's cover art was inspired by her 2019 concert tour Live Tour 2019 ～re(LIVE)～, which held a dual concept from her Black Cherry and Japonesque concert tours.

=== Track listing ===
Digital download
| No. | Title | Lyrics | Music | Arranger(s) | Length |
|---|---|---|---|---|---|
| 1. | "Eh Yo" | Koda Kumi | Hi-yunk | Hi-yunk | 4:11 |

== Music videos ==
While two of the corresponding singles had their music videos placed on the first DVD/Blu-ray, there were two that were not added: "Strip" and "Get Naked".

"Strip" featured Koda Kumi in the stylized kimono she wore during promoting and the tour for Live Tour 2019 re(LIVE), which carried a dual concept from her Black Cherry (2006) and Japonesque (2012) studio albums. Other scenes included her in a glass box, donning a dress similar to the one she wore during her introductory performance for Live Tour 2007 ~Black Cherry~. "Get Naked" was filmed on the same set the album covers were shot. In the video, Kumi is shown entangled in the cords, symbolizing being a "slave to music". She is also shown carrying a blacklight, which is typically used to find substances that cannot be seen by the naked eye. A preview of the video was uploaded to Avex's official YouTube.

The music video for "k," is an upbeat dance number. Kumi said the dance was based on her workout routine, which typically includes yoga and light strength training. In the video, Kumi and her dancers wear bright colors (lime green and orange in one segment and pink and yellow in the other) while performing the dance with similarly colored backdrops. Other scenes include Kumi donning braids with balloons tying off the ends, lifting her hair. The style gained coverage on various sites, becoming known as "colorful balloon hair". The style received predominantly positive comments, though some were questioning the young style on the seasoned artist. The video was uploaded on her official YouTube a week prior to the album's release on November 5 to assist promotion. An alternate dance version was also released on the album, which omitted the scenes of her "balloon hair" and only focused on the dances between the two sets.

For "Again", Kumi revisited past styles, taking from two of her most popular winter-time ballads, "Ai no Uta" (2007) and "You" (2005). The teardrop crystals and a similar dress from "Ai no Uta" were used, as was walking in the snow wearing a knit cap and large shawl from "You". The message, overall, was to grow with the past, instead of from it. The music video was uploaded on the official YouTube on October 29, 2019.

The videos for "Goldfinger 2019" and "Livin' La Vida Loca" were predominantly the same. On July 20, 2019, Koda Kumi released the cover of Ricky Martin's hit "Livin' la Vida Loca" via Avex's official YouTube. Three weeks later on August 13, she released "Goldfinger 2019", which was the Japanese remake." Both videos were nearly identical, with only slight changes. Both videos open with Kumi spinning down onto the stage via a cloth rope while donning bright, translucent yellow garb. As the song picks up, people begin to dance on the dance floor as various signs light up. During the chorus, both Kumi and the dancers perform the same choreography. An alternate version of Kumi is approached by a Caucasian male. After he treats her to a night out, she leaves him, watching on in satisfaction as he tries and fails to find her. It then breaks to an aggressive beat where Kumi and the dancers perform a modern hip-hop dance. This portion of the video was performed in black and white. When it picks up to the prior set, the dancers, including Kumi, are shown dancing in the rain. The video ends with Kumi performing the tango with another dancer as the credits roll.

== Track listing ==
CD
| No. | Title | Lyrics | Music | Length |
|---|---|---|---|---|
| 1. | "Do Me" | Koda Kumi | T-SK • HIROMI • Joleen Belle | 3:23 |
| 2. | "Get Naked" | Koda Kumi | Erika Nuri • Michael Anthony Naylor • Ronald M. Ferebee Jr. • Lindsay Johnson | 3:20 |
| 3. | "Strip" | Koda Kumi | DWB • Katerina Bramley | 3:33 |
| 4. | "k," | Koda Kumi | Matt Wong • Paulina Cerrilla • G'harah "PK" Degeddingseze • Jamie Jones | 3:29 |
| 5. | "Rich & Famous" (featuring Sean Paul) | Koda Kumi • Sean Paul | Toby Gad • Ty Dolla Sign • Lady G • Tulisa | 4:09 |
| 6. | "Again" | Koda Kumi | 2SB | 5:20 |
| 7. | "Merry Go Round" | Koda Kumi • Henrik Nordenback • Christian Fast • J-Son | Henrik Nordenback • Christian Fast • J-Son | 4:10 |
| 8. | "Eh Yo" (-re(CORD) edit-) | Koda Kumi | Hi-yunk | 4:24 |
| 9. | "Goldfinger 2019" | Desmond Child • Draco Rosa • Kan Chinfa (Japanese translation) | Junnosuke Fujita • Baba Osuke • Yuto Shimizu • Shouya Matsuzaki • Hikaru Teraya • Makoto Nagatomo • Yoshihiro Tsujimoto | 4:33 |
| 10. | "Put Your Hands Up!!!" | Koda Kumi • 2SB | 2SB | 4:24 |
| 11. | "Summer Time" | Koda Kumi | Justin Reinstein • Maria Marcus | 3:36 |
| 12. | "OMG" | Koda Kumi | T-SK • HIROMI • Joleen Belle • SIRIUS • Jasmine Anderson • Johan Johan Ramström | 3:56 |
| 13. | "Shutout" | Koda Kumi | Andreas Öberg • Kanata Okajima • Soma Genda | 3:38 |
| 14. | "Livin' la Vida Loca" | Desmond Child • Draco Rosa | Desmond Child • Draco Rosa | 4:32 |
| Total length: | | | | 56:27 |

DVD/Blu-ray
| No. | Title | Length |
|---|---|---|
| 1. | "k," (music video) | 3:28 |
| 2. | "k," (dance version) (music video) | 3:25 |
| 3. | "Again" (music video) | 5:24 |
| 4. | "Goldfinger 2019" (music video) | 4:32 |
| 5. | "Livin' La Vida Loca" (music video) | 4:32 |
| Total length: | | 21:21 |

DVD2: Behind-the-Scenes
| No. | Title | Length |
|---|---|---|
| 1. | "Goldfinger 2019 & Livin' La Vida Loca" (making of) |
| 2. | "Album『re(CORD)』" (making of) |

DVD3: Behind-the-Scenes
| No. | Title | Length |
|---|---|---|
| 1. | "Again" (making of the music video) |

== Charts ==
| Chart (2019) | Peak position | Total sales |
|---|---|---|
| Japan Hot Albums (Billboard Japan) | 5 | |

| Release | Chart | Peak position | Chart run | Total sales |
|---|---|---|---|---|
| November 13, 2019 | Oricon Daily Albums Chart | 4 | | |
| November 13, 2019 | Oricon Weekly Albums Chart | 4 | 5 weeks | |
| November 13, 2019 | Oricon Monthly Album Charts | 17 | 1 month | 15,003 |
