= Beach Mix =

Remix album by Koda Kumi
- Released: August 1, 2012
- Recorded: 2002–2012
- Genre: House
- Label: Rhythm Zone

Koda Kumi chronology
Koda Kumi Driving Hit's 4 (2012)	Beach Mix (2012)	Color the Cover (2013)

Beach Mix is Koda Kumi's sixth remix album, out August 1, 2012. It is her first album to feature a playbutton - the album contained on an mp3 player in a button. It comes in three editions: CD, CD+DVD and CD+DVD+Playbutton. Beach Mix became her highest charting remix album, coming in at #4 on Oricon and staying on the charts for seven weeks.

It features a new song and music video: "Whatchu Waitin' On?". It is also her first album released since giving birth to her and Kenji03's son, with the music video being filmed while she was pregnant (in the video, only Kumi's upper body is shown).

== Track listing ==
Official track list.

=== CD ===
1. "Whatchu Waitin' On?"
  Lyrics: Koda Kumi • Matthew Tishler
  Music: Daniel J.Plante • Matthew Tishler
2. "KO-SO-KO-SO" (Prog5 Remix)
3. "Bling Bling Bling feat. AK-69" (Electro Rave Allstars Remix)
4. "Hey baby!" (FUTURE HOUSE UNITED Remix)
5. "V.I.P. feat. T-PAIN" (Sunset In Ibiza Remix)
6. "Pop Diva" (KOZMR Remix Lucas Valentine)
7. "Be My Baby" (4 Skips Remix)
8. "No Tricks" (Shohei Matsumoto & Junichi Matsuda Remix)
9. "Heat feat. MEGARYU" (REO Remix)
10. "Cutie Honey" (HABANERO POSSE REMIX)
11. "D.D.D. feat. SOULHEAD" (Pink Chameleons Remix)
12. "Come With Me" (Overhead Champion Remix)
13. "Twinkle" (R-midwest Remix)
14. "Lick me♥" (Floorbreaker Remix)
15. "Cherry Girl" (Sunset In Ibiza Remix)
16. "Taboo" (KOZMR Remix スグル・ヤマモト)

=== DVD ===
1. "Whatchu Waitin' On?" (Music Video)
2. "Whatchu Waitin' On?" (Making Video)
3. "a-nation & Rhythm Nation BEST SELECTION"
  "Come With Me" (a-nation'03)
  "Cutie Honey" (a-nation'05)
  "real Emotion" (a-nation'05)
  "D.D.D." (Rhythm Nation'06)
  "Unmei" (Rhythm Nation'06)
  "Ningyo-hime" (Rhythm Nation'06)
  "Cherry Girl" (Rhythm Nation'06)
  "girls" (a-nation'07)
  "Lady Go!" (a-nation'08)
  "Moon Crying" (a-nation'08)
  "Freaky" (a-nation'08)
  "Lick me♥" (a-nation'09)
  "Ecstasy" (a-nation'09)
  "Lollipop" (a-nation'10)
  "Universe" (a-nation'10)
  "Be My Baby" (a-nation'11)
  "Bling Bling Bling" (a-nation'11)

== Oricon Sales Chart (Japan) ==
Release	Chart	Peak position	Debut sales	Sales total
August 1, 2012	Oricon Daily Charts	3	14,391	44,357
August 1, 2012	Weekly Chart	4	25,643	44,357
