= Japonesque (album) =

- CD+2DVD cover

Studio album by Koda Kumi
- Released: January 25, 2012
- Recorded: 2011
- Genre: J-pop
- Length: 71:00
- Label: Avex Entertainment Inc.; Avex Taiwan; Avex Trax; Rhythm Zone
- Producer: Max Matsuura; Toby Gad; Tommy Clint; Hiro; Bardur Haberg; A Beatard; Dee. C; Matthew Tisher; Koool Kojak

Koda Kumi chronology
Koda Kumi Driving Hit's 3 (2011)	Japonesque (2012)	Koda Kumi Driving Hit's 4 (2012)

Singles from Japonesque
- 1. "4 Times" Released: August 17, 2011; 2. "Ai wo Tomenaide" Released: September 21, 2011; 3. "Love Me Back" Released: November 29, 2011

Japonesque (capitalized as JAPONESQUE) is the tenth studio album by Japanese recording artist Koda Kumi. It was released on January 25, 2012 by Rhythm Zone, just under a year after her previous album, Dejavu (2011). Japonesque marks Koda's tenth consecutive studio album to be produced by Japanese producer and manager Max Matsuura, amongst many other producers, while she contributes to the album as the lead vocalist, background vocalist, and songwriter for the majority of the songs. Recorded in Japanese with minor phrases in English language, Japonesque is a Japanese pop album with numerous musical elements such as dance music, R&B, electronica, and rock music.

Japonesque was recorded in Japan and the United States, making it Koda's third studio album recorded in the latter country; additional production and mastering was handled in the United States. Upon the album's release, it was met with positive reviews from music critics, who commended the album's production and praised the mixture of musical genres alongside Koda's vocals. However, the length of the material, Koda's songwriting, and the amount of musical genres were criticized. Commercially, Japonesque was successful; it became Koda's sixth studio album to reach the top spot on Japan's Oricon Albums Chart, and was certified gold by the Recording Industry Association of Japan (RIAJ) for shipments of 100,000 units. The album charted on Korea's Gaon Album Chart and Taiwan's G-Music Albums Chart.

Three singles were released from Japonesque, including one extended play and six promotional. The three singles; 4 Times, "Ai o Tomenaide", and "Love Me Back", performed moderately on Japan's Oricon Singles Chart whilst the latter two received certifications by RIAJ. The album tracks "Boom Boom Boys", "Brave", "Escalate", "No Man's Land", "Slow", and "So Nice" served as the album's promotional tracks with accompanying music videos. Koda promoted the album on her 2012 Japonesque concert tour.

== Background and recording ==
In August 2011, it was confirmed by Koda Kumi and her record label Rhythm Zone that she would release a then-upcoming studio album titled Japonesque. Koda asked long-term collaborator, Japanese producer and Rhythm Zone founder Max Matsuura, to produce the album; this marked Koda's tenth consecutive studio album to be produced by Matsuura. Rhythm Zone and its parent label, Avex Trax, enlisted several Western producers such as Toby Gad, Tommy Clint, and Matthew Tisher to collaborate on the album. Koda began recording the album at Avex Studios in Japan around the second quarter of 2011 with Junichi Shinohara, Makoto Yamadoi, Masahiro Kawata, Takeshi Takizawa, and Takuro Iwamoto. To record the track "V.I.P." with American rapper and producer T-Pain, Koda traveled to Los Angeles, California to record her vocals at Strawberrybee Studios and Charlice Studios. She recorded parts of the album track "Slow" in Los Angeles and in Hamburg, Germany, whilst guest vocalist and American rapper Omarion recorded his vocals at Blue Palm Digital Studios in Los Angeles. This marks Koda's third studio album to have parts recorded in North America; she previous recorded material there with her studio albums Kingdom (2008) and Trick (2009).

"Japan has amazing music that only Japanese are capable of making. I want to show the world how amazing Japanese music is!".

—Koda discussing the theme and background of Japonesque.

The material from Japonesque was produced and recorded under a year, one of Koda's quickest spanning projects to date. Koda, Rhythm Zone, and Avex Trax enlisted previous composers and arrangers for the album, such as Bardur Haberg, Mr. Blistah, Gad, Erik Lidbom, amongst others; these composers and arrangers started working with Koda back on Kingdom and further albums onwards. Koda was interviewed in the February 2012 issue of Japan's magazine ViVi, and stated that her main inspiration behind Japonesque was the dominance of Korean music over Japanese music. Koda stated that whilst touring in Vietnam, Singapore, and Taiwan, Korean pop music became hugely recognized within the Asian and Western territories whilst Japanese music was not; she felt that Japonesque "was driven to make an album that would get played abroad and allow people outside of Japan to enjoy J-pop." She concluded in the interview that "Japan has amazing music that only Japanese are capable of making. I want to show the world how amazing Japanese music is!".

== Composition ==
Japonesque is a Japanese pop album with numerous musical elements such as dance music, R&B, electronica, and rock music. David Cirone from J-Generation.com stated that Japonesque "is a powerhouse 19-track release from Koda Kumi that affirms her place in modern J-Pop royalty." A staff member from Rolling Stone Japan noted the prominent musical elements of rock music and R&B.

Majority of the lyrics from Japonesque were written by Koda, including the Japanese and English tracks. On Japonesque, there are a total of six English, seven bilingual, and seven Japanese language tracks. (Note: According to the lyric sheet provided by Avex Trax, Avex Taiwan, and Rhythm Zone, there are five English ("Introduction (Japonesque)", "Boom Boom Boys", "V.I.P.", "Escalate", "Lay Down" and "Poppin' Love Cocktails"), eight bilingual ("So Nice", "Slow", "You Are Not Alone", "Love Me Back", "No Man's Land", "Ko-So-Ko-So", and "Love Technique"), and seven Japanese language tracks (the remaining album tracks).) The two interlude tracks: "Introduction" and "Interlude" to Japonesque are composed with electronic synths, and utilizes musical elements of oriental Japanese music. R&B and further oriental elements have been noted by music critics in the album tracks; "So Nice", featuring Japanese rapper and producer Mr. Blistah, "V.I.P.", featuring American rapper and producer T-Pain, "Slow", featuring American rapper and actor Omarion, and the "Stargate–esque" "Everyday".

Album tracks "Lay Down", "Love Me Back", "In the Air", "Escalate", "Ko-So-Ko-So" and "Love Technique" emphasizes electronic dance music, whilst "Everyday", "Poppin' Love Cocktails", and "Boom Boom Boys" utilize a "faux pop" and "rock" persona. "You Are Not Alone" is an acoustic re-arrangement, which the original composition featured as a b-side track on Koda's single "Ai Wo Tomenaide", whilst the album's closer "All For You" is a demo version of an unreleased studio recording. "No Man's Land" is a rock song that utilizes elements of heavy metal music. The original arrangement of "No Man's Land" was different to the current version; according to Koda, the original arrangement omitted the rapping verses and didn't include heavy rock instrumentation or synthesizers. Zero from JpopJRock.com commented that "No Man's Land" was the only song on the album that didn't suffer from a "sparse" arrangement.

== Release and packaging ==
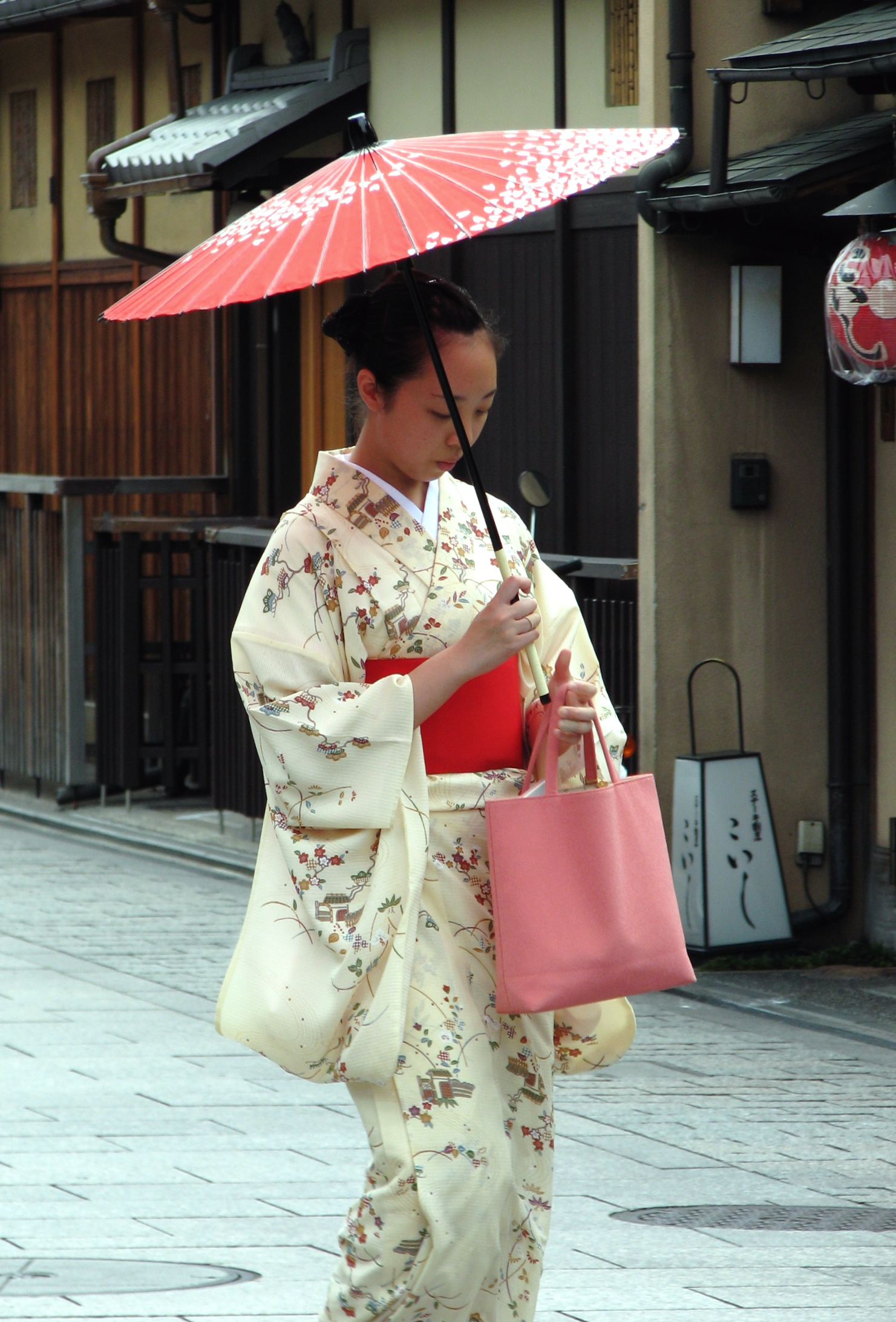
The photo shoot from Japonesque was heavily inspired by traditional Geisha culture and kimono clothing.

Japonesque was released in six different formats on January 25, 2012 by Rhythm Zone. Japonesque is Koda's final studio album after giving birth to her son in July 2012. The stand-alone CD features the nineteen tracks in a jewel case, with first press editions including an obi and a bonus poster. The CD and DVD format features the nineteen tracks, and a bonus DVD with the music videos to each track from the album; this excludes the introduction and interlude tracks from Japonesque. First press editions including an obi and a bonus poster. Three limited-edition box sets were released; the first limited-edition format features the nineteen tracks, and a bonus DVD including the same music videos. The box set also includes a second DVD that includes Koda's top twenty live performances chosen by her, and all of Koda's album commercials. The box set includes a large obi, a large booklet and a small lyric booklet housed in a digipak format. The second limited-edition format features the nineteen tracks on the stand-alone CD. The box set also includes a large B4-size photo album from the Japonesque photoshoot, alongside a 2012 diary and a clear file of the album cover on the front. The third limited-edition format is a jewelcase edition of the first limited-edition box set, with features the nineteen tracks, and a bonus DVD including the same music videos. The box set also includes a second DVD that includes Koda's top twenty live performances chosen by her, and all of Koda's album commercials. The sixth and final format is the worldwide digital release.

All six cover sleeves for Japonesque were photographed by photographer and designer Kazuyoshi Shimomura. The standalone CD has a close-up of Koda looking down to the camera, holding a cigarette holder. The CD and DVD format has a long shot of Koda sitting on a chair with different flowers sitting on the head piece. The three limited-edition box set cover sleeves are similar images with different poses; the first box set has Koda standing in front of a wall with Japanese design; Koda is holding a traditional Oil-paper umbrella and is dressed in a pink kimono she also wore a bikini under her kimono. The second box set artwork has Koda facing towards the camera, similar to the previous box set. The only change in the third box set artwork is that Koda is seen without holding the umbrella. The digital release uses the first limited-edition box set artwork. The booklet and photo shoot were designed by Japanese designer Jun Hirota, and the design was based on traditional Japanese culture and the emphasizing of geisha art. The photo album that came with the second limited-edition box set features a 28-page spread, featuring different images from the Japonesque photo shoot.

== Promotion ==
=== Singles ===
4 Times was released as the album's lead single and only extended play (EP) release on August 17, 2011. The EP consists of four album tracks; "Poppin' Love Cocktail", "In the Air", "V.I.P.", and "Ko-So-Ko-So". The songs received positive reviews from music critics, who praised the EP's composition and commercial appeal. It also achieved moderate success in her native Japan, peaking at number six on the Japanese Oricon Singles Chart, whilst "Poppin' Love Cocktail" peaked at six on the Billboard Japan Hot 100 chart. "Poppin' Love Cocktail" was certified gold by the Recording Industry Association of Japan (RIAJ ) for digital shipments of 100,000 units. The accompanying music videos for all four singles were shot by Ryuji Seki and Hiroaki Higashi in Japan.

"Ai o Tomenaide" was released as the album's second single and first singular single release on September 21, 2011. The song received positive reviews from music critics, who praised the single's pop ballad melody and Koda's vocal abilities. It also achieved moderate success in her native Japan, peaking at number six on the Japanese Oricon Singles Chart, whilst it peaked at seven on the Billboard Japan Hot 100 chart. "Ai o Tomenaide" was certified platinum by RIAJ for digital shipments of 250,000 units. The accompanying music videos for the single was directed by Seki; it features Koda in a room full of lights, with scenes of her holding onto a man.

"Love Me Back" was released as the album's third and final single, and second singular single release on November 30, 2011. The song received positive reviews from music critics, who praised the single's dance composition, production, and commercial appeal. It also achieved moderate success in her native Japan, peaking at number six on the Japanese Oricon Singles Chart, whilst it peaked at nine on the Billboard Japan Hot 100 chart. "Love Me Back" was certified gold by RIAJ for digital shipments of 100,000 units. The accompanying music videos for the single was directed by Higashi; it features Koda driving with two female companions as police officers.

=== Other songs ===
Prior to the album's release, the album tracks; "Boom Boom Boys", "Brave", "Escalate", "No Man's Land", "Slow", and "So Nice" served as the album's promotional tracks with accompanying music videos. Because it was released digitally, "No Man's Land" was ineligible to chart on the Japanese Oricon Singles Chart due to their policy of restricting digital sales and releases, and failed to chart on any competent Billboard Japan or the RIAJ Digital Track Chart singles chart. (Note: The Oricon system in Japan restricts digital sales and formats to chart on their respective Oricon Singles Chart, Oricon Albums Chart, Oricon DVD chart, etc. This was then brought to attention, and the Recording Industry Association of Japan (RIAJ) and North America's Billboard magazine conducted the RIAJ Digital Track Chart (now defunct) and Japan Hot 100.) The video for "Boom Boom Boys" was directed by Seki; it features Koda recovering from a hangover, and shows her going clubbing in a dark grungy setting. The video for "Brave" was directed by Higashi; it features Koda in a room full of clocks, singing and leaning on a small coffee table. The video for "Escalate" was directed by Seki; it features Koda playing chess with a male opponent, and features scenes of her as one of the pieces on the chessboard. The video for "No Man's Land" was directed by Seki; it features Koda in an empty wasteland and abandoned city, surrounded by black skies and dust devils. The video for "Slow" was directed by Higashi; it features Koda and Omarion in front of a fountain that is centred in the middle of a futuristic city. The video for "So Nice" was directed by Seki; it features Koda in a Japanese house, wearing a kimono in front of computer generated imagery flowers and trees. This video does not feature Mr. Blistah.

=== Live performances ===
Koda went on her 2013 Japonesque Tour. She announced the concert after finishing her Premium Night Concert tour. Koda performed a small performance in order to promote her single "Love Me Back". All the album tracks were performed on the concert tour. An album of the concert tour was released on April 20, 2011 in two formats; a triple DVD bundle, and a double Blu-ray release. The DVD reached number one on the Oricon DVD Chart, with over 21,000 units sold in its first week. The DVD stayed in the charts for two weeks, and sold over 23,000 units in that region. The Blu-ray reached number three on the Oricon Blu-ray Daily Chart, with over 3,800 units sold in its first week. However, it failed to reach a weekly position on the Oricon Weekly Blu-ray chart. The live CD was released in Japan through iTunes Store on March 20, 2013. To promote the material from Japonesque, tracks were remixed and produced for Koda's remix series Koda Kumi Driving Hit's 4 and Beach Mix (2012).

== Critical reception ==
Professional ratings
Review scores
Source	Rating
Hot Express	(positive)
J-Generation	(positive)
Rolling Stone	3/5 stars

Japonesque received positive reviews from most music critics. David Cirone from J-Generation.com was positive in his review, stating "Full of confidence and maturity, Koda Kumi still hasn't lost her playful side and unabashed sexiness." Cirone highlighted "Escalate", "Love Me Back", and "No Man's Land" as the album's best tracks and commended the overall composition and commercial appeal. Another positive review came from Tetsuo Hiraga from Hot Express, complimenting Koda's involvement and innovation of the Japanese theme. He commended Koda's "emotional" song writing, and listed Japonesque as one of his most "personally recommended" albums of 2012. A staff member from Rolling Stone Japan highlighted the R&B and rock music, but criticized the lack of personal depth.

== Commercial performance ==
Japonesque debuted at number one on the Japanese Daily Oricon Albums Chart, staying there for an entire week except for Saturday. This resulted in the album debuting atop the Japanese Weekly Oricon Albums Chart, with an estimate 93,000 sold units in its first week of sales. (Note: Sales provided by Oricon database and are rounded to the nearest thousand copies.) This became the highest selling album by a female artist for first week sales of 2012, but also became Koda's first album to sell less than 100,000 units in its first week of sales; her previous album Dejavu was her last with 132,000 units in its first week. Japonesque became Koda's sixth studio album to debut atop the Oricon Albums Chart for both Daily and Weekly rankings. It slipped to number four the following week, shifting over 24,000 units in that region. It fell out the top ten in its third week, placed at number 11 and shifted over 11,000 units in that region. In total, Japonesque spent two weeks in the top ten, nine weeks in the top 100, and over 17 weeks in the top 300 chart.

Japonesque entered the Billboard Top Albums Sales Chart at the top spot, her fourth studio album to do so. It slipped to number five in its second charting week, and stayed in the top ten for two weeks. It lasted 9 weeks in the top 100 chart, with a final charting position at 67. Japonesque also reached number 16 on the Taiwanese Albums Chart, and number 3 on the Taiwanese East Asian Albums Chart. (Note: The G-Music chart was established in July 2005 and only archives the top 20 releases.) (Note: Week references for G-Music: Japonesque 2012 week 6.)

Japonesque was certified gold in April 2010 by the RIAJ for shipments of 100,000 units. This is Koda's first studio album not to shift over 250,000 units in Japan, and her first album not to achieve a platinum certification; her most recent entry was Dejavu. At the end of 2012, Japonesque sold over 151,343 units in Japan; this ranked the ninth best selling album by a female artist, just behind entries from Adele, Ayaka, JuJu, Superfly, Che'Nelle, Kana Nishino, and Namie Amuro.

== Alternate versions ==
"Slow" feat. Omarion

1. "Slow" feat. Omarion
2. "Slow" feat. Omarion (Prog5 vs. Future House United remix): found on Koda Kumi Driving Hit's 4 (2012)

"No Man's Land"

1. "No Man's Land"
2. "No Man's Land" (4 Skips D'n'B remix): found on Koda Kumi Driving Hit's 5 (2013)

"Boom Boom Boys"

1. "Boom Boom Boys"
2. "Boom Boom Boys" (Heavens Wire D'n'B remix): found on Koda Kumi Driving Hit's 6 (2014)

"Escalate"

1. "Escalate"
2. "Escalate" (Vesterbak's Fly-Me-To-Tokyo remix): found on Koda Kumi Driving Hit's 6 (2014)

== Track listing ==
CD
No.	Title	Lyrics	Producers	Length
1.	"Introduction (Japonesque)"	Maria Marcus	Marcus	1:28
2.	"So Nice" (featuring Mr. Blistah)	Koda Kumi	Bárður Háberg	2:44
3.	"Boom Boom Boys"	Koda; Toby Gad; Lindy Robbins; Caterina Torres	Gad	3:28
4.	"V.I.P." (featuring T-Pain)	Koda; Gad; Jessica Cornish; Faheem Nahm	Gad	3:24
5.	"Slow" (featuring Omarion)	Koda	Tommy Clint	3:50
6.	"Brave"	Koda	Daisuke Kahara; Shinjiroh Inoue; Udai Shika	5:08
7.	"Everyday"	Koda; Hiro	Hiro	4:03
8.	"In the Air"	Koda	Erik Lidbom	4:09
9.	"You Are Not Alone" (Acoustic Version)	Koda	A Beatard	4:41
10.	"Interlude (Japonesque)"		Martin Svensson	1:17
11.	"Escalate"	Koda; Aria	Dee. C	3:13
12.	"Love Me Back"	Koda	Matthew Tishler	2:57
13.	"No Man's Land"	Koda Kumi; Mr. Blistah; Pete Kirtley; Jorge Mhondera; Samiya Berrabah	Max Matsuura	4:27
14.	"Ai wo Tomenaide" (愛を止めないで)	Koda	Naohisa Taniguchi; Hitoshi Munakata	5:28
15.	"KO-SO-KO-SO"	Koda; Allan P Grigg; Kenichi Takemoto	Koool Kojak	3:19
16.	"Lay Down"	Koda; Tishler; Adam Royce; Kat Lucas	Beatard; Tishler	3:42
17.	"Love Technique"	Koda	Genie	3:04
18.	"Poppin' Love Cocktail" (featuring Teeda)	Koda; Teeda	Back-On; Jin	5:07
19.	"All For You"	Koda	Yunk	5:23
Total length:				71:00

DVD 1
No.	Title	Director(s)	Length
1.	"Poppin' Love Cocktail" (video clip)	Hiroaki Hitashi
2.	"Boom Boom Boys" (video clip)	Ryuji Seki
3.	"No Man's Land" (video clip)	Seki
4.	"V.I.P." (feat. T-PAIN) (Album Version) (video clip)	Higashi
5.	"KO-SO-KO-SO" (video clip)	Higashi
6.	"Lay Down" (video clip)	Yu-Ya Hara
7.	"Escalate" (video clip)	Seki
8.	"Love Me Back" (Album Version) (video clip)	Higashi
9.	"So Nice" (video clip)	Higashi
10.	"Slow" (featuring Omarion) (video clip)	Higashi
11.	"In the Air" (video clip)	Seki
12.	"Everyday" (video clip)	Higashi
13.	"Love Technique" (video clip)	Seki
14.	"You Are Not Alone" (Acoustic Version) (video clip)	Kunihiko Okazaki
15.	"Ai o Tomenaide" (video clip)	Seki
16.	"Brave" (video clip)	Hara
17.	"All for You" (video clip)	Hara	5:36

DVD 2
No.	Title	Director(s)	Length
1.	"Koda Kumi Best Live Ranking Top 20" (video clip)	Michiro Kato
2.	"TV Commercial Albums Spots" (video clip)	Ryuji Seki

== Charts ==
=== Weekly charts ===
Chart (2012)	Peak position
Japanese Albums (Oricon)	1
Japanese Top Albums (Billboard)	1
Taiwanese Combo Albums (G-Music)	16

Chart (2017)	Peak position
Taiwanese J-pop Albums (G-Music)	1

=== Monthly charts ===
Chart (2012)	Peak position
Japanese Albums (Oricon)	3

=== Year-end charts ===
Chart (2012)	Position
Japanese Albums (Oricon)	37

== Certifications ==
Region	Certification	Certified units/sales
Japan (RIAJ)	Gold	151,343

== See also ==
- List of Oricon number-one albums of 2012
