= Ai o Tomenaide =

Single by Koda Kumi

from the album Japonesque
- Released: September 21, 2011
- Recorded: 2011
- Genre: J-pop, ballad
- Label: Rhythm Zone
- Composer: Naohisa Taniguchi
- Lyricist: Koda Kumi

Koda Kumi singles chronology
"4 Times" (2011)	"Ai o Tomenaide" (2011)	"Love Me Back" (2011)

Music video
- "Ai o Tomenaide" on YouTube

"Ai o Tomenaide" (愛を止めないで / Don't Stop the Love) is the 51st single by pop/R&B singer/songwriter Koda Kumi. It was released on September 21, 2011 in three separate editions: CD only, CD only [Second Virgin Edition] and CD+DVD. The single peaked at #6 on the Oricon Singles Charts. The "Second Virgin Edition" remained on the charts for fourteen weeks, while the standard edition remained on the charts for eight weeks.

The title track was used as the theme song to the film Second Virgin.

== Background information ==
Ai o Tomenaide (愛を止めないで / Don't Stop the Love) is the fifty-first single by Japanese artist Koda Kumi and was used as the theme song to the film Second Virgin. The single was released in three editions on September 21. The single debuted at #6 on Oricon. The standard editions stayed on the charts for two months, while the "Second Virgin Edition" remained on the charts for fourteen weeks.

Each edition carried a different track list on the CD portion. The "Second Virgin Edition" carried the strings and music box versions of "Anata Dake ga", while the standard editions contained the track "You are not alone," the latter of which garnered a music video on the DVD. The strings version of "Anata Dake ga" was composed by writer and composer Masaki Iehara, who had previously worked with Kumi for her songs "To be one" (2003), "Unmei" (2006), "Aishou" (2007), "Ai no Kotoba" (2009) and "Universe" (2010).

The single was the number one digital single during the weeks of September 14 through September 20, and September 21 through September 27. It was certified platinum for 250,000 downloads in January 2014.

"You are not alone," which was released on the standard edition, was written by Kumi. She described the song to be a "national theme" or "hymn" to represent hope, and a way for her to reach out to her fans and those who were affected by the 2011 Tōhoku earthquake and tsunami.

== Packaging ==
Ai o Tomenaide was released in various editions: CD, CD+DVD and CD [Second Virgin Edition].

There were only two tracks released on the standard CD and CD+DVD editions: "Ai o Tomenaide" and "You are not alone." Neither track received an instrumental or a remix on the single. On the limited editions, there was the making video of "Ai o Tomenaide."

On the "Second Virgin Editions," the track "You are not alone" was omitted and was replaced with two different renditions of "Anata Dake ga" from her single Suki de, Suki de, Suki de. - a strings version composed by Masaki Iehara and a music box version composed by YU.

== Music video ==
The music video for "Ai o Tomenaide" carried a very soft and sensual theme, with much of the imagery being inspired by her 2006 video "Unmei." Much of the camera work and angles closely resembled the prior music video. In the video, Kumi is seen both alone and embraced by a man.

The video for "You are not alone" was compiled of clips from Kumi during a live performance, along with clips of her during rehearsals and in the writing and composing process for the song. The overall theme was to show support to her fans and for every to realize that "no matter the trifles in life, you are not alone."

== Track list ==
CD
No.	Title	Lyrics	Music	Arranger(s)	Length
1.	"Ai o Tomenaide" (愛を止めないで / Don't Stop the Love)	Koda Kumi	Naohisa Taniguchi	Hitoshi Munakata	5:29
2.	"You are not alone"	Koda Kumi	Takuya Harada	Takuya Harada	3:51
Total length:					9:20

DVD
No.	Title	Length
1.	"Ai o Tomenaide" (Music Video)	5:35
2.	"You are not alone" (Music Video)	2:56
3.	"Ai o Tomenaide" (Making Video)

=== Second Virgin Edition ===
CD: Second Virgin Edition
No.	Title	Lyrics	Music	Arranger(s)	Length
1.	"Ai o Tomenaide"	Koda Kumi	Naohisa Taniguchi	Hitoshi Munakata	5:29
2.	"Anata Dake ga" (Strings Version)	Koda Kumi	MARKIE • SiZK from ★STAR GUiTAR	Masaki Iehara	4:45
3.	"Anata Dake ga" (Music Box Version)		YU	YU	3:48
Total length:					13:22

*Making video of "Ai o Tomenaide" only available on limited editions

== Charts ==
=== Oricon sales chart ===
Release	Chart	Peak position	First day/week sales
September 21, 2011	Oricon Daily Chart	5	
September 21, 2011	Oricon Weekly Chart	6	30,828
September 21, 2011	Oricon Monthly Chart	19	43,969
September 21, 2011	Oricon Yearly Chart	177	

All figures pertain to "Ai o Tomenaide" or the single as a whole, unless stated.

Chart (2011)	Peak position
Chaku-Uta Full (Digital Single) Monthly top 100	3
Chaku-Uta (Ringtone) Monthly top 100	1
Chaku-Uta Music Video Monthly top 100	3
RIAJ Digital Track Chart weekly top 100	1
Recochoku 2011 most downloaded full songs overall	45
Most downloaded chaku uta 2011	49
Most downloaded melody call/RBT 2011	9
Most downloaded full Videoclips 2011	42
Most downloaded Chaku movies 2011	38

== Certifications ==
Chart	Number
RIAJ downloads	Platinum (250,000+)

== Alternate versions ==
Ai o Tomenaide

1. "Ai o Tomenaide": found on the single (2011) and corresponding album Japonesque (2012)
2. "Ai o Tomenaide" [World Sketch Remix]: found on Koda Kumi Driving Hit's 4 (2012)

You are not alone

1. "You are not alone": found on the single (2011)
2. "You are not alone" [acoustic version]: found on Japonesque (2012)
