= 4 Times =

Single by Koda Kumi

from the album Japonesque
- Released: August 17, 2011
- Recorded: 2011
- Genre: J-pop; R&B; dance-pop; pop rock
- Label: Rhythm Zone
- Songwriter: Koda Kumi

Koda Kumi singles chronology
"Pop Diva" (2011)	"4 Times" (2011)	"Ai o Tomenaide" (2011)

"4 Times" (stylized as "4 TIMES") is the 50th single by pop/R&B singer Koda Kumi. It was released on August 17, 2011 and debuted at No. 6, remaining on the Oricon charts for nine consecutive weeks. In commemoration of it being the fiftieth single since her debut, the single contained four A-sides, making it her first since 4 Hot Wave (2006).

The single came in four editions: CD, CD+DVD, CD+QLIX Digital Camera and CD+50 Postcards BOX Set. The latter two only carried the song "Poppin' love cocktail featuring TEEDA."

== Information ==
4 Times is a single by Japanese singer-songwriter Koda Kumi under the Avex sub-label Rhythm Zone, and was a limited release done to celebrate her 50th single. The single charted at No. 6 on the Oricon Singles Charts and stayed on the charts for over two months. The single's name came from the single being a quadruple a-side, something which she had not done since her 2006 single 4 Hot Wave.

The main track from the single, "V.I.P," contained a short sample of American group Fort Minor's song "Believe Me". "KO-SO-KO-SO" was the more erotic song on the single, in both lyrics and video. The track was a sensual song with elements both in R&B and pop. The videos for the two songs intertwined with the end of "V.I.P" leading into the opening of "KO-SO-KO-SO." "In The Air" (stylized as IN THE AIR) was a more light-hearted pop song, with romantic lyrics, as opposed to sensual. The song was composed by Swedish songwriter and music producer Erik Lidbom, who had also worked with the likes of Ayumi Hamasaki and Namie Amuro.

The song "Poppin' love cocktail" featured Tokyo-based rock band Back-On with only rapper TEEDA performing vocals alongside Kumi. The group collaborated with Kumi upon her request. After noting their work with her younger sister misono, Kumi approached the group and asked if they would help her compose a summer song that was different than her past songs "girls" and "Lady Go!."

Although 4 Times was a quadruple a-side like 4 hot wave, not all of the music videos were intertwined. Instead, only two of the videos were connected: "V.I.P" and "KO-SO-KO-SO." The other two videos, "In The Air" and "Poppin' love cocktail," were stand-alone. Prior to its release, it was said the music video for "KO-SO-KO-SO" would be Koda Kumi's first video to be banned from airing on television broadcasting stations, whereas the video was promoted as being her "most sexual PV." However, upon its release, while the video was not banned, it could only be played after 22:00.

A short audio teaser of "KO-SO-KO-SO" was leaked online on June 28, 2011 and the full song premiered on July 10. The making videos were uploaded to Avex's YouTube as a way to assist in promoting the single prior to its release. The music video for "V.I.P" was released August first and the rest of the videos were released on the thirteenth.

"Poppin' love cocktail" was the only song on the single to be certified gold for 100,000 downloads, as of January 2014.

== Packaging ==
To help celebrate her fiftieth single, 4 Times was released in two promotional editions along with its standard CD and CD+DVD editions.

The CD and CD+DVD editions contained all four tracks with interludes and the four music videos corresponding to the a-sides. The CD+Qlix Digital Camera and CD+50 Postcards Box Set editions only came with "Poppin' love cocktail" on the CD. The Qlix digital camera contained a unique cover design, with red polka dots on a black background, along with "Koda Kumi Summer 2011" written in white. The fifty postcards included in the box set were promotional photos from all fifty singles she had released up to 4 Times.

== Music videos ==
Unlike 4 Hot Wave, only two of the four music videos are interconnected: "V.I.P" and "KO-SO-KO-SO."

"V.I.P" centers around Kumi going to a night club and pursued by two male suitors; however, while she flirts with them, she fails to be interested. At the end of the video, she sends them away and is approached by a young woman. The lead into "KO-SO-KO-SO" shows Kumi with the same woman, simulating sexual acts in a dimly lit bedroom. Due to the promiscuity in the video, it was rumored that it would be her first music video to be banned from being aired on television stations in Japan. These rumors ultimately turned out to be untrue.

"Poppin' love cocktail" features TEEDA from Back-On and is an upbeat rock track. Kumi said how, after hearing and seeing her younger sister, misono, work with the band, she enjoyed their musical style and asked them for help to write a new summer song that was different than her previous popular summer tracks. The music video features both her and TEEDA constantly fighting to be the center of attention and sabotaging each other's attempts at the limelight.

The video for "In The Air" was very simplistic, showing Koda Kumi on a couch while being bathed in sunlight as she fawns over a crush.

Kumi said the four songs were to show "one summer day.".

== Track listing ==
(iTunes)

CD
No.	Title	Lyrics	Music	Arranger(s)	Length
1.	"Introduction ~Sunny Time~"		UTA		0:41
2.	"Poppin' love cocktail" (featuring TEEDA)	Koda Kumi; TEEDA	Back-On	Back-On; Jin	5:00
3.	"Interlude ~Sunset Time~"		UTA		0:37
4.	"In the Air"	Koda Kumi	Erik Lidbom; Fast Lane	Erik Lidbom	4:08
5.	"Interlude ~Midnight Time~"		UTA		0:28
6.	"V.I.P."	Koda Kumi • Toby Gad • Jessie J	Koda Kumi • Toby Gad • Jessie J	Toby Gad	3:05
7.	"Interlude ~time to...love~"		UTA		0:36
8.	"KO-SO-KO-SO"	Koda Kumi • Allan P. Grigg • Kenichi Takemoto	Koda Kumi • Allan P. Grigg • Kenichi Takemoto		3:19
Total length:					17:52

DVD: Music Video
No.	Title	Length
1.	"Poppin' love cocktail featuring TEEDA" (Music video)
2.	"V.I.P." (Music video)
3.	"KO-SO-KO-SO" (Music video)
4.	"In the Air" (Music video)

CD+QLIX Digital Camera / CD+50 Postcard BOX Set
No.	Title	Lyrics	Music	Arranger(s)	Length
1.	"Poppin' love cocktail" (featuring TEEDA)	Kumi Koda; TEEDA	BACK-ON	BACK-ON; Jin	5:00

== Charts ==
=== Oricon sales chart ===
Release	Chart	Peak position	First day/week sales	Sales total
August 17, 2011	Oricon Daily Chart	4	28,789	
August 17, 2011	Oricon Weekly Chart	6	54,773	74,300
August 17, 2011	Oricon Monthly Chart	12	64,310	
August 17, 2011	Oricon Yearly Chart	102		

== Alternate versions ==
Poppin' love cocktail feat. TEEDA

1. "Poppin' love cocktail" featuring TEEDA: released on the single (2011) and corresponding album Japonesque (2012)
2. "Poppin' love cocktail" featuring TEEDA [TeddyLoid Remix]: found on Koda Kumi Driving Hit's 4 (2012) and Koda Kumi Driving Hit's 5 (2013)

V.I.P

1. "V.I.P": found on the single (2011)
2. "V.I.P" featuring T-Pain: found on Japonesque (2012)
3. "V.I.P" featuring T-PAIN [Sunset in Ibiza Remix]: found on Beach Mix (2012)

KO-SO-KO-SO

1. "KO-SO-KO-SO": found on the single (2011) and corresponding album Japonesque (2012)
2. "KO-SO-KO-SO" [Prog5 Remix]: found on Beach Mix (2012)
