= Back-On =

Japanese rock band

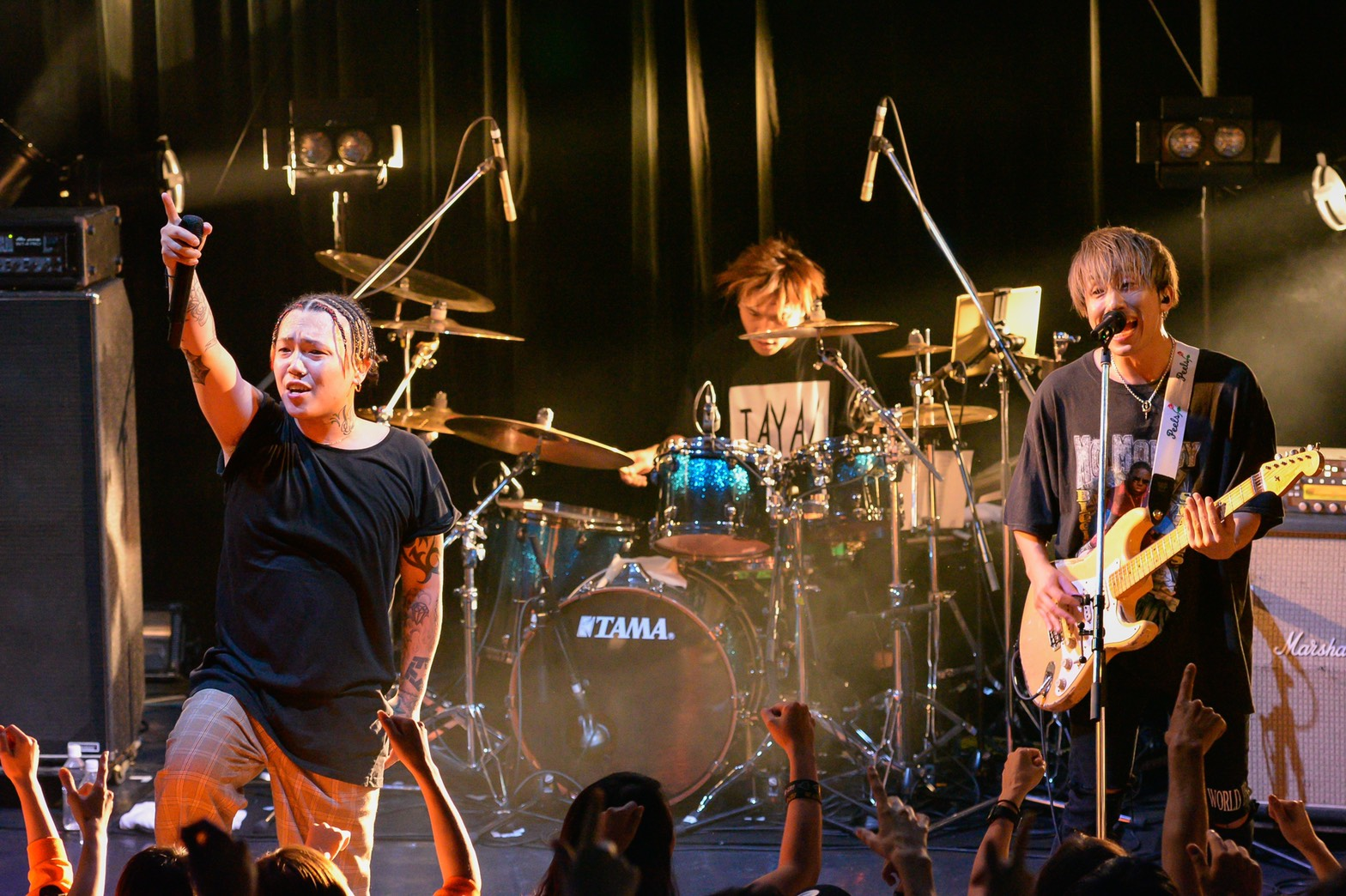

Background information
- Origin: Tokyo, Japan
- Genres: Rock; hard rock; synth-pop; hip hop; rap rock
- Years active: 2002–present
- Labels: Cutting Edge, JPU Records
- Spinoffs: BAReeeeeeeeeeN
- Members: Kenji03; Teeda
- Past members: Shu; Gori; Macchin; Icchan
- Website: Official website

Back-On (stylized as BACK-ON) is a Japanese rock band from Tokyo, Japan. They are known for performing opening themes to anime and games, such as the Tales of the World: Radiant Mythology 2 opening theme, "fly away"; the Air Gear opening theme, "Chain"; the Murder Princess opening theme "Hikari Sasuhou (fk Metal ver.)", and the Eyeshield 21 opening theme "Blaze Line". They have also written ending themes for both anime and TV shows, including "flower" and "a day dreaming..." for Eyeshield 21, "Butterfly" for the late-night TV drama Shinjuku Swan, "Sands of Time" for the mobile robot TV drama Keitai Sousakan 7, and "Strike Back" for the anime series Fairy Tail.

== History ==
Kenji03 and Gori have been friends since childhood, having attended the same school in Adachi, Tokyo. In their sixth year in school, they realized that they wanted to start a band, though in the beginning they did it all separately. While in high school, Kenji03 met Teeda while Gori met Shu. They each started out in separate bands, but eventually ended up uniting with each other to form their own band. Shortly after their formulation, Kenji03 met his brother's friend Macchin, who joined the band as its drummer and rounded out the quintet.

Back-On made their first international appearance at Anime Matsuri on April 28, 2007, in Houston, Texas and were invited back for Anime Matsuri 2010. Since then they've also appeared in Vancouver, Canada for Anime Evolution in August 2007, and Anime USA in Arlington, Virginia in November 2007. They were also the guest judges for Anime Idol 2007 at Anime Evolution.

They formed a new band called BAReeeeeeeeeeN with the 4-man band GReeeeN, and their debut single "Ashiato" was released on October 1, 2008. The song reached No. 1 in the USEN and chaku-uta digital download charts.

The band's singles "Flyaway" and "Where Is the Future?" were created as theme music for the PSP game Tales of the World: Radiant Mythology 2, which was released exclusively in Japan on January 28, 2009.

Back-On performed at Connichi 2009 in Kassel, Germany in 2009, and revisited Taiwan for two live performances in December 2009.

Their single One Step!/Tomorrow Never Knows was released on January 27, 2010; "Tomorrow never knows" was used as the background theme music for a DyDo coffee commercial featuring Japanese surfer Teppei Tajima.

In 2013/14, the band composed and performed two opening themes for the anime series Gundam Build Fighters, called "Nibun no Ichi" (ニブンノイチ; "One Half") and "wimp ft. Lil' Fang (from FAKY)"; the latter features vocals by Lil' Fang from the group FAKY and aired from episode 14 onwards. Both singles were released in three versions: CD-only, CD+DVD (with videos) and CD+gunpla plastic model.

They were invited back to perform at Anime USA in 2013 after a 6-year break from the US and were also star guests at Pacific Media Expo shortly after.

The band performed at Anime Friends in 2014 as their first visit to Brazil.

In 2015, their song "Resurrection" was used as the ending theme for Initial D Legend 2: Racer movie.

Back-On also performed as a headliner at Otakon Matsuri in 2015.

On May 26, 2017, the band celebrated its 15th anniversary with a concert at Ebisu Liquidroom titled "BACK-ON 15th Anniversary Live -Ultimate Thanks-". Gori and Shu quit the band after this show, leaving Back-On as the duo of Kenji03 and Teeda.

In 2023, it was revealed that they would be performing the opening theme for Kamen Rider Gotchard, titled "CHEMY×STORY". Along with Flow they would sing a new version of the opening for the episodes airing in 2024, along with Chinese and English self-covers.

== Members ==
=== Current ===
- Kenji03 – Vocal & Guitar (2002–present)
- Teeda – MC (2002–present)

=== Former ===
- Macchin – Drums (2002–2006)
- Icchan – Drums (2006–2011)
- Gori – Bass Guitar (2002–2017)
- Shu – Guitar (2002–2017)

== Discography ==
=== Singles ===
Single	Title	Tracks	Release date
1st	"Chain"	1. "Chain"; 2. "Believer"; 3. "Kodou" (鼓動; "Pulse")	June 7, 2006
2nd	"Blaze Line/A Day Dreaming..."	1. "Blaze Line"; 2. "A Day Dreaming..."; 3. "Eyes"; 4. "Blaze Line" (TV size); 5. "A Day Dreaming..." (TV size)	June 6, 2007
3rd	"Butterfly"	1. "Butterfly"; 2. "Spark"; 3. "Drive" (Shutokou Remix) (Drive (首都高 Remix))	September 19, 2007
4th	"Flower"	1. "Flower"; 2. "Zero"; 3. "Colors"	September 19, 2007
5th	"Sands of Time"	1. "Sands of Time"; 2. "Message for Kidz"; 3. "Fifty/50"	May 21, 2008
6th	"Flyaway"	1. "Flyaway"; 2. "Where Is the Future?"; 3. "Re:Start"; 4. "Flyaway" ("Tales of" Remix) (limited edition CD only)	January 28, 2009
7th	"One Step! feat. Mini/Tomorrow Never Knows"	1. "One Step! feat. Mini"; 2. "Tomorrow Never Knows"	January 27, 2010
8th	"Tell Me"	1. "Tell Me"; 2. "Discovery"	January 19, 2011
9th	"With You Feat. Me"	1. "With You Feat. Me (Misono)"; 2. Nagareboshi (流れ星; "Shooting Star"); 3. "With You" ("Tales of" Remix) (limited edition CD only)	February 9, 2011
10th	"Connectus and selfish"	1. Connectus and selfish 2. "flyaway" 3. "We are...." 4. "Ashiato (BareeeeeeeeeeN)"	August 17, 2011
11th	"Ice cream"	1. "Ice cream" 2. "Piece"	May 9, 2012
12th	"ニブンノイチ / INFINITY"	1. "Nibun no Ichi" (ニブンノイチ; "One Half"); 2. "INFINITY"; 3. "ニブンノイチ～instrumental～" 4. "INFINITY～instrumental～"	November 6, 2013
13th	"wimp ft. Lil' Fang (from FAKY)"	1. "wimp ft. Lil' Fang (from FAKY)"; 2. "Traumatic"; 3. "Around the world" ** (not available in CD+GOODS ver.); 4. "wimp" 5. "wimp ft. Lil' Fang (from FAKY)～instrumental～"; 6. "Traumatic ～instrumental～"	March 12, 2014
14th	"Departure / STRIKEBACK"	1. "Departure"; 2. "STRIKEBACK"; 3. "Departure (日本工学院Ver.)"; 4. "Departure ～instrumental～" 5. "STRIKEBACK ～instrumental～"	July 30, 2014
15th	"セルリアン / Silent Trigger"	1. "Cerulean" (セルリアン); 2. "Silent Trigger"; 3. "セルリアン ～instrumental～" 4. "Silent Trigger ～instrumental～"	December 17, 2014
16th	"DTM EP"	1. "DTM"; 2. "AMANOJAKU"; 3. "DISLIKE"	October 30, 2015

=== Mini-albums ===
Album	Title	Tracks	Release date
1st	Adachi Tribe	1. Intro feat. DJ Takaki; 2. Over; 3. Dreamer; 4. Forward; 5. Sono Mama De (そのままで; "As Is"); 6. Ultimate Adachi (アルティメット足立, Arutimetto Adachi)	October 27, 2004
2nd	Hero	1. Flydom; 2. Nuts Tribe; 3. Ultimate Adachi (アルティメット足立, Arutimetto Adachi); 4. Over (Leave It Alone Mix); 5. Soul Shout (Studio Live)	July 13, 2005 (Out of Print)
3rd	Baby Rock	1. Gaku-Ten; 2. Blow; 3. Flydom; 4. Forward; 5. Feel; 6. Nuts Tribe; 7. Lucky (ラッキー, Rakkī); 8. So Many Tears	October 19, 2005
4th	New World	1. New World; 2. Chain (Album Mix); 3. Rain; 4. Hikari Sasuhou (ヒカリサスホウ); 5. Drive; 6. Make Some Noise	November 22, 2006
5th	DTM EP	1. DTM; 2. Amanojaku; 3. Dislike	October 30, 2015
6th	New Era	1. Clown; 2. Carry On; 3. Laugh Now; 4. Misty Rain; 5. Knock Knock	February 21, 2018
7th	Chop Kick Turn	1. Wild Thing; 2. Wannabe; 3. Kuroiro Shōshi ~Clown~ (黑色小丑 ~Clown~); 4. Carry On (Musō ~Carry On~ (Carry on (夢想 ~Carry on~))	March 6, 2019
8th	Rebirth	1. Good Morning; 2. Switch; 3. Rebirth; 4. Three Two One; 5. Tokyo Be-bop; 6. Shall We Dance; 7. Chain 2020	January 22, 2020

=== Full albums ===
Album	Title	Tracks	Release date
1st	Yes!!!	1. Hatenaki Michi e (果てなき道へ; "To the Endless Road") [LA mix]; 2. Flower [LA mix]; 3. New World; 4. Sands of Time; 5. Butterfly; 6. Blaze Line; 7. Drive; 8. A Day Dreaming...; 9. Sono Mama De (そのままで; "As it is") [New Ver.]; 10. Hikari Sasuhou (ヒカリサスホウ) [New World Ver.]; 11. Chain [LA mix]; 12. Flydom; 13. BAReeeeeeeeeeN / Color [LA mix] (bonus track); 14. BAReeeeeeeeeeN / Ashiato (足跡; "Footprint") [LA mix] (bonus track)	November 12, 2008
2nd	Hello World	1. Beginning; 2. Rockstar Anthem; 3. With You feat. Me; 4. Apologize; 5. Twenty Four / 7; 6. Tell Me; 7. Flyaway; 8. Hero; 9. Tomorrow Never Knows -album ver.-; 10. We Are...; 11. One Step! feat. mini 12. Hare Days	February 16, 2011
3rd	Good Job!!	1. Ice cream 2. Highway Dancer; 3. Connectus; 4. Gimme! Gimme! Gimme!; 5. come on & Let's go feat.Emyli, kailis from OVER DOSE (Taiwan); 6. HOME; 7. Word play 8. WE CAN'T STOP; 9. Futari Diary (フタリダイアリー, Futari Daiarī; "Two Diaries"); 10. IT'S NOT OVER; 11. Selfish; 12. Mr Yesterday	May 30, 2012
4th	Reload	1. ニブンノイチ; 2. STRIKE BACK; 3. INFINITY; 4. wimp ft. Lil' Fang (from FAKY); 5. Life rolls on 6. RELOAD; 7. イマジニ ft. Duran (from Made in Asia); 8. READY SET GO!; 9. Around the world 10. BUZZ BOY; 11. Milky way 12. Departure	October 1, 2014
5th	PACK OF THE FUTURE	1. PACK OF THE FUTURE; 2. セルリアン; 3. Fame; 4. DISLIKE; 5. マーマレード; 6. What a beautiful day 7. AMANOJAKU; 8. DTM; 9. Mirrors ※1/7より先行配信中！; 10. Silent Trigger; 11. リザレクション; 12. Dear Me; 13. Parade for the hope	March 2, 2016
6th	Still B/O	1. Stay Real; 2. Beyond sadness 3. WAVES; 4. Down; 5. Kill the Beat feat. Jesse; 6. Loser; 7. Still in my heart 8. Bring the Noise; 9. NEVER FREEZE feat. MICRO; 10. SKY WALKER	November 10, 2021

== Songs used in media ==
- Air Gear Opening Theme: "Chain"
- Murder Princess Opening Theme: "Hikari Sasuhou (FK Metal ver.)" (ヒカリサスホウ (FK Metal ver.))
- Eyeshield 21 4th Opening Theme: "Blaze Line"
- Eyeshield 21 5th Closing Theme: "A Day Dreaming..."
- Eyeshield 21 6th Closing Theme: "Flower"
- Tokyo Mayokara 1st Theme: "Kodou" (鼓動; "Pulse")
- Tokyo Mayokara 2nd Theme: "Colors"
- Shinjuku Swan Ending Theme: "Butterfly"
- K-tai Investigator 7 Ending Theme: "Sands of Time"
- Tales of the World: Radiant Mythology 2 Opening Theme: "Flyaway"
- Tales of the World: Radiant Mythology 2 Ending Theme: "Where Is the Future?"
- IAMS Japan's 2009 animal shelter series Theme: "We Are..."
- DyDo coffee TV CM Theme: "Tomorrow Never Knows"
- Tales of the World: Radiant Mythology 3 Opening Theme: "With You feat. Me (Misono Koda)"
- Tales of the World: Radiant Mythology 3 Ending Theme:"Nagareboshi" (流れ星; "Shooting Star")
- Gundam Breaker Opening Theme: "Infinity"
- Gundam Build Fighters Opening Theme: "ニブンノイチ -One Half-"
- Gundam Build Fighters Opening Theme: "wimp ft. Lil' Fang (from FAKY)"
- Fairy Tail 16th Opening Theme: "Strike Back"
- Gundam Build Fighters Try Opening Theme: "Cerulean"
- Gundam Build Fighters Try: Island Wars Opening Theme: "The Last One"
- Gundam Breaker 2 Opening Theme: "Silent Trigger"
- Initial D Legend 2: Racer Closing Theme: "リザレクション"
- Gundam Breaker 3 Opening Theme: "Mirrors"
- Gundam Build Fighters: GM's Counterattack Opening Theme: "Carry on"
- Kamen Rider Geats Insert Song: "Chair"
- Gundam Build Metaverse Opening Theme: "Hikari to Kaze" (ヒカリトカゼ; "Light and Wind")
- Kamen Rider Gotchard Opening Theme: "CHEMY×STORY"
- Kamen Rider Gotchard Insert Song: "THE SKY'S THE LIMIT" (w/ Beverly)
- Kamen Rider Gotchard: The Future Daybreak Ending Theme: THE FUTURE DAYBREAK (w/ Flow)
- Kamen Rider Gotchard: Graduations Ending Theme: "GRADUATIONS"
- Langrisser Mobile 7th Anniversary Opening Theme: "RERISE"
- Kamen Rider ZEZTZ Insert Song: "Kickstart"

== Videography ==
=== PV ===
- Flydom (Hero)
- Nuts Tribe (Hero)
- Gaku-Ten (Baby Rock)
- Kodou (鼓動; "Pulse") (Chain)
- Chain (Chain)
- New World (New World)
- A Day Dreaming... (Blaze Line/A Day Dreaming...)
- Blaze Line (Blaze Line/A Day Dreaming...)
- Flower (Flower)
- Butterfly (Butterfly)
- Sands of Time (YES!!!)
- Flyaway (YES!!!)
- One Step! (Hello World)
- Tell Me (Hello World)
- With You (Hello World)
- Ice cream (Good Job!!)
- ニブンノイチ (ニブンノイチ / INFINITY)
- wimp ft. Lil' Fang (from FAKY) (wimp ft. Lil' Fang (from FAKY))
