= Koda Kumi videography =

Koda Kumi video discography
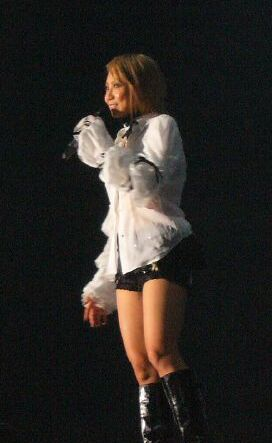
- Koda Kumi performing at Live Earth in Tokyo in 2007.
- Video albums: 18
- Music videos: 139
- Films: 3

Koda Kumi has released more than 170 music videos since her debut in 2000. In other visual media, she has made four cameos: one in the Square Enix video game Final Fantasy X-2 as the character Lenne, one in the 2004 film Cutie Honey singing "The Theme of Sister Jill," one in the 2006 drama Busu no Hitomi ni Koishiteru, and one in the 2011 re-make of the Korean drama You're Beautiful, Ikemen desu ne. Kumi starred in the film Cherry Girl in 2006, a 52-minute movie filmed for her 2006 album, Black Cherry. She also acted in the 2007 film Saiyūki, the feature film version of the 2006 drama Saiyūki.

For her music videos, Kumi has actively worked with directors Shigeaki Kubo and Takashi Tadokoro, with both directing more than 15 of her videos each. From 2009, Kumi increasingly worked with directors Ryuji Seki and Hiroaki Higashi. Kumi has also worked multiple times with directors Tomoo Noda, Tetsuo Inoue and Ippei Morita. For her 2008 collaboration with Fergie, "That Ain't Cool," Kumi worked with American music video director Fatima Robinson. She enlisted the help of Robinson once more for the videos on her 2012 single Summer Trip, "Touch Down" and "LALALALALA." For the video of her cover of hide's "Pink Spider," Kumi worked with Japanese director Mika Ninagawa.

== Music videos ==
=== 2000s ===
Year	Music video	Director(s)	Notes
2000	"Take Back"	Masashi Mutō	
2002	"Trust Your Love"	Ken Sueda	
2002	"Color of Soul"	Toru Morimoto, Yuki Saito	
2002	"So into You"	Takashi Tadokoro	
2002	"Love Across the Ocean"	Masaki Shinozuka	
2002	"Maze"	Tetsuo Inoue	
2003	"Real Emotion"	Inoue	
2003	"Come with Me"	Takahide "Taka" Ishii	
2003	"Gentle Words"	Tadokoro	
2004	"Crazy 4 U"	Inoue	
2004	"Switch"	Shigeaki Kubo	Lisa featuring Kumi Koda and Heartsdales
2004	"Cutie Honey" (キューティーハニー, Kyūtī Hanī)	Inoue	
2004	"Chase"	Hidaki Sunaga	
2004	"Kiseki"	Tadokoro	
2004	"Selfish"	Ippei Morita	Compiled on Girls: Selfish
2004	"Shake It"	Ishii, Yūsuke Azumaya	Compiled on Girls: Selfish
2004	"24"	Morita	Compiled on Girls: Selfish
2005	"Hands"	Morita	
2005	"Hands (Album Edition)"	Morita	
2005	"Trust You"	Kubo	
2005	"Just Go"	Masaki Ōkita	Jhett featuring Kumi Koda
2005	"Hot Stuff" (featuring KM-Markit)	Kubo	
2005	"Trust You" (Thanks to Mam & Gramma Ver.)	Kubo	Re-cut edition featuring fewer dance scenes and more kimono scenes.
2005	"Butterfly"	Kubo	
2005	"Promise"	Tadokoro	
2005	"Star"	Tadokoro	Billed the "Short Version," but no full-length version exists.
2005	"You"	Kubo	
2005	"Birthday Eve"	Sunaga	
2005	"DDD" (featuring Soulhead)	Ryuji Seki	
2005	"Shake It Up"	Tadokoro	
2006	"Lies"	Kubo	
2006	"Feel"	Kubo	
2006	"Candy" (featuring Mr. Blistah)	Kubo	
2006	"No Regret"	Mutō, Hidetaka Tahara	
2006	"Ima Sugu Hoshii"	Shūichi Tan	
2006	"XXX"	Seki	Soulhead featuring Kumi Koda
2006	"Kamen" (featuring Tatsuya Ishii)	Hiroaki Hobo	
2006	"Wind"	Kubo	
2006	"Someday"	Kubo	
2006	"Koi no Tsubomi"	Seki	
2006	"Ningyo-hime" (人魚姫; "Mermaid Princess")	Tadokoro	
2006	"I'll Be There"	Kubo	
2006	"Juicy"	Kubo	
2006	"With Your Smile"	Kubo	
2006	"Yume no Uta"	Kensuke Kawamura	
2006	"Futari de..."	Kawamura	
2006	"Won't Be Long" (Exile & Kumi Koda)	Ishii	
2006	"Unmei"	Tomoo Noda	
2006	"Twinkle"	Yasuhiro Aoki	Animated feature by Studio 4°C for their short film Amazing Nuts!: Tatoe Kimi ga Sekaijū no Teki ni Natte mo
2006	"Twinkle (English Version)" (Show Lo featuring Kumi Koda)	Electronik	
2007	"Get Up & Move!!"	Kawamura	
2007	"Crazy 4 U" (Dance Version)	Inoue	Re-cut dance versions for Best: Bounce & Lovers
2007	"Juicy" (Dance Version)	Kubo	Re-cut dance versions for Best: Bounce & Lovers
2007	"So into You" (Dance Version)	Tadokoro	Re-cut dance versions for Best: Bounce & Lovers
2007	"Selfish" (Dance Version)	Morita	Re-cut dance versions for Best: Bounce & Lovers
2007	"Candy" (Dance Version) (featuring Mr. Blistah)	Kubo	Re-cut dance versions for Best: Bounce & Lovers
2007	"Hot Stuff" (Dance Version) (featuring KM-Markit)	Kubo	Re-cut dance versions for Best: Bounce & Lovers
2007	"But"	Tadokoro	
2007	"Aisho"	Noda	
2007	"Freaky"	Tadokoro	
2007	"Run for Your Life"	Kubo	
2007	"Ai no Uta"	Noda	
2007	"Last Angel" (featuring Tohoshinki)	Morita	
2008	"Anytime"	Kubo	
2008	"Introduction for Kingdom"	Yoshiya Okoyama	Animated feature created by Yoshiya Okoyama of animation team Drawiz, Inc.
2008	"Anytime (Album Version)"	Kubo	Re-cut with singing scenes removed.
2008	"Under"	Hirotaka Takada	
2008	"Koi no Mahō" (恋の魔法; "Magic of Love")	Tadokoro	
2008	"Himitsu" (秘密; "Secret")	Tadokoro	
2008	"Ai no Uta" (Album Version)	Noda	Re-cut with monochrome scenes.
2008	"More"	Yoshiya Okoyama	
2008	"Amai Wana" (甘い罠; "Sweet Snare")	Tadokoro	
2008	"Anata ga Shite Kureta Koto" (あなたがしてくれたこと; "The Things You Did for Me")	Tadokoro	
2008	"Wonderland"	Natsuki Kida	
2008	"Moon Crying"	Tadokoro	
2008	"That Ain't Cool"(featuring Fergie)	Fatima Robinson	Features an appearance of Fergie herself.
2008	"Taboo"	Tadokoro	
2008	"Taboo" (Another Edition)	Tadokoro	Re-cut to centre around bathroom dance scenes.
2008	"Stay with Me"	Tadokoro	
2008	"Stay with Me" (Another Edition)	Tadokoro	Re-cut to centre on song performance scenes.
2009	"Show Girl"	Kubo	
2009	"Just the Way You Are"	Seki	
2009	"That Ain't Cool" (Album Edition)(featuring Fergie)	Robinson	Re-cut with additional scenes.
2009	"It's All Love!" (Kumi Koda x Misono)	Tadokoro	
2009	"Faraway"	Hirotaka Takada	
2009	"Lick Me"	Kubo	
2009	"Ecstasy"	Inoue	
2009	"Hashire!" (走れ!; "Run!")	Seki	
2009	"Alive"	Noda	
2009	"Physical Thing"	Seki	

=== 2010s ===
Year	Music video	Director(s)	Notes
2010	"Can We Go Back"	Ryuji Seki	
2010	"SUPERSTAR"	Hiroaki Higashi	
2010	"You're So Beautiful"	Takashi Tadokoro	
2010	"Lollipop"	Ryuji Seki	
2010	"Inside Fishbowl"	Hiroaki Higashi	
2010	"Outside Fishbowl"	Takashi Tadokoro	
2010	"Suki de, Suki de, Suki de."	Tomoda Noda	
2010	"Anata Dake ga"	Tomoda Noda	
2010	"Walk (To the Future)"	Tomoda Noda	
2010	"Megumi no Hito" (め組のひと; "Group 'Eye' People")	Hiroaki Higashi	
2010	"Be My Baby"	Hiroaki Higashi	
2011	"POP DIVA" (Album Version)	Ryuji Seki	Features added sound effects
2011	"Bambi"	Hiroaki Higashi	
2011	"Passing By" (featuring B. Howard)	Hiroaki Higashi	Features an appearance by B. Howard himself.
2011	"VIP"	Hiroaki Higashi	
2011	"Poppin' Love Cocktail" (featuring Teeda)	Hiroaki Higashi	
2011	"Ko-So-Ko-So"	Hiroaki Higashi	
2011	"In the Air"	Ryuji Seki	
2011	"Ai o Tomenaide"	Ryuji Seki	
2011	"You Are Not Alone"	Kunihiko Okazaki	Features live rehearsal footage.
2011	"Love Me Back"	Hiroaki Higashi	
2012	"Boom Boom Boys"	Ryuji Seki	
2012	"No Man's Land"	Ryuji Seki	
2012	"VIP" (featuring T-Pain)	Hiroaki Higashi	Does not feature T-Pain in the music video.
2012	"Lay Down"	Yu-ya HARA	
2012	"ESCALATE"	Ryuji Seki	
2012	"Love Me Back (Album Version)"	Hiroaki Higashi	
2012	"So Nice" (featuring Mr. Blistah)	Hiroaki Higashi	
2012	"Slow" (featuring Omarion)	Hiroaki Higashi	Features an appearance by Omarion himself.
2012	"Everyday"	Hiroaki Higashi	
2012	"Love Technique"	Ryuji Seki	
2012	"Brave"	Yu-ya HARA	
2012	"All for You"	Yu-ya HARA	
2012	"Brave (Love Romance Version)"		
2012	"Whatchu Waitin' On?"	Hiroaki Higashi	
2012	"Go to the Top"	Tomoe Nakano	Animated music video.
2012	"Koishikute"	Ryuji Seki	
2013	"Lovely" (ラブリー, Raburii)	Ryuji Seki	
2013	"Pink Spider"	Mika Ninagawa	
2013	"Shake Hip!"	Ryuji Seki	
2013	"Pink Spider (UULA Version)"	Mika Ninagawa	
2013	"TOUCH DOWN"	Fatima Robinson	
2013	"LALALALALA"	Fatima Robinson	
2013	"Dreaming Now!"	Ryuji Seki	
2014	"SHOW ME YOUR HOLLA"	Ryuji Seki	
2014	"LOL"		
2014	"HOTEL"	Kanji Sudo	
2014	"Money in My Bag"		
2014	"So Fever"		
2014	"Kimi Omoi"		
2014	"Never Give It Up"		
2014	"Dance in the Rain"	YKBX	
2015	"WALK OF MY LIFE"	YKBX	
2015	"Like It"		
2015	"EX TAPE"	YKBX	
2015	"Hurricane"		
2016	"On And On"		
2016	"On And On (Selfie Version)"		
2016	"No Me Without You"		
2017	"Ultraviolet"	Xiao Zhang Taiyang	
2017	"Insane"		
2017	"Bassline"		
2017	"Wicked Girls"		
2017	"BRIDGET SONG"	Xiao Zhang Taiyang	
2017	"Promise You"		
2018	"Never Enough"		
2018	"LIT"	Shuhei Shibue	
2018	"LIT -Dance Version-"		
2018	"Never Enough -Special Version-"		
2018	"PARTY"	MAIKO / Yuki Tsujimoto	
2018	"HUSH"		
2018	"Watch Out!! ~DNA~"		
2018	"HAIRCUT"	YKBX	
2018	"Chances All"		
2019	"Livin' La Vida Loca"		
2019	"GOLDFINGER 2019"	Kanji Sudo	
2019	"STRIP -otona no tsuchi dora 'Rika'"	Ryuji Seki	
2019	"GET NAKED"	Ryuji Seki	
2019	"again"	Ryuji Seki	
2019	"k,"	Ryuji Seki	
2019	"k,-dance version-"		

=== 2020s ===
Year	Music video	Director(s)	Notes
2020	"puff ~Youtube ver.~"	Seiya Ito	
2020	"puff ~Dance ver.~"		
2020	"XXKK"	Ryuji Seki	
2020	"RUN"	Ryuji Seki	
2020	"Suki de, Suki de, Suki de. -Urusei Yatsura Collaboration Version- "		
2020	"Killer MonsteR"	Ryuji Seki	
2020	"Killer monsteR -Dance Ver.-"		
2021	"Lucky Star"		
2021	"Lucky Star -Tour Edition-"		
2021	"Dreaming Now!! -Tour Edition-"		
2021	"We’ll Be OK"		
2021	"Doo-Bee-Doo-Bop"		
2021	"to be free"		
2021	"4 MORE"		
2021	"4 MORE -Dance Ver.-"		
2021	"100 no Kodoku-tachi e"	Ryuji Seki	
2022	"Sure shot"	Toshiyuki Suzuki	
2023	"Wings"		
2023	"Trigger"		
2023	"BLACK WINGS"		
2023	"Tōi Machi no Doko ka de..."		
2024	"Vroom"		
2024	"Silence"		
2024	"Jump to the Breeze" (with Tetsuya Komuro)		
2025	"ChaO!"		

== Video albums ==
=== Compilation albums ===
List of media, with selected chart positions
Title	Album details	Peak positions		Certifications
Title	Album details	JPN	TWN (Note: Week references:Secret First Class 2005年 第40週, First Things 2006年 第41週, Black Cherry 2008年 第19週, Kingdom 2008年 第44週, Taiwan Live 2010年 第12週, Fantasia 2011年 第22週, Dejavu 2012年 第8週, Love & Songs 2013年 第13週. "G-Music Audio/Video Chart" (in Chinese). G-Music. Archived from the original on August 9, 2010..)	Certifications
Koda Kumi Live DVD Singles Best Ao Ban	Released: August 2, 2011; Label: Rhythm Zone; Formats: DVD Book	—	—	
Koda Kumi Live DVD Singles Best Aka Ban	Released: August 2, 2011; Label: Rhythm Zone; Formats: DVD Book	—	—	
Koda Kumi 10th Anniversary: Best Live Box DVD	Released: July 17, 2010; Label: Rhythm Zone; Formats: DVD Box	—	—	
15th Anniversary Best Live History DVD Book	Released: March 26, 2015; Label: Rhythm Zone; Formats: DVD Book	1	—	

=== Documentary albums ===
List of media, with selected chart positions
Title	Album details	Peak positions		Certifications
Title	Album details	JPN	TWN	Certifications
Koda Kumi Premium DVD	Released: January 29, 2010; Label: Rhythm Zone; Formats: DVD	—	—	
Live Tour 2016: Best Single Collection documentary film	Released: January 31, 2017; Label: Rhythm Zone; Formats: DVD, Blu-ray	—	—	

=== Music video albums ===
List of media, with selected chart positions
Title	Album details	Peak positions		Certifications
Title	Album details	JPN	TWN	Certifications
7 Spirits	Released: March 19, 2003; Label: Rhythm Zone; Formats: DVD	27	—	
Feel...	Released: March 24, 2004; Label: Rhythm Zone; Formats: DVD	13	—	
Girls: Selfish	Released: November 25, 2004; Label: Rhythm Zone; Formats: DVD	11	—	

=== Live albums ===
List of media, with selected chart positions
Title	Album details	Peak positions			Certifications
Title	Album details	JPN DVD	JPN Blu-ray	TWN	Certifications
Secret First Class Limited Live	Released: September 21, 2005; Label: Rhythm Zone; Formats: DVD, VCD	1	—	6	RIAJ: Platinum
Koda Kumi Live Tour 2005: First Things	Released: September 13, 2006; Label: Rhythm Zone; Formats: DVD, VCD	1	—	4	RIAJ: Gold
Koda Kumi Live Tour 2006–2007 Second Session	Released: March 28, 2007; Label: Rhythm Zone; Formats: DVD, Blu-ray	1	—	—	RIAJ: Gold
Live Tour 2007: Black Cherry	Released: March 31, 2008; Label: Rhythm Zone; Formats: DVD, VCD	1	—	3	RIAJ: Gold
Live Tour 2008: Kingdom	Released: September 24, 2008; Label: Rhythm Zone; Formats: DVD, Blu-ray	2	—	—	RIAJ: Gold
Fan Club Event 2008: Let's Party Vol. 1	Available only for fan club members; Released: February 25, 2009; Label: Rhythm Zone; Formats: DVD	—	—	—	
Live Tour 2009: Trick	Released: October 21, 2009; Label: Rhythm Zone; Formats: DVD, VCD	1	—	5	RIAJ: Gold
2009 Taiwan Live	Available only for fan club members; Released: March 10, 2010; Label: Rhythm Zone; Formats: DVD	—	—	3	
Live Tour 2010: Universe	Released: October 6, 2010; Label: Rhythm Zone; Formats: DVD, Blu-ray	1	—	—	
Eternity: Love & Songs at Billboard Live	Released: February 23, 2011; Label: Rhythm Zone; Formats: DVD, Blu-ray	2	—	—	
10th Anniversary: Fantasia in Tokyo Dome	Released: May 18, 2011; Label: Rhythm Zone; Formats: DVD, Blu-ray	1	3	3	
Live Tour 2011: Dejavu	Released: February 8, 2012; Label: Rhythm Zone; Formats: DVD, Blu-ray	1	5	6	
Premium Night: Love & Songs	Released: February 8, 2012; Label: Rhythm Zone; Formats: DVD, Blu-ray	5	—	10	
Live Tour 2013: Japonesque	Released: December 4, 2013; Label: Rhythm Zone; Formats: DVD, Blu-ray	2	9	9	
Hall Tour 2014: Bon Voyage	Released: October 8, 2014; Label: Rhythm Zone; Formats: DVD, Blu-ray	3	8	—	
Live Tour 2015: Walk of My Life	Released: December 2, 2015; Label: Rhythm Zone; Formats: DVD, Blu-ray	2	13	—	
Koda Kumi 15th Anniversary Live the Artist	Released: March 23, 2016; Label: Rhythm Zone; Formats: DVD, Blu-ray	6	17	—	
Live Tour 2016: Best Single Collection	Released: November 16, 2016; Label: Rhythm Zone; Formats: DVD, Blu-ray	2	11	—	
W FACE	Released: April 8, 2017; Label: Rhythm Zone; Formats: Live Venue only	—	—	—	
Live Tour 2017: W Face	Released: December 6, 2017; Label: Rhythm Zone; Formats: DVD, Blu-ray	4	17	—	
Live Tour 2018: DNA	Released: March 20, 2019; Label: Rhythm Zone; Formats: DVD, Blu-ray	2	—	—	
Live Tour 2019 Re(live): Japonesque	Released: March 11, 2020; Label: Rhythm Zone; Formats: DVD, Blu-ray	11	16	—	
Live Tour 2019 Re(live): Black Cherry	Released: March 11, 2020; Label: Rhythm Zone; Formats: DVD, Blu-ray	10	15	—	
20th Anniversary Tour 2020 My Name Is...	Released: March 10, 2021; Label: Rhythm Zone; Formats: DVD, Blu-ray	5	8	—	
KODA KUMI Love & Songs 2022	Released: August 24, 2022; Label: Rhythm Zone; Formats: DVD, Blu-ray	5	12	—	
KODA KUMI LIVE TOUR 2023: angeL&monsteR	Released: November 8, 2023; Label: Rhythm Zone; Formats: DVD, Blu-ray	7	10	—	
KODA KUMI LIVE TOUR 2024: BEST SINGLE KNIGHT	Released: December 25, 2024; Label: Rhythm Zone; Formats: DVD, Blu-ray	7	—	—	

== Filmography ==
This is a chronologically-ordered list of games, films and television shows in which Kumi Koda has appeared.

=== Films ===
Year	Film	Character	Notes
2004	Cutie Honey	Diva	Cameo, performing "The Theme of Sister Jill"
2006	Cherry Girl	Kumi	Main role. Appears on her Black Cherry album
2007	Saiyūki	Fake Sanzō Hōshi	
2021	Zokki	Adachi's wife	Support Role
2024	walk	Herself	KODA KUMI 25th Anniversary Documentary Film

=== Television shows ===
Year	Film	Character	Notes
2006	Busu no Hitomi ni Koi Shiteru	Kumi (greengrocer, friend of Miyuki)	Cameo, episode 11
2011	Ikemen desu ne	Herself	Cameo, episode 1
2019	Rika	Record producer	Cameo

=== Video games ===
Year	Film	Character	Notes
2003	Final Fantasy X-2	Lenne	Voice, performing "Real Emotion" and "1000 no Kotoba"
