= Best: 2000–2020 =

Greatest hits album by Koda Kumi
- Released: December 6, 2021
- Recorded: 2000–2021
- Genre: J-pop; R&B
- Label: Rhythm Zone

Koda Kumi chronology
Re(mix) (2020)	Best: 2000–2020 (2021)	Heart (2022)

Best: 2000–2020 stylized as (BEST ~2000–2020~) is a compilation album by Japanese singer-songwriter Koda Kumi, containing her most popular songs since her debut. The album was released on her twenty-first anniversary on December 6, 2021.

The album included all of her A-sides since she debuted with Take Back in December 2000 until her EP Angel + Monster in December 2020.

The album was released as a 3CD+DVD and a fan club exclusive 8CD+3Blu-ray. The covers for the album referenced both her prior greatest hits albums Best: Second Session (2006) and Best: Third Universe (2010). Both editions featured new arrangements for several previously released songs, including "Cutie Honey" and "Walk of My Life."

== Information ==
Best ~2000–2020~ is the eighth compilation album and fourth greatest hits album by Japanese artist Koda Kumi, released on her 21st anniversary, December 6, 2021. The album peaked at number 19 on its first week on the Oricon Albums Chart and remained on the charts for seven weeks, selling 7,080 units.

The album was released in two editions, a 3CD+DVD that was released publicly and a limited 8CD+3Blu-ray fan club exclusive. Both editions contained new arrangements of the songs "Cutie Honey", "Hands", "D.D.D", "LIT" and "Walk of My Life". The fan club edition housed every promotional single since her debut, while the standard edition contained her most popular singles from each album. The DVD held each of her most popular music videos, while the three Blu-rays carried every music video since 2000. The Blu-ray also featured the three music videos from Fever: Legend Live, which Koda Kumi had released during the promotional campaign for SANKYO's pachinko game, Fever Legend in 2014.

The album was preceded by the extended play Angel + Monster. However, the music videos for "Killer Monster" and "Run" were both omitted from the standard DVD and the limited Blu-ray.

There were several songs omitted from both the 8CD and 3CD editions, despite being released as A-sides throughout her career. These songs included "Won't Be Long" with Exile (2006), "Last Angel" featuring South Korean group TVXQ (2007), "Run for Your Life" (2007), "That Ain't Cool" featuring American artist Fergie (2008), "Faraway" (2009), "Walk ~To the Future~" (2010) and "Money in My Bag" (2014).

None of the songs from her cover albums Eternity: Love & Songs (2010) and Color the Cover (2013) were included in the set.

== Promotional activities ==
To help promote the album, Kumi released a "Best ~2000–2020~" version of her 2004 song "Cutie Honey" on October 25, 2021. On the same day, she also released the song "4 More" (stylized as 4 MORE) and "100 no Kodoku Tachi e" (100のコドク達へ / To 100 Lonely Souls). The latter two songs were released on her 2022 studio album Heart.

== Track listing ==
=== 8CD+3Blu-ray ===
CD1
No.	Title	Lyrics	Music	Length
1.	"Take Back"	Koda Kumi	Kazuhito Kikuchi	4:55
2.	"Trust Your Love"	Koda Kumi	Kazuhito Kikuchi	4:27
3.	"Color of Soul"	Natsumi Watanabe	Miki Watanabe	4:28
4.	"so into you"	Koda Kumi	Yasuhiro Abe	4:32
5.	"Love Across the Ocean"	Koda Kumi	Tsukasa	3:37
6.	"m•a•z•e"	Kenn Kato	Hiroo Yamaguchi	4:04
7.	"real Emotion"	Kenn Kato	Kazuhiro Hara	3:59
8.	"1000 no Kotoba"	Kazushige Nojima	Noriko Matsueda • Takahito Eguchi	5:58
9.	"Come With Me"	Koda Kumi	h-wonder	4:46
10.	"Gentle Words"	Kenn Kato	D.A.I	3:44
11.	"Crazy 4 U"	Miki Watanabe	Miki Watanabe	4:06
Total length:				43:41

CD2
No.	Title	Lyrics	Music	Length
1.	"Cutie Honey"	Kurodo Q.	Takeo Watanabe	3:06
2.	"Chase"	Koda Kumi • Kazuhiro Hara	Kazuhiro Hara	4:58
3.	"Kiseki"	Koda Kumi • Kosuke Morimoto	Kosuke Morimoto	4:58
4.	"Selfish"	Miki Watanabe	Miki Watanabe	3:53
5.	"Shake It"	Koda Kumi	Daisuke "D.I" Imai	3:48
6.	"24"	Koda Kumi • Hitoshi Shimono	Hitoshi Shimono	5:40
7.	"Hands"	Koda Kumi	Katsumi Ohnishi	4:25
8.	"Hot Stuff feat. KM-MARKIT"	Koda Kumi • KM-MARKIT	Daisuke Imai	4:06
9.	"Butterfly"	Koda Kumi	Miki Watanabe	4:18
10.	"flower"	Yoshi	Yasuo Ohtani	4:38
11.	"Promise"	Koda Kumi	Daisuke Imai	4:47
12.	"Star"	Koda Kumi	Kosuke Morimoto	4:05
Total length:				52:42

CD3
No.	Title	Lyrics	Music	Arranger(s)	Length
1.	"You"	Koda Kumi • Yoko Kuzuya	Yoko Kuzuya	Toru Watanabe	4:47
2.	"Birthday Eve"	Koda Kumi	Kosuke Morimoto	Tohru Watanabe	4:30
3.	"D.D.D. feat. Soulhead"	Soulhead	Soulhead • Octopussy	Octopussy	4:11
4.	"Shake It Up"	Koda Kumi • Hiroshi Kim	Hiroshi Kim	Invisible Hand	4:59
5.	"Lies"	Koda Kumi	Yanagiman	Yanagiman	5:22
6.	"Feel"	Koda Kumi • Hitoshi Shimono	Hitoshi Shimono	Hitoshi Shimono	4:16
7.	"Candy feat. Mr. Blistah"	Koda Kumi • Mr. Blistah	Daisuke "D.I" Imai	Daisuke "D.I" Imai	4:09
8.	"No Regret"	Tohru Watanabe	h-wonder		4:25
9.	"Ima Sugu Hoshii"	Aiko Machida • Zeebra • Jewels	Aiko Machida • DJ HASEBE	DJ HASEBE	4:33
10.	"Kamen feat. Tatsuya Ishii"	Tatsuya Ishii	Tatsuya Ishii	Yoichiro Kakizaki	5:14
11.	"Wind"	Koda Kumi • Kosuke Morimoto	Kosuke Morimoto	h-wonder	4:25
12.	"Someday"	Koda Kumi	Kotaro Egami	tasuku	4:17
13.	"Boys♥Girls"	Michikawa Himari	Hitoshi Shimono	Hitoshi Shimono	4:10
Total length:					59:18

CD4
No.	Title	Lyrics	Music	Arranger(s)	Length
1.	"Koi no Tsubomi"	Koda Kumi	Yusuke Kato	Yusuke Kato	4:06
2.	"Juicy"	Yo Taira	STY	STY	4:29
3.	"With your smile"	Koda Kumi	Tohru Watanabe	Tohru Watanabe	4:15
4.	"I'll Be There"	Koda Kumi	Shintaro Hagiwara	tasuku	4:15
5.	"Ningyo-Hime"	Koda Kumi	Miki Watanabe	Miki Watanabe	4:25
6.	"Yume no Uta"	Koda Kumi	Hiroo Yamaguchi	Tohru Watanabe	4:43
7.	"futari de..."	Koda Kumi	h-wonder	Hiroo Yamaguchi	4:43
8.	"Cherry Girl"	Koda Kumi	Curtis A.Richardson • Charlene Gilliam • Andreao "Fanatic" Heard & Sherrod Barnes	Andreao "Fanatic" Heard • The Conglomerate	3:55
9.	"Unmei"	Koda Kumi	Hirofumi Hibino	Masaki Iehara	4:21
10.	"BUT"	Koda Kumi	Tommy Henriksen	Tommy Henriksen	3:37
11.	"Aishou"	Koda Kumi	Reika Yuuki	Masaki Iehara	3:52
12.	"Freaky"	Koda Kumi	Henriksen	Henriksen	3:18
13.	"Ai no Uta"	Koda Kumi • Kosuke Morimoto	Kosuke Morimoto	Tomoji Sogawa	4:51
Total length:					54:50

CD5
No.	Title	Lyrics	Music	Arranger(s)	Length
1.	"anytime"	Koda Kumi	Hideya Nakazaki	Hideya Nakazaki	4:09
2.	"Moon Crying"	Koda Kumi	Miwa Furuse	h-wonder • Jun Abe	5:45
3.	"Once Again"	Pushim	PUSHIM • Shunya Mori	PUSHIM • Shunya Mori	4:41
4.	"Lady Go!"	Koda Kumi	Kousuke Morimoto	Yusuke Tanaka	4:54
5.	"Taboo"	Kumi Koda • HIRO	HIRO		3:50
6.	"stay with me"	Kumi Koda	Kazuto Narumi	Daisuke Kahara • Strings Arrangement: Yasuaki Maejima	4:53
7.	"It's All Love! (Koda Kumi x misono)"	Koda Kumi • misono	Kenichi Maeyamada	h-wonder	4:55
8.	"Lick me♥"	Koda Kumi		Hiroto Suzuki	3:29
9.	"Ecstasy"	Hum		Hum	3:28
10.	"Hashire!"	Koda Kumi		Shinjiroh Inoue	4:10
11.	"Alive"	Koda Kumi	Taro Iwashiro	George Frideric Handel	3:42
12.	"Physical Thing"	Koda Kumi	Hugo Lira • Ian-Paolo Lira • Negin • Nosheen • Thomas Gustafsson	Hugo Lira • Ian-Palo Lira • Thomas Gustafsson	2:59
13.	"Can We Go Back"	Koda Kumi • Adam Watts • Andy Dodd	Adam Watts • Andy Dodd	Adam Watts • Andy Dodd • Shanna Crooks	3:25
Total length:					54:20

CD6
No.	Title	Lyrics	Music	Arranger(s)	Length
1.	"Lollipop"	Koda Kumi	Ian Curnow • Jane Vaughan • Julie Morrison	Ian Curnow	3:23
2.	"Inside Fishbowl"	Koda Kumi	Niclas Lundin • Joakim Hahlin	Niclas Lundin • Joakim Hahlin	3:29
3.	"Outside Fishbowl"	Koda Kumi	Niclas Lundin • Joakim Hahlin	Niclas Lundin • Joakim Hahlin	3:28
4.	"For You"	Koda Kumi	Ryuichiro Yamaki	Ryuichiro Yamaki	5:54
5.	"Suki de, suki de, suki de."	Koda Kumi	Katsuhiko Sugiyama	Shinjiroh Inoue	4:58
6.	"Anata dake ga"	Koda Kumi	MARKIE SiZK from ★STAR GUiTAR	MARKIE SiZK	5:09
7.	"Pop Diva"	lil' showy	lil' showy	lil' showy	3:32
8.	"Poppin' Love Cocktail feat. Teeda"	Koda Kumi • Teeda	Back-On	Back-On • Jin	5:07
9.	"In the Air"	Koda Kumi	Erik Lidbom	Erik Lidbom	4:09
10.	"V.I.P."	Koda Kumi	Toby Gad • Jessica Cornish	Toby Gad	3:24
11.	"KO-SO-KO-SO"	Koda Kumi	Allan P Grigg • Kenichi Takemoto	Kool Kojak	3:19
12.	"Ai wo Tomenaide"	Koda Kumi	Noahisa Taniguchi • Hitoshi Munakata	Naohisa Taniguchi • Hitoshi Munakata	5:28
13.	"Love Me Back"	Koda Kumi	Matthew Tishler	Matthew Tishler	2:57
14.	"Go to the top"	Koda Kumi	Clarabell	Clarabell	3:49
15.	"Koishikute"	Koda Kumi	M.I • Jam9	Masaki Iehara	5:11
Total length:					1:03:17

CD7
No.	Title	Lyrics	Music	Arranger(s)	Length
1.	"LALALALALA"	Koda Kumi	Figge Brostrom • Anna Engh	Figge Brostrom • Anna Engh	3:37
2.	"Is This Trap?"	Koda Kumi	T-SK • HENRIK Nordenback • Christian Fast	T-SK	3:53
3.	"Touch Down"	Koda Kumi • Toby Gad • Joanna "JoJo" Levesque	Toby Gad	Toby Gad	3:44
4.	"Dreaming Now!"	Koda Kumi	Mitsu. J	Mitsu. J	4:18
5.	"Hotel"	Koda Kumi	H.U.B • Didrik Thott • Sebastian Thott • Ylva Dimburg	H.U.B • Didrik Thott • Sebastian Thott • Ylva Dimburg	3:22
6.	"So Fever"	Koda Kumi	NaNa★MUSiC • TRAK STA • EQ	NaNa★MUSiC • TRAK STA • EQ	3:24
7.	"Kimi Omoi"	Koda Kumi • Yoko Kuzuya	SAYALA • Mitsuki Shiokawa • Yoko Kuzuya	Yoko Kuzuya	5:18
8.	"Never Give It Up"	Koda Kumi	Takashi Iioka	Takashi Iioka	2:47
9.	"Dance in the Rain"	Koda Kumi	her0ism • Sigurd Rosnes • Melanie Fontana	her0ism • Sigurd Rosnes • Melanie Fontana	3:18
10.	"Shhh!"	Koda Kumi	Jamie Sellers • Nicole Simpson	Jamie Sellers • Nicole Simpson	3:17
11.	"LIT"	Koda Kumi	Hi-Yunk	Hi-Yunk	3:10
12.	"Hush"	Koda Kumi • TEEDA	Louise Frick-Sveen • Albin Nordqvist	Louise Frick-Sveen • Albin Nordqvist	3:50
13.	"Never Enough"		Matthew Tishler • Philip Bentley • Aimée Proal	Matthew Tishler • Philip Bentley • Aimée Proal	3:17
14.	"Eh Yo"	Koda Kumi	Hi-yunk	Hi-yunk	4:24
15.	"Summer Time"	Koda Kumi	Justin Reinstein • Maria Marcus	Justin Reinstein • Maria Marcus	3:36
Total length:					55:15

CD8
No.	Title	Lyrics	Music	Arranger(s)	Length
1.	"Do Me"	Koda Kumi	T-SK • HIROMI • Joleen Belle	T-SK • HIROMI • Joleen Belle	3:23
2.	"Goldfinger 2019"	Desmond Child • Draco Rosa • Kan Chinfa (Japanese translation)	Junnosuke Fujita • Baba Osuke • Yuto Shimizu • Shouya Matsuzaki • Hikaru Teraya • Makoto Nagatomo • Yoshihiro Tsujimoto	Junnosuke Fujita • Baba Osuke • Yuto Shimizu • Shouya Matsuzaki • Hikaru Teraya • Makoto Nagatomo • Yoshihiro Tsujimoto	4:33
3.	"Put Your Hands Up!!!"	Koda Kumi • 2SB	2SB	2SB	4:24
4.	"OMG"	Koda Kumi	T-SK • HIROMI • Joleen Belle • SIRIUS • Jasmine Anderson • Johan Johan Ramström	T-SK	3:56
5.	"Strip"	Koda Kumi	DWB • Katerina Bramley	DWB • Katerina Bramley	3:33
6.	"Get Naked"	Koda Kumi	Erika Nuri • Michael Anthony Naylor • Ronald M. Ferebee Jr. • Lindsay Johnson	Erika Nuri • Michael Anthony Naylor • Ronald M. Ferebee Jr. • Lindsay Johnson	3:20
7.	"Again"	Koda Kumi	2SB	2SB	5:20
8.	"Puff"	Koda kumi	Alyssa Ayaka Ichinose • Carlyle Fernandes • Gionata Caracciolo • Sara Spagnoli • Sofia Ahlang	Alyssa Ayaka Ichinose • Carlyle Fernandes	3:24
9.	"Lucky Star"	Koda Kumi	Christoffer Lauridsen • Andreas Öberg • Courtney Jenaé	Christoffer Lauridsen	3:34
10.	"XXKK"	Koda Kumi	Matt Wong • G'Harah "PK" Degeddingseze • Jamie Jones • Sydnie Brazile	G'Harah "PK" Degeddingseze • The Heavyweights	3:31
11.	"Cutie Honey" (Best ~2000–2020~ ver.)	Claude Q	Claude Q	Takeo Watanabe	4:24
12.	"Hands" (Best ~2000–2020~ ver.)	Koda Kumi	Katsumi Ohnishi	Katsumi Ohnishi	4:36
13.	"D.D.D." (Best ~2000–2020~ ver.)	Soulhead	Octopussy	Octopussy	4:21
14.	"LIT" (Best ~2000–2020~ ver.)	Koda Kumi	Hi-yunk	Hi-yunk	3:38
15.	"Walk of My Life" (Best ~2000–2020~ ver.)	Koda Kumi	Nick Carbone • Anthony Natoli • John Secolo • Peter Zizzo • Yukiko Tanaka	Nick Carbone • Anthony Natoli • John Secolo • Peter Zizzo • Yukiko Tanaka	3:48
Total length:					59:45

Blu-ray Disc 1
No.	Title	Length
1.	"Take Back" (Music Video)	4:59
2.	"Trust Your Love" (Music Video)	4:35
3.	"Color Of Soul" (Music Video)	4:31
4.	"So into You" (Music Video)	4:43
5.	"love across the ocean" (Music Video)	4:35
6.	"m•a•z•e" (Music Video)	4:10
7.	"real Emotion" (Music Video)	3:47
8.	"Come With Me" (Music Video)	5:54
9.	"Gentle Words" (Music Video)	3:56
10.	"Crazy 4 U" (Music Video)	4:20
11.	"Cutie Honey" (Music Video)	3:31
12.	"Chase" (Music Video)	5:24
13.	"Kiseki" (Music Video)	5:17
14.	"Selfish" (Music Video)	4:05
15.	"Shake It" (Music Video)	4:14
16.	"24" (Music Video)	5:49
17.	"hands" (Single Version) (Music Video)	4:42
18.	"Hot Stuff feat. KM-MARKIT" (Music Video)	4:36
19.	"Butterfly" (Music Video)	4:47
20.	"Promise" (Music Video)	5:03
21.	"Star" (Music Video)	1:41
22.	"you" (Music Video)	6:36
23.	"Birthday Eve" (Music Video)	4:43
24.	"D.D.D. feat. Soulhead" (Music Video)	4:24
25.	"Shake It Up" (Music Video)	5:17
26.	"Lies" (Music Video)	7:06
27.	"feel" (Music Video)	6:06
28.	"Candy feat. Mr. Blistah" (Music Video)	5:17
29.	"No Regret" (Music Video)	4:25
30.	"Ima Sugu Hoshii" (Music Video)	4:42
31.	"KAMEN feat. Tatsuya Ishii" (Music Video)	6:10
32.	"Wind" (Music Video)	4:27
33.	"Someday" (Music Video)	4:20
Total length:		2:38:12

Blu-ray Disc 2
No.	Title	Length
1.	"Koi no Tsubomi" (Music Video)	4:26
2.	"Juicy" (Music Video)	5:26
3.	"With your smile" (Music Video)	4:22
4.	"I'll be there" (Music Video)	4:53
5.	"Ningyo-Hime" (Music Video)	4:40
6.	"Yume no Uta" (Music Video)	4:47
7.	"futari de..." (Music Video)	4:43
8.	"Cherry Girl" (Music Video)	4:26
9.	"Unmei" (Music Video)	4:33
10.	"BUT" (Music Video)	3:56
11.	"Aishou" (Music Video)	4:03
12.	"FREAKY" (Music Video)	3:45
13.	"Ai no Uta" (Single Version) (Music Video)	4:45
14.	"anytime" (Single Version) (Music Video)	4:11
15.	"Moon Crying" (Music Video)	6:36
16.	"Taboo" (Music Video)	4:08
17.	"stay with me" (Music Video)	5:12
18.	"It's All Love!" (Koda Kumi x Misono) (Music Video)	5:02
19.	"Lick Me" (Music Video)	3:39
20.	"Ecstasy" (Music Video)	3:35
21.	"Hashire!" (Music Video)	4:14
22.	"Alive" (Music Video)	3:45
23.	"Physical Thing" (Music Video)	3:09
24.	"Can We Go Back" (Music Video)	4:37
25.	"Lollipop" (Music Video)	3:55
26.	"Inside Fishbowl" (Music Video)	3:25
27.	"Outside Fishbowl" (Music Video)	3:36
28.	"Suki de, Suki de, Suki de." (Music Video)	5:38
29.	"Anata Dake ga" (Music Video)	5:43
Total length:		2:09:10

Blu-ray Disc 3
No.	Title	Length
1.	"Pop Diva" (Single Version) (Music Video)	3:50
2.	"Poppin' love cocktail feat. TEEDA" (Music Video)	4:49
3.	"V.I.P." (Music Video)	3:55
4.	"KO-SO-KO-SO" (Music Video)	3:22
5.	"In The Air" (Music Video)	4:22
6.	"Ai o Tomenaide" (Music Video)	5:35
7.	"Love Me Back" (Single Version) (Music Video)	3:59
8.	"Go to the top" (Music Video)	4:02
9.	"Koishikute" (Music Video)	5:32
10.	"LALALALALA" (Music Video)	3:35
11.	"Touch Down" (Music Video)	3:47
12.	"Dreaming Now!" (Music Video)	4:45
13.	"Hotel" (Music Video)	3:27
14.	"So Fever" (Music Video)	3:41
15.	"Never Give It Up" (Music Video)	3:03
16.	"Kimi Omoi" (Music Video)	5:26
17.	"Dance in the Rain" (Music Video)	3:53
18.	"LIT" (Music Video)	3:16
19.	"Hush" (Music Video)	3:51
20.	"Never Enough" (Music Video)	3:35
21.	"Goldfinger 2019" (Music Video)	4:32
22.	"Get Naked" (Music Video)	3:20
23.	"Again" (Music Video)	5:24
24.	"Puff" (Music Video)	3:38
25.	"XXKK" (Music Video)	3:56
Total length:		1:42:35

=== 3CD+DVD (Spotify / Apple Music Streaming Version) ===
CD1
No.	Title	Lyrics	Music	Arranger(s)	Length
1.	"Take Back"	Koda Kumi	Kazuhito Kikuchi	h-wonder	4:55
2.	"Trust Your Love"	Koda Kumi	Kazuhito Kikuchi	h-wonder	4:27
3.	"Love Across the Ocean"	Koda Kumi	Tsukasa	h-wonder	3:37
4.	"real Emotion"	Kenn Kato	Kazuhiro Hara	h-wonder	3:59
5.	"Crazy 4 U"	Miki Watanabe	Miki Watanabe	Miki Watanabe	4:06
6.	"Cutie Honey"	Kurodo Q.	Takeo Watanabe	h-wonder	3:06
7.	"Hands"	Koda Kumi	Katsumi Ohnishi	h-wonder	4:25
8.	"Butterfly"	Koda Kumi	Miki Watanabe	Miki Watanabe	4:18
9.	"You"	Koda Kumi • Yoko Kuzuya	Yoko Kuzuya	Toru Watanabe	4:47
10.	"D.D.D. feat. Soulhead"	Soulhead	Soulhead • Octopussy	Octopussy	4:11
11.	"Wind"	Koda Kumi • Kosuke Morimoto	Kosuke Morimoto	h-wonder	4:25
12.	"Someday"	Koda Kumi	Kotaro Egami	tasuku	4:17
Total length:					50:33

CD2
No.	Title	Lyrics	Music	Arranger(s)	Length
1.	"Koi no Tsubomi"	Koda Kumi	Yusuke Kato	Yusuke Kato	4:06
2.	"Ningyo-Hime"	Koda Kumi	Miki Watanabe	Miki Watanabe	4:25
3.	"Yume no Uta"	Koda Kumi	Hiroo Yamaguchi	Tohru Watanabe	4:43
4.	"Ai no Uta"	Koda Kumi • Kosuke Morimoto	Kosuke Morimoto	Tomoji Sogawa	4:51
5.	"anytime"	Koda Kumi	Hideya Nakazaki	Hideya Nakazaki	4:09
6.	"Moon Crying"	Koda Kumi	Miwa Furuse	h-wonder • Jun Abe	5:45
7.	"Taboo"	Kumi Koda • HIRO	HIRO	HIRO	3:50
8.	"It's All Love! (Koda Kumi x misono)"	Koda Kumi • misono	Kenichi Maeyamada	h-wonder	4:55
9.	"Lollipop"	Koda Kumi	Ian Curnow • Jane Vaughan • Julie Morrison	Ian Curnow	3:23
10.	"Suki de, suki de, suki de."	Koda Kumi	Katsuhiko Sugiyama	Shinjiroh Inoue	4:58
11.	"Poppin' Love Cocktail feat. Teeda"	Koda Kumi • Teeda	Back-On	Back-On • Jin	5:07
12.	"Dance in the Rain"	Koda Kumi	her0ism • Sigurd Rosnes • Melanie Fontana	her0ism • Sigurd Rosnes • Melanie Fontana	3:18
Total length:					53:30

CD3
No.	Title	Lyrics	Music	Arranger(s)	Length
1.	"LIT"	Koda Kumi	Hi-Yunk	Hi-Yunk	3:10
2.	"Eh Yo"	Koda Kumi	Hi-yunk	Hi-yunk	4:24
3.	"Do Me"	Koda Kumi	T-SK • HIROMI • Joleen Belle	T-SK • HIROMI • Joleen Belle	3:23
4.	"Put Your Hands Up!!!"	Koda Kumi • 2SB	2SB	2SB	4:24
5.	"OMG"	Koda Kumi	T-SK • HIROMI • Joleen Belle • SIRIUS • Jasmine Anderson • Johan Johan Ramström	T-SK	3:56
6.	"Again"	Koda Kumi	2SB	2SB	5:20
7.	"Puff"	Koda kumi	Alyssa Ayaka Ichinose • Carlyle Fernandes • Gionata Caracciolo • Sara Spagnoli • Sofia Ahlang	Alyssa Ayaka Ichinose • Carlyle Fernandes	3:24
8.	"XXKK"	Koda Kumi	Matt Wong • G'Harah "PK" Degeddingseze • Jamie Jones • Sydnie Brazile	G'Harah "PK" Degeddingseze • The Heavyweights	3:31
9.	"Cutie Honey" (Best ~2000–2020~ ver.)	Claude Q	Claude Q	Takeo Watanabe	4:24
10.	"Hands" (Best ~2000–2020~ ver.)	Koda Kumi	Katsumi Ohnishi	Katsumi Ohnishi	4:36
11.	"D.D.D." (Best ~2000–2020~ ver.)	Soulhead	Octopussy	Octopussy	4:21
12.	"LIT" (Best ~2000–2020~ ver.)	Koda Kumi	Hi-yunk	Hi-yunk	3:38
13.	"Walk of My Life" (Best ~2000–2020~ ver.)	Koda Kumi	Nick Carbone • Anthony Natoli • John Secolo • Peter Zizzo • Yukiko Tanaka	Nick Carbone • Anthony Natoli • John Secolo • Peter Zizzo • Yukiko Tanaka	3:48
Total length:					52:19

DVD
No.	Title	Length
1.	"Take Back" (Music Video)	4:59
2.	"Trust Your Love" (Music Video)	4:35
3.	"love across the ocean" (Music Video)	4:35
4.	"real Emotion" (Music Video)	3:47
5.	"Crazy 4 U" (Music Video)	4:20
6.	"Cutie Honey" (Music Video)	3:31
7.	"hands" (Single Version) (Music Video)	4:42
8.	"Butterfly" (Music Video)	4:47
9.	"you" (Music Video)	6:36
10.	"D.D.D. feat. Soulhead" (Music Video)	4:24
11.	"Wind" (Music Video)	4:27
12.	"Someday" (Music Video)	4:20
13.	"Koi no Tsubomi" (Music Video)	4:26
14.	"Ningyo-Hime" (Music Video)	4:40
15.	"Yume no Uta" (Music Video)	4:47
16.	"Ai no Uta" (Single Version) (Music Video)	4:45
17.	"anytime" (Single Version) (Music Video)	4:11
18.	"Moon Crying" (Music Video)	6:36
19.	"Taboo" (Music Video)	4:08
20.	"It's All Love! (Koda Kumi x Misono)" (Music Video)	5:02
21.	"Lollipop" (Music Video)	3:55
22.	"Suki de, Suki de, Suki de." (Music Video)	5:38
23.	"Poppin' love cocktail feat. TEEDA" (Music Video)	4:49
24.	"Dance in the Rain" (Music Video)	3:53
25.	"LIT" (Music Video)	3:16
26.	"Again" (Music Video)	5:24
27.	"Puff" (Music Video)	3:38
28.	"XXKK" (Music Video)	3:56
Total length:		2:08:07

== Charts (Japan) ==
Release	Chart	Peak position	Chart run	Total sales
December 6, 2021	Oricon Daily Albums Chart	11		
December 6, 2021	Oricon Weekly Albums Chart	19	7 weeks	7,080
December 6, 2021	Oricon Monthly Albums Chart	38	7 weeks	11,000
