= Koda Kumi Live Tour 2006–2007 Second Session =

Video by Koda Kumi
- Released: 28 March 2007
- Recorded: 2007
- Genre: Pop, R&B, J-pop, dance-pop
- Label: Rhythm Zone
- Producer: Koda Kumi

Koda Kumi chronology
Koda Kumi Live Tour 2005: First Things (2005)	Koda Kumi Live Tour 2006–2007 Second Session (2007)	Live Tour 2007: Black Cherry (2007)

Koda Kumi Live Tour 2006–2007 ~Second Session~ (stylized as Live Tour 2006–2007 ~SECOND SESSION~) is the third concert tour DVD by Japanese singer-songwriter Koda Kumi. It became her third concert DVD to chart at No. 1 on Oricon.

== Information ==
Live Tour 2006–2007 ~Second Session~ is Japanese R&B-turned-pop artist Kumi Koda's third concert DVD. Much like her first two tour DVDs, Live Tour 2006–2007 ~Second Session charted at No. 1 on the Oricon Live DVD charts and remained on the charts for forty-seven weeks.

For the tour, Kumi visited thirty-six cities and performed at forty-six venues. First press editions included a special slipcase, a Cherry Girl performance performed at Rhythm Nation 2006, and an annual passport.

Bonus features on the second DVD included the music video for Love goes like..., which was one of two new songs released on the tour's corresponding album, Best ~second session~, and the performance for Everybody, which Kumi performed with Katori Shingo.

== Track list ==
(Source)

=== DVD1 ===
1. "Get It On"
2. "D.D.D. feat. Soulhead"
3. "Butterfly"
4. "Taisetsu na Kimi e"
5. "Ningyo-Hime"
6. "Hot Stuff feat. KM-MARKIT"
7. "Ima Sugu Hoshii"
8. "you"
9. "Koi no Tsubomi"
10. "Selfish / Crazy 4 U"
11. "Love goes like..."
12. "Ballad Medley ~Rain / 1000 no Kotoba / hands / Magic~"
13. "Someday"
14. "Birthday Eve"
15. "Shake It Up"
16. Encore
  "With your smile"
  "Cutie Honey"
  "Yume no Uta"
  "Wind"
  "walk"

=== DVD2 ===
1. "Live Documentary"
2. "Love goes like..." (Music Video)
3. "Unmei" (Live Version)
4. "Everybody" (Live with Katori Shingo)
5. "Cherry Girl" (Live Version)
