= Out Works & Collaboration Best =

Greatest hits album by Koda Kumi
- Released: March 25, 2009
- Recorded: 1999–2009
- Genre: Pop; R&B
- Label: Rhythm Zone

Koda Kumi chronology
Trick (2009)	Out Works & Collaboration Best (2009)	Koda Kumi Driving Hit's (2009)

Out Works & Collaboration Best is the fourth compilation album by Japanese singer-songwriter Koda Kumi, released two months after her studio album Trick, and the same day as her second remix album, Koda Kumi Driving Hit's. The album peaked on the Oricon charts at No. 7, staying on the charts for eight weeks.

The album housed most of her collaborative efforts with artists from varying labels, including KM-MARKIT from Pony Canyon and Fergie from Interscope Records. The only track to not be a collaboration was the first track, "Get It On", the short version of which had been released as the opening on her second compilation album, Best ~second session~ (2006).

== Information ==
Out Works & Collaboration Best is the fourth compilation album released by Japanese singer-songwriter Koda Kumi. The album peaked in the top 10 on the Oricon Albums Charts at No. 7, remaining on the charts for eight consecutive weeks. The album was released on the same day as her second remix album, Koda Kumi Driving Hit's (Koda Kumi Remix Album being her first in 2006).

The songs used on the album were remixed by duo House Nation, who would go on to work with Kumi for several other albums in her Driving Hit's series.

The CD did omit some collaborative efforts, including "Till Morning Comes" which featured rapper VERBAL" from Koda Kumi's album affection (2002), "Teaser" which featured rap duo Clench & Blistah" from Koda Kumi's album Grow into One (2003), "Every-After-Party" featuring Koda kumi from Rather Unique's album 99% Radio Show (2003), and "Everybody" featuring Koda Kumi from SMAP's album Pop Up! SMAP (2006). It also omitted all remixes Koda Kumi took part in with other artists.

The first track, "Get It On", was originally released as a digital download through mu-mo to those who had purchased all of the singles in Koda Kumi's 12 Singles Collection, which was a part of her Best ~second session~ album. The song on the album was the full version of the introduction from the same album. Get It On was originally released with its own single artwork and was even given a television advertisement through music.jp when it was first released in 2006.

== Track listing ==
(Source)

CD
No.	Title	Music	Original Album	Length
1.	"Get It On"	Koda Kumi		3:35
2.	"The Meaning of Peace"	Koda Kumi x BoA	Various Artists Featuring song+nation	5:00
3.	"Switch feat. Koda Kumi & Heartsdales"	LISA	Gratitude	5:28
4.	"Heat feat. MEGARYU"	Koda Kumi	Chase	4:17
5.	"It's A Small World feat. Heartsdales"	Koda Kumi	secret	2:47
6.	"Just Go feat. Koda Kumi"	JHETT a.k.a. YAKKO for AQUARIUS	JHETT	4:30
7.	"Hot Stuff feat. KM-MARKIT"	Koda Kumi	secret	4:08
8.	"RAINY DAY feat. Koda Kumi"	KM-MARKIT	VIVID	4:36
9.	"Super Sonic"	Koda Kumi x D.I	573 Records Special Compilation Album	3:39
10.	"Candy feat. Mr. Blistah"	Koda Kumi	BEST ~second session~	4:09
11.	"XXX feat. Koda Kumi"	Soulhead	Naked	4:13
12.	"KAMEN feat. Tatsuya Ishii"	Koda Kumi	BEST ~second session~	5:14
13.	"Joy -TRF meets Koda Kumi-"	TRF	Lif-e-Motions	5:24
14.	"Won't Be Long feat. Koda Kumi"	EXILE	Won't Be Long	5:14
15.	"Simple & Lovely -m-flo loves KodaKumi-"	m-flo	Cosmicolor	3:49
16.	"Last Angel feat. Tohoshinki"	Koda Kumi	Kingdom	3:52
17.	"That Ain't Cool feat. Fergie"	Koda Kumi	TRICK	3:32

== Oricon Charts (Japan) ==
Release	Oricon Singles Chart	Peak position	First week sales (copies)	Sales total (copies)
March 25, 2009	Daily Chart	5		48,715
March 25, 2009	Weekly Chart	7	43,402	48,715
