= Best: Second Session =

Greatest hits album by Koda Kumi
- Released: March 8, 2006
- Recorded: 2005–2006
- Genre: J-pop; R&B
- Length: 66:30
- Label: Rhythm Zone
- Producer: Daisuke “D.I” Imai, Hitoshi Shimono, Kosuke Morimoto, Aiko Machida, DJ Hasebe, h-wonder, Kim Hiroshi, Kotaro Egami, Soulhead, Tatsuya Ishii, Yanagiman, Yoko Kuzuya

Koda Kumi chronology
Koda Kumi Remix Album (2006)	Best: Second Session (2006)	Black Cherry (2006)

Singles from Best: Second Session
- 1. "You" Released: December 7, 2005; 2. "Birthday Eve" Released: December 14, 2005; 3. "D.D.D. feat. Soulhead" Released: December 21, 2005; 4. "Shake It Up" Released: December 28, 2005; 5. "Lies" Released: January 4, 2006; 6. "Feel" Released: January 11, 2006; 7. "Candy" Released: January 18, 2006; 8. "No Regret" Released: January 25, 2006; 9. "Ima Sugu Hoshii" Released: February 1, 2006; 10. "Kamen feat. Tatsuya Ishii" Released: February 8, 2006; 11. "Wind" Released: February 12, 2006; 12. "Someday/Boys & Girls" Released: February 22, 2006

Best: Second Session (stylized as Best ~second session~) is the second greatest hits album released by Japanese pop-R&B singer Koda Kumi. It was released in March 2006 and contained all of her singles used in her 12 Singles Collection. It charted at number 1 on the Oricon charts, making it her second album to reach the spot, and stayed on the charts for 78 weeks.

The album was released on CD, CD+DVD and a limited edition CD+2DVD, which carried part of her Live Tour 2005: First Things.

== Background and release ==
Best: Second Session is the second compilation album by Japanese artist Koda Kumi. It became her second album to chart at number one on Oricon and became her second longest-charting album. It contained every song from her 12 Singles Collection, causing there to be little room for new material. The two new songs on the album were "Love goes like..." and the bonus track "A Whole New World" featuring famed singer Peabo Bryson. This was a cover of the song from the Disney film Aladdin.

The first DVD portion of the album carried all of the music videos released for the singles. Limited editions also included the "...and "Wish Your happiness and love"", which was the story line music videos of "Candy feat. Mr. Blistah", "You", "Feel", "Lies" and "Someday" strung together in order. The special CD+2DVD editions contained the first leg to Kumi's Live Tour 2005: First Things. The concert DVD for her Best ~first things~ album would later be released in September 2006.

== Editions ==
Best: Second Session came in three editions. The CD-only version contains 14 tracks. CD+DVD contains 14 tracks and all of the music videos on the DVD. CD+2DVD contains 14 tracks, all of the music videos on the first DVD and her Live Tour 2005: First Things on the second DVD. The limited editions of all editions contained the bonus track "A Whole New World," which Kumi performed with singer Peabo Bryson. The limited editions of the CD+DVD contained the bonus footage "...and "Wish Your happiness & love"." The CD+2DVD editions were of limited release and contained all of the bonus features.

== Background and composition ==
Each single that preluded the album was released as part of Kumi's 12 Singles Collection. Each one had unique cover art based on certain cultures in various countries, while the back cover of each single was a piece to a puzzle, which could only be completed by purchasing all 12 singles. The same was done for the obi strips, which contained a full image when arranged together in order.

The track "You" was composed by music composer Toru Watanabe and performed by arranger and lyricist Yoko Kuzuya, who also worked on the lyrical portion with Kumi. The song carried elements of both pop and R&B, opening strong with a piano instrumental. "D.D.D." featured the members and sisters of Japanese musical duo Soulhead, Yoshika and Tsugumi, who also wrote and composed the piece, while the production was done by Octopussy. Musically, "D.D.D." is a dance song that borrows numerous musical elements such as R&B. The song borrows a 4-bar melody from the Missy Elliott and Rockwilder's remake of "Lady Marmalade".

"Candy", which featured rapper Mr. Blistah from the rap duo Clench & Blistah, was written and produced by Daisuke "D.I" Imai, who had worked with Kumi previously. Both Kumi and Mr. Blistah co-wrote the lyrics. "Kamen" featured Tatsuya Ishii from Kome Kome Club, who had written the lyrics to the song alongside Kazuhito Kikuchi. "Shake It Up" was composed by Kim Hiroshi. The song contained mainly elements of pop, yet despite the gothic theme, the song was about losing Yourself to music.

"Lies" was written and composed by musician and composer Yanagiman, while Kumi wrote the lyrical portion. "Birthday Eve" was written by Kosuke Morimoto. "No Regret" was a blend of R&B and electronic dance music. The music was composed and performed by H-Wonder, who also performed the track "Wind" (though the song was composed by Kousuke Morimoto), and the lyrics were written by Toru Watanabe.

"Ima Sugu Hoshii" was a cover of the Sugar Soul song by the same name, originally released in January 1997 and later put on their album Those Days. Sugar Soul's DJ Hasebe and Aiko Machida reproduced the single with Kumi, with the rap that Kumi performed in the bridge being a new addition – the rap lyrics were written by Japanese rapper Zeebra. "Someday" was written by Egami Kotaro and performed by tasuku, while Kumi wrote the lyrics. For "Feel", Kumi worked closely with Hitoshi Shimono, who had previously written and composed her song "24", and became her second song to have a chorus done in English.

== Special Single: Get It On ==
"Get On" is Kumi Koda's special limited single released as a digital download through mu-mo to those who purchased all twelve singles in her 12 Singles Collection. The song was released as a "short version" on her Best: Second Session album.

=== Overview ===
Get It On was released as a special, limited "00" single in her 12 Singles Collection to those who purchased all of the singles. After the release of Someday/Boys♥Girls, on February 28, 2006, buyers were presented a code, which they would type into mu-mo to be taken to a separate page to download the song. This was used in a similar way for fans to download Kumi's first remix album, Koda Kumi Remix Album, which was also released to those who had purchased all 12 singles from the collection.

Get It On was given its own album artwork and promotional artwork, despite being only a digital release. On March 1, 2006, mu-mo released a fifteen-second commercial for the song, encouraging those who had the code to download the song prior to it being removed from the market. The song would later be placed on her compilation album Out Works & Collaboration Best as track number one, which was released three years later on March 25, 2009. Keeping inline with the 12 singles' theme of a different culture on each cover, Get It On carried a Southeast Asian theme, most notably from Indonesia and the style of the belly dancers.

== Commercial performance ==
Within the first week, Best: Second Session sold nearly a million copies, bringing in a total of 983,353, making it her highest first-week sales, and has since sold over 2,000,000. It stayed number one on the charts the following week, making it her first album to stay at the spot for two consecutive weeks. The album became the second highest-selling album in Japan and the highest-selling for a female artist in 2006. According to IFPI the album was the 41st best-selling album worldwide in 2006.

== Music videos and promotion ==
While all of the music videos had been shown on music networks during the singles' initial releases, on the album, they were all placed on the first DVD in the order of their initial release, beginning with "You" and ending with "Someday." Limited editions contained the bonus footage "...and "Wish Your happiness & love," which strung together the five interconnecting videos to create one coherent story. There would later be a video for the new song on the album, "Love goes like...". The music video for this song would be released on her DVD for the album's corresponding concert tour, Live Tour 2006–2007: Second Session. To help promote Best: Second Session, Kumi made several appearances on radio shows and television shows, including performing "A Whole New World" live with Peabo Bryson.

== Track listing ==
CD
No.	Title	Lyrics	Music	Arranger(s)	Length
1.	"Introduction to the Second Session"	Koda Kumi	Daisuke "D.I" Imai	Daisuke "D.I" Imai	1:16
2.	"D.D.D. feat. SOULHEAD"	Soulhead	Soulhead • Octopussy	Octopussy	4:11
3.	"you"	Koda Kumi • Yoko Kuzuya	Yoko Kuzuya	Toru Watanabe	4:47
4.	"Candy feat. Mr. Blistah"	Koda Kumi • Mr. Blistah	Daisuke "D.I" Imai	Daisuke "D.I" Imai	4:09
5.	"Shake It Up"	Koda Kumi • Hiroshi Kim	Hiroshi Kim	Invisible Hand	4:59
6.	"feel"	Koda Kumi • Hitoshi Shimono	Hitoshi Shimono	Hitoshi Shimono	4:16
7.	"WIND"	Koda Kumi • Kosuke Morimoto	Kosuke Morimoto	h-wonder	4:25
8.	"Love goes like..."	Koda Kumi	Daisuke "D.I" Imai	Daisuke "D.I" Imai	4:04
9.	"No Regret"	Tohru Watanabe	h-wonder		4:25
10.	"Birthday Eve"	Koda Kumi	Kosuke Morimoto	Tohru Watanabe	4:30
11.	"Lies"	Koda Kumi	Yanagiman	Yanagiman	5:22
12.	"Ima Sugu Hoshii" (今すぐ欲しい / I Want You Now)	Aiko Machida • ZEEBRA • Jewels	Aiko Machida • DJ HASEBE	DJ HASEBE	4:33
13.	"KAMEN feat. Tatsuya Ishii"	Tatsuya Ishii	Tatsuya Ishii	Yoichiro Kakizaki	5:14
14.	"Someday"	Koda Kumi	Kotaro Egami	tasuku	4:17
15.	"A Whole New World feat. Peabo Bryson" (bonus track)	Tim Rice	Alan Menken		6:08

DVD1: Music Video
No.	Title	Length
1.	"you" (Music Video)	6:36
2.	"Candy feat. Mr. Blistah" (Music Video)	5:17
3.	"Ima Sugu Hoshii" (Music Video)	4:42
4.	"Birthday Eve" (Music Video)	4:43
5.	"feel" (Music Video)	6:06
6.	"D.D.D. feat. Soulhead" (Music Video)	4:24
7.	"KAMEN feat. Tatsuya Ishii" (Music Video)	6:10
8.	"Wind" (Music Video)	4:27
9.	"Lies" (Music Video)	7:06
10.	"No Regret" (Music Video)	4:25
11.	"Shake It Up" (Music Video)	5:17
12.	"Someday" (Music Video)	4:20
13.	"...and「Wish your happiness & love" ("Candy", "you", "feel", "Lies" and "Someday" placed in order to create the complete story)	22:33

DVD2: Live Video from Live Tour 2005 ~first things~
No.	Title	Length
1.	"Opening movie at OSAKA"
2.	"Butterfly"
3.	"Cutie Honey"
4.	"Chase"
5.	"Gentle Words"
6.	"Heat feat. MEGARYU"
7.	"Hot Stuff feat. KM-MARKIT"
8.	"Crazy 4 U"
9.	"hands"
10.	"No Tricks"
11.	"Rain" (Unplugged Version)
12.	"Take Back"
13.	"m•a•z•e"
14.	"Selfish"
15.	"Promise"
16.	"Star"
17.	"Trust Your Love"
18.	"Come With Me"
19.	"real Emotion"
20.	"the meaning of peace" (Single Version)
21.	"flower"
22.	"walk"

== Charts ==
=== Weekly charts ===
Chart (2006)	Peak position
Japanese Albums (Oricon)	1

=== Year-end charts ===
Chart (2006)	Position
Japanese Albums (Oricon)	2

== Certification and sales ==
Region	Certification	Certified units/sales
Japan (RIAJ)	2× Million	1,804,000
