= Koda Kumi Remix Album =

Remix album by Koda Kumi
- Released: February 22, 2006
- Recorded: 2005–2006
- Genre: House
- Label: Rhythm Zone

Koda Kumi chronology
Best ~first things~ (2005)	Koda Kumi Remix Album (2006)	Best ~second session~ (2006)

Koda Kumi Remix Album is the first remix album by Japanese R&B-turned-pop singer Koda Kumi. It was released on February 22, 2006, the same day as her last single from 12 Singles Project, Someday/Boys♥Girls. It was only available as a digital download to those who bought all 12 singles from Best ~second session~ album, and includes eight songs.

This was Kumi's first remix album before her Driving Hit's series of remix albums, which began in 2009.

== Information ==
Koda Kumi Remix Album is the first remix album by Japanese singer-songwriter Koda Kumi, released on February 22, 2006. It was released on the same day as her final single in her 12 Singles Project, Someday/Boys♥Girls.

The album was only released as a digital download to those who purchased all twelve singles in the project. It featured eight remixes out of the original twelve songs, including "you", which would become one of Kumi's most well-known ballads throughout her career.

Koda Kumi Remix Album would be her only remix album until the release of Koda Kumi Driving Hit's three years later in 2009. The latter album would be the start of a series Kumi would release in the coming years.

== Background and composition ==
The "A Cup of Cappuccino Bossanova" remix for "Birthday Eve" was inspired by the Brazilian music genre bossa nova, which was popularized throughout the 1950s and 1960s and became one of the most well-known Brazilian genres outside of Brazil. Kumi would have another song remixed in this style for her song "Koi no Tsubomi", which would be released three months later in May 2006.

"Someday" was remixed by Ryuichiro Yamaki (best known as "R. Yamaki"), who had worked on previous remixes of Koda Kumi songs, most notably "Yume with You", which had its remix placed on her album Feel My Mind. Yamaki has also worked with the likes of EXILE, BoA, Lead and Tohoshinki.

Remix artist Dub Master X (Izumi "D.M.X" Miyazaki) also worked on the album for the remix of "No Regret". D.M.X had worked predominantly with Kumi during her debut singles and albums, having remixed the songs "Take Back" and "Trust Your Love", along with her later song "Trust You" from her 2005 album secret.

== Track listing ==
No.	Title	Lyrics	Length
1.	"you" (Acoustic Piano mix)	Koda Kumi	4:53
2.	"Birthday Eve" (A Cup Of Cappuccino Bossanova Remix)	Koda Kumi	4:43
3.	"Shake It Up" (Kazz Caribbean Remix)	Koda Kumi • Kim Hiroshi	5:10
4.	"Lies" (Clubbangaz Remix)	Koda Kumi	5:05
5.	"Candy feat. Mr. Blistah" (MJ Mad reggaeton remix)	Koda Kumi • Mr. Blistah (rap)	4:11
6.	"No Regret" (Dub's not have regret either Remix)	Toru Watanabe	8:02
7.	"WIND" (PORTABLE WIND MIX)	Koda Kumi • Kousuke Morimoto	4:23
8.	"Someday" (R. Yamaki's Groove Mix)	Koda Kumi	4:50
