= Live Tour 2015: Walk of My Life =

15th Anniversary Live Tour 2015 ~Walk of My Life~

Video by Koda Kumi
- Released: 2 December 2015
- Recorded: 2015
- Genre: Pop, R&B, J-pop, dance-pop
- Label: Rhythm Zone
- Producer: Koda Kumi

Koda Kumi chronology
15th Anniversary Best Live History DVD Book (2015)	15th Anniversary Live Tour 2015; ~Walk of My Life~ (2015)	Live Tour 2016: Best Single Collection (2016)

Live Tour 2015: Walk of My Life (stylized as 15th Anniversary Live Tour 2015 ~WALK OF MY LIFE~) is Koda Kumi's 14th concert video and coincides with her album Walk of My Life. It debuted at No. 2 on the Oricon DVD charts. The concert was supported by Mercedes-Benz.

== Information ==
15th Anniversary Live Tour 2015 ~Walk of My Life~ is the fourteenth live concert released by Japanese singer-songwriter Koda Kumi. The concert was released in both DVD and Blu-ray formatting. The live continued her streak of top-charting live DVDs, ranking at No. 2 on the Oricon DVD/Blu-ray charts, charting for eight consecutive weeks.

Along with the standard editions released publicly, there were three editions released solely for her fan club Koda Gumi: a 2DVD edition that contained bonus performances throughout 2015, a 2CD edition carrying the audio of the concert, and a Blu-ray exclusive for her fan club. Those who purchased two of any of the editions also received a special prize.

While most of the track listing for the concert consisted of songs from Walk of My Life, several songs from other albums also made an appearance, including "hands" and "Butterfly" from Best ~first things~, all but "Juicy" from 4 Hot Wave and "Be My Baby" from Eternity ~Love & Songs~. She also performed the then-unreleased song "Bring It On", which she would later release on her 2017 album W Face ~inside~.

== Track listing ==
From the Koda Kumi 15th Anniversary web site.

=== DVD1 ===
1. "Prologue to Walk Of My Life"
2. "You can keep up with me"
3. "Mercedes"
  (Interlude movie 1)
4. "House Party"
5. "BUT/Shake It Up/D.D.D."
6. "Introduction ~Walk Of My Life~/Interlude ~Dance~"
7. "Lippy"
  (Interlude movie 2)
8. "hands"
9. "Sometimes Dreams Come True"
10. "Walk of My Life"
11. "Always"
12. "Gentle Words/Gimme U"
13. "Dance In The Rain"
  (Interlude movie 3)
14. "Piece in the Puzzle"
15. "Fake Tongue"
16. "Like It"
17. "Ningyo-hime/Freaky"
  -Band Part-
18. "Taboo/Hot Stuff"
19. "Bring It On"
20. "Be My Baby/Loaded"
21. "Life so Good!!"
  (Interlude movie 4)
22. "Encore"
  "Lady Go!/Wind/I'll be there/Butterfly/LALALALALA/Poppin' love cocktail"
  "walk"

=== DVD2 ===
1. "Brave" 2015.05.02 @Nippon Gaishi Hall
2. "Ai no Uta" 2015.05.09 @Ishikawa Prefectural Industrial Exhibition Hall
3. "futari de..." 2015.05.30 @Osaka-jō Hall
4. "Rain" 2015.06.28 @Saitama Super Arena
5. "Lippy [Live Background Movie]"
6. "Koda Kumi Live Tour 2015 ~Walk of My Life~ Documentary Film"
