= DDD (Koda Kumi song) =

"D.D.D."

Single by Koda Kumi featuring Soulhead

from the album Best: Second Session
- Released: December 21, 2005
- Recorded: 2005; (Japan)
- Genre: Dance-pop; R&B
- Length: 4:15
- Label: Avex; Avex Music Creative Inc.; Rhythm Zone; S.M. Entertainment
- Songwriters: Yoshika; Tsugumi
- Producer: Octopussy

Koda Kumi featuring Soulhead singles chronology
"Birthday Eve" (2005)	"D.D.D." (2005)	"Shake It Up" (2005)

Soulhead singles chronology
"Sparkle☆Train" (2005)	"D.D.D feat. Soulhead" (2005)	"Kimi no Kiseki/Itsumademo..." (2006)

Music video
- "D.D.D." on YouTube

"D.D.D." (stylised as "D.D.D. feat.SOULHEAD") is a song recorded by Japanese recording artist Koda Kumi, taken from her second greatest hits album, Best ~second session~ (2005). It contains guest vocals from Japanese music duo Soulhead. It was written by Soulhead members and sisters Yoshika and Tsugumi, with production being done by Octopussy. The song is Kumi's first collaborative effort since her single "Hot Stuff" with Japanese rapper KM-MARKIT, which was released a month prior. As part of Kumi's 12 Singles Collection releases, "D.D.D." premiered on December 21, 2005, as the third single from the album. The CD cover sleeve has Kumi wearing a black mini-dress and headdress. The cover sleeve is to represent the country United Kingdom, and its symbolism of Britannia.

Musically, "D.D.D." is a dance song that borrows numerous musical elements such as R&B. The song borrows a 4-bar melody from the Missy Elliott and Rockwilder's remake of "Lady Marmalade." The song is sung in half Japanese and half English. The song received favorable reviews from music critics, who commended the song's production and song writing. The composition and Soulhead's collaboration was also complimented.

Restricted to 50,000 units, "D.D.D." reached #5 on the Japanese Oricon Singles Chart, and sold over 48,000 units in that region. The song also reached number five on the Japanese Count Down TV Singles Chart. The accompanying music video for "D.D.D." was shot in Japan: it features Kumi and Soulhead dancing in a cave, with individual scenes of them with men in a jail cell. To promote the single, it was featured in several concert tours conducted by Kumi, including her tour for Best ~second session~ and her 2013 Japonesque tour. A variation of the single, entitled "XXX," was released by SOULHEAD on their single Pray/XXX in 2006.

== Background and composition ==
"D.D.D." was written by the members and sisters of Japanese musical duo Soulhead, Yoshika and Tsugumi, with production being done by Octopussy. Avex approached Yoshika and Tsugumi to collaborate with Koda Kumi, which they accepted. The song is Kumi's first collaborative effort since her single "Hot Stuff," which was with Japanese rapper KM-MARKIT, which had been released a month prior. "D.D.D." was one of three songs from Kumi's greatest hits album Best ~second session~ to have included featuring artists - the others songs were "Candy" featuring Mr. Blistah from rap duo Clench & Blistah, and "Kamen" with Tatsuya Ishii. "D.D.D." is also one of four songs from Best ~second session~ not co-written by Kumi. The others are "No Regret," "Ima Sugu Hoshii," and "Kamen". It was recorded in mid-2005 at Avex Studio in Tokyo, Japan.

Musically, "D.D.D." is a dance song that borrows numerous musical elements such as R&B. The song borrows a 4-bar melody from the Missy Elliott and Rockwilder's remake of "Lady Marmalade," which features singers Elliott, Mya, Pink, Lil' Kim and Christina Aguilera. The song is performed in half Japanese and half English, both performed equally by Kumi and Soulhead respectively. The title "D.D.D." is an abbreviation for triple diamond, which was quoted by several journalists when it was pre-released.

In February 2006, a variation of the single, entitled "XXX", was performed by Soulhead for their single Pray/XXX. This version credits Kumi as the featured artist and is inspired by groove music.

== Release and artwork ==
As part of Kumi's 12 Singles Collection, "D.D.D." premiered on December 21, 2005, as the third single from the album Best ~second session~. The single was released in two formats: a stand-alone CD single and a digital release. The CD single includes the original composition and the instrumental version. The CD cover sleeve has Kumi wearing a black mini-dress and donning a black headdress.

For the collection, each single was given its own unique cover art, each which represented a dress from a different culture. For the cover sleeve of "D.D.D.", Kumi chose to represent the United Kingdom and its symbolism of Britannia.

== Commercial performance ==
In Japan, "D.D.D." debuted at #5 on the Japanese Oricon Weekly Chart with an estimated 42,548 units in its first week. (Note: Sales provided by Oricon database and are rounded to the nearest thousand copies.) "D.D.D." managed to reach higher than "Birthday Eve" which charted at #6, but was one of her lowest charting singles. The song lasted for five weeks on the chart, and sold over 48,000 units. This was one of her best selling limited singles from Best ~second session~ alongside "Birthday Eve", "feel", and "Candy". "D.D.D." also entered at #5 on the Japanese Count Down TV Chart. It fell to #49 the following week, and lasted two weeks in the top 100 chart.

== Track listing ==
- Japanese CD single
1. "D.D.D feat. Soulhead" – 4:15
2. "D.D.D feat. Soulhead" (Instrumental) – 4:15
- Best: Second Session digital download
1. "D.D.D feat. Soulhead" – 4:15

== Personnel ==
Credits adapted from the liner notes of Best: Second Session.

- Koda Kumi – vocals, background vocals
- Yoshika (Soulhead member) – vocals, background vocals, songwriting
- Tsugumi (Soulhead member) – vocals, background vocals, songwriting
- Octopussy – production, composing, arrangement
- Avex Trax – Koda and Soulhead's record label, management
- Avex Music Creative Inc. – Koda and Soulhead's distribution label
- Rhythm Zone – Koda and Soulhead's record label, management
- S.M. Entertainment – Koda and Soulhead's distribution label
- Recorded in Tokyo, Japan, 2005

== Charts and sales ==
=== Charts ===
Chart (2005–2006)	Peak position
Japan Daily Singles Chart (Oricon)	3
Japan Weekly Singles Chart (Oricon)	5
Japan Weekly Count Down TV Singles Chart (TBS)	5

=== Sales ===
Region	Certification	Certified units/sales
Japan (RIAJ)	None	48,000

== Alternate Versions ==
Currently, there are three renditions of D.D.D. feat. SOULHEAD:

1. D.D.D. feat. SOULHEAD: Found on the single (2005) and corresponding album BEST ~second session~
2. D.D.D. feat. SOULHEAD [Instrumental]: Found on the single (2005)
3. D.D.D. feat. SOULHEAD [Pink Chameleon's Remix]: Found on Beach Mix (2012)
