= Live Tour 2016: Best Single Collection =

Live Tour 2016 Best Single Collection

Video by Koda Kumi
- Released: 16 November 2016
- Recorded: 2016
- Genre: Pop, R&B, J-pop, dance-pop, rock, hip-hop
- Label: Rhythm Zone
- Producer: Koda Kumi

Koda Kumi chronology
Live Tour 2015: Walk of My Life (2015)	Live Tour 2016; Best Single Collection (2016)	Live Tour 2017: W Face (2017)

"Koda Kumi Live Tour 2016: Best Single Collection" (stylized as KODA KUMI LIVE TOUR 2016 ~Best Single Collection~) is a live concert DVD by Japanese R&B/pop artist Koda Kumi. It was released on 16 November 2016, two months after the tour ended on 11 September 2016.

== Information ==
Live Tour 2016 ~Best Single Collection~ is the thirteenth concert DVD from Japanese singer-songwriter Koda Kumi, released in both DVD and Blu-ray formats. The DVD was released two months post tour on 16 November. The DVD charted at No. 2 on the Oricon Live Charts and remained on the charts for nine weeks.

It became her first hall tour where she performed in all 47 prefectures of Japan, including her hometown in the Kyoto Prefecture of the Kansai region on Honshu. The concert consisted of her most popular and well-known songs since her debut in December 2000.

To help promote the tour, Kumi released a promotional single titled Shhh!. While one edition of the single was released for a limited time to the public on mu-mo, three other editions were sold only at concert venues. The song was the opening number to each performance.

== Track list ==
=== DVD ===
1. "Shhh!"
2. "Butterfly"
3. "Won't Be Long ~Red Cherry Version~"
4. "BUT / Lollipop"
5. "Trust Your Love / Love Across the Ocean / real Emotion / Take Back / Someday"
6. "Crazy 4 U"
  <Interlude Movie 1>
7. "1000 no Kotoba / you / Kiseki"
8. "Koishikute"
9. "Moon Crying"
10. "Koi no Tsubomi"
11. "I'll be there"
12. "Ai no Uta"
13. "Kimi Omoi"
  <Band and Dancer Part>
14. "Dance in the Rain"
15. "Can We Go Back"
16. "Ningyo-hime / Freaky"
17. "Pop Diva"
18. "Dreaming Now!"
19. "Lick me♥"
20. "With your smile"
  <Interlude Movie 2>
  -Encore-
21. "Cutie Honey / Shake It Up / LALALALALA / Wind"
22. "walk ~to the future~
23. "Bonus Movie"
  "Interlude Movie Collection" (Poppin' love cocktail feat. TEEDA, LALALALALA, Moon Crying, Yume no Uta)
  "Live Tour 2016 ~Best Single Collection~ Documentary Trailer"
