= Kamen (song) =

"Kamen feat. Tatuya Ishii"

Single by Koda Kumi

from the album Best: Second Session
- Released: February 8, 2006 (JP)
- Recorded: 2005
- Genre: J-pop
- Label: Rhythm Zone; RZCD-45310 (Japan, CD)
- Songwriter: Tatsuya Ishii

Koda Kumi singles chronology
"Ima Sugu Hoshii" (2006)	"Kamen feat. Tatuya Ishii" (2006)	"Wind" (2006)

Music video
- "Kamen" on YouTube

Kamen feat. Tatsuya Ishii (仮面 / Mask) (stylized as KAMEN feat. 石井竜也) is the tenth single of Koda Kumi's 12 Single Collection and featured Kome Kome Club's frontman Tatsuya Ishii. Like many of the other singles released in the collection, KAMEN was also limited to 50,000 copies. The song debuted at No. 3 on Oricon and charted for six weeks.

== Information ==
Kamen is Japanese singer-songwriter Koda Kumi's tenth single in her 12 Singles Collection. It featured Tatsuya Ishii (also known as Tatuya Ishii) from the famed group Kome Kome Club, who had written the lyrics to the song alongside composer Kazuhito Kikuchi. At the time, Kazuhito Kikuichi had just separated from the rock duo Breath. As with most of the other singles in the collection, the single was limited to 50,000 copies.

Each single in the 12 Singles Collection had unique cover art based on certain cultures in various countries. The back cover of each single was a piece to a puzzle, which could only be completed by purchasing all twelve singles. The same was done for the obi strips, which contained a full image when arranged together in order. However, the obi strip image was omitted on the Hong Kong versions.

Unlike usual singles, Kamen carried three different karaoke versions of the title track: one for men, one for women and a full instrumental. The "with your darling version" omitted Kumi's voice, but kept Tatsuya's. The "with your honey version" omitted Tatsuya's voice, but kept Kumi's. The final track was the full instrumental, omitting both artists' voices.

Though limited to 50,000 copies, Kamen still managed to sell 46,971 copies as of 2006.

== Music video ==
"Kamen" feat. Tatsuya Ishii was not part of the story-themed music videos.

The music video carried a Phantom of the Opera theme, but with the female lead, played by Kumi, falling in love with the masked man, reciprocating the Phantom's love and affection. The video carried many visual themes that Kumi would later use in her videos for Unmei and Aishou.

== Cover ==
As with the other singles in this collection, the cover of the single represents a stylized version of a traditional dress from a culture; this time it draws its inspiration from Hawaii and the costumes of hula dancers. This is the third single that draws from the United States of America, the others being you and Birthday Eve.

== Track listing ==
(Source)

All tracks are written by Tatsuya Ishii.

No.	Title	Length
1.	"Kamen feat. Tatsuya Ishii"	5:24
2.	"Kamen feat. Tatsuya Ishii" (with your darling version)	5:24
3.	"Kamen feat. Tatsuya Ishii" (with your honey version)	5:24
4.	"Kamen feat. Tatsuya Ishii" (Instrumental)	5:24
Total length:		21:36
