= Japanese edition =

Japanese editions of physical music records

Japanese editions, Japanese versions, or Japanese imports are domestic pressings of foreign-released records and CDs in Japan. Most Western music sold in Japan is pressed and distributed domestically. These releases typically feature one or more bonus tracks not included on standard pressings of the same record elsewhere. These extra tracks are often unique songs that are entirely exclusive to the Japanese release, but they can also be remixes or demo recordings of songs already on the record, or non-album singles that did not previously get a physical release. Additionally, these Japanese editions often include liner notes and translations of the lyrics into Japanese. Because of the bonus content and geographic confinement, these editions are more highly sought after by record collectors.

The Japanese edition of a record can be visually distinguished by the addition of a cardboard obi, which is usually folded over the left side of the cover. In this context, these obi are commonly called spine cards in English, particularly by collectors.

== Rationale ==
In Japan, the cost of manufacturing CDs and vinyl records can be up to 30–40 percent higher than overseas. As a result, it is usually less expensive for Japanese buyers to import records from elsewhere rather than purchasing domestically produced versions. To incentivize domestic shoppers to buy physical releases manufactured in Japan, record labels often add extra tracks that are not available on the standard edition sold elsewhere.

== See also ==
- Deluxe album
- Record sales
