= Wind (song) =

Single by Koda Kumi

from the album Best: Second Session
- Released: February 12, 2006 (JP)
- Genre: J-pop, pop rock
- Label: Rhythm Zone; RZCD-45311 (Japan, CD)
- Songwriters: Koda Kumi, Kousuke Morimoto, h-wonder

Koda Kumi singles chronology
"Kamen" (2006)	"Wind" (2006)	"Someday/Boys♥Girls" (2006)

Music video
- "Wind" on YouTube

Wind (stylized as WIND) is a Japanese pop song by Kyoto-born singer Koda Kumi and is the 11th single in her 12 Singles Collection. Much like the other singles in the collection, this single is also limited to 50,000 copies. The single managed to chart at No. 3 on Oricon and charted for six weeks.

== Information ==
Wind is Japanese singer-songwriter Koda Kumi's eleventh single in her 12 Singles Collection. It peaked on the Oricon Singles Charts at No. 3 and remained on the charts for six consecutive weeks. As with most of the singles, Wind was limited to 50,000 copies.

Each single in the 12 Singles Collection had unique cover art based on certain cultures in various countries. The back cover of each single was a piece to a puzzle, which could only be completed by purchasing all twelve singles. The same was done for the obi strips, which contained a full image when arranged together in order. However, the obi strip image was omitted on the Hong Kong versions.

The song was used as the theme song to Fuji TV's Torino 2006 Relay (トリノ2006 中継 / TORINO 2006 Chuukei). It was also used as Kumi's final performance song during a-nation '06, which was changed from "Shake It Up."

"Wind" was the second pop song Kumi released during the collection series, the first being "Birthday Eve." The music video for the song featured Kumi's dog, Rum, becoming the second music video to do so, the first being "Candy."

== Music video ==
"Wind" was not part of the story-themed videos.

The music video for "Wind" carried a cute story of a scientist experimenting on her assistant, played by Rum (Kumi's dog), with comical results. The entire video was filmed in front of a green screen with hand-drawn animation that Kumi would interact with.

Kumi would use this style again for the music video of her 2008 song "Wonderland."

== Cover ==
As with the other singles in the collection, the cover of the single takes inspiration from a different country and/or culture. Wind's cover takes inspiration from Italy due to the Torino 2006 Relay taking place in Italy.

== Track listing ==
(Source)

CD
No.	Title	Lyrics	Music	Arranger(s)	Length
1.	"WIND"	Koda Kumi • Kousuke Morimoto	h-wonder	Kousuke Morimoto
2.	"WIND" (Instrumental)		h-wonder	Kousuke Morimoto

== Alternate versions ==
WIND

1. WIND: Found on the single and corresponding album BEST ~second session~ (2006)
2. WIND [Instrumental]: Found on the single (2006)
3. WIND [Portable Wind Mix]: Found on Koda Kumi Remix Album (2006)
