= No Regret (song) =

Single by Koda Kumi

from the album Best: Second Session
- Released: January 25, 2006 (JP)
- Recorded: 2005
- Genre: Electronica, R&B, Dance
- Label: Rhythm Zone; RZCD-45307 (Japan, CD)
- Songwriters: Toru Watanabe, h-wonder

Koda Kumi singles chronology
"Candy" (2006)	"No Regret" (2006)	"Pray/XXX feat. Koda Kumi" (2006)

Music video
- "No Regret" on YouTube

"No Regret" is an R&B song by singer-songwriter Koda Kumi. The song debuted on the Oricon charts at No. 4, remaining on the charts for twelve weeks. The single made it the eighth release for her 12 Singles Collection, and, unlike the majority of the singles, was not limited to 50,000 copies. This was one of three that were not limited, the other being the first single in the collection, you, and the final single, Someday/Boys♥Girls.

== Information ==
No Regret is Japanese singer-songwriter Kumi Koda's eighth single in her 12 Singles Collection and twenty-sixth overall. It managed to peak at No. 4 on the Oricon Singles Charts and remained on the charts for twelve weeks. Unlike most of the other singles in the collection, No Regret was not limited to 50,000 copies. This was only done with two other singles in the collection: you and Someday/Boys♥Girls. No Regret sold 72,081 copies within the first week and, as more recent figures show, it has sold a total of 131,348 copies.

Each single in the 12 Singles Collection had unique cover art based on certain cultures in various countries. The back cover of each single was a piece to a puzzle, which could only be completed by purchasing all twelve singles. The same was done for the obi strips, which contained a full image when arranged together in order. However, the obi strip image was omitted on the Hong Kong versions.

"No Regret" is a blend of R&B and electronic dance music. The music was composed and performed by musical composer h-wonder, who had previously composed the bulk of the music for Kumi's debut studio album affection, and the lyrics were written by Toru Watanabe, who had written the musical score to the first single in the 12 Singles Collection, "you." The b-side to the single was an alternate version of "Rain," the original which had previously been released on her third studio album, Feel My Mind. However, while the b-side was an alternate version, the instrumental for the piece was that of the version originally placed on the 2004 album.

To help promote the single, "No Regret" was used as the opening theme to the second season of the Japanese anime series, The Law of Ueki, which was an adaptation of the manga of the same name. The theme of the story was a battle between candidates to decide the next god of the Celestial World.

== Music video ==
"No Regret" was not part of the story-themed videos like "you," "Lies," "feel" and "Someday."

The music video did take on a Charlie's Angels theme with a trio of crime fighters who go undercover at a nightclub. In the video, several homages are paid to the Wachowski brothers' 1999 science fiction film The Matrix, with Kumi performing some of the shots with bullet time visual effects.

This theme would later be built upon in Koda Kumi's theatrical debut, Cherry Girl, which was released on her sixth studio album, Black Cherry.

== Cover ==
For the collection, each single was given its own unique cover art, each which represented a dress from a different culture.

No Regret took its inspiration from the country of India.

Along with differing cover art, each obi strip contained a piece of an image, which when put together in order, would reveal a full picture of Kumi. The same was done for the back covers of each single.

== Track listing ==
(Source)

CD
No.	Title	Lyrics	Music	Arranger(s)	Length
1.	"No Regret"	Toru Watanabe	h-wonder	h-wonder	4:28
2.	"Rain" (Unplugged Version)	Koda Kumi	Kaoru Kato	Hiroo Yamaguchi	5:44
3.	"No Regret" (Instrumental)		h-wonder	h-wonder	4:28
4.	"Rain" (Album Instrumental Version)		Kaoru Kato	Hiroo Yamaguchi	5:09

== Charts ==
Oricon Sales Chart (Japan)

Release	Chart	Peak position	First week sales	Sales total	Chart run
January 25, 2006	Oricon Daily Singles Chart	4			
January 25, 2006	Oricon Weekly Charts	4	72,081	131,348	6 weeks
January 25, 2006	Oricon Monthly Charts	5			
January 25, 2006	Oricon Yearly Charts	74			

== Alternate Versions ==
No Regret

1. No Regret: Found on the single and corresponding album BEST ~second session~ (2006)
2. No Regret [Instrumental]: Found on the single (2006)
3. No Regret [Dub's not have regret either remix]: Found on Koda Kumi Remix Album (2006)
4. No Regret [Future House United Remix]: Found on Koda Kumi Driving Hit's 2 (2010)
