= Shake It Up (Koda Kumi song) =

Single by Koda Kumi

from the album Best: Second Session
- Released: December 28, 2005
- Recorded: 2005
- Genre: J-pop; electronic dance
- Label: Rhythm Zone
- Composer: Invisible Hand
- Lyricists: Koda Kumi; Kim Hiroshi

Koda Kumi singles chronology
"D.D.D." (2005)	"Shake It Up" (2005)	"Lies" (2006)

Music video
- "Shake It Up" on YouTube

"Shake It Up" is a single by Koda Kumi and charted number six on the Oricon Singles Chart, remaining on the charts for five weeks. It was used as the ending theme to The Sunday, an informational program shown on NTV.

== Information ==
Shake It Up is Japanese, R&B-turned-pop singer-songwriter Koda Kumi's fourth single in her 12 Single Collection. It hit No. 6 on the Oricon Singles Charts and remained on the charts for five consecutive weeks. Like the other singles in the collection, "Shake It Up" was limited to 50,000 copies.

Each single in the 12 Singles Collection had unique cover art based on certain cultures in various countries. The back cover of each single was a piece to a puzzle, which could only be completed by purchasing all twelve singles. The same was done for the obi strips, which contained a full image when arranged together in order. However, the obi strip image was omitted on the Hong Kong versions.

"Shake It Up" was used as the ending theme of Nippon TV's informational program The Sunday (THE・サンデー) through the month of December 2005. The show was broadcast live every Sunday from October 1, 1989, until September 28, 2008 [in March 2011, it was renewed as The Sunday Next (TheサンデーNEXT)].

The song contained mainly elements of pop with the music video showing a darker theme of a puppet brought to life and controlled by two puppet masters. Despite the gothic theme, the song itself was about losing yourself to music. "Shake It Up" was composed by musical composer and lyricist Kim Hiroshi. Hiroshi had previously composed the music for Kumi's song "life" from her Kiseki single and had also worked with fellow label-mate BoA.

== Music video ==
"Shake It Up" was not part of a story line and carried a dark gothic theme.

In the video, Kumi is dressed in lolita fashion, and shown to be a mannequin in a tailor's room. When the clock strikes a certain hour, her mannequin form comes to life. Throughout the video, it shows the mannequin being controlled by two puppet masters, who have her dance for their amusement. Another incarnation of Kumi, who dons a pink dress, watches the clock that brought the mannequin to life. When the clock strikes again, the mannequin returns to its normal life and position in the tailor's room as the Kumi in the pink dress leaves the clock.

Despite the music video's dark theme, the song itself was more optimistic. The song's lyrics are about letting go of life's worries and living for the sound of music.

== Promotional advertisements ==
To help promote the single, "Shake It Up" was used as the ending theme of Nippon television's talk show The Sunday throughout the month of December in 2005. She also performed the song live during her Live Tour 2006–2007 ~Second Session~ and later during her tours for her 15th Anniversary Tour ~Walk of My Life~ (2015) and her Best Single Collection tour in 2016.

== Cover ==
For the collection, each single was given its own unique cover art, each which represented a dress from a different culture. The cover for Shake It Up represents Brazil and the style of Brazilian Carnival Samba dancers. Along with differing cover art, each obi strip contained a piece of an image, which when put together in order, would reveal a full picture of Kumi. The same was done for the back covers of each single.

== Track listing ==
Japanese CD single
No.	Title	Lyrics	Music	Arranger(s)	Length
1.	"Shake It Up"	Koda Kumi • Kim Hiroshi	INVISIBLE HAND	Kim Hiroshi
2.	"Shake It Up" (Instrumental)		INVISIBLE HAND	Kim Hiroshi

== Chart statistics ==
=== Sales ===
Initial week estimate: 44,419 Total estimate: 47,014

== Alternate versions ==
Shake It Up

1. Shake It Up: Found on the single (2005) and corresponding album BEST ~second session~ (2006)
2. Shake It Up [Instrumental]: Found on the single (2005)
3. Shake It Up [Kazz Caribbean Remix]: Found on Koda Kumi Remix Album (2006)
4. Shake It Up [House Nation Sunset in Ibiza Remix]: Found on Koda Kumi Driving Hit's 2 (2010)
