= Birthday Eve =

Single by Koda Kumi

from the album Best: Second Session
- Released: 14 December 2005
- Recorded: 2005
- Genre: J-pop
- Length: 9:02
- Label: Rhythm Zone
- Composer: Kosuke Morimoto
- Lyricist: Koda Kumi

Koda Kumi singles chronology
"You" (2005)	"Birthday Eve" (2005)	"D.D.D feat. SOULHEAD" (2005)

Music video
- "Birthday Eve" on YouTube

Birthday Eve is a limited-edition single by Japanese R&B-turned-pop artist Koda Kumi. It was the second release in her 12 Singles Collection and charted No. 6 on Oricon, remaining for four weeks. The single became the first release to be limited to 50,000 units, which would be done for all but three of the singles in the collection.

Parts of the music video took inspiration from American actress Marilyn Monroe's 1953 film Gentlemen Prefer Blondes. The song was written by Kosuke Morimoto and performed by Toru Watanabe, both who had worked previously with Kumi.

== Information ==
Birthday Eve is Japanese singer-songwriter Koda Kumi's twentieth single and second in her 12 Singles Collection. It charted No. 6 on the Oricon Singles Charts and remained on the charts for four weeks. Unlike the previous single in the collection, "you," "Birthday Eve" was limited to 50,000 copies. This was the case with most of the twelve singles, the only exceptions being the aforementioned "you," "No Regret" and "Someday/Boys♥Girls."

Each single in the 12 Singles Collection had unique cover art based on certain cultures in various countries. The back cover of each single was a piece to a puzzle, which could only be completed by purchasing all twelve singles. The same was done for the obi strips, which contained a full image when arranged together in order. However, the obi strip image was omitted on the Hong Kong versions.

The song itself was pop and was about planning the following day for her and her boyfriend. It was written by composer Kosuke Morimoto, who has worked with the likes of Ayumi Hamasaki, BoA and South Korean group Tohoshinki. Kosuke had previously worked with Kumi for the song "Star" from her single Promise/Star. Toru Watanabe, who had worked with Kumi for the previous single, "you," had arranged the piece.

For the music video, parts were inspired by American actor Marilyn Monroe's 1953 film Gentlemen Prefer Blondes. The section of the video, in which Kumi is surrounded by men in wrestling masks and tuxedos, was an homage to the scene in Marilyn's version of the song "Diamonds Are a Girl's Best Friend" where she is surrounded by well-dressed men. Kumi would later perform another homage to the scene in her music video for "show girl" from her 2009 studio album Trick.

== Music video ==
Unlike the first single in the collection, "Birthday Eve" was not part of a story line. The music video depicted Kumi as a girlfriend getting ready for the evening, where she would go out to celebrate her boyfriend's birthday. Throughout the video, she is shown making a cake and showing scenes about how her boyfriend spoils her when they go out. During the video, there is an homage to Marilyn Monroe's rendition of "Diamonds Are a Girl's Best Friend" with Kumi donning a pink dress as she walks down a flight of stairs with several men donning wrestling masks and tuxedos.

== Promotional advertisements ==
To help promote the single, "Birthday Eve" was used in a television advertisement for NTT DoCoMo Tokai (エヌ・ティ・ティ・ドコモ東海 / ENU•TI•TI•DoKoMo Toukai). NTT DoCoMo is a mobile phone operator based in the Sanno Park Tower in the Nagatachō prefecture of Chiyoda, Tokyo and began in 1991.

== Cover ==
For the collection, each single was given its own unique cover art, each which represented a dress from a different culture. Though the previous single, you, represented the state of Alaska in the United States, this single's cover represented the lower 48 states of the United States of America, most notably California.

Kumi would draw inspiration from the state of California again for the covers of her 2007 single Freaky and her 2013 single Summer Trip. Along with differing cover art, each obi strip contained a piece of an image, which when put together in order, would reveal a full picture of Kumi. The same was done for the back covers of each single.

== Track listing ==
Japanese CD single
No.	Title	Lyrics	Music	Arranger(s)	Length
1.	"Birthday Eve"	Koda Kumi	Kosuke Morimoto	Toru Watanabe
2.	"Birthday Eve" (Instrumental)

== Chart history ==
Oricon Sales Chart (Japan)

Release	Chart	Peak position	First week sales	Sales total	Chart run
14 December 2005	Oricon Daily Singles Chart	2			
14 December 2005	Oricon Weekly Charts	6	44,294	47,661	3 weeks
14 December 2005	Oricon Monthly Charts				
14 December 2005	Oricon Yearly Charts	191			

== Alternate Versions ==
Birthday Eve

1. Birthday Eve: Found on the single (2005) and corresponding album BEST ~second session~ (2006)
2. Birthday Eve [Instrumental]: Found on the single (2005)
3. Birthday Eve [Cup of Cappuccino Bossanova Remix]: Found on Koda Kumi Remix Album (2006)
