= Candy (Koda Kumi song) =

Single by Koda Kumi

from the album Best: Second Session
- Released: January 18, 2006 (JP)
- Recorded: 2005
- Genre: J-pop; bhangra; R&B
- Length: 8:30
- Label: Rhythm Zone; RZCD-45308 (Japan, CD); SM Entertainment; SMJTCD-095 (Korea, CD)
- Songwriters: Daisuke "D.I" Imai, Koda Kumi • Mr. Blistah

Koda Kumi singles chronology
"Feel" (2006)	"Candy" (2006)	"No Regret" (2006)

Music video
- "Candy" on YouTube

Candy is the seventh single of the 12 Singles Collection by Japanese artist Koda Kumi. The single featured rapper Mr. Blistah from Clench & Blistah, and became her second to feature an artist – her first being "D.D.D.," which featured Soulhead. As with the majority of the singles in the collection, the single was limited to 50,000 copies. The single peaked at No. 3 on the Oricon charts and charted for seven weeks.

== Information ==
Candy is singer-songwriter Koda Kumi's seventh single released in her 12 Singles Collection and twenty-fifth overall single. The single became her second in the series to feature an artist – her first being "D.D.D.," which featured sister-duo Soulhead – and featured rapper Mr. Blistah from the rap duo Clench & Blistah (known as CLENCH&BLISTAH in Japan). Kumi had worked with both rappers in 2003 for her song "Teaser," which was the first track on her second studio album Grow into One.

The single ranked in the top five on the charts, taking the No. 3 spot on the Oricon Singles Charts, and remained on the charts for seven weeks. As with many of the other singles in the collection, this single was also limited 50,000 copies.

Each single in the 12 Singles Collection had unique cover art based on certain cultures in various countries. The back cover of each single was a piece to a puzzle, which could only be completed by purchasing all twelve singles. The same was done for the obi strips, which contained a full image when arranged together in order. However, the obi strip image was omitted on the Hong Kong versions.

The song was written and produced by Daisuke "D.I" Imai, who had worked with Kumi several times in the past and would work with her many times in the future. Daisuke has been producing music in Japan and for avex artists since 1999. While the song's score was written by Daisuke, Kumi and Blistah co-wrote the lyrics. Kumi's lyrical portion was about wanting something beyond appearances, money and sex, while Blistah's portion was about offering money and pleasure.

While "Candy" was the seventh single released in the collection, its accompanying music video was the prelude to the story-line driven videos, "you," "Lies," "feel" and, ultimately, "Someday." The video opened with narration, done in English.

== Music video ==
The music video for the song was the first in the story-line driven videos; the continuing stories being "you," "feel" and "Lies."

Unlike the other music videos, which featured the love interests discussing heartbreak, "Candy" opened with narration spoken in English. The video carried the theme of a wealthy prince from the Underworld, played by Mr. Blistah, attempting to buy the affection and love of the princess of the sky, played by Kumi, who had no desire of love or power. He attempts to seduce her by giving her the powers of fire and ice, but ultimately fails. Towards the end, the dragon turns back into a dog who runs down the hallway. Dissatisfied with monetary possessions, the princess travels to Earth and splits herself into several different personas to find what love is and why it is considered special.

This leads her to the loves in the following videos "you," "Lies," "feel" and the conclusion in "Someday."

== Cover ==
For the collection, each single was given its own unique cover art, each which represented a dress from a different culture.

The cover of Candy represented an African theme, whereas Africa is a large continent with many different cultures.

Along with differing cover art, each obi strip contained a piece of an image, which when put together in order, would reveal a full picture of Kumi. The same was done for the back covers of each single.

== Track listing ==
(Source)

CD
No.	Title	Lyrics	Music	Arranger(s)	Length
1.	"Candy feat. Mr. Blistah"	Koda Kumi • Mr. Blistah	Daisuke "D.I" Imai	Daisuke "D.I" Imai	4:15
2.	"Candy feat. Mr. Blistah" (Instrumental)		Daisuke "D.I" Imai	Daisuke "D.I" Imai	4:15

== Chart statistics ==
Chart (2006)	Peak position
Oricon Weekly Single 200	3
Oricon Daily Single 50	2
Oricon Tracks Chart	5

=== Sales ===
- Initial week estimate: 39,110
- Total estimate: 47,856

== Alternate Versions ==
Candy feat. Mr. Blistah

1. Candy feat. Mr. Blistah: Found on the single and corresponding album BEST ~second session~ (2006)
2. Candy feat. Mr. Blistah [Instrumental]: Found on the single (2006)
3. Candy feat. Mr. Blistah [MJ Mad Reggaeton remix]: Found on Koda Kumi Remix Album (2006)
