= Feel (Koda Kumi song) =

Single by Koda Kumi

from the album Best: Second Session
- Released: January 11, 2006
- Recorded: 2005
- Genre: J-pop; soul
- Length: 4:19
- Label: Rhythm Zone; SM
- Songwriters: Koda Kumi; Hitoshi Shimono

Koda Kumi singles chronology
"Lies" (2006)	"Feel" (2006)	"Candy" (2006)

Music video
- "Feel" on YouTube

"Feel" is a smooth R&B song by Japanese singer and songwriter Koda Kumi. For the song, she worked closely with composer Hitoshi Shimono, who had composed the instrumental. The single is Kumi's sixth single in her 12 Singles Collection and second single to chart at No. 1 on Oricon, selling 39,110 units within the first week. As with some of the other singles released in the collection, Feel was limited to 50,000 copies.

== Background and release ==
"Feel" is Japanese singer-songwriter Koda Kumi's sixth single in her 12 Singles Collection. As with the other singles in the collection, "Feel" was limited to 50,000 copies. It shifted 39,110 units within the first week. Despite it being limited, it became her second single to reach No. 1 on the weekly Oricon Singles Charts – her first being "You", which was also released for the collection.

For the song, Kumi worked closely with musical composer Hitoshi Shimono. She had worked with him previously for her 2004 song "24," which was released on Kumi's first DVD single, girls ~selfish~, and on her fourth studio album, secret. This made it her second song to have a chorus completely in English.

=== Cover ===
Each single in the 12 Singles Collection had unique cover art based on certain cultures in various countries. The cover for "Feel" draws its inspiration from Spain and the costume of matadors. The back cover of each single was a piece to a puzzle, which could only be completed by purchasing all twelve singles. The same was done for the obi strips, which contained a full image when arranged together in order. However, the obi strip image was omitted on the Hong Kong versions.

== Music video ==
The music video for the song became the fourth in the story-line driven videos; the firsts being "Candy," "You" and "Lies." This was the final video before the conclusion on her final single in the collection, Someday/Boys♥Girls.

As with both "You" and "Lies," "Feel" opens with three men talking about the heartbreak they had experienced in their lives and the women they were with. Each man had a passion that they followed and found a lover who shared in their interests. Each video in the music video stories focuses on one of the men at the table, with their love interests being different incarnations of Kumi.

The love interest in "Feel" is played by Japanese actor Shugo Oshinari, whose passion is music. He becomes enthralled with an R&B lounge singer, played by Kumi, and the two begin a romance. After they breakup, he continues to frequent the lounge, reminiscing on the times Kumi was on the stage. There is a scene where Kumi has stripped her clothing in lingerie before she gets in bed with her boyfriend. Afterwards, Kumi writes the song on a piece of paper and towards the end, she vanishes leaving her boyfriend in distraught.

== Promotion ==
To help promote the single, "Feel" was used in an advertisement for the website music.jp, which is a music distributor site for Japan. The site is also used by the RIAJ Digital Track Chart to measure cellphone downloads for musical tracks. The music video for the single tied into the four others in the story line: "Candy," which featured rapper Mr. Blistah from Clench & Blistah, "You," "Lies" and "Someday," the latter of which was the finale. The love interest in the music video was played by Japanese actor Shugo Oshinari. Shugo Oshinari is best known for his portrayals of Teru Mikami in the Death Note TV series and Takuma Aoi in Battle Royale II: Requiem.

== Track listing ==
CD single
No.	Title	Lyrics	Music	Arranger(s)	Length
1.	"Feel"	Koda Kumi, Hitoshi Shimono	Hitoshi Shimono	Hitoshi Shimono
2.	"Feel" (Instrumental)		Hitoshi Shimono	Hitoshi Shimono

== Sales ==
- Initial week estimate: 39,110
- Total estimate: 48,116
