= Ima Sugu Hoshii =

"Ima Sugu Hoshii (今すぐ欲しい)"

Single by Koda Kumi

from the album Best: Second Session
- Released: February 1, 2006 (JP)
- Recorded: 2005
- Genre: J-pop; dance-pop; electropop
- Length: 9:08
- Label: Rhythm Zone RZCD-45309 (Japan, CD); SM Entertainment SMJTC-097 (Korea, CD)
- Songwriters: Zeebra, Aiko Machida, Jewels, DJ HASEBE
- Producer: DJ Hasebe

Koda Kumi singles chronology
"Pray/XXX feat. Koda Kumi" (2006)	"Ima Sugu Hoshii (今すぐ欲しい)" (2006)	"Kamen" (2006)

Music video
- "Ima Sugu Hoshii" on YouTube

Ima Sugu Hoshii (今すぐ欲しい / Want You Now) is the ninth single in Japanese singer Koda Kumi's 12 Single Collection. As with the other singles, Ima Sugu Hoshii was limited to 50,000 copies. It debuted at No. 2 on Oricon Daily, taking No. 5 for the week, and charted for seven weeks.

== Information ==
Ima Sugu Hoshii is Japanese singer-songwriter Koda Kumi's ninth single in her 12 Single Collection and twenty-seventh overall. The single debuted at No. 2 on the Oricon Singles Charts and too the fifth slot of the week, remaining on the charts for seven weeks. As with the majority of the singles in the collection, Ima Sugu Hoshii was limited to 50,000 copies.

Each single in the 12 Singles Collection had unique cover art based on certain cultures in various countries. The back cover of each single was a piece to a puzzle, which could only be completed by purchasing all twelve singles. The same was done for the obi strips, which contained a full image when arranged together in order. However, the obi strip image was omitted on the Hong Kong versions.

The song is a cover of the Sugar Soul song by the same name, originally released in January 1997 and later put on their album Those Days. Sugar Soul's DJ HASEBE and Aiko Machida reproduced the single with Kumi. However, the rap that Kumi performed for the bridge was not in the original song. Japanese rapper Zeebra wrote the lyrics for the rap. ZEEBRA had also worked with rapper KM-MARKIT during their time together in the Ubarian Gym, and who Kumi had worked with for her song "Hot Stuff" and KM-MARKIT's song "Rainy Day." Jewels from the sister duo the Heartsdales also assisted in writing the lyrics.

In South Korea, the single was released under the name Jigeum baro weonhaeyo (지금 바로 원해요 / I want it right now) and was initially banned due to the explicit lyrics. However, the song was later restricted from being played on the radio until after ten o'clock in the evening.

== Music video ==
"Ima Sugu Hoshii" was not part of the story-themed videos and, instead, carried a theme of Kumi trying to find a suitor.

Much like the lyrics, the video itself was very risque, with Kumi in lingerie during her solo scenes and with several of the suitors performing illicit acts in front of her. Most notably was when two men began kissing and performing sexual acts. Due to the taboo of homosexuality in Japan, this type of imagery had not been used in mainstream music videos.

== Cover ==
For the collection, each single was given its own unique cover art, each which represented a dress from a different culture.

Ima Sugu Hoshii took influence from the country of France, and showcased the art form of ballet.

Along with differing cover art, each obi strip contained a piece of an image, which when put together in order, would reveal a full picture of Kumi. The same was done for the back covers of each single.

== Track list ==
(Source)

CD
No.	Title	Lyrics	Music	Arrangers	Length
1.	"Ima Sugu Hoshii" (今すぐ欲しい / I Want You Now)	Zeebra • Aiko Machida • Jewels	DJ HASEBE • Aiko Machida	DJ HASEBE	4:36
2.	"Ima Sugu Hoshii" (Instrumental)		DJ HASEBE • Aiko Machida	DJ HASEBE	4:32

== Charts ==
Chart (2006)	Peak position
Oricon Daily Single 50	2
Oricon Weekly Single 100	5
Oricon Tracks Chart	7

=== Sales ===
- Initial week estimate: 35,966
- Total estimate: 47,411
