= Lies (Koda Kumi song) =

Single by Koda Kumi

from the album Best: Second Session
- Released: January 4, 2006
- Recorded: 2005
- Genre: J-pop; R&B
- Length: 5:20
- Label: Rhythm Zone; SM
- Songwriters: Koda Kumi; Yanagiman

Koda Kumi singles chronology
"Shake It Up" (2005)	"Lies" (2006)	"Feel" (2006)

Music video
- "Lies" on YouTube

"Lies" is a song recorded by Japanese singer-songwriter Koda Kumi, serving as the fifth single in her 12 Singles Collection. The lyrics are written by Kumi and the music is written and arranged by Yanagiman. The song is the ending theme of Asahi TV's show Adore na! Garejji. It was also used in a commercial for music.jp. It peaked at number five in its second week on Oricon and helped Kumi become to first artist to have three singles in the top 10 during the same week.

== Background and release ==
"Lies" is Koda Kumi's fifth single in her 12 Singles Collection. It is the second to be released in the story-driven videos – her first being "You," which was also the first in the collection. Like most of the other singles in the collection, "Lies" was limited to 50,000 copies.

"Lies" was written and composed by musician and musical composer Yanagiman. Along with working with various Japanese artist – SMAP, Lisa and Hitomi – Yanagiman has written music for South Korean artist BoA and American artist Usher. The lyrics to song were written by Kumi herself. The song was about a couple who gradually started to fight more and more. Despite the constant arguing, they still loved each other, though they disliked fighting.

== Cover ==
For the collection, each single was given its own unique cover art, each which represented a dress from a different culture. The cover of "Lies" draws its inspiration from China. Along with differing cover art, each obi strip contained a piece of an image, which when put together in order, would reveal a full picture of Kumi. The same was done for the back covers of each single.

== Music video ==
While the music video for "Lies" is the second in the 12 Singles Collection, it is the third in a music video-driven story, its predecessors being "Candy," which featured rapper Mr. Blistah from Clench & Blistah, and "You". As with "You," "Lies" opens with three men talking about the heartbreak they had experienced in their lives and the women they were with. Each man had a passion that they followed and found a lover who shared in their interests. Each video in the music video stories focuses on one of the men at the table, with their love interests being different incarnations of Kumi.

The protagonist in "Lies" is played by Japanese actor Shogen Itokazu, whose passion is knife throwing, and who finds a lover, played by Kumi, who offers to be the target during his shows. They end up arguing when one of his knives scratches her cheek during a show and she begins to question his method and her safety. Kumi tries to touch her lover in bed but he pushes her away. In the shower, they begin to caress when he sees blood on his fingers due to an accident at a knife throwing routine where his knife scratches Kumi's cheek. He walks out, leaving Kumi alone. Towards the end of the video, it has been revealed that he has been cheating on her with another girl and in response, Kumi handcuffs him and angrily throws a knife below his bulge, leaving him.

== Commercial performance ==
The single made its debut on the Oricon Singles Charts at number seven and managed to take the number five rank the following week. With the song debuting at number seven, Kumi became the first artist to have three singles in the top 10 on the Oricon at the same time ("You" was at number nine and "Shake It Up" was at number six).

== Usage in media ==
The song was used as the ending theme to the TV show Adore na! Garejji. Adore na! Garejji is a late-night television program on the TV Asahi network. The music video for "Lies" tied into four other videos released during the 12 Singles Collection: "Candy," "you," "feel" and "Someday." The protagonist in the video is played by Shogen Itokazu, who is best known for his role as young Gouken in Street Fighter: Assassin's Fist and his work in the 2015 Death Note TV series.

== Track listing ==
CD
No.	Title	Lyrics	Music	Arranger(s)	Length
1.	"Lies"	Koda Kumi	Yanagiman	Yanagiman	5:20
2.	"Lies" (Instrumental)		Yanagiman	Yanagiman	5:20

== Sales ==
Initial week estimate: 43,900 Total estimate: 46,989
