= You (Koda Kumi song) =

Single by Koda Kumi

from the album Best: Second Session
- B-side: "Sweet Kiss"
- Released: December 7, 2005
- Recorded: 2005
- Genre: J-pop
- Length: 17:52
- Label: Rhythm Zone
- Songwriters: Koda Kumi; Yoko Kuzuya; Toru Watanabe

Koda Kumi singles chronology
"Promise/Star" (2005)	"You" (2005)	"Birthday Eve" (2005)

Music video
- "You" on YouTube

"You" (stylized as "you") is a song by Japanese singer Koda Kumi, serving as her 19th single and the first to be released as part of her 12 Singles Collection. It became her first single to achieve the number one position on the weekly Oricon Singles Chart. As of April 2011, "You" is certified platinum for digital cellphone downloads by the RIAJ.

== Background ==
"You" is Japanese singer-songwriter Kumi Koda's first single in her 12 Singles Collection. It became her second single to debut at No. 1 and first to hold the No. 1 spot for the weekly ranking on the Oricon Singles Charts. Her first the debut at the top spot was "Butterfly," but "Butterfly" had dropped to take the number-two slot for the week.

Each single in the 12 Singles Collection had unique cover art based on certain cultures in various countries. The back cover of each single was a piece to a puzzle, which could only be completed by purchasing all twelve singles. The same was done for the obi strips, which contained a full image when arranged together in order. However, the obi strip image was omitted on the Hong Kong versions. The cover for "You" represented the Inuit culture in Alaska. Along with differing cover art, each obi strip contained a piece of an image, which when put together in order, would reveal a full picture of Kumi. The same was done for the back covers of each single.

== Composition ==
"You" was composed by music composer Toru Watanabe and performed by arranger and lyricist Yoko Kuzuya, who also worked on the lyrical portion with Kumi. The song carries elements of both pop and R&B, opening strong with a piano instrumental. The single was also only one of three in the collection to garner a b-side, the others being No Regret and Someday/Boys♥Girls. The b-side for this single was "Sweet Kiss," which is an uptempo pop song. The song was composed by Atsushi Sato (known as ats-) from the Japanese pop band HΛL, who had previously worked with Kumi's label-mate Ayumi Hamasaki.

== Music video ==
While the music video for "You" is the first in the 12 Singles Collection, it is the second in a music video-driven story, its predecessor being "Candy," which featured rapper Mr. Blistah from Clench & Blistah. It is also tied into three other videos: "Lies," "feel" and "Someday."

"You" opens with three men talking about the heartbreak they had experienced in their lives and the women they were with. Each man had a passion that they followed and found a lover who shared in their interests. Each video in the music video stories focuses on one of the men at the table, with their love interests being different incarnations of Kumi.

The protagonist in "You" is played by Japanese actor Takashi Tsukamoto, whose passion is photography. He finds a lover, played by Kumi, who he believes to have "the perfect image." Throughout the video, it shows the couple starting off happy and enjoying his passion. However, the woman becomes frustrated, believing his photography to mean more to him than she does. The video is in a winter setting where Kumi walks down the street in white clothing while she is in tears over her failed relationship. Kumi sleeps in bed alone while waiting for her call from her boyfriend and when she takes down pictures of the two, he tries calling her, but Kumi hangs up on him before he can catch up with her. The video ends as we see photographs of Kumi and her boyfriend together falling from the sky before the last shot of their picture is shown. Kumi would later have a reedited version of the music video during her Live Tour 2016 ~Best Single Collection~.

== Track listing ==
CD single
No.	Title	Lyrics	Music	Arranger(s)	Length
1.	"You"	Koda Kumi, Yoko Kuzuya	Toru Watanabe	Yoko Kuzuya	4:48
2.	"Sweet Kiss"	Koda Kumi, Hirotake Onishi	Atsushi Sato (ats-)	Toru Watanabe	4:02
3.	"You" (Instrumental)		Toru Watanabe	Yoko Kuzuya	4:41
4.	"Sweet Kiss" (Instrumental)		Atsushi Sato (ats-)	Toru Watanabe	4:02

== Charts ==
=== Weekly charts ===
Chart (2005)	Peak position
Japan Singles (Oricon)	1

=== Monthly charts ===
Chart (2005)	Peak position
Japan Singles (Oricon)	7

=== Year-end charts ===
Chart (2005)	Position
Japan Singles (Oricon)	50

== Sales and certifications ==
Region	Certification	Certified units/sales
Japan (RIAJ) Physical single	Gold	190,060
Japan (RIAJ) Chaku-uta	3× Platinum	750,000^{*}
Japan (RIAJ) Chaku-uta full	Platinum	250,000^{*}
^{*} Sales figures based on certification alone.
