= Girls: Selfish =

Video by Koda Kumi
- Released: 25 November 2004
- Recorded: 2004
- Genre: J-pop, R&B
- Label: Rhythm Zone

Koda Kumi chronology
Feel... (2004)	Girls: Selfish (2004)	Secret First Class Limited Live (2005)

Girls: Selfish (stylized as girls ~Selfish~) is the second music video DVD from Japanese artist Koda Kumi and her first DVD single. It was released on November 25, 2004 and was the prelude to her fourth studio album secret.

== Information ==
girls ~Selfish~ was Koda Kumi's first attempt at releasing a DVD single. It failed to chart on Oricon, but all of the videos would later be placed on her next studio album, secret.

The three music videos on the DVD share the similar theme of the long process of meeting, falling in love, and then breaking up. Koda Kumi chose to focus on the jealous-side and possessiveness women experience over love, which is most apparent in the video for "Selfish." Despite the similar theme, the videos are not intertwined and each stand alone.

The song "24" (track #3) was the first time Koda Kumi released a song with an entire chorus in English, which was written and composed by Hitoshi Shimono. She would later work with Hitoshi again for her 2006 song "feel."

Due to the failure of the DVD single format, Koda Kumi would not release another DVD single until 2012's Love Romance, which was created for pachinko games throughout Japan.

== Music videos ==
The video for "Selfish" carries a theme of a group of female vampires, who use their sex appeal to lure men into their home. They then seduce them and turn them into subordinates.

"Shake It" (stylized as SHAKE IT) has a seductive theme, in which Koda Kumi finds a man sneaking around her tent and uses her power of seduction to get him to leave. After she and her mates finish and believe they've won, the man is shown making a phone call, to whom is unknown.

"24" is a soft and sensual video with a smooth R&B theme, focusing on Koda Kumi in her downtime.

== Track listing ==
(Official Track List)

DVD
No.	Title	Lyrics	Music	Length
1.	"Selfish"	Miki Watanabe	Miki Watanabe	4:05
2.	"Shake It"	Koda Kumi	Daisuke "D.I" Imai	4:03
3.	"24"	Koda Kumi; Hitoshi Shimono	Hitoshi Shimono	5:49
