= Someday/Boys & Girls =

"Someday/Boys♥Girls"

Single by Koda Kumi

from the album Best: Second Session
- Released: February 22, 2006 (JP)
- Genre: J-pop
- Label: Rhythm Zone; RZCD-45312 (Japan, CD)

Koda Kumi singles chronology
| "Wind" (2006) | "Someday/Boys♥Girls" (2006) | "Koi no Tsubomi" (2006) |

Music video
- "Someday" on YouTube

"Someday/Boys & Girls" (stylized as "Someday/Boys♥Girls") is the final single of Koda Kumi's 12 Single Collection and overall thirtieth single. Unlike the majority of singles in the collection, this single is not limited to 50,000 copies. The single charted at No. 3 on Oricon and charted for nine weeks.

== Information ==
Someday/Boys♥Girls is the final single in Japanese singer-songwriter Koda Kumi's 12 Singles Collection. It was only one of three in the collection to not be limited to 50,000 and, due to this, sold over 89,413 copies.

Each single in the 12 Singles Collection had unique cover art based on certain cultures in various countries. The back cover of each single was a piece to a puzzle, which could only be completed by purchasing all twelve singles. The same was done for the obi strips, which contained a full image when arranged together in order. However, the obi strip image was omitted on the Hong Kong versions.

The a-side, "Someday", was used as the theme song for the third season of Shin Kyoto Meikyuu Annai (新・京都迷宮案内 / The New Guide to the Labyrinth of Kyoto). The song is the last song in the story-line music videos, which brings the stories from "Candy," "you," "feel" and "Lies" to a close.

"Boys♥Girls" was used as the theme for the 2006 movie called Waters (known in Japan as ウォーターズ / Uoutaazu) – a romantic comedy that revolves around the story of Japanese men working at a host club. The movie features actors Shun Oguri, Toshinobu Matsuo, Takamasa Suga, Shingo Katsurayama, Yusuke Kirishima, Hiroyuki Hirayama, Ryoji Morimoto, Hitomi Manaka, Riko Narumi and Yoshio Harada.

== Boys♥Girls: Theme of Waters ==
Waters was released on March 11, 2006, under the Gaga Corporation and produced by Yu Hirose and Masashi Yagi. I

It featured several well-known actors, including Shun Oguri as Ryohei, Toshinobu Matsuo as Naoto and Riko Narumi as Chika. It was directed by Ryo Nishimura and produced by Yu Hirose and Masashi Yagi.

=== Plot ===
Waters focuses on seven young, attractive men in need of money, who audition for host positions at a bar called Dog Days. However, "hosts" at the bar have the job of entertaining female customers by flirting with them in hopes that they spend more money on alcohol. Each host came from a different background, including a street performer and a banker.

The drama in the film begins when they discover the bar's manager has stolen several of their deposits. Not wanting to see the men fail, the bar's owner gives up the bar to the men, so they are able to open their own "host club." The bar owner's granddaughter, played by Riko Narumi, help the men get started and teaches them how to properly run a business.

== Music video ==
The music video for the song became the finale in the story-line driven videos; the firsts being "Candy," "you," "Lies" and "feel."

"Someday" was the second in the story-line videos to start with Kumi, instead of with the three men in the bar. The first was "Candy," which had featured rapper Mr. Blistah. The video for "Someday" has Kumi singing about the personas she had split herself into, who had found love. The video shows the conclusion to "you," "Lies" and "feel," with each man meeting up with their lover to reconcile.

The love interests were played by Takashi Tsukamoto, Shogen Itokazu and Shugo Oshinari.

== Cover ==
Each cover of the 12 Singles Collection takes inspiration from countries and cultures from around the world. The cover to Someday/Boys♥Girls draws inspiration from Koda Kumi's own country, Japan, and represents the geishas in Japanese culture.

== Track listing ==
(Source)

CD
| No. | Title | Lyrics | Music | Arranger(s) | Length |
|---|---|---|---|---|---|
| 1. | "Someday" | Koda Kumi | tasuku | Egami Kotaro | 4:18 |
| 2. | "Boys♥Girls" | Michikawa Himari | Hitoshi Shimono | Hitoshi Shimono | 4:10 |
| 3. | "Someday" (Instrumental) | | tasuku | Egami Kotaro | 4:18 |
| 4. | "Boys♥Girls" (Instrumental) | | Hitoshi Shimono | Hitoshi Shimono | 4:07 |

== Charts ==
=== Weekly charts ===
| Chart (2006) | Peak position |
|---|---|
| Japan (Oricon) | 3 |

=== Monthly charts ===
| Chart (2006) | Peak position |
|---|---|
| Japan (Oricon) | 9 |

=== Year-end charts ===
| Chart (2006) | Position |
|---|---|
| Japan (Oricon) | 110 |

== Certifications ==
| Region | Certification | Certified units/sales |
|---|---|---|
| Japan (RIAJ) | Gold | 100,000^{^} |
Digital downloads (Note: "Someday" as a stand-alone track.)
| Japan (RIAJ) Ringtone | 3× Platinum | 750,000^{*} |
| Japan (RIAJ) Ringtone full | Platinum | 250,000^{*} |
^{*} Sales figures based on certification alone.^{^} Shipments figures based on certification alone.

== Alternate Versions ==
Currently, there are five renditions of "Someday":

1. "Someday": Found on the single and corresponding album Best ~second session~ (2006)
2. "Someday (Instrumental)": Found on the single (2006)
3. "Someday (R. Yamaki's Groove Mix)": Found on Koda Kumi Remix Album (2006)
4. "Someday (Big Boy Remix)": Found on Koda Kumi Driving Hit's 5 (2013)
5. "Someday (litefeet Remix)": Found on Koda Kumi Driving Hit's 9 -Special Edition- (2019)
