= Tatsuya Ishii =

Japanese musician (born 1959)

- Also known as: Carl Smoky Ishii
- Born: September 22, 1959 (age 66)
- Origin: Ibaraki, Japan
- Genres: Pop
- Occupations: Singer-songwriter, artist, industrial designer
- Years active: 1985–present
- Labels: Sony Music Japan
- Formerly of: Kome Kome Club
- Website: t-stone.com

YouTube information
- Channel: 石井竜也 Official YouTube Music Channel
- Years active: 2021 -
- Subscribers: 6.51 thousand
- Views: 457 thousand
- Last updated: January 15, 2024

Tatsuya Ishii (石井竜也, Ishii Tatsuya), also known as Tatuya Ishii (born September 22, 1959) is a Japanese singer-songwriter, artist, and industrial designer from Ibaraki Prefecture.

== Biography ==
In 1985, he debuted as vocalist in the band Kome Kome CLUB (米米CLUB, Kome Kome CLUB). In 1992, their single "Kimi ga Iru Dake de" (君がいるだけで, Kimi ga Iru Dake de) won the Japanese record first prize. After Kome Kome Club's breakup in 1997, he began a solo career. His first solo single was released in 1997. To date, he has released 20 singles and 12 albums in his solo career. He has written and produced numerous songs for special events in Japan.

In addition to his musical career, Ishii has executed a number of different projects, including acting as the spatial coordinator for HEP Five, coordination producer for the "Suzuka 8-Hour Endurance Races", the producer of "The Forest Fairy's Ball" for Expo 2005, and recently the producer of "Ground Angel in Hiroshima", an event commemorating the 60th anniversary of the Hiroshima bombing. He has held private art exhibitions such as "Daydream Art Gallery" in 1997, and in 1999, "Expo Ishii 1999 Show Ten". Ishii also acts as a radio personality for FM Yokohama on his weekly radio show Yokohami. As an industrial designer, he has managed many designs for items like PCs and accessories, tableware, furniture, and often produces the costumes and stages for his concerts. He is also a writer, and has written numerous books. He had a monthly magazine publication that ran for two years called Monthly Ishii Wideshow (月刊石井 WIDESHOW, Gekkan Ishii WIDESHOW).

Alongside his many artistic talents, Ishii has also produced two films, ACRI ~The Legend of Homo-Aquarellius (1996) and Kappa (1994). In addition to producing ACRI, Ishii teamed up with artists Char and Ariga Nobuo to produce a soundtrack for the movie, under the band name ACRI.

Ishii's song "River" also was used as the second ending to the anime Mobile Suit Gundam Seed.

== Discography ==
=== Studio albums ===
Title	Album details	Peak chart positions
Title	Album details	JPN Oricon
H	Released: 21 March 1998; Label: Sony Music; Formats: CD, digital download, streaming	22
Deep	Released: 21 January 1999; Label: Sony Music; Formats: CD, digital download, streaming	10
Guy	Released: 29 March 2000; Label: Sony Music; Formats: CD, digital download, streaming	20
Roman (浪漫)	Released: 27 March 2002; Label: Sony Music; Formats: CD, digital download, streaming	20
Theater	Released: 19 September 2002; Label: Sony Music; Formats: CD, digital download, streaming	22
Nipops	Released: 23 April 2003; Label: Sony Music; Formats: CD, digital download, streaming	34
Hane (羽): released as T.I. Grand Project	Released: 3 December 2003; Label: Sony Music; Formats: CD, digital download, streaming	51
Nylon King	Released: 23 April 2004; Label: Sony Music; Formats: CD, digital download, streaming	39
Sketch	Released: 24 March 2005; Label: Sony Music; Formats: CD, digital download, streaming	50
Hidokei (日時計)	Released: 4 April 2007; Label: Sony Music; Formats: CD, digital download, streaming	51
Pendulum	Released: 26 March 2008; Label: Sony Music; Formats: CD, digital download, streaming	44
Chandelier	Released: 4 March 2009; Label: Sony Music; Formats: CD, digital download, streaming	45
Moon & Earth	Released: 9 March 2011; Label: Sony Music; Formats: CD, digital download, streaming	31
Love	Released: 5 September 2012; Label: Sony Music; Formats: CD, digital download, streaming	23
White Canvas	Released: 4 September 2013; Label: Sony Music; Formats: CD, digital download, streaming	26
Shine	Released: 3 September 2014; Label: Sony Music; Formats: CD, digital download, streaming	28
Stone	Released: 2 September 2015; Label: Sony Music; Formats: CD, digital download, streaming	23
Black Diamond	Released: 31 August 2016; Label: Sony Music; Formats: CD, digital download, streaming	23
Diamond Memories	Released: 27 September 2017; Label: Sony Music; Formats: CD, digital download, streaming	35
Love Diamonds	Released: 27 September 2019; Label: Sony Music; Formats: CD, digital download, streaming	45
Touchable	Released: 12 February 2020; Label: Sony Music; Formats: CD, digital download, streaming	28
Lost Message	Released: 7 September 2022; Label: Sony Music; Formats: CD, digital download, streaming	31
Deeper	Released: 20 December 2023; Label: Sony Music; Formats: CD, digital download, streaming	36
Lost Message: Chaos	Released: 29 May 2024; Label: Sony Music; Formats: CD, digital download, streaming	26
Stone Rock's	Released: 25 December 2024; Label: Sony Music; Formats: 2×CD, digital download, streaming	43
Lost Message: Reborn	Released: 16 April 2025; Label: Sony Music; Formats: CD, digital download, streaming	31

=== EPS ===
Title	Album details	Peak chart positions
Title	Album details	JPN Oricon
Dance Nylon	Released: 8 February 2006; Label: Sony Music; Formats: CD, digital download, streaming	39
Heart Voices	Released: 20 June 2012; Label: Sony Music; Formats: CD, digital download, streaming	31

=== Compilation albums ===
Title	Album details	Peak chart positions
Title	Album details	JPN Oricon
Ishi: Best of Best (石 〜Best of Best〜)	Released: 12 October 2005; Label: Sony Music; Formats: CD, digital download, streaming	18
Ishi Ni: Best of Best (石弐 〜Best of Best〜)	Released: 25 March 2015; Label: Sony Music; Formats: CD, digital download, streaming	34

=== Singles ===
Year	Album	Chart positions (JP)	Label
1997	"White Moon in the Blue Sky"	12	Sony Music
1998	"Rhythm/Kaerou: You Are My Place" (リズム/帰ろう 〜you are my place〜)	32	Sony Music
1998	"Anshin Shiroyo" (安心しろよ)	37	Sony Music
1998	"Hana Matsuri" (花まつり)	35	Sony Music
1998	"Hi Tension Love"	28	Sony Music
1999	"Ashita ni Tsuzuku Michi" (朝日につづく道)	36	Sony Music
2000	"Golden Fish & Silver Fox"	40	Sony Music
2001	"Tōku e" (遠くへ…)	14	Sony Music
2002	"Anata ni" (あなたに)	20	Sony Music
2002	"Koukai" (コ・ウ・カ・イ)	22	Sony Music
2002	"Kimi wo Tsurete" (君をつれて)	30	Sony Music
2003	"Yume no Mayoi Michi de/Silhouette Romance" (夢の迷い道で/シルエット・ロマンス)	36	Sony Music
2003	"River/Mizuiro no Ame" (RIVER/みずいろの雨)	40	Sony Music
2003	"River: Gundam Seed Edition"	22	Sony Music
2003	"Ground Angel"	62	Sony Music
2004	"Mirai: Mada Minu Jidai yo" (未来〜まだ見ぬ時代よ〜)	52	Sony Music
2004	"Kimi wa Rambadanbamba" (君はランバダンバンバ)	52	Sony Music
2005	"Kokoro no Kotoba" (心の言葉)	52	Sony Music
2005	"Ai no Chikara" (愛の力)	75	Sony Music
2005	"Ground Angel in Hiroshima"	101	Sony Music
2007	"Kimi ni Modorou/Kumo" (君に戻ろう/雲)	30	Sony Music
2008	"Tabi no Tochuu de" (旅の途中で)	46	Sony Music
2008	"Aira no Daichi" (AIRAの大地)	43	Sony Music
2009	"Dance in Love"	33	Sony Music
2010	"Ocean Drive" (featuring K)	37	Sony Music
2010	"The Wave of Love" (featuring ANRI)	44	Sony Music
2010	"Walking" (featuring Peabo Bryson)	38	Sony Music
2011	"Hana Hitohira" (はなひとひら)	46	Sony Music
2011	"Where Is Heaven"	52	Sony Music
2015	"Tobe-Jump-Show" (飛〜JUMP〜翔)	44	Sony Music

==== Collaboration singles ====
Year	Album	Chart positions (JP)	Label
1992	"Kaze no Komori Uta: Ashita no Kimi e" (愛のWAVE): with Yumi Matsutoya	1	Toshiba Emi
2002	"Moon Dancer": with Asato Shizuki	49	Sony Records
2006	"Kamen": with Koda Kumi	3	Rhythm Zone
2008	"Mahou no Kagami: The Dream Goes On" (魔法の鍵〜The Dream Goes On): with Satomi Takasugi	13	Walt Disney
2012	"Kaze no Komori Uta: Ashita no Kimi e" (風の子守歌 〜あしたの君へ〜): with Shinji Tanimura	54	Avex Io
2014	"Wakaretemo Suki na Hito" (別れても好きな人): with Ayame Goriki & Tokyo Del Amigo	8	Sony Music Records
2024	Marine Blue Memories: with Anri		Sony Music Records

== Videography ==
=== Video albums ===
No.	Release	Title	Serial No.+Formats
1st	20 June 1998	Drag-On Films: The Legend of Dragon Slayers	SRVM-5632
2nd	8 September 1999	Trans Films	SRVM-5666
3rd	21 January 2000	The Circus Films Circus Shonen Dan Natsu no Yo no Yume	SRVM-5675
4th	1 April 2000	Space Hawaiian Films	SRVM-5687
5th	18 October 2000	Dragasian Films	SRVM-5708（VHS） SRBL-1093（DVD）
6th	4 December 2002	A.N: Complete "Art Nude" DVD Box	SRBL-1155/8
7th	5 March 2003	Zero Cube: Complete "Zero City" DVD Box	SRBL-1173/4
8th	26 March 2003	Art Nude 1998	SRBL-1176
9th	26 March 2003	Art Nude 1999	SRBL-1177
10th	26 March 2003	Art Nude 2000	SRBL-1178
11th	26 March 2003	Art Nude 2002	SRBL-1179
12th	26 March 2003	Zero City: HAL	SRBL-1180
13th	26 March 2003	Zero City: AQI	SRBL-1181
14th	24 July 2003	Nylon Club	SRBL-1191
15th	7 December 2005	2005 Two Tone Tour	SRBL-1270/1
16th	8 February 2006	Nylon Club Super Deluxe	SRBL-1273
17th	26 April 2006	Cocorock Forest Concert: Tōmei Mori no Yōsei	SRBL-1280
18th	31 May 2006	Ishyst	SRBL-1281
19th	28 June 2006	Sketch: Book of Ground Angel	SRBL-1283
20th	27 July 2006	Dance Nylon: Nylon Long Live de Aimaseu	SRBL-1285
21st	30 May 2007	Tatuya Ishii Symphony Dreams	SRBL-1321/3
22nd	2 July 2008	Pendulum	SRBL-1344
23rd	26 November 2008	TMusic Tree Live: Tsukihi no tō	SRBL-1384
24th	26 August 2009	Chandelier Scandal	SRBL-1397/8
25th	22 December 2010	Rin'ne shūgetsu in Yakushiji	SRBL-1449
26th	19 October 2011	Ingot	SRBL-1477/82
27th	21 December 2011	Moonlight Orchestra	SRBL-1511
28th	27 March 2013	Moonlight Dance Party	SRBL-1569
29th	26 March 2014	White Moonlight	SRBL-1610/2; SRBL-1613
30th	25 March 2015	Pegasus	SRBL-1652/3
31st	3 February 2016	Arrows Head	SRBL-1690/3
32nd	22 February 2017	Black Diamond Reflection	SRBL-1738
33rd	28 November 2018	Tatuya Ishii Concert Tour 2018: Jin	SRXL-190
34th	11 March 2020	Oh! Ishii Live	SRXL-231/2; SRBL-1890

=== Music videoclips ===
No.	Release	Title	Serial No.+Format
1st	20 February 1999	Troublemaker	SRVM-5642
2nd	19 April 2000	Pregasia	SRVM-5692（VHS） SRBL-1050（DVD）

=== Documentaries ===
No.	Release	Title	Serial No.+Format
1st	21 February 2001	Dragon Spirit Vol.1	SRVM-5721（VHS） SRBL-1119（DVD）
2nd	25 April 2001	Dragon Spirit Vol.2	SRVM-5724（VHS） SRBL-1122（DVD）
3rd	4 July 2001	Dragon Spirit Vol.3	SRVM-5729（VHS） SRBL-1125（DVD）

=== Directed movies ===
No.	Release	Title	Serial No.
1st	5 December 2007	Kappa	PCBP51613
2nd	5 December 2007	ACRI	PCBP51614

== Filmography ==
- Kyrie (2023)

== Television cameo ==
Tatsuya Ishii guest starred in the Canadian science fiction TV series Sanctuary; he briefly appears as the head of the Tokyo Sanctuary at the beginning of the Season 2 finale "Kali", which aired on SyFy on January 15, 2010. His character, Onryuji, head of the Tokyo Sanctuary, returned in two subsequent episodes, in Seasons 3 and 4.
