= Obi (publishing) =

Strip of paper containing information for media in some Asian countries

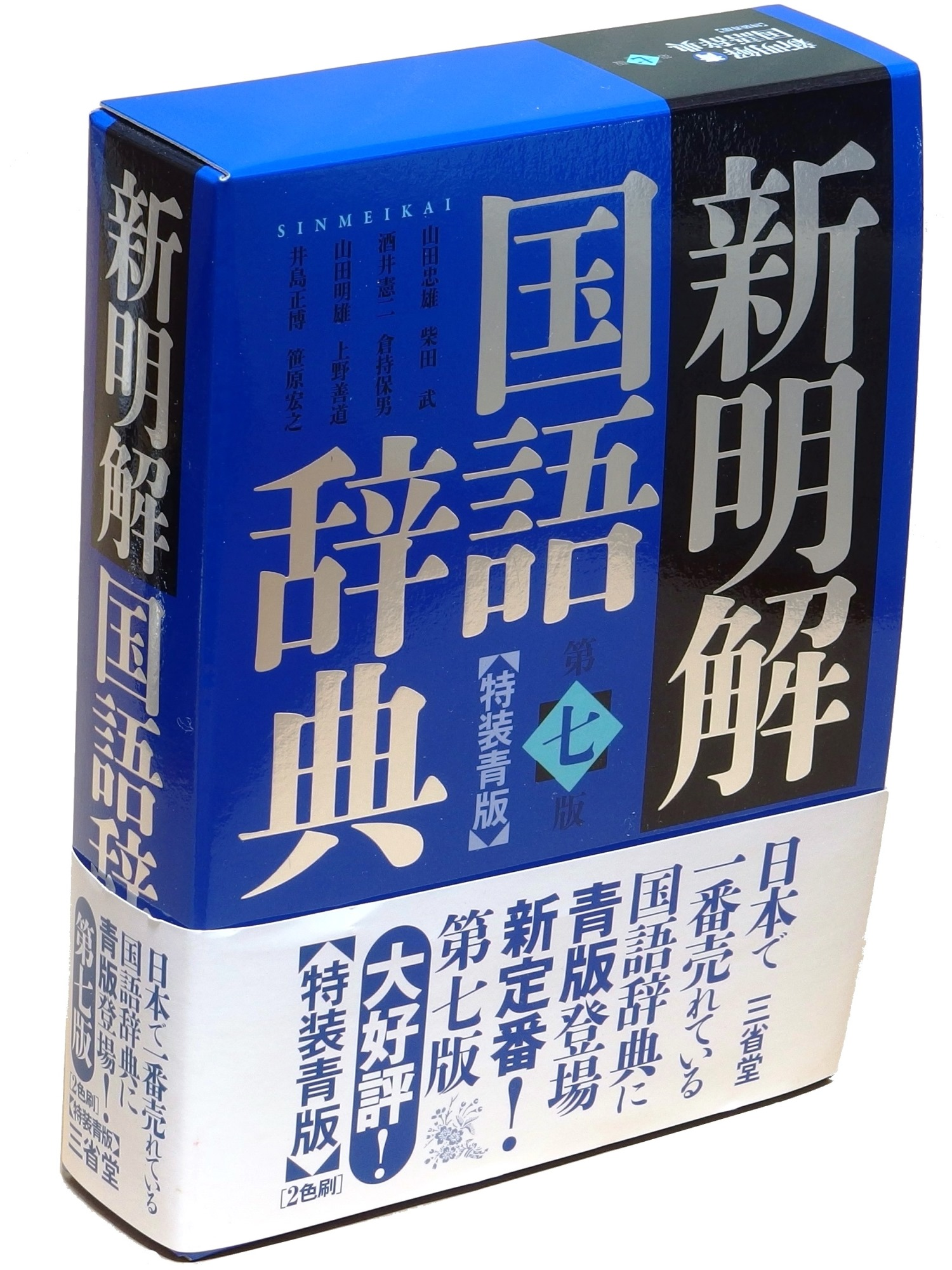
The Shinmeikai dictionary, with an obi strip along the bottom

An obi (Japanese: 帯) is a strip of paper looped around a book or other product. This extends the term obi used for Japanese clothing; it is written with the same kanji. It is also referred to as a tasuki (襷; another kimono accessory), or more narrowly as obigami (帯紙; "belt paper"). Obi are most commonly found on products in Asian countries, especially Japan.

== For books ==
Many books in Japan are supplied with an obi, which is normally added outside any dust jacket. However, a book in a slipcase may have an obi around the slipcase.

In English, the term belly-band is sometimes used instead. In French, the term bandeau is more frequently used.

== Other applications ==
The terms obi and tasuki are also used for a strip that is looped over one side (usually on the left) or folded over the top of (vinyl) LP albums released in Japan, and folded over the left side of music CDs, video games, LaserDiscs, or DVDs. In this particular context, those obi in cardboard are commonly called spine cards in English, particularly by collectors of Japanese editions.

With the exceptions of books where belly-bands are used to add marketing claims, obi were unique to Japan and are used to provide the title of the product, track listings (if applicable), price, catalog number and information on related releases in Japanese. Today, Japanese publishers also internationally release some collector's editions of video games with their obi. It is used by the consumer to determine what is included in the album or book, and the store can use the information for ordering. Obi are sometimes used on boxes for collectible toys and figures. Products with an obi have become popular with some collectors, as products with the obi intact can fetch premium prices and are collectible items in their own right. A secondhand record or CD with a still intact obi may be worth more than the same with the obi missing.

== See also ==
- Dust jacket
