= And (Koda Kumi album) =

AND

Studio album by Koda Kumi
- Released: February 28, 2018
- Recorded: 2017–2018
- Genre: Pop; electronic; R&B
- Label: Rhythm Zone
- Producer: Koda Kumi

Koda Kumi chronology
Koda Kumi Driving Hit's 7 (2017)	AND (2018)	Koda Kumi Driving Hit's 8 (2018)

Singles from And
- 1. "LIT" Released: August 2, 2017; 2. "Never Enough" Released: December 6, 2017

And (stylized in all caps) is the fourteenth studio album by Japanese singer-songwriter Koda Kumi, and the first of two planned albums released for 2018. The album was released on February 28, 2018, nearly one year after her previous studio album W Face.

AND was preceded by three singles: LIT, HUSH and Never Enough. However, despite being a single, the song "HUSH" did not make the final track list and, instead, would be placed on her second album of 2018, DNA. The version of "LIT" featured on the album was the same as in the music video, which omitted the outro that was featured on the single version.

The CD+DVD and CD+Blu-Ray editions featured the music video for "LIT," along with a dance version, an alternate version of "Never Enough," a music video for "Party" and a making film of the videos.

== Information ==
And (stylized as AND) is the fourteenth studio album by Japanese singer-songwriter Koda Kumi, and first of two planned albums for the year of 2018. The album was released nearly a year after her previous studio album W Face and remix album Driving Hit's 7. The album debuted at No. 2 on the Oricon Albums Charts, becoming her first album since secret (2005) to not debut at No. 1 (secret debuted at #3). By March 3, less than a week after the album's release, AND had dropped out of the top ten to No. 12, giving the album a weekly ranking at No. 6.

AND was released in four editions: a standard CD, a CD+DVD combo which housed four music videos and a making film, a CD+Blu-ray combo which housed higher quality versions of the music videos and making film, and a fan club exclusive CD+3DVD edition. The fan club edition carried two bonus DVDs, which held Kumi's favorite clips from her Live Tour 2017 ~W Face~ performances. For the album, only one new music video was produced – a video for "Party" (stylized as PARTY), which was used as the main promotional track for the album. On February 8, 2018, a short version of the video was uploaded avex's official YouTube to help promote the album.

Despite being a single, the song "HUSH" failed to make it to the album.

Prior to the album's release, Kumi had said how she had been taking voice lessons to improve her vocals for the new album – how she wanted to "be better at singing." This had been evidenced by her vocal range for the song "HUSH", which Kumi performed at a deeper vocal range than previously released songs.

Many of the songs for AND were performed using the style of electropop, a combination between electronica and pop. Kumi had previously worked with this musical genre for her songs "BUT" (2006) and "Pop Diva" (2010), and for her collaboration with Far☆East Movement for the song "Make It Bump" (2010). The only exceptions were the songs "LIT," which was pop, "Never Enough," which was a pop-infused ballad, and "Got Me Going'" (stylized as GOT ME GOING'), which was a blend of pop and jazz.

== Packaging ==
AND was released in four editions: a standard CD, a CD+DVD combo which housed four music videos and a making film, a CD+Blu-ray combo which housed higher quality versions of the music videos and making film, and a fan club exclusive CD+3DVD edition.

All editions carried the same ten tracks on the CD and the same music videos on the first DVD/Blu-ray. Along with the music video for "LIT," an alternate dance version of the video was placed on the album, as was an alternate version of "Never Enough." The original version of the latter track was only released on avex's official YouTube to help promote the single when it was released in December 2017, whereas the single was not given a CD+DVD edition. The DVD and Blu-rays did house one new music video for the song "Party," which was utilized as the album's main promotional track.

The two bonus DVDs that came with the limited fan club edition contained Koda Kumi's personal picks of songs she performed for her Live Tour 2017 ~W Face~ concerts, which ran for six months across Japan.

== Single: Never Enough ==
"Never Enough"

Single by Koda Kumi

from the album AND
- Released: December 6, 2017
- Recorded: 2017
- Genre: Pop
- Label: Rhythm Zone
- Producer(s): Koda Kumi

Koda Kumi singles chronology
"Hush" (2017)	"Never Enough" (2017)	"Eh Yo" (2019)

Never Enough (stylized as NEVER ENOUGH) is the 62nd single by Koda Kumi. The single was announced in October and was released on December 6, 2017. As with her prior singles, LIT and HUSH, it only garnered a physical release at concert venues, her official fan club and on the Japanese site mu-mo.

The single was her third and final release of three planned released for 2017, her first being LIT in August and HUSH in October. The song was included on her fourteenth studio album, AND, as was an alternate rendition of the music video. She would not release another single for two years, which would be the digital single Eh Yo in July 2019.

Never Enough was also released as a 12" vinyl.

She would not release another single for nearly two years, with the song "Eh Yo" in July 2019.

=== Information ===
Never Enough is the sixty-second single by Koda Kumi under the avex sub-label Rhythm Zone. The release was announced on October 31, and was her final single of her planned releases for the year of 2017, her first being LIT, which was released on August 2, and the second being HUSH, which was released on October 4. As with the previous singles, a physical release was only available at concert venues for Live Tour 2017 ~W Face~, her official fan club Koda Gumi and on the popular music site mu-mo. The CD was later made available on Amazon Japan. The single was also released as a 12-inch vinyl.

Due to having no physical release, the song failed to chart on the Oricon Singles Charts. The single was released as a CD and as a 12" vinyl; both versions contained the title track, along with its corresponding instrumental. It was given a limited release during the concert venues and each CD that was purchased through the venues carried one of five stickers. Those who purchased all three singles from the same official shop received a tote bag, which featured a different print depending on which shop all three singles were purchased from. For mu-mo, customers had to use the same login I.D to acquire the limited tote.

"Never Enough" was written and composed by multi-platinum songwriter and music producer Matthew Tishler, Philip Bentley and Aimée Proal, with the lyrical portion written by Kumi herself. Matthew is a songwriter who has worked in films, radio, stage and television. He is known for his work with American artists Ashley Tisdale, Olivia Holt, and Cymphonique, South Korean artists BoA, Tohoshinki and EXO, and Japanese artists Lead, Crystal Kay and Namie Amuro, among others. Singer and songwriter Aimée Proal is also well known for her works with Kelly Clarkson, Halestorm, and Christina Aguilera. Philip Bentley had previously worked with Koda Kumi for her song "Gimme U" from her Walk of My Life (2015) album.

=== Music video ===
The music video for "Never Enough" was in contrast to the previous brightly lit videos and, instead, was done in monochrome. It was performed in one continuous shot, much how her sister misono had done for several of her videos throughout her career. For the video, light and shadow were used to reflect on certain lines and themes. In one instance, in mention of the ocean, light is reflected in the room to resemble water, while during the more emotional parts, the room is drenched in darkness.

The video's off-shot gained fan support, due to the filming location and the meaning the song held to Koda Kumi's fans. On December 6, 2017, avex's official YouTube uploaded the music video to help promote the single.

On the corresponding album AND, an alternate version of the music video was used.

=== Track listing ===
CD
No.	Title	Lyrics	Music	Length
1.	"Never Enough"	Koda Kumi	Matthew Tishler • Philip Bentley • Aimée Proal	3:17
2.	"Never Enough" (Instrumental)		Matthew Tishler • Philip Bentley • Aimée Proal	3:17
Total length:				6:34

== Promotional advertisements ==
To help promote the album, the album-exclusive track "All Right" (track #7) was used as the tie-ins for the Japanese housing company Jutaku Johokan and as a promotional song for the city of Minamiawaji in the Hyōgo Prefecture.

"LIT" was used as the theme song to a spin-off of the fantasy MMORPG Dragon Nest, titled Serencia Saga: Dragon Nest (セレンシアサーガ：ドラゴンネスト). On the official site for Serencia Saga, an entire page was dedicated to Kumi's tie-in with the game.

== Track listing ==
All lyrics are written by Koda Kumi.

CD
No.	Title	Music	Arranger(s)	Length
1.	"Party"	Mike Tyler	Mike Tyler	3:21
2.	"Sweetest Taboo"	Anne Judith Wik • Ronny Vidar Svendsen • Hayley Michelle Harambašić • Jan Hallvard Larsen • Eirik Johansen • Hayley Aitken	Ronny Vidar Svendsen • Jan Hallvard Larsen • Eirik Johansen	3:20
3.	"Got Me Going'"	Paulo Mendonca • Jessie J • Curtis Richa	Paulo Mendonca • Jessie J • Curtis Richa	2:40
4.	"Who"	Joacim Persson • Sebastian Arman • Christopher Thornton • Diondria "Dria" Thornton	Joacim Persson • Sebastian Arman • Christopher Thornton • Diondria "Dria" Thornton	3:43
5.	"Outta My Head"	Shiloh • Fredrik "Fredro" Ödesjö	Shiloh • Fredrik "Fredro" Ödesjö
6.	"Never Enough"	Matthew Tishler • Philip Bentley • Aimée Proal	Matthew Tishler • Philip Bentley • Aimée Proal	3:17
7.	"All Right"	Hi-Yunk	Hi-Yunk	4:05
8.	"LIT"	Hi-Yunk	Hi-Yunk	3:10
9.	"Brain"	Johan Nybaeck • Emelie Sederholm • Raja Kumari	Johan Nybaeck • Emelie Sederholm • Raja Kumari	2:32
10.	"It's My Life"	Fujimoto Kazunori	Fujimoto Kazunori	3:38

DVD/Blu-Ray
No.	Title	Length
1.	"LIT" (Music Video)
2.	"LIT -Dance Version-" (Music Video)
3.	"Never Enough -Special Version-" (Music Video)
4.	"Party" (Music Video)
5.	"Making Movie"

FC Limited Edition DVD2: Live Tour 2017 ~W FACE~
No.	Title	Length
1.	"Stand by you" (Fukushima Prefectural Culture Center 2017.04.08)
2.	"Taboo" (NHK Hall 2017.04.12)
3.	"Pop Diva" (NHK Hall 2017.04.13)
4.	"What's Up" (Nagoya Congress Center 2017.04.15)
5.	"Stand by you" (Nagoya Congress Center 2017.04.16)
6.	"Bassline" (Takamatsu Cultural Hall 2017.04.22)
7.	"LOADED feat. Sean Paul" (Naruto Cultural Hall 2017.04.23)
8.	"Bassline" (Nitori Culture Hall 2017.04.29)
9.	"Comes Up" (Nitori Culture Hall 2017.04.30)
10.	"Ai no Uta" (Iichiko Grand Theatre 2017.05.03)
11.	"Heartless" (Fukuoka Sunpalace 2017.05.05)
12.	"Bridget Song" (Fukuoka Sunpalace 2017.05.06)
13.	"Ai no Uta" (Kanagawa Kenmin Hall 2017.05.10)
14.	"Bring It On" (Orix Theater 2017.05.13)
15.	"What's Up" (Orix Theater 2017.05.14)
16.	"walk" (Hiroshima City Cultural Exchange Hall 2017.05.19)
17.	"Yorokobi no Kakera" (Kurashiki Shimin Kaikan 2017.05.21)
18.	"Ultraviolet" (Sendai Sun Plaza 2017.05.27)
19.	"Bassline" (Link Station Hall Aomori 2017.05.28)
20.	"Inside" (Shizuoka Citizen's Cultural Hall 2007.06.03)
21.	"Pop Diva" (Shizuoka Citizen's Cultural Hall 2007.06.04)
22.	"Hotel" (Orix Theater 2017.06.10)
23.	"Bring It On" (Orix Theater 2017.06.11)
24.	"Pop Diva" (ROHM Theatre Kyoto 2017.06.17)
25.	"Stand by you" (ROHM Theatre Kyoto 2017.06.18)
26.	"LOADED feat. Sean Paul" (Beycia Cultural Hall / Gunma 2017.06.23)
27.	"On My Way" (Yamanashi Colany Cultural Hall 2017.06.24)
28.	"Comes Up" (Nara Centennial Hall 2017.06.30)
29.	"Sukideshite" (Wakayama Prefecture Culture Hall 2017.07.01)

FC Limited Edition DVD3: Live Tour 2017 ~W FACE~
No.	Title	Length
1.	"MPC PLAYING – DANCER INTRODUCTION" (Kochi Prefectural Culture Hall 2017.07.08)
2.	"Taboo" (Tochigi Prefectural Culture Center 2017.07.13)
3.	"LOADED feat. Sean Paul" (Ichihara Shimin Kaikan 2017.07.14)
4.	"Sukideshite" (Shiga Biwako Hall 2017.07.16)
5.	"Heartless" (Fukui Phoenix Plaza 2017.07.17)
6.	"Sukideshite" (Omiya Sonic City 2017.07.20)
7.	"Pop Diva" (Kurayoshi Park Square 2017.07.22)
8.	"Hotel" (Honda no Mori Hall 2017.07.29)
9.	"Bring It On" (Toyama Overdoor Hall 2017.07.30)
10.	"Insane" (Niigata Prefectural Civic Center 2017.08.11)
11.	"Ultraviolet" (Akita Prefectural Hall 2017.08.13)
12.	"Taboo" (Morioka Civic Cultural Hall 2017.08.26)
13.	"Sukideshite" (Yamagin Hall 2017.08.27)
14.	"Taboo" (Ibaraki Prefectural Culture Hall 2017.08.31)
15.	"Bridget Song" (Shunan Cultural Hall 2017.09.02)
16.	"What's Up" (Shimane Cultural Hall 2017.09.03)
17.	"Insane" (Mie Prefecture Fine Arts Center 2017.09.09)
18.	"Taboo" (Nagaragawa Convention Center 2017.09.10)
19.	"Damn real" (Saga City Cultural Hall 2017.09.16)
20.	"Bridget Song" (Miyazaki Prefectural Cultural Hall 2017.09.18)
21.	"LOADED feat. Sean Paul" (Kobe International Conference Centre 2017.09.22)
22.	"LIT" (Kobe International Conference Centre 2017.09.23)
23.	"Bassline" (Hokuto Cultural Hall 2017.10.01)
24.	"Stand by you" (Hamamatsu Great Hall 2017.10.05)
25.	"Promise you" (Matsuyama Civic Hall 2017.10.07)
26.	"Be My Baby" (Nagasaki Brick Hall 2017.10.09)
27.	"Comes Up" (Kumamoto Prefectural Theater 2017.10.10)
28.	"Heartless" (Kagoshima Citizens' Cultural Hall 2017.10.21)

== Oricon Sales Chart (Japan) ==
Release	Chart	Peak position	Debut sales	Sales total
February 28, 2018	Oricon Daily Charts	2	9,858	18,946
February 28, 2018	Weekly Chart	6	14,538	18,946
February 28, 2018	Monthly Chart	22	18,050	18,946
February 28, 2018	Yearly Chart	250	18,946	18,946
