= Wings (EP) =

EP by Koda Kumi
- Released: January 18, 2023
- Recorded: 2022–2023
- Genre: J-pop; R&B
- Label: Rhythm Zone

Koda Kumi chronology
Angel + Monster (2020)	Wings (2023)

Wings is an extended play by Japanese artist Koda Kumi, released on January 18, 2023. It was released in four editions—two for public release and two exclusive to her official fan club. The EP debuted at No. 5 on the Oricon Albums Chart.

== Information ==
Wings is the seventh EP by Japanese artist Koda Kumi, released on January 18, 2023. It is her seventh official EP, her last being Angel + Monster, which was released in 2019 - the extended plays from her Fever series excluded. The EP debuted at No. 5 on the daily Oricon albums chart. It dropped in ranking throughout the week, though remained in the top 10 at No. 10 with a total of 4,340 units sold.

The EP was released in four editions. A CD+DVD and CD+Blu-ray were released to the public, while a limited CD+2DVD and CD+Blu-ray was released to her fan club Koda Gumi. The edition released to the public housed five tracks on the CD and an edited version of her Premium Symphonic Concert 2022 performance for Billboard Classics that was held at Festival Hall, Osaka on June 18, 2022. The fan club editions contained the entire performance on the first DVD and the music videos for the tracks "Wings" and "Trigger".

== Promotional activities ==
The title track, "Wings", was originally released as a digital single on August 31, 2022. It was utilized as the theme song for the Ikemen game series All for Love!. A special music video made for the game was released two months prior on July 1, 2022 on the series' official YouTube.

Kumi performed the song during her 21st→22nd Anniversary Event Live at Tokyo Dome City Hall on December 6, 2022.

== Music videos ==
Of the five tracks on the EP, two received music videos: "Wings" and "Trigger".

"Wings" opens as a bird flies through clouds before shifting focus to Koda Kumi descending stairs from the sky. As the song progresses, wings continued to grow larger on her back. At the end of the video, the wings have grown to their full size. It then cuts back to the bird flying from the opening. The music video was uploaded to Koda Kumi's official YouTube on January 17, 2023.

"Trigger" carries a darker theme, opening with a shot of the sky before shifting to the ground. It then focuses on Koda Kumi with black wings, lying on the ground as though she had fallen from the heavens. The video cuts to several edits of her dancing and clawing at the dirt on the ground. It ends with the sun rising and Kumi, still donning black wings, standing before disappearing into a cloud of black smoke. It then cuts to the opening of "Wings." The official music video was uploaded the same day as "Wings" on January 17, 2023.

== Track listing ==
Wings track listing
No.	Title	Lyrics	Music	Composer(s)	Length
1.	"Wings"	Koda Kumi	Koda Kumi • Hi-yunk • Hiroki (SLAY)	Hi-yunk • Hiroki (SLAY)	4:21
2.	"Hello Yesterday"	Koda Kumi	Hi-yunk	Hi-yunk	4:34
3.	"Black Wings" (Interlude)	Koda Kumi	Hi-yunk	Hi-yunk	0:58
4.	"Trigger"	Koda Kumi	Mehi June • Ori.G.n	Mehi June • Ori.G.n	3:21
5.	"Heaven Tonight"	Koda Kumi • Young Yazzy	CHIVA • Young Yazzy	CHIVA • Young Yazzy	3:13
6.	"It's "K" Magic"	Koda Kumi	Scott Russell Stoddart • Valeria Del Prete	Scott Russell Stoddart • Valeria Del Prete	3:21
Total length:					19:48

DVD: Billboard Classics Koda Kumi Premium Symphonic Concert 2022 (Edit Ver.)
No.	Title	Length
1.	"Bow Wow"	5:21
2.	"Ai no Uta"	5:48
3.	"100 no Kodokutachi e"	6:43
4.	"Koi no Tsubomi" (A Cup of Milk Tea Bossa Nova Version)	5:16
5.	"You"	5:45
6.	"Walk of My Life"	4:28
7.	"You're So Beautiful"	4:29
8.	"Butterfly"	5:19
Total length:		43:09

=== Fan club track listing ===
DVD1: Billboard Classics Koda Kumi Premium Symphonic Concert 2022
No.	Title	Length
1.	"Bow Wow"	5:21
2.	"Taboo"	10:13
3.	"Bassline"	5:49
4.	"Swallowtail Butterfly ~Ai no Uta~"	5:03
5.	"Ai no Uta"	5:48
6.	"100 no Kodokutachi e"	6:43
7.	"No Me Without You"	5:40
8.	"Koi no Tsubomi" (Cup of Milk Tea Bossa Nova Version)	5:16
9.	"Someday"	7:16
10.	"1000 no Kotoba"	6:40
11.	"You"	5:45
12.	"Walk of My Life"	4:28
13.	"You're So Beautiful"	4:29
14.	"Butterfly"	12:40
15.	"Alive"	4:03
16.	"Through the Sky"	9:23
Total length:		104:49

DVD2: Music Videos
No.	Title	Length
1.	"Wings" (music video)	4:27
2.	"Trigger" (music video)	3:21
3.	"Wings" (Behind the Scenes)	65:41
Total length:		73:29

== Charts ==
Weekly chart performance for Wings
Chart (2023)	Weekly position	Total sales
Japanese Albums (Oricon)	10	4,340
Japanese Digital Albums (Oricon)	28	
Japanese Hot Albums (Billboard Japan)	12	
