= Live Tour 2018: DNA =

Live Tour 2018 ~DNA~

Video by Koda Kumi
- Released: March 20, 2019
- Recorded: 2018
- Genre: Pop, R&B, J-pop, dance-pop, rock, hip-hop
- Label: Rhythm Zone; DVD (RZBD-86808); Blu-ray (RZXD-86809); 2CD [Limited] (RZC1-86815~6); 4DVD [Limited] (RZB1-86810～3)
- Producer: Koda Kumi

Koda Kumi chronology
Live Tour 2017: W Face (2017)	Live Tour 2018; ~DNA~ (2019)	Live Tour 2019 Re(live): Black Cherry (2019)

Koda Kumi Live Tour 2018 ~DNA~ (stylized as KODA KUMI LIVE TOUR 2018 ~DNA~) is a live concert DVD by Japanese singer-songwriter Koda Kumi, and coincides with her studio album DNA. The DVD was released on March 20, 2019. It peaked at No. 2 on the Oricon live charts and remained on the charts for seven weeks.

The concert was released for purchase on Blu-ray and DVD, a limited 2CD audio edition, and a limited 4DVD edition.

== Information ==
Live Tour 2018 ~DNA~ is the eighteenth live DVD/Blu-ray released by Japanese recording artist Koda Kumi. The tour coincided with her fifteenth studio album, DNA. The tour began on September 14, 2018, at the Fukuoka Sunpalace and ended with a performance at Kagawa Prefecture Rexxam Hall on December 29, 2018. The DVD charted at No. 2 on the Oricon DVD Charts, and stayed on the charts for seven weeks; while the Blu-ray took the No. 37 spot on the Oricon Blu-ray Charts, and remained on the charts for two weeks.

The live was released on DVD, a higher quality Blu-ray edition, and limited fanclub exclusive 2CD and 4DVD editions. The limited fan club 4DVD edition not only featured bonus content from the DNA tour, but also featured her Fanclub Tour 2018 ~AND~ (which coincided with her studio album AND) performance that was held at Zepp DiverCity in Tokyo on June 9, 2018.

The performance utilized on the DVD and Blu-ray was of the concert performed at the Kanagawa Prefectural Hall on Kumi's 36th birthday on November 13, 2018.

Prior to the tour DVD/Blu-ray release, the concert was screened with the title Theatrical Koda Kumi Live Tour 2018 ~DNA~ between March 8–10 at AEON Cinemas throughout the country.

== Track listing ==
=== 4DVD ===
- DVD1: Live Tour 2018 ~DNA~ at Kanagawa Kenmin Hall~

<OPENING>

1. "Dangerous"
2. "Pin Drop"
3. "Is This Trap?" / "Ecstasy" / "Taboo"
4. "Haircut"
5. "HOT HOT"
  <INTERLUDE>
  <DANCERS IN ACTION>
6. "Aenaku Naru Kurai Nara"
7. "Ai no Uta"
8. "Koi no Tsubomi" / "I'll be there" / "Someday"
9. "Chances All"
10. "Never Enough"
11. "Outta My Head"
  <DANCERS INTRODUCTION>
12. "Watch Out!! ~DNA~"
13. "ScREaM"
14. "Hush"
15. "Guess Who Is Back"
16. "Ultraviolet"
17. "Party"
18. "LIT"
  <Encore>
19. "Lady Go!":
20. "Megumi no Hito"
21. "Work That"
22. "Wind"
23. "Walk"
- DVD2: Fanclub Tour ~AND~ at Zepp DiverCity
1. "It's My Life"
2. "Universe"
3. "Sweetest Taboo"
4. "Selfish"
  <MC>
5. "Who"
6. "Brain"
7. "Got Me Going'"
  <MC>
8. "Sometimes Dreams Come True"
  <MC>
9. "Just The Way You Are" / "flower"
10. "All Right"
  <MC>
  <DANCERS & BAND INTRODUCTION>
11. "Freaky"
12. "Hot Stuff feat. KM-MARKIT"
13. "Megumi no Hito"
14. "Party"
15. "LIT"
- DVD3: Live Tour 2018 ~DNA~ [Making Film]
1. "Behind The Scenes Video"
2. "Kumi's Everyday Clothes"
3. "A Birthday Surprise"
- DVD4: Live Tour 2018 ~DNA~ [Bonus Footage]

<Century Hall Nagoya Congress Center (2018.12.23)

1. "Winter Bell"
2. "Koi no Tsubomi"
3. "I'll be there"
4. "Someday"
5. "Chances All"

<Century Hall Nagoya Congress Center (2018.12.24)>

1. "Winter Bell"
2. "Koi no Tsubomi"
3. "Someday"
4. "Chances All"
5. "Never Enough"

<Grand Cube Osaka (2018.12.31)>

1. "Cutie Honey"
2. "D.D.D."
3. "LOADED feat. Sean Paul"
4. "walk"
5. "Universe"
6. "Pop Diva"

=== 2CD ===
CD1
No.	Title	Length
1.	"Dangerous"
2.	"Pin Drop"
3.	"Is This Trap? / Ecstasy / Taboo"
4.	"Haircut"
5.	"Hot Hot"
6.	"Aenaku Naru Kurai Nara"
7.	"Ai no Uta"
8.	"Koi no Tsubomi / I'll be there / Someday"
9.	"Chances All"
10.	"Never Enough"
11.	"Outta My Head"

CD2
No.	Title	Length
1.	"Watch Out!! ~DNA~"
2.	"ScREaM"
3.	"Hush"
4.	"Guess Who is Back"
5.	"Ultraviolet"
6.	"Party"
7.	"Lit"
8.	"Lady Go!"
9.	"Megumi no Hito"
10.	"Work That"
11.	"Wind"
12.	"walk"

== Charts (Japan) ==
Release	Chart	Peak position
March 20, 2019	Oricon DVD Chart	2
March 20, 2019	Oricon Blu-ray Chart	37
