= DNA (Koda Kumi album) =

Studio album by Koda Kumi
- Released: August 22, 2018
- Recorded: 2017–2018
- Genre: J-pop; urban; R&B; electropop
- Label: Rhythm Zone
- Producer: Koda Kumi

Koda Kumi chronology
Koda Kumi Driving Hit's 8 (2018)	DNA (2018)	Koda Kumi Driving Hit's 9 -Special Edition- (2019)

Singles from DNA
- 1. "HUSH" Released: October 4, 2017

DNA is the fifteenth studio album by the Japanese singer Koda Kumi, released on August 22, 2018, six months after her previous studio album, AND, making it her second album of 2018.

DNA has thirteen musical tracks on the CD, four music videos on the DVD/Blu-ray, the performance of her Fanclub Tour ~AND~ at DRUM LOGOS in Fukuoka, which was performed on April 29, 2018, on the second DVD, and the behind-the-scenes of the tour and making of the album DNA on the third DVD.

== Information ==
The album debuted at No. 2 on the Oricon Albums Charts, taking No. 3 for the week, becoming her second consecutive album to not reach the number-one spot (AND charted at #6). Kumi had held the number-one position with every studio and compilation album between 2005 and 2017, beginning with Best ~first things~ (2005) and ending with the double-album W Face (2017).

Unlike AND, which had a fun and upbeat style, DNA was made to be darker and toned down. This was most obvious in the album's artwork, in which Kumi dons more muted attire.

The album was preceded by three singles: "LIT", "HUSH" and "Never Enough". However, "LIT" and "Never Enough" were placed on the album AND and "HUSH" was the only song placed on DNA.

The CD contained twelve new tracks, along with the previously released song "HUSH"; the first DVD and Blu-ray contained the corresponding music videos for "HUSH" and three new songs "Watch Out!! ~DNA~" (stylized as WATCH OUT!! ~DNA~), "Haircut" (stylized as HAIRCUT) and "Chances All" (stylized as CHANCES ALL). The second and third DVD were only released on the CD+3DVD fan club edition. The second DVD had her April 29 performance of her Fanclub Tour ~AND~ at DRUM LOGOS in Fukuoka, while the third DVD carried behind-the-scenes footage of the tour and the making film for DNA. Her Zepp Tokyo performance of Fanclub Tour ~AND~ would later be placed on the second DVD of her fan club edition of Live Tour 2018 ~DNA~ (2019).

== Promotional advertisements ==
HUSH was announced on September 9, 2017, and was her second single of the three planned releases for the year of 2017 – LIT being the first and Never Enough being the third. Due to having no physical release outside of concert venues, the song failed to chart on the Oricon Singles Charts. "HUSH" was a hip-hop piece composed by Swedish musical composer and songwriter Louise Frick-Sveen, who had previously worked with South Korean group SF9 for their song "Fanfare" in July along with Albin Nordqvist. The lyrics to "HUSH" were written by Kumi and TEEDA from the group Back-On.

The song "Guess Who Is Back" (track #9) was used as the 4th theme song for the 1st season of the anime Black Clover. This made it the first time since 2012 that Kumi performed a theme song for an anime, the previous being "Go to the top" for the anime Muv-Luv Alternative: Total Eclipse.

== Music videos ==
Along with the music video for "Hush", three new videos were created and performed for the album: "Watch Out!! ~DNA~", "Haircut" and "Chances All". The three new videos were performed in the same location, with "Haircut" being the main promotional track.

The video for "Haircut" opened with the first few seconds of the album's first track, "Introduction ~My music is designed from my DNA~". It shows Kumi with blonde hair as she makes her way to a stylist's station, where they dye her hair in rainbow colors. After she gets up, she walks behind promotional posters for the DNA album as her hair changes. In the video, she has several hairstyles, including platinum blonde pigtails with butterflies, before she unveils her current hairstyle of a blonde bob cut. Other scenes in the video include Kumi spray painting a wall while wearing neon boots and a black swimsuit. The video ends with Kumi cutting her hair with scissors, which began the video for "Watch Out!! ~DNA~".

"Watch Out!! ~DNA~" was performed in the same location, with Kumi wearing a neon yellow raincoat over a black jumpsuit. The video was predominately a dance number, with Kumi and four background dancers. "Chances All" was composed of the multiple hairstyles she wore in the video for "Haircut", with Kumi singing directly to the camera.

Short versions of all three new videos were uploaded to avex's official YouTube on August 9, 2018, to help promote the album.

== Track listing ==
CD
No.	Title	Lyrics	Music	Length
1.	"Introduction ~My music is designed from my DNA~"	Koda Kumi	Bobby Conscious	1:27
2.	"HUSH"	Koda Kumi • TEEDA	Louise Frick-Sveen • Albin Nordqvist	3:50
3.	"Dangerous"	Koda Kumi	Koda Kumi • Hi-Yunk	3:57
4.	"Watch Out!! ~DNA~"	Koda Kumi	Hi-Yunk	3:03
5.	"ScREaM"	Koda Kumi	Mayu Wakisaka, Mitsu J	3:44
6.	"Chances All"	Koda Kumi	Toby Gad, Tyrone Griffin, Glenda Proby	3:57
7.	"Aenaku Naru Kurai Nara" (会えなくなるくらいなら / If I Can't Meet You)	Koda Kumi	Yoko Kuzuya	4:15
8.	"Haircut"	Koda Kumi	Fredrik Thomander • Andreas Öberg • Johan Becker • Maria Marcus	2:45
9.	"Guess Who Is Back"	Koda Kumi • Back-On	Back-On	3:26
10.	"HOT HOT"	Koda Kumi • Frida Molander • Anna Alerstedt • Freja Jonsson Blomberg	Maria Marcus • Frida Molander • Anna Alerstedt • Freja Jonsson Blomberg	2:50
11.	"Kokoro Kara i love u" (心から / Sincerely)	Koda Kumi	Hi-Yunk	5:29
12.	"Work That"	Koda Kumi	Sidnie Tipton • James Newman • Stuart Crichton	2:56
13.	"Pin Drop"	Koda Kumi	Chris Wahle • Dele Ladimeji	3:30

DVD/Blu-Ray
No.	Title	Director(s)	Length
1.	"HUSH" (Music Video)	YKBX	3:51
2.	"Watch Out!! ~DNA~" (Music Video)	YKBX	3:12
3.	"Haircut" (Music Video)	Yuki Tsujimoto	3:47
4.	"Chances All" (Music Video)	Kento Takahashi

DVD2: Koda Kumi Fanclub Tour ~AND~ at DRUM LOGOS in Fukuoka
No.	Title	Length
1.	"Koda Kumi Fanclub Tour ~AND~ (DRUM LOGOS in Fukuoka 2018.04.29): 1. "It's My Life"; 2. "Pop Diva"; 3. "Sweetest Taboo"; 4. "Selfish"; 5. "WHO"; 6. "Brain"; 7. "Got Me Going'"; 8. "Sometimes Dreams Come True"; 9. "My Fun ~my son version~" 10. "All Right" <DANCER INTRODUCTION>; 11. "Freaky"; 12. "Hot Stuff feat. KM-MARKIT"; 13. "Megumi no Hito"; 14. "Party"; 15. "LIT"

DVD3: Behind-the-Scenes
No.	Title	Length
1.	"Koda Kumi Fanclub Tour ~AND~" (Making Film)
2.	"DNA" (Making Film)

== Personnel ==
Credits are adapted from album's liner notes

Musicians

- Koda Kumi – vocals
- JUN – background vocals (track 6)
- Koji Tetsui – bass (track 7)
- Tadashi Iwamaru – drums (track 7)
- Udai Shika – cello (track 7, 11)
- Shoko Oki – violin (track 7, 11)
- Masaki Iehara – arranger, guitar and programming (track 11)
- Yasuo Sano – drums (track 11)
- Hiroo Yamaguchi – bass guitar (track 11)
- BACK-ON – arranger, composer (track 9)
- Hi-yunk – arranger, composer (track 3, 4, 11)
- Bobby Conscious – arranger, composer (track 1)
- Louise Frick-Sveen – arranger, composer (track 2)
- Albin Nordqvist – arranger, composer (track 2)
- Daniel Kim – arranger (track 5)
- Mitsu.J – guitar (track 5)
- Shinjiroh Inoue – programming and guitar (track 7)
- Fredrik Thomander – composer (track 8)
- Andreas Öberg – composer (track 8)
- Johan Becker – composer (track 8)
- Maria Marcus – arranger (track 10), composer (track 8)
- Frida Molander – lyricist, music (track 10)
- Anna Alerstedt – lyricist, music (track 10)
- Freja Jonsson Blomberg – lyricist, music (track 10)
- Chris Wahle – composer (track 13)
- Dele Ladimeji – composer (track 13)
- Darby Ward – composer (track 13)
- Yoshiaki Onishi – mixer
- Makato Yamadoi – mixer and recorder

Production team

- MAX Matsuura – executive producer
- Katsumi Kuroiwa – executive producer
- Shinji Hayashi – general producer
- Shintaro Higuchi – executive supervisor
- Takeya Ino – executive supervisor
- Shingo Toguchi – advisory producer
- Hideki Endo – advisory producer
- Yugo Suzuki – advisory producer
- Kazutaka Yagi – artist management chief
- Mamiko Ohkami – artist management chief
- Misaki Tanaka – artist management
- Shinsuke Kubo – artist management supervisor
- Hitoshi Itagaki – general artist management
- Naoko Asai – artist management desk
- Yoichi Takeda – artist planner
- Masatoshi Uchida – A&R manager
- Yu Kikuchi – A&R
- Atsushi Sawamura – creative director
- Miho Shirai – assistant creative director
- Akihiko Oda – sales promotion manager
- Kenta Tamura – sales promotion
- Rie Kosuge – sales promotion
- Nobutoshi Ono – A&R general manager
- Yu Koiguchi – artist planner general manager
- Hiromi Amano – creative supervisor
- Mayumi Tokairin – A&R desk
- Rumi Kasai – A&R desk
- Akihito Yamanaka – tour management producer
- Shinya Kato – tour management assistant
- Ro Cholsik – tour management
- Mio Sakai – tour management
- Satoshi Arisaka – MD supervisor
- Naoki Mori – MD producer
- Asami Sugaya – fan club director
- Azusa Horiuchi – fan club director
- Taisuke Fujimoto – fan club director
- Kenta Sugawara – fan club producer

Package staff

- Taku Nakai – art direction & design
- TISCH – photographer
- Kazuhito Sugito – hair
- Yayoi Tanda – make-up
- Kazuyo Shinato – stylist
- Akiko Akui – nailist
- Yukiko Yamashita – creative coordination

== Oricon Sales Chart (Japan) ==
Release	Chart	Peak position	Debut sales	Sales total
August 22, 2018	Oricon Daily Charts	2	11,686	19,665
August 22, 2018	Weekly Chart	3	15,814	19,665
August 22, 2018	Monthly Chart	18	17,319	19,665
August 22, 2018	Yearly Chart	239	19,665	19,665
