= Live Tour 2017: W Face =

Live Tour 2017 ~W Face~

Video by Koda Kumi
- Released: December 6, 2017
- Recorded: 2017
- Genre: Pop, R&B, J-pop, dance-pop, rock, hip-hop
- Label: Rhythm Zone; 2DVD (RZBD-86423); 2DVD+2CD [Limited] (RZBD-86420); Blu-ray (RZXD-86425); Blu-ray+2CD [Limited] (RZXD-86422)
- Producer: Koda Kumi

Koda Kumi chronology
Live Tour 2016: Best Single Collection (2016)	Live Tour 2017; ~W Face~ (2017)	Live Tour 2018: DNA (2019)

Koda Kumi Live Tour 2017 ~W Face~ (stylized as KODA KUMI LIVE TOUR 2017 ~W FACE~) is a live concert DVD by Japanese singer-songwriter Koda Kumi, and coincides with her studio albums W Face ~Inside~ and W Face ~Outside~. The DVD was released a month before tour concluded on January 28, 2018. It peaked at No. 2 on the Oricon live charts and remained on the charts for twelve weeks.

It became her second consecutive tour to take place in 47 prefectures of Japan. The concert was released for purchase as 2DVD, Blu-ray, 2DVD+2CD and Blu-ray+2CD, the latter two of which were of limited edition.

== Information ==
Live Tour 2017 ~W Face~ is the seventeenth live DVD released by Japanese recording artist Koda Kumi. The tour coincided with her dual-release studio albums W Face ~Inside~ and W Face ~Outside~ and spanned for a year across 47 prefectures of Japan. The tour began on April 8, 2017, at Fukushima Prefectural Culture Center and ended with a transfer performance on January 28, 2018, at Okinawa City Hall. The DVD/Blu-ray debuted at No. 2 on the Oricon DVD & Blu-ray Charts, where it took No. 4 for the weekly ranking, remaining on the charts for twelve consecutive weeks.

The live was released as a 2DVD combo pack, a higher quality Blu-ray and limited 2DVD+2CD and Blu-ray+2CD combo packs. The limited editions featured two bonus CDs, which housed the full concert's audio.

The performance that was utilized on the DVDs and Blu-rays was performed at Tokyo International Forum in Hall A on August 6.

While most of the songs performed for the tour were from her W Face studio albums, others came from her first cover album Eternity ~Love & Songs~ (2010) and her studio albums Walk of My Life (2015), Dejavu (2011), Universe (2010), Trick (2009) and Kingdom (2008).

== Track listing ==
=== DVD1 ===
<Opening Movie>

1. "Ultraviolet"
2. "Pop Diva"
3. "Wicked Girls"
4. "Hurricane"
5. "Money in My Bag"
6. "Insane"
7. "Bassline"
8. "Damn real"
  <Interlude 1>
9. "Yorokobi no Kakera"
10. "Ai no Uta"
  <Band Introduction>
11. "Tattoo"
12. "Sweet Memories"
13. "Chiisa na koi no uta"
14. "Heartless"
15. "Sukideshite"
16. "Bridget Song"
17. "Stand by you"
  <Interlude 2>
18. "Hotel"
19. "Taboo"
20. "XXX"
  <MPC Playing>
  <Dancer Introduction>
21. "Be My Baby"
22. "Loaded" feat. Sean Paul
23. "Bring It On"
24. "What's Up"
  -Encore-
25. "Universe"
26. "Butterfly"
27. "Comes up"
28. "LIT"
29. "walk"

=== DVD2 ===
1. "Both Sides" (Documentary Film)

=== 2CD ===
CD1
No.	Title	Length
1.	"Ultraviolet"
2.	"Pop Diva"
3.	"Wicked Girls / Hurricane / Money in My Bag"
4.	"Insane"
5.	"Bassline"
6.	"Damn real"
7.	"Yorokobi no Kakera"
8.	"Ai no Uta"
9.	"Tattoo / Sweet Memories / Chiisa na koi no uta"
10.	"Heartless"
11.	"Sukideshite"
12.	"Bridget Song"
13.	"Stand by you"

CD2
No.	Title	Length
1.	"Hotel"
2.	"Taboo"
3.	"XXX"
4.	"Be My Baby"
5.	"Loaded feat. Sean Paul"
6.	"Bring It On"
7.	"What's Up"
8.	"Universe"
9.	"Butterfly"
10.	"Comes Up"
11.	"LIT"
12.	"walk"

== Chart ranking (Japan) ==
Oricon Sales Chart (Japan)

Release	Chart	Peak position	Chart run
December 6, 2017	Oricon Daily Charts	2	
December 6, 2017	Oricon Weekly Charts	4	12 weeks
