= Koda Kumi Driving Hit's 8 =

Remix album by Kumi Koda
- Released: March 28, 2018
- Recorded: 2003–2018 (vocals), 2018 (melodies)
- Genre: Drum and bass; dubstep; house
- Label: Rhythm Zone

Kumi Koda chronology
| AND (2018) | Koda Kumi Driving Hit's 8 (2018) | DNA (2018) |

Koda Kumi Driving Hit's 8 is the tenth remix album released by singer-songwriter Koda Kumi, and eighth in her Driving Hit's series – those outside of the series were Koda Kumi Remix Album (2006) and Beach Mix (2012). The album was released on March 28, 2018, one month after her studio album AND. It became her lowest-ranking remix album, debuting at No. 27 on the Oricon Albums Charts. It fell in ranking throughout the week, landing it at No. 40 for the weekly ranking.

Many of the songs for the album were from the album AND, with only five of the sixteen tracks being pulled from prior albums and/or singles. Those from earlier albums including "real Emotion" from Grow into One (2003), "Freaky" from Kingdom (2008), "Sometimes Dreams Come True" from Walk of My Life (2015), "You're So Beautiful" from Universe (2010) and "Selfish" from secret (2005). The album had two separate remixes of "All Right," which was track No. 7 from AND.

The album became her first in the Driving Hit's series to include a background outside of the standard blank canvas.

Twelve remix artists performed for the album, including TeddyLoid, who has worked with Kumi since Driving Hit's 4 (2012), KATFYR, Voia, and James Landino.

== Track listing ==
1. "Party" (KATFYR Remix)
2. "Sweetest Taboo" (MATZ Remix)
3. "Got Me Going'" (TeddyLoid Remix)
4. "Who" (KNOXX Remix)
5. "Outta My Head" (YUTO Remix)
6. "Never Enough" (YUTO Remix)
7. "All Right" (Voia Remix)
8. "LIT" (YUTO Remix)
9. "Brain" (James Landino Remix)
10. "It's My Life" (VXIA Remix)
11. "real Emotion" (TeddyLoid Remix)
12. "Freaky" (MATZ Remix)
13. "Sometimes Dreams Come True" (Kiyoshi Sugo Remix)
14. "You're So Beautiful" (D.O.C Remix)
15. "Selfish" (ALKA-LINE Remix)
16. "All Right" (qlius Remix)

== Charts (Japan) ==
Oricon Sales Chart (Japan)

| Release | Chart | Peak position |
|---|---|---|
| March 28, 2018 | Oricon Daily Charts | 27 |
| March 28, 2018 | Oricon Weekly Charts | 40 |
