= Kenji Suzuki (announcer) =

Japanese television announcer (1929–2024)

Kenji Suzuki (鈴木 健二, Suzuki Kenji; 23 January 1929 – 29 March 2024) was a Japanese freelancer moderator and former television announcer of NHK General TV. He is best known for as an executive announcer for NHK (with director status) from 1952 until his retirement 1988. He is also best known for hosting programs, such as History Invitation and Interesting Quiz Seminar, which he achieved high ratings, and also, he written many books, including The Recommendation of Consideration, which became a bestseller in Japan.

Recently, Suzuki became as a director of Kumamoto Prefectural Theater, where he worked on restoring traditional performing arts with among others. In 1998, Suzuki also became as a director of Aomori Prefectural Library and Aomori Prefecture Museum of Modern Literature.

He is the younger brother of Japanese film director Seijun Suzuki (1923–2017).

Suzuki died of natural causes at the hospital in Fukuoka on 29 March 2024, at the age of 95.

== Selected works ==
In a statistical overview derived from writings by and about Kenji Suzuki, OCLC/WorldCat encompasses roughly 100+ works in 100+ publications in 4 languages and 200+ library holdings.

- 敬語に強くなる本: 豊かな日本語への招待 (1978)
- 気くばりのすすめ (1982)
- 女らしさ物語 (1982)
- ビッグマン愚行錄 (1982)
- 続気くばりのすすめ (1983)
- 役に立つ日本史物語 (1988)
- 夫婦が読む本 (1991)

== Public director's career ==
Suzuki has experience as announcer, and following as directors public facilities.

- Kumamoto Prefectural Theater (1998-1998)
- Aomori Prefectural Library (1998-2004)
