= Unicorn (Koda Kumi album) =

Studio album by Koda Kumi
- Released: April 17, 2024
- Recorded: 2023–2024
- Genre: J-pop
- Length: 42:06
- Label: Rhythm Zone
- Producer: Koda Kumi

Koda Kumi chronology
Heart (2022)	Unicorn (2024)

Singles from Unicorn
- 1. "Trust・Last" Released: March 8, 2023; 2. "Let's Fight for Love!" Released: August 21, 2023; 3. "Tōi Machi no Doko ka de..." Released: December 6, 2023; 4. "Vroom" Released: December 20, 2023; 5. "Silence" Released: February 14, 2024

Unicorn (stylized as UNICORN) is the eighteenth studio album by the Japanese singer Koda Kumi, released on April 17, 2024, over two years after her previous studio album, Heart (2022).

It was released in five editions: CD+DVD, CD+Blu-ray, CD+DVD Box Set, CD+Blu-ray Box Set and a limited CD edition. Unicorn has eleven musical tracks on the CD and three music videos on the DVD/Blu-ray. The Box sets included the making of the album. Prior to the album's release, Kumi released four digital songs to help promote the album: "Let's Fight for Love!", "Toi Machi no Doko ka de...", "Vroom" and "Silence." The only physical single was "Trust・Last", which she performed with Shōnan no Kaze. Koda Kumi released a solo version on the album.

== Background and release ==
Unicorn is the eighteenth studio album by Koda Kumi, and was released on April 17, 2024. It debuted at No. 9 on the Oricon Albums Charts.

The album was released in five editions: a limited edition CD+Live Venue, which was only available to her fan club Koda Gumi, CD+DVD, CD+Blu-ray, and box sets of both the CD+DVD and CD+Blu-ray editions, each which contained a photo book and a making video of the album.

The album was preceded by five singles: "Trust・Last", "Let's Fight for Love!", "Toi Machi no Doko ka de..." (遠い街のどこかで... / Somewhere in a Distant City), "Vroom" and "Silence.".

The CD contained six new tracks, along with the previously released digital singles and a solo version of "Trust・Last", originally performed with Shōnan no Kaze for the Japanese drama series Kamen Rider Geats. The DVD and Blu-ray contained the corresponding music videos for "Silence", "Vroom" and "Toi Machi no Doko ka de...". The box sets contained behind-the-scenes footage.

== Promotional activities ==
On March 8, 2023, Koda Kumi teamed up with Japanese reggae group Shonan no Kaze for the song "Trust・Last." The song was utilized as the theme song for the Japanese drama series Kamen Rider Geats. A short version of the music video was uploaded on Avex's official YouTube on March 12, 2023, to aid in promotions.

== Track listing ==
CD
No.	Title	Lyrics	Music	Arranger(s)	Length
1.	"Unicorn" (Introduction)	Koda Kumi	Hi-yunk	Hi-yunk	0:57
2.	"Heaven's Kitchen"	Bonnie Pink	Hi-yunk	Bonnie Pink • Hi-yunk	3:27
3.	"Vroom"	Koda Kumi	Hi-yunk	Hi-yunk	3:12
4.	"Tokio"	Shigesato Itoi	Kunihiko Kase	Hi-yunk	3:51
5.	"Silence"	Koda Kumi • Shinjiroh Inoue	Shinjiroh Inoue • Udai Shika	Shinjiroh Inoue	4:48
6.	"UFO"	Yuu Aku	Shunichi Tokura • YUTA	CHIVA • Kazz Noguchi	4:08
7.	"We are Fighters"	Koda Kumi	T-SK • Emi Tawata • Sam Vending • Haleigh Bowers	HiDE Kawada • T-SK	4:02
8.	"Trust・Last" (TYPE K)	Shōnan no Kaze	Hi-yunk	Hi-yunk	3:50
9.	"Piece of My Wish"	Yuho Iwasato	Tomoka Ueda	Gakushi	4:58
10.	"Toi Machi no Doko ka de..." (遠い街のどこかで... / Somewhere in a Distant City)	Mika Watanabe	Satoshi Takebe • Tetsuro Toyama • Hitoshi Konno	Hideya Nakazaki	5:32
11.	"Let's Fight for Love!"	Koda Kumi	Hi-yunk	Hi-yunk	3:21
Total length:					42:06

DVD/Blu-ray
No.	Title	Director(s)	Length
1.	"Silence" (Music Video)	Ryuji Seki	4:51
2.	"Vroom" (Music Video)	Ryuji Seki	3:12
3.	"Toi Machi no Doko ka de..." (Music Video)	Ryuji Seki	5:42
4.	"Unicorn" (Behind the Scenes)

== Charts ==
Chart performance for Unicorn
Chart (2024)	Peak position
Japanese Albums (Oricon)	14
