= Emelie Sederholm =

Finnish singer-songwriter

Venior
- Born: Emelie Sederholm; January 30, 1994 (age 32); Kauniainen, Finland
- Occupation: Singer
- Years active: 2012–present

Emelie Sederholm (born 1994), also known by her stage name Venior, is a Finnish singer-songwriter from Kauniainen, Finland. She is based in Stockholm, Sweden. She is currently working on her debut album while also writing for other artists.

She released her first single "Breathe Deep, Fall Slowly" in January 2012 at the age of 17.

Sederholm has lived in Stockholm, London, and Berlin.

== Discography ==
=== Singles ===
- Breathe Deep, Fall Slowly (2012)
