= Mike Tyler =

American poet

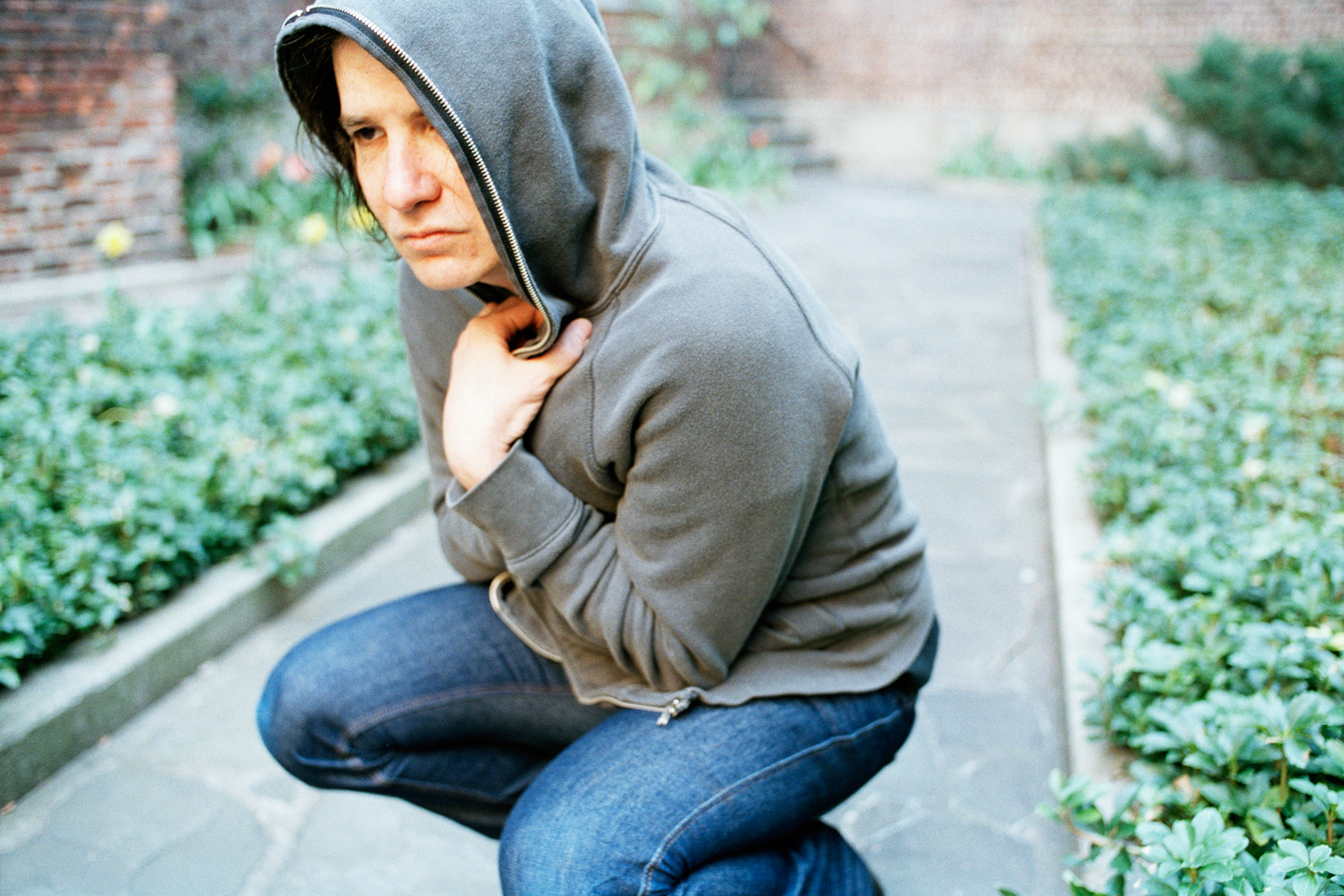
Tyler in Manhattan, Spring 2009. by Shiori Kawasaki

Mike Tyler is a non-academic, post-beat American poet.

He first became known during the 1990s poetry revival centered on the Nuyorican Poets Café in New York City. He has been dubbed the “most dangerous poet in America” because he once broke an arm while doing a reading.

Tyler was born in Greenwich Village. His paternal grandfather is the educator Ralph W. Tyler, Sr. He attended Stuyvesant High School and was a student of the writer Frank McCourt. He dropped out.

From 1994 to 2002 he was the poet-in-residence at the artist decorated Carlton Arms Hotel in New York City living in a room with a felt rhino. A plaque (cardboard) celebrating his stay currently hangs on the door of the room. His book, “From Colorado to Georgia” is available in the rooms of the hotel.

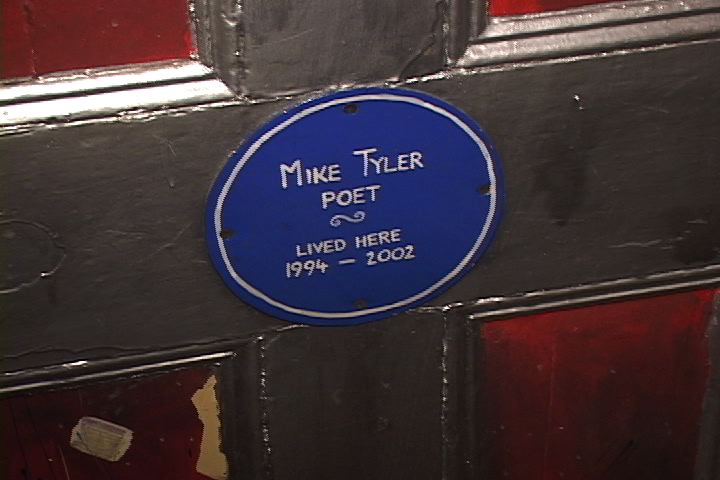
Tyler's door plaque at The Carlton Arms Hotel, Manhattan

He has been cited as an influence on the musician Beck. The artist Banksy has stenciled Tyler's line “only the ridiculous survive” outside of London's Paddington Station. The line comes from Tyler's series of six poems with the same name, “The Complete Breakdown of Everything.”

Tyler's writing style has been described as terse, epigrammatic epiphanies. He is concerned with language, both beautiful and otherwise, as a political activity, and the “muddle-class” as a group robbed of language, and so robbed of a voice. He is known for his poem “The Most Beautiful Word in the American Language” (Resist).

“The Iggy Pop of Poetry”, his high-octane physical reading style has been controversial, leading to him once receiving a zero at a poetry slam. The judge said he could not hear the poetry through his antics. Tyler responded in his poem “Suggestion Box.” If you didn’t move around so much/I could listen to your poetry/If I didn’t move around so much/you wouldn’t even bother with/you couldn’t listen to my poetry/you just wouldn’t listen/to my poetry.

He performed his one word poem “Nixon Is Dead” (Good) on BBC radio, entering to introductory music (“He’s My Thing” by Babes in Toyland) longer than the poem itself. He appeared full-frontally nude performing his poem Trial By Ice for the PBS Series, The United States of Poetry (is it o.k. to yell fire/at a fire). The performance was cut from the show, but Tyler did appear completely naked in stills from the program in the coffee table book of the same name.

He recreated the James Brown Hardest Working Man in Show Business Routine while doing a poetry reading.

Noted UK Journalist AA Gill in the London Sunday Times was bemused by a Mike Tyler performance at London's Institute of Contemporary Arts (ICA): “He had not endeared himself to us. I mean this is the ICA, it’s London, this audience is so cool the bar doesn’t even bother stocking ice. And there’s this geezer claiming to be a poet, I mean he hasn’t even got sunglasses on. Anyway he starts whining his poem, which is sort of Ezra Pound out of Beavis and Butt-Head ...” Gill went on to quote a short Mike Tyler poem in full. Just before/the end of the world/somebody said/to somebody else/” Hey, look, it’s not like it’s the end of the world”.

The most infamous act of Tyler's career occurred on Friday November 30, 1992. Dying to read a poem at the Nuyorican Poets Café but with a long line ahead of him, Tyler took his poem outside to 3rd Street. He used the flatbed of a truck for a stage and paced and prowled. He didn't recite the poem, he exorcised it. He sprung to the top of a wire fence, then dived to the sidewalk landing on his left arm. Which broke at the elbow.
