= Heart (Koda Kumi album) =

Studio album by Koda Kumi
- Released: March 2, 2022
- Recorded: 2021–2022
- Genre: J-pop
- Label: Rhythm Zone
- Producer: Koda Kumi

Koda Kumi chronology
| Best: 2000–2020 (2021) | Heart (2022) | Unicorn (2024) |

Singles from Heart
- 1. "We'll Be OK" Released: July 28, 2021; 2. "Doo-Bee-Doo-Bop" Released: August 18, 2021; 3. "To Be Free" Released: September 8, 2021; 4. "4 More" Released: November 15, 2021; 5. "100 no Kodokutachi e" Released: December 6, 2021

Heart is the seventeenth studio album by the Japanese singer Koda Kumi, released on March 2, 2022, over two years after her previous studio album Re(cord) (2019). The album was released on streaming platforms a month prior to the physical release on February 2.

It was released in four editions: CD only, CD+DVD, CD+Blu-ray and CD+3DVD. Heart has twelve musical tracks on the CD and seven music videos on the DVD/Blu-ray with a making video of "Sure Shot." Prior to the album's release, Kumi released five digital songs to help promote the album: "We'll Be OK", "Doo-Bee-Doo-Bop", "To Be Free", "4 More", and "100 no Kodokutachi e".

== Background and release ==
Heart was originally released on streaming platforms on February 2, a month prior to its physical release. The album was released in four editions: CD only, CD+DVD, CD+Blu-ray and a limited edition CD+3DVD, which was only available to her fan club, Koda Gumi.

The album was preceded by five digital singles: "We'll Be OK", "Doo-Bee-Doo-Bop", "To Be Free", "4 More" and "100 no Kodokutachi e" (100のコドク達へ / To 100 Lonely Souls).

The CD contained seven new tracks, along with the previously released digital singles. The DVD and Blu-ray contained the corresponding music videos for the singles, along with the new video for "Sure Shot" and a dance version of "4 More". The second and third DVD were only released on the CD+3DVD and CD+2Blu-ray fan club editions. The second DVD housed her "20th→21st Anniversary Event" that was performed on December 6, 2021, at Toyosu PIT in Kōtō, Tokyo, along with a behind-the-scenes featurette. The second DVD housed the events she performed at Zepp Tokyo on December 3 and 4.

== Promotional activities ==
To help promote the album, Koda Kumi performed at several live venues. She performed "100 no Kodokutachi e" at Music Fair on December 4, 2021, and Live Empower Children 2022 on February 15, 2022. All of the digital singles were aired on the radio station J-Wave's program "Groove Line" after the music ban was lifted.

"100 no Kodokutachi e" was advertised as the "saddest ballad" Kumi had released throughout her career.

Kumi collaborated with Taiwanese-American artist ØZI for "Outta My Control." For the song "Good Time", she collaborated with Japanese-American artist Ai.

== Commercial performance ==
Heart debuted and peaked at number 4 on Oricon Daily Albums chart for February 1, 2022.

== Track listing ==
CD
| No. | Title | Lyrics | Music | Length |
|---|---|---|---|---|
| 1. | "Bow Wow" | Koda Kumi | Hi-yunk |
| 2. | "Sure Shot" | Hi-yunk | Hi-yunk • RUSH EYE |
| 3. | "Atlas" | Koda Kumi | Will Simms • Ronny Svendsen • Nermin Harambasic • Anne Judith |
| 4. | "Good Time" (featuring Ai) | Koda Kumi • Ai Uemura | Theron Thomas • Sam Sumser • Sean Small |
| 5. | "Outta My Control" (featuring ØZI) | Koda Kumi • ØZI | Bhavik Pattani • Charlie Storwick |
| 6. | "Anemone" (アネモネ) | Koda Kumi | Hi-yunk |
| 7. | "100 no Kodokutachi e" (100のコドク達へ / To 100 Lonely Souls) | jam | Katsuhiko Yamamoto |
| 8. | "To Be Free" | Koda Kumi | T-SK • Adam Yaron • Imad Eljattari • Luigi Nabuurs • Pascal Oorts |
| 9. | "Red" | Koda Kumi | C-Young • Jessica Eunjoo (Decade+) • BEI(Decade+) • K.O(Decade+) |
| 10. | "4 More" | Koda Kumi | Tiaan Cristie Williams • Olympia Henshaw • Hailey Leane Collier • Will Simms • Lagazio Sebastian Morales |
| 11. | "Doo-Bee-Doo-Bop" | Koda Kumi | UTA • Hi-yunk |
| 12. | "We'll Be OK" | Koda Kumi | Atsushi Shimada • Albin Nordqvist • Louise Frick Sveen wiki |

DVD1
| No. | Title | Length |
|---|---|---|
| 1. | "Sure Shot" (Music Video) | 4:40 |
| 2. | "100 no Kodokutachi e" (Music Video) | 5:55 |
| 3. | "To Be Free" (Music Video) | 3:50 |
| 4. | "4 More" (Music Video) | 3:12 |
| 5. | "Doo-Bee-Doo-Bop" (Music Video) | 3:11 |
| 6. | "We'll Be OK" (Music Video) | 3:51 |
| 7. | "4 More" (Dance Version) (Music Video) | 3:07 |
| 8. | "Heart" (Behind-the-Scenes) | 49:15 |

DVD2
| No. | Title | Length |
|---|---|---|
| 1. | "Koda Kumi 20th→21st Anniversary Event" (2021.12.6 ＠Toyosu PIT) | 1:50:08 |
| 2. | "Koda Kumi 20th→21st Anniversary Event" (Behind-the-Scenes) | 6:30 |

DVD3
| No. | Title | Length |
|---|---|---|
| 1. | "Koda Kumi 20th→21st Anniversary Event" (2021.12.3 ＠Zepp Tokyo) | 1:36:24 |
| 2. | "Koda Kumi 20th→21st Anniversary Event-" (2021.12.4 ＠Zepp Tokyo) | 1:30:00 |
| 3. | "Nissin RAOH Presents Koda Kumi Special Online Live 2021" | 45:38 |

== Charts ==
Chart performance for Heart
| Chart (2022) | Peak position |
|---|---|
| Japanese Albums (Oricon) | 9 |
| Japanese Hot Albums (Billboard Japan) | 11 |
