= Kumamoto Prefectural Theater =

Centre for the performing arts in Kumamoto, Kumamoto Prefecture, Japan

Kumamoto Prefectural Theater 熊本県立劇場
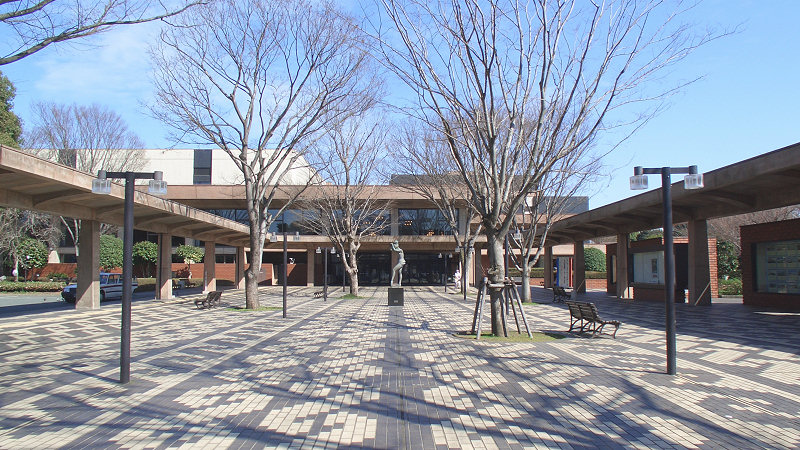
- Interactive map of the Kumamoto Prefectural Theater 熊本県立劇場 area

General information
- Location: 2-7-1 Ōe, Chūō-ku, Kumamoto, Kumamoto, Japan
- Coordinates: 32°48′9″N 130°43′42″E
- Completed: 1982
- Opening: Dec
- Cost: ¥ 7, 273 million

Technical details
- Floor area: 23,658 m^{2}

Design and construction
- Architect: Kunio Maekawa
- Structural engineer: Kunio Maekawa
- Other designers: Nagata Acoustics

Website
- Hompepage (Jp)

References
- Factsheet

Kumamoto Prefectural Theater (熊本県立劇場, Kumamoto kenritsu gekijō) is a centre for the performing arts in Kumamoto, Kumamoto Prefecture, Japan.

== History ==
It opened in 1982 and has two main spaces: a concert hall that seats 1,813 and a theatre that seats 1,183. Maekawa Kunio was the architect, with acoustical design by Nagata Acoustics.
