= Fukushima Prefectural Culture Center =

Building in Fukushima Prefecture, Japan

Coordinates: 37°46′5.1″N 140°28′22.9″E

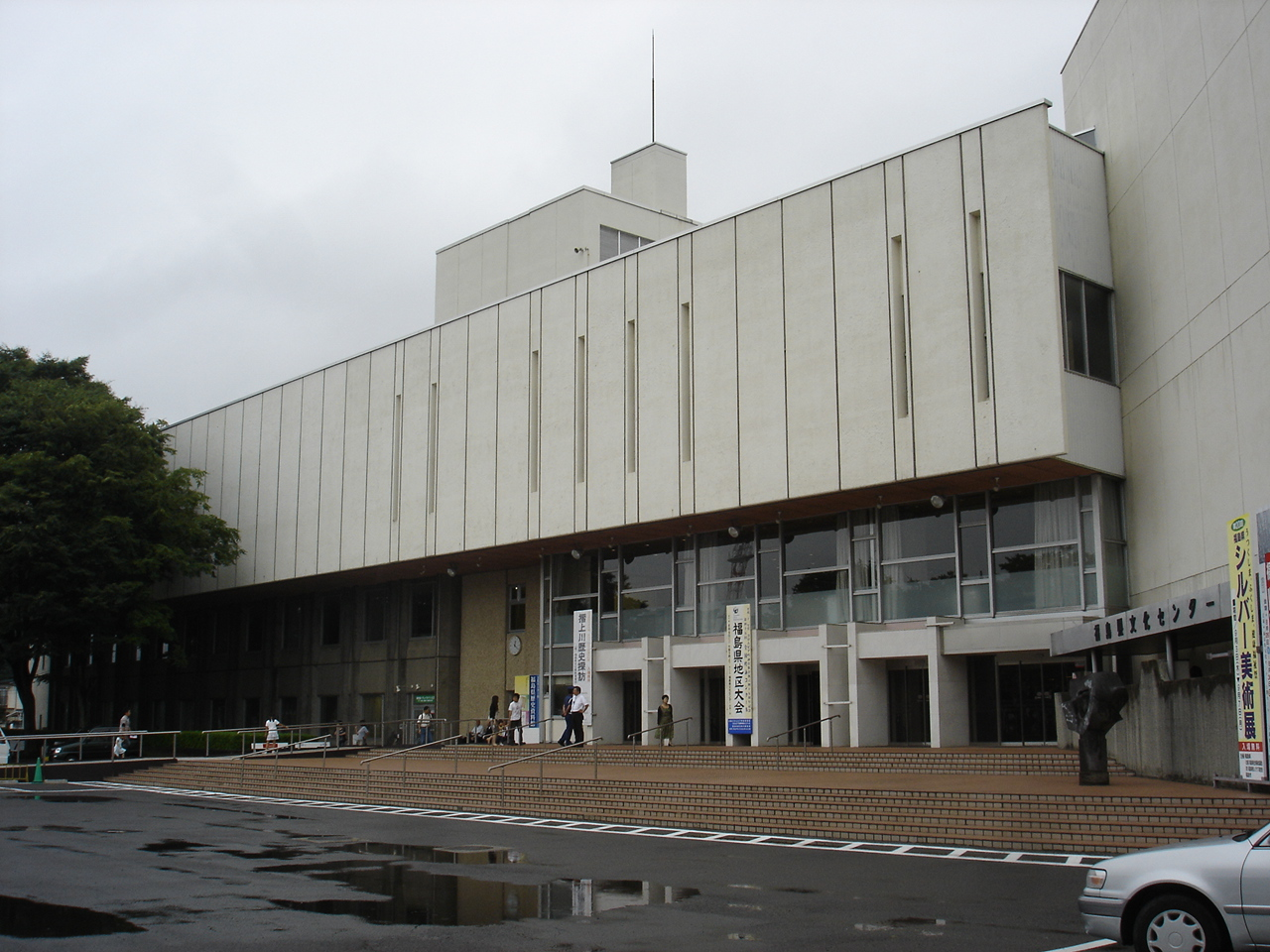
- Fukushima Prefectural Culture Center, August 2009
- Interactive map of Fukushima Prefectural Culture Center
- Address: 5-54 Kasuga-cho, Fukushima-shi 960-8116
- Location: Japan
- Owner: Fukushima Prefectural Culture Foundation
- Capacity: 1,752 + 379

Construction
- Opened: September 1970
- Renovated: 29 September 2012

Website
- www.culture-center.fks.ed.jp

The Fukushima Prefectural Culture Center (福島県文化センター, Fukushima-ken Bunka Sentā) is a large multi-purpose public cultural facility in the city of Fukushima, Japan, which opened in September 1970.

== Facilities ==
The building includes a main concert hall, which seats 1,752, and a smaller hall, which seats 379.

== History ==
The Fukushima Prefectural Culture Center opened in September 1970.

The building sustained extensive damage in the Great East Japan earthquake on 11 March 2011, and was closed to the public until some parts were able to be reopened for use from 13 August 2011. From 28 December 2011, the entire facility was closed again temporarily for work to repair earthquake damage and reinforce the building. It reopened from 29 September 2012.

== Performances ==
Musical artists and groups that have appeared on stage at the Fukushima Prefectural Culture Center include the following.

- The Alfee, Flying Away Spring, 21 June 1984
- Fuzjko Hemming, Fuzjko Hemming and The Moscow Philharmonic Orchestra, 21 November 2008
- B'z, Live-Gym 2010 "Ain't No Magic", 19 January 2010

== Art exhibitions ==
The Contemporary Art Biennale of Fukushima exhibition was held at the Fukushima Prefectural Culture Center every two years since 2004, but had to be relocated to Fukushima Airport in 2012 because the facility was rendered unusable by the March 2011 earthquake damage.

== Access ==
The Fukushima Prefectural Culture Center is located approximately 10 minutes by car from the main Fukushima Station.
