= Koda Kumi =

Japanese singer (born 1982)

- 倖田 來未
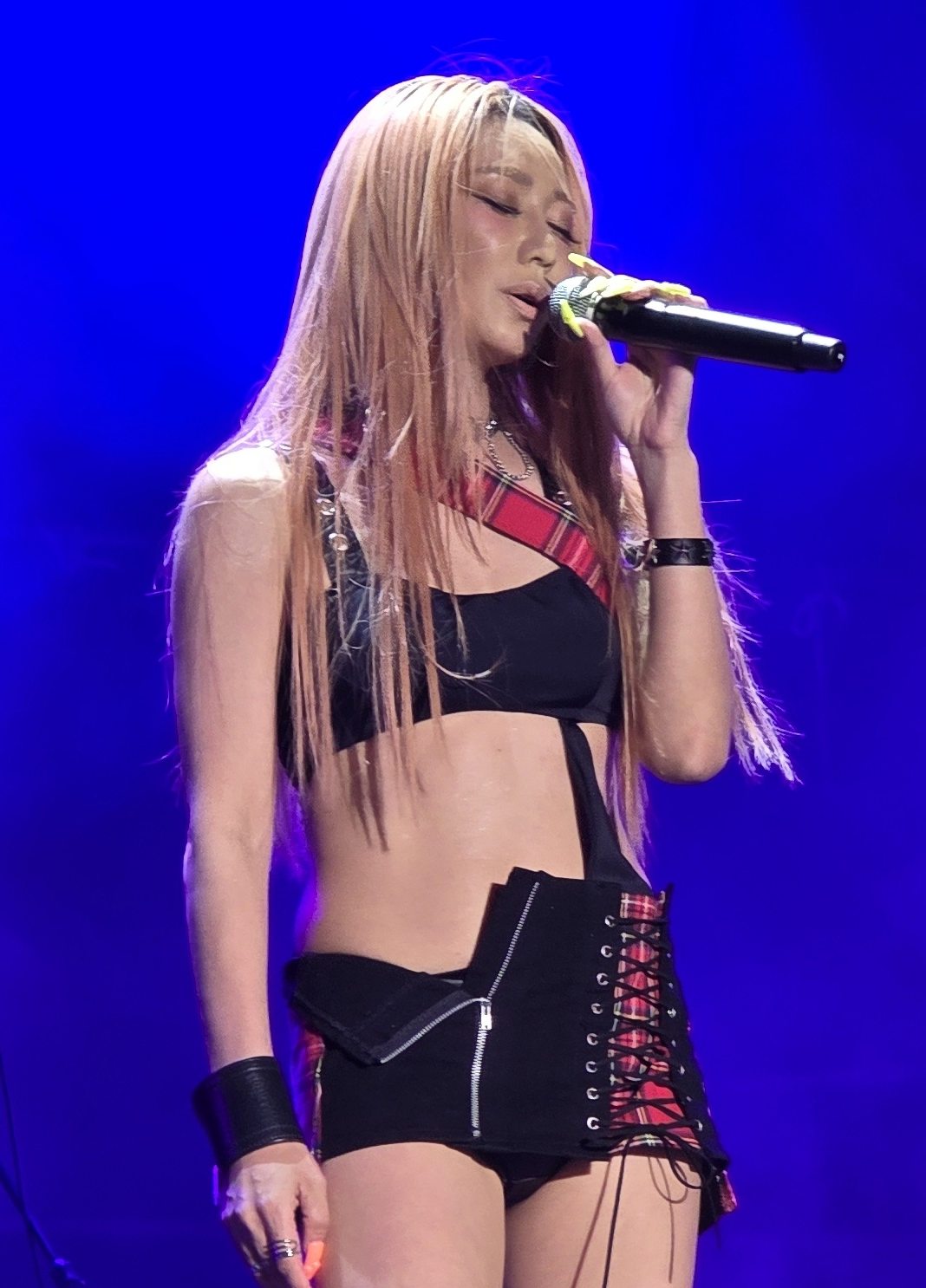
- Koda Kumi in 2025
- Born: Kumiko Kōda (神田 來未子); November 13, 1982 (age 44); Kyoto, Japan
- Occupations: Singer; actress; entrepreneur; songwriter; voice actress; dancer
- Years active: 2000–present
- Works: Discography
- Spouse: Kenji Kuriyama (m. 2011)
- Children: 2
- Musical career
- Genres: J-pop; pop; R&B
- Instrument: Vocals
- Labels: Rhythm Zone; Orpheus (United States)
- Website: rhythmzone.net/koda

Kumiko Kōda (神田 來未子, Kōda Kumiko; born November 13, 1982), known professionally as Koda Kumi (倖田 來未, Kōda Kumi), is a Japanese singer from Kyoto, known for her urban and R&B songs.

After debuting with the single "Take Back" in December 2000, Koda gained fame in March 2003 when the songs from her seventh single, "Real Emotion/1000 no Kotoba", were used as themes for the video game Final Fantasy X-2. Her popularity grew with the release of her fourth studio album Secret (2005), her sixteenth single "Butterfly" (2005), and her first greatest hits album Best: First Things (2005), reaching the number-three, number-two, and number-one spots respectively.

Though her early releases presented a conservative, quiet image, she has become a fashion leader among young women, setting trends such as the ero-kakkoii style. In 2006 and 2007, Oricon named Koda as the top selling artist of the year. (Note: She made ¥12,702,200,000 in profits, in 2006 approximately $ 136,465,304 and ¥7.3 Billion in 2007)

== Life and career ==
=== Early life ===
Koda was born into a family of musicians. Her grandfather was a Shakuhachi master and her mother was a Koto teacher; she is the older sister of Misono, current solo artist and former lead singer of Day After Tomorrow. Inspired by her mother, who performed in karaoke bars, Koda, from a young age, had aspirations of becoming a singer. Her school years were unhappy; she described her junior and high school years as "obscure times", as she was ridiculed due to her "fatness", "shortness", "ugliness", and other factors related to her appearance. During her second year of high school Koda auditioned in Avex's "Dream Audition", where she came in second out of 120,000 participants. She was then signed onto the Avex sub-label Rhythm Zone. Koda's first semi-biographical book, Koda-shiki ("Koda-style") was officially described as "a story about a girl who was filled with inferiority complex pursuing her way".

=== 2000–2004: Early career and image change ===
Koda debuted on December 6, 2000, with the single "Take Back"; it was followed by "Trust Your Love", "Color of Soul" (both 2001), and "So into You" (2002). "Trust Your Love" and "Color of Soul" were both Top 30 singles; the former reached number 18 on the chart and became Koda's first Top Twenty single. Using the stage name Koda, Koda recorded "Take Back" and "Trust Your Love" in English and released the singles in the United States under Orpheus Records. "Take Back" peaked at number 18 on the Hot Dance Music/Maxi-Singles Sales chart; "Trust Your Love" had more success, reaching the top spot on the Hot Dance Music/Maxi-Singles Sales chart. The single also charted on the Hot Singles Sales chart and Hot Dance Club Play chart, at No. 19 and No. 35, respectively. After the September 11, 2001 attacks, Koda recorded the charity single "The Meaning of Peace" with Korean singer BoA as part of Avex's Song+Nation project to raise funds for charity. In March 2002, Koda released her debut album Affection under Rhythm Zone; it peaked at number 12 on the Oricon album chart.

After the release of Affection, Koda released three singles. "Love Across the Ocean", "Maze" (both 2002), and "real Emotion/1000 no Kotoba" (2003). "Love Across the Ocean" and "Maze" peaked at the number 19 and 25 positions. Koda achieved minor success with "real Emotion/1000 no Kotoba", which peaked at number 3 after three weeks on the charts. The songs were used as the opening and ending themes, respectively, of the video game Final Fantasy X-2; in addition, Koda motion-acted the dance moves of one of the characters and voiced the character Lenne in the Japanese version of the game. She released her second album, Grow into One in March 2003. It debuted at number 11 on the charts, and peaked at number 8 in the fourth week of its run.

From then on, Koda continued a string of Top Twenty singles with "Come with Me", "Gentle Words" (both 2003), and "Crazy 4 U" (2004). She then released her third album Feel My Mind (February 2004), which debuted at number 7. Koda also covered the theme song of the anime series Cutie Honey originally by Yoko Maekawa for the 2004 live-action film and Re: Cutie Honey. The song, which shared the same name as the show, was included as a bonus track on the album and became the title track of her eleventh single, "Love & Honey" (2004), after the album's release. At the end of the year, Koda released two more singles, "Chase" and "Kiseki".

During her image change, Koda stated her concern about what her parents would think. When they approved and supported her, she chose to keep the style that would become infamous with her name: "erokakkoii (エロカッコイイ; lit. 'erotic cool')".

=== 2005–2006: Growing popularity ===
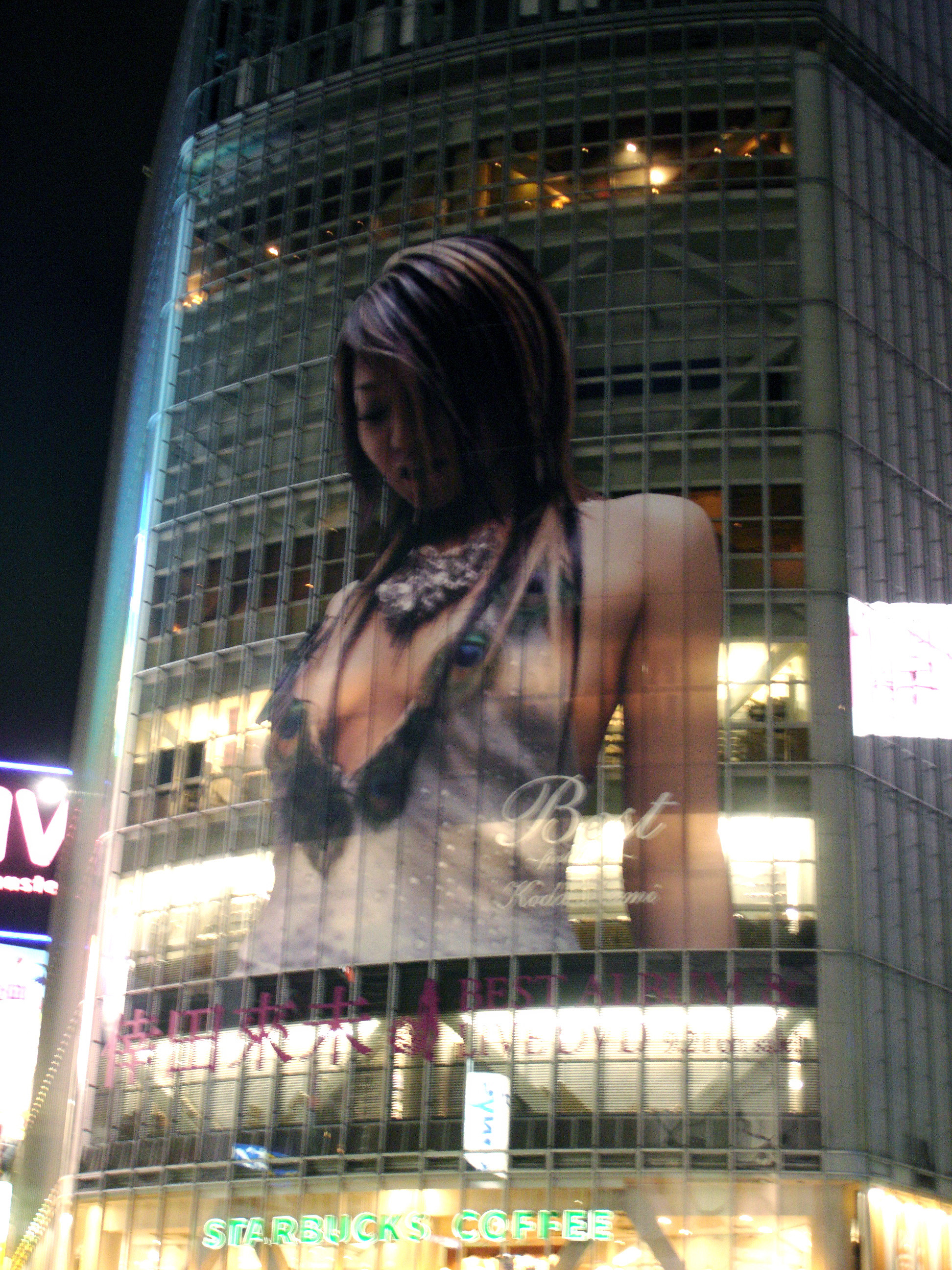
An advertisement for Best: First Things in Shibuya (2005)

Koda's first release of 2005 was her fourteenth single, "Hands" (January 19). Less than a month later, she released her fourth album, Secret. Secret debuted at number 3 and became her first album to debut in the Top Five. The album was certified double platinum by the RIAJ for selling 521,000 copies total. Koda then released her fifteenth single, "Hot Stuff", from the album. Shortly afterwards, Koda released her first live DVD, Secret: First Class Limited Live. In 2006, Oricon reported that Secret: First Class Limited Live had set a new record on the music DVD charts by remaining at the top of the Oricon DVD charts for seven weeks in total. Koda released her sixteenth single, "Butterfly", which debuted at number 2 on the Oricon chart. "Butterfly" was followed by "Flower" and "Promise/Star"; both peaked at number 4 in the weekly chart.

In September, Koda released her first greatest hits album, Best: First Things. The album debuted at number 2 on the chart in its first week but rose to the top the following week, giving Koda her first number-one album. Best: First Things sold over a million copies and was certified million by the Recording Industry Association of Japan. In December, Koda began the "12 Singles Project" in which for twelve consecutive weeks, she released one single per week (nine of which were labeled as limited editions). The first single of the 12 Singles Project, "You", debuted at the top of the chart, giving Koda her first number-one single. Koda then released "Birthday Eve", "D.D.D.", and "Shake It Up" before the end of the year. Koda released the remaining eight singles in the beginning of the new year. The first single was "Lies", followed by "Feel", "Candy", "No Regret", "Ima Sugu Hoshii", "Kamen", "Wind" and "Someday/Boys & Girls".

On the same day as she released the last single from the project, she released digitally Koda Kumi Remix Album, which includes remixes of songs from project. "Feel", the fifth single from the project, debuted atop the charts. "You" remained in the Oricon Top Ten during the release of "Shake It Up" and "Lies", making Koda the first female artist to have three singles in the Top Ten of the Oricon Weekly Singles chart. Koda's fashion in this period, in which she wore skin-baring clothes, started the ero-kakkoii trend in Japan. "Get It On", the thirteenth and last single of the "12 Singles Project", (Note: Although "Get It On" is the thirteenth single from the project, the cover art is marked with 00.) was Koda's first digital single; it was followed by her second greatest hits album, Best: Second Session. The album featured all twelve singles along with two new tracks and was released in three different formats: CD-only, CD+DVD, and CD+2DVD. Best: Second Session debuted at the top of the chart with 983,000 copies sold in its first week, making Koda the first female artist with the highest greatest hits album debut sales since Hikaru Utada's Utada Hikaru Single Collection Vol. 1. Like Best: First Things, Best: Second Session was certified million by the RIAJ.

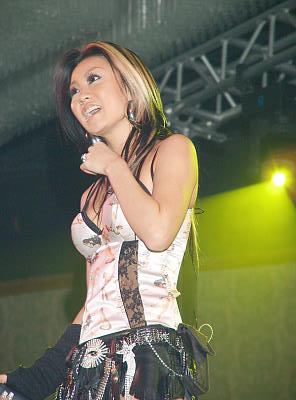
Koda Kumi on-stage (2005)

After Best: Second Session, Koda released "Koi no Tsubomi" which reached number 2 in its debut week with 140,000 copies sold, and eventually topped 1 million downloads. This was the highest debut week sales for a female artist in 2006, until Ayumi Hamasaki surpassed it with her single "Blue Bird". On July 26, 2006, Koda released her first photobook, Maroc; the book, photographed by Leslie Kee, was tied with her thirty-second single "4 Hot Wave", which was released on the same day. Koda reclaimed the title of highest debut week sales for a female artist in 2006 with "4 Hot Wave"; which also ranked second behind the KinKi Kids. "4 Hot Wave" is Koda's nineteenth consecutive single to debut in the Top Ten since "Kiseki". Koda's next single, "Yume no Uta / Futari de..." (2006), was a musical first for Koda, as she took full creative control over the production of the single and music video; she wrote the lyrics, chose the outfits, and produced the concepts for the videos of both songs. Koda then recorded a cover of the Bubblegum Brothers' "Won't Be Long" with label-mates Exile. "Cherry Girl/Unmei" was the last single Koda released before releasing her fifth album Black Cherry in December. Black Cherry became the first female studio album to stay atop the charts for four weeks since Ayumi Hamasaki's album Duty. At the end of 2006, Oricon named her the best-selling artist of 2006 with ¥12,702,200,000 profit (approximately $136,465,304), and Yahoo! Japan declared her to be the most-searched female artist and tenth most searched term overall in 2006.

=== 2007–2010: Commercial peak and controversy ===
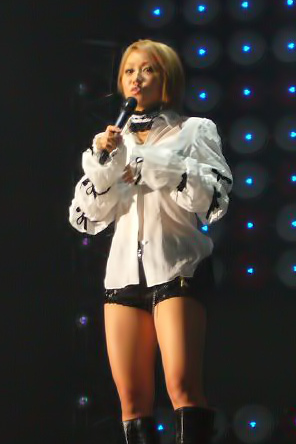
Koda in 2007

On March 14, 2007, Koda released her thirty-fifth single ("But/Aishō"), another greatest hits album (Best: Bounce & Lovers), and a DVD of her second tour Live Tour 2006–2007: Second Session. Her second single of 2007, "Freaky", reached the top spot on the Oricon, giving Koda her fourth number-one single. Koda performed at the Japanese leg of Live Earth in Tokyo on July 7, 2007, and attended AP Bank Fes '07, a conservationist-themed concert, hosted by Kazutoshi Sakurai of Mr. Children on July 15, 2007. At the end of 2007, Koda released two singles, "Ai no Uta" and "Last Angel", a collaboration with Korean boy band TVXQ better known as Tohoshinki in Japan. "Last Angel" was used as the theme song for the Japanese release for Resident Evil: Extinction. On December 1, she held her first performance at Tokyo Dome for her third nationwide and first arena tour. Koda became the seventh solo female singer to perform at Tokyo Dome with an estimated audience of 45,000 people. Having sold more than 7.3 billion yen worth of CDs and DVDs, Koda was again the best-selling artist of the year in Oricon's 2007 year-end rankings.

Koda released her thirty-ninth single "Anytime" on January 23, 2008; it was followed by her sixth studio album Kingdom, which was released in the same format as her previous album. With a little over 420,000 copies sold in its first week, Kingdom debuted atop the Oricon. On January 31, Koda hosted the radio show All Night Nippon. Discussing her manager's recent marriage and plans on having children, Koda claimed that women's amniotic fluid rots at the age of 35, and that women ought to have children before this happens. The comment drew controversy. Avex released an apology stating that as a consolation, all promotion of Kingdom would cease. Additionally, several of Koda's commercial endorsements were placed on hiatus. Koda herself made a public apology on Fuji TV. Despite the controversy, Kingdom remained on top for a second consecutive week. Two months after her controversial statement, Koda released Live Tour 2007: Black Cherry Tour Special Final in Tokyo Dome, her fourth live DVD. Her fourth nationwide tour Kumi Koda Live Tour 2008: Kingdom commenced on April 12, 2008. For the Japanese dub of Cirque du Freak: The Vampire's Assistant, the film got its own theme song, "Can We Go Back", sung by her. Koda's fortieth single "Moon" was released on June 11, 2008. Like "Freaky", "Moon" contained four tracks. The single contained "Moon Crying", used as the theme for Asahi Television drama Puzzle, and a collaboration track with The Black Eyed Peas' Fergie

Koda again attended Avex's annual summer concert A-Nation '08. She appeared at all eight shows in Japan and performed with other Avex artists such as Every Little Thing, Ai Otsuka, Namie Amuro, Ayumi Hamasaki, TVXQ, and Maki Goto. In October 2008, Koda released her forty-first single, "Taboo". With around 66,000 copies sold in its first week, "Taboo" debuted at the number-one position and became Koda's fifth single to reach the top. Koda released her forty-second single "Stay with Me" on Christmas Eve, which debuted atop of the chart selling 58,000 copies. Koda's seventh studio album, Trick, was another number-one album for the singer, selling 253,000 in its first week. The album stayed at the number-one spot for a second week selling 56,000 copies. Although the album debuted at the number-one position, this was her lowest selling album since her fourth studio album, Secret. (Note: In its first week Secret sold 186,377 copies.)

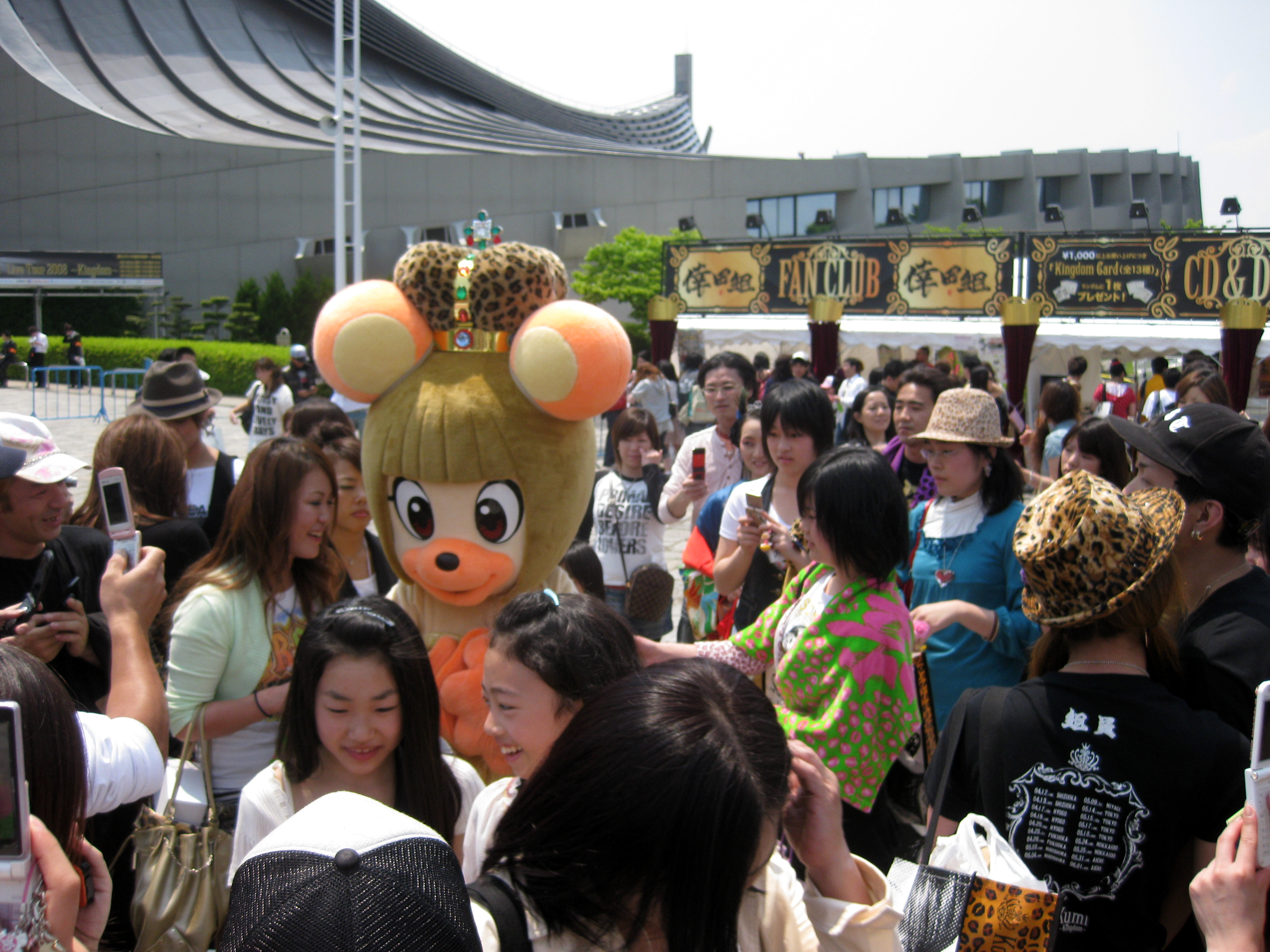
Fans attending Koda's Live Tour 2008: Kingdom in Tokyo, May 2008

On March 25, 2009, Koda released two albums, Out Works & Collaboration Best and Koda Kumi Driving Hit's. The former is a compilation of collaborations with other artists and the latter is a remix album. Out Works & Collaboration Best and Koda Kumi Driving Hit's debuted at number 7 and 6 respectively. Koda's forty-third single, "It's All Love!", was released on March 31. The single, a collaboration with her younger sister Misono, debuted atop the Oricon, making the sisters the first siblings to have a single top the chart in its initial week. The second song from the single, "Faraway", was used as the theme song for the manga-based movie Subaru. On July 8, 2009, Koda released her forty-fourth single, "3 Splash". The single debuted at number 2 on the charts making it Koda's thirty-third Top 10 single. Following the release of "3 Splash" was her forty-fifth single, "Alive/Physical Thing", which took the number-one spot on the single charts.

=== 2010–2011: Tenth anniversary, Dejavu, Japonesque, and marriage ===
On January 20, 2010, Koda released a new single titled, "Can We Go Back", which is a cover of a bonus track on Kelly Clarkson's 2009 album All I Ever Wanted. On February 3, 2010, Koda released a new best album, Best: Third Universe, and her eighth studio album, Universe, which are packaged together under the name of Best: Third Universe/Universe. On July 7, 2010, she released her 47th single, "Gossip Candy", which peaked at number 4 on the Oricon chart. On September 22, 2010, she released her 48th single "Suki de, Suki de, Suki de./Anata Dake ga", two ballads and a re-recorded version of "Walk". The DVD release of her tour "Kumi Koda Live Tour Universe" was released on October 6, 2010. A week later Koda released her first cover-album Eternity: Love & Songs, on which she covers songs from the 70s, 80s and 90s. Koda didn't release a number-one single in 2010, her first time since 2004 not to do so. On December 5, 2010, Koda held a concert celebrating her 10th Anniversary named "Fantasia", where she performed a selection of songs from all over her career. The concert was filmed for DVD release and held at Tokyo Dome.

On February 2, 2011, her 49th single "Pop Diva" was released and on February 23, 2011, Koda released "Eternity -Love & Songs- at Billboard Live" an audio DVD of her performance at Billboard Live Tokyo in October 2010, where she performed many songs from her Eternity: Love & Songs cover album. She released her ninth studio album named Dejavu on March 2, 2011. Koda was planning to release Koda Kumi Driving Hit's 3 in March, but due to the 2011 Tōhoku earthquake and tsunami, the date was pushed back to May 4. Koda is featured in the Far East Movement song "Make It Bump", which was only released on the Japanese edition of their album Free Wired. On May 18, 2011, Koda released the DVD of her "Fantasia" concert entitled "Kumi Koda 10th Anniversary: Fantasia in Tokyo Dome". Alongside DVD, the concert was also released in Blu-ray format. Her previous concerts were also re-released in Blu-ray format.

Koda's 50th single was released August 17, 2011. The single is titled "4 Times" and includes four songs as well as four music videos to accompany them (Such as her previous 2006 summer single, "4 Hot Wave"). Since it is Koda's 50th single, it was released in two different special limited edition commemorative versions. One comes with 50 Kumi Koda 50th Anniversary post cards and the other with a special digital camera. Immediately after the release of "4 Times", it was posted on her official website that her 51st single, "Ai o Tomenaide" was to be released September 21, 2011. The song charted at number 4 on the Oricon charts. On November 29, Koda became the only Japanese star to perform at the Mnet Asian Music Awards. On November 30, 2011, her 52nd single, "Love Me Back", was released, debuting at number 5 on the Oricon charts. On December 7, 2011, Koda's tenth album was announced for release on January 25, 2012. The album is entitled Japonesque and comes in four different types: CD, CD+DVD, the DVD containing music videos, a limited edition featuring a B4-size, 32-page booklet and a CD+2DVD edition which would features additional live content alongside the music videos.

On August 1, 2012, Koda released a remix album called Beach Mix, which included a new song and a new music video, titled "Whatchu Waitin' On?" This was the first release of any content since Koda gave birth. It was at this time that Koda announced a nationwide arena tour of Japan in 2014 for the album Japonesque. It was announced in August that "Go to the Top" would be released as Koda's 53rd on October 24, 2012. The single went to number 1 on the Oricon charts, her first in three years to do so. Her 54th single "Koishikute" was originally set for December 5, 2012, but was pushed back to December 26, 2012. However, it had been released on iTunes Japan the original date; and subsequently peaked at No. 7 on the Oricon chart when the physical single was finally released.

=== 2013–2016: Bon Voyage and Walk of My Life ===
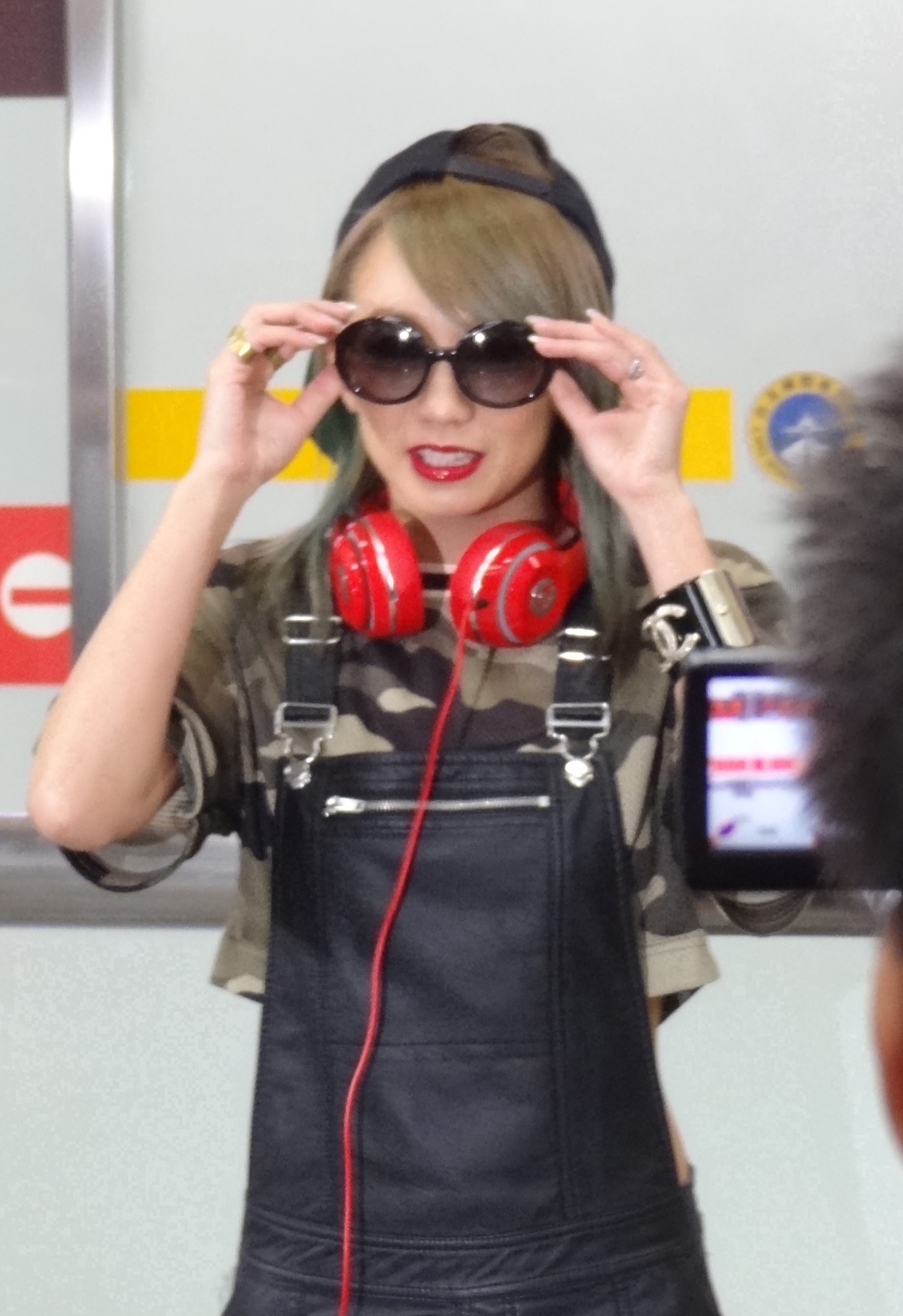
Koda at Taipei International in October 2013

In February 2013, Koda released her 2nd cover album Color the Cover fronted by a cover of late rock-singer Hide's hit "Pink Spider"; as well as other popular hits such as Kome Kome Club's "Shake Hip!" and Kenji Ozawa's "Lovely". The album peaked at No. 3 on the Oricon chart and charted for 17 weeks. Furthermore, in March, continuing the Driving Hit's series, Koda released her 7th remix album Koda Kumi Driving Hit's 5. In March, Koda embarked on a Japan-wide arena tour for the album Japonesque. Following the release of two new singles, "Summer Trip" in July 2013 and "Dreaming Now!" in November of the same year, Koda announced her 11th studio album, titled Bon Voyage which was released on February 26, 2014. This was immediately followed by the release of the 6th entry in the Driving Hit's series, her 8th remix album Koda Kumi Driving Hit's 6.

Soon thereafter, Koda embarked on the Bon Voyage Hall Tour, a series of concerts held throughout Japan to help promote the album. On August 6, Koda released her yearly summer single called "Hotel". In November of the same year, Koda became the first singer in the world to use the Oculus Rift technology to shoot the music video for her first digital single "Dance in the Rain", which coincided with the start of the 15th anniversary celebration since her debut as a singer, nicknamed 'KXVK'. This was followed by a special concert held on December 6 at Studio Coast, called the 'Koda Kumi 15th Anniversary First Class 2nd Limited Live' during which she performed 62 of her songs.

As part of her 15th anniversary celebration, Koda's 12th album, called Walk of My Life was released on March 18, 2015, followed by a Japan-wide Walk of My Life 2015 Tour supported by Mercedes-Benz. The album reached the number 1 position on the Oricon charts on its release day becoming Koda's 8th studio album to achieve this feat and continuing her trend of managing to hit the number 1 spot with her studio albums for the 8th time in a row since Black Cherry. Koda also embarked on a tour in 2016 which celebrated her 15th anniversary in the music industry.

=== 2017–2019: W Face, AND, and DNA ===
On March 8, 2017, Koda released her thirteenth album, as well as her first double album "W Face ~inside~" and "W Face ~outside~". Both albums topped the Oricon Weekly Charts at number one and number two. She was the second female artist in forty-years to hold the top two positions on the Oricon Album Charts, after Ayumi Hamasaki who released A BEST 2 in 2007. In July 2017, Koda announced her 60th single to be released in August 2017. It will be a limited release and only sold at concert venues and the Japanese music site, mu-mo. The single was the first of three planned singles released for the year, with her 61st single released in October and her 62nd single released in December. On August 2, 2017, Koda released her 61st single "LIT", and on October 4, 2017, released her 62nd single "HUSH". After the release of "Never Enough" in December, she released her fourteenth studio album AND on February 28, 2018. The album was one of two albums planned for the year, with the second album, titled DNA, released in August. DNA was promoted via a special website created by Rhythm Zone.

And debuted at number two on Oricon and dropped in ranking throughout the week to take the No. 6 slot. This became her first studio album since Secret to not take the No. 1 position. AND was predominately released for her fan club Koda Gumi, which was evidenced by her holding a fan club-specific tour for the album, titled Fanclub Tour 2018 ~AND~. Two different performances would be released: her April 29, 2018 performance at DRUM LOGOS in Fukuoka was placed on CD+3DVD edition of DNA, while her June 9, 2018 performance held at Zepp Tokyo was placed on the 4DVD edition of Live Tour 2018 ~DNA~.

Her second studio release for 2018, DNA, fared better on the charts. While it also debuted at No. 2, it remained in the top ten throughout the week, giving it the weekly ranking of No. 3. The album held a corresponding tour, Live Tour 2018 ~DNA~, which would be released on DVD and Blu-ray in March 2019. The performance utilized on the DVD and Blu-ray was of the concert performed at the Kanagawa Prefectural Hall on Koda's 36th birthday on November 13, 2018. Her eleventh remix album, Driving Hit's 9 -Special Edition-, was released on February 20, 2019, debuting at No. 24. It was released as a 3-disc set with the first disc composed of songs from her album DNA and the second and thirds discs compiled with previous remixes.

=== 2019–2023: re(Cord) and Heart ===
Beginning in July 2019, Koda began a string of digital releases, the first being "Eh Yo" released on July 3. The song was used as the Hanazono support song for the 2019 Rugby World Cup. Koda debuted the song on June 15, 2019, with a performance at Tennōji Park in Tennōji-ku, Osaka for the "100 Days To Go" event. She released two more songs in the month of July, "Summer Time" on the 10th and "Do Me" on the 17th. On July 20, 2019, Koda released a cover of Ricky Martin's hit "Livin' la Vida Loca" via Avex's official YouTube. Three weeks later on August 13, she released the song "Goldfinger 2019", which was the Japanese version of the song. Both versions received music videos with only slightly varying scenes. "Put Your Hands Up!!!" and "OMG" were released in September on the 13th and 18th respectively. The final three songs were released in October. "Strip" (October 16) and "Get Naked" (October 23) would later receive music videos, though they were only released on the 3DVD fan club edition of her Live Tour 2019 Re(live): Black Cherry/Japonesque. The final song, "Again" (October 30), was about the past and future, with the music video recalling many of her prior styles. All nine of the songs were placed on the album Re(cord), which was released on Koda 's 37th birthday on November 13. The album debuted at No. 4, where it remained for the weekly ranking. On March 11, 2020, Koda released her twelfth remix album titled Re(mix). It was released the same day as her concert DVDs/Blu-rays of Live Tour 2019 Re(live): Black Cherry and Live Tour 2019 Re(live): Japonesque.

On December 2, 2020, Koda released her first public physical non-album in over 6 years titled Angel + Monster. It became her sixth official EP since Gossip Candy and debuted at number five on Oricon. In 2022, Koda announced her 17th studio album, titled Heart, which was released on March 2, over two years after her previous studio album Re(cord) (2019). The album was released on streaming platforms a month prior to the physical release on February 2. In October 2022, Koda collaborated with band Shōnan no Kaze release the new song "Trust・Last", which was used as the opening theme of the 33rd entry of the Kamen Rider series, Kamen Rider Geats.

=== 2024–present: Unicorn ===
On January 10, 2024, Koda released her fifteenth remix album: Driving Hit's Tokyo Auto Salon 2024 Edition. On April 17, 2024, the singer released her eighteenth studio album titled Unicorn. It debuted at number nine in the Oricon Charts.

On March 26, 2025, compilation album Live in Metaverse: The Best was released. Its tracklist featured twenty-eight songs, which were voted for inclusion by Koda's official fanclub, Koda Gumi. The limited-edition version included her sixteenth remix album, Driving Hit's 10. While promoting Live in Metaverse, Koda described being under pressure to release compilation albums every five years, but that she didn't want her releases to become routine. For that reason, she worked on Live in Metaverse as a concept best-of album, requesting fans to vote on the tracks that make them "most excited to hear live".

== Artistry ==
Koda's musical style is varied; although she is known for her pop/R&B style and signature power ballads, her discography also spans to rock, hip-hop, electropop, and dance genres.

Koda has explored themes of sexuality and taboo throughout her career. While listening to the music of "But", the first thing that came to Koda's mind was homosexuality; the singer later stated in an interview: "I'm the type of person who thinks that [in a relationship] it doesn't matter what sex the other person is. No matter who they are, it doesn't change the 'I love this person' feeling, does it?" (Note: Original text from Oricon Style: 私は相手が異性であろうと同性であろうと関係ないと思うタイプなんです。相手が誰であろうと"人を愛する気持ち"に変わりはないでしょ？) The video for "Taboo" portrayed homosexuality and other "taboo" subjects to deliver the message of "these things aren't really a taboo, after all". Such themes are present in other music videos, Koda having incorporated a more sexualised image into her videos since "Crazy 4 U"; a notable example is "Juicy", censored in Taiwan due to its erotic choreography.

=== Lyrics and composition ===
"Yume no Uta" (夢のうた)
The first A-side that represents the element of sadness.

Futari de..." (ふたりで...)
The second A-side that represents the element of happiness.

Koda has written her own lyrics since the beginning of her career. (Note: Some of the lyrics are either co-written or written by others.) Koda's control over the writing of her lyrics grew with her thirty-third single; it was originally intended to be a track about "happy love", however Koda felt the melody represented both happiness and sadness. Ultimately, she rewrote the lyrics into two separate songs, remarking: "It was a first time experiment for me, but I was able to convey how happiness and sadness are two sides of the same coin." (Note: Original text: 「初めての試みでしたが、幸せと悲しみが表裏一体だってことが表現できた」) She has also stated that when she produces, she "is like a different person"; thus, she refers to herself in the third person and "looks at [herself] objectively" throughout the process. In 2025, Koda stated she only likes to release songs that she has strong feelings about.

"Milk Tea" (ミルクティー, Miruku Tii), from Black Cherry, is Koda's first composition. Her involvement in the composition stage grew during the production of her seventh studio album Trick. (Note: Koda co-composed "Bling Bling Bling", "Just the Way You Are", "That Ain't Cool" and "This Is Not a Love Song".) Koda's songwriting credits for other artists include Faky's digital single "New Age" (2019).

== Public image ==
=== Fashion ===
Koda is known for her provocative fashion and performances. In 2003, she started a noticeable trend when she appeared in advertisements wearing a metallic bra. Her work with the anime movie Cutie Honey continued this image. In 2005, she inspired the ero-kawaii and ero-kakkoii fashion styles. Koda's image noticeably influenced other artists: Ayumi Lee and Leah Dizon have credited her for inspiring the more risqué visuals in their work. In 2006, Koda began winning awards for being a trendsetter in Japan's fashion sphere, including the "Best Jeanist Award" on September 4, 2006, and the title of "Nail Queen" for her nail art on November 21, 2006, by Japan Nail Expo.

In 2006, when the popularity of Japanese singers was declining in Singapore due to the rising popularity of the Korean Wave, Koda still inspired a renewed interest in J-pop. James Kang, marketing director for Warner Music in Asia, noted that Koda's image proved to be popular with women as well as men, stating that: "(Koda Kumi) uses her image to make a feminist statement [...] She's constantly telling women to believe in themselves, and do what they want to do".

== Personal life ==
In August 2007, it was rumored that Koda was dating SMAP leader Masahiro Nakai. Despite the relationship never being publicly confirmed by either party, they were dubbed a "national couple"—a nickname last used in the early 1960s when actor Akira Kobayashi married enka singer Hibari Misora.

On December 12, 2011, Koda's official website announced that she was engaged to Kenji03 from Back-On. The two married on December 22, and Koda gave birth to the couple's first child, a son, on July 17, 2012. She announced her second pregnancy on March 30, 2026. She gave birth to her daughter on October 18, 2026.

== Philanthropy ==
In March 2011, Koda provide aid to the victims of Great East Japan earthquake and tsunami, in association with the Japan Relief Fundraising Auction. All proceeds were sent to the Japanese Red Cross.

From January 2020 to October 2021, Japan issued a "stay-at-home" order and also postponed the Tokyo Olympics due to the COVID-19 pandemic. On April 19, 2020, Kumi and her husband Kenji03 took part in the song "Be One ~Bokura ni Dekiru Koto~" (僕らにできる事 / What We Can Do), along with various other Japanese artists, including Daichi Miura, Yu Shirota, KEITA, KM-MARKIT and Micro, among others. Continuing her involvement, Koda released the song "Puff" as a digital single on June 26. That the same day, an accompanying music video was uploaded to Avex's official YouTube. In the video, Koda and several of her backup dancers perform a dance in their own respective homes, consisting of various yoga poses and lite calisthenics. An alternate version of the video was uploaded with Koda in front of a blue screen, encouraging fans to input their own backgrounds and tag the videos as "MADE93". In December 2020 amid the third COVID wave, all of Koda's new songs were recorded in her home studio, which she said gave her more opportunity to work with many Western writers and composers.

On February 15, 2021 as COVID-19 cases declined in Japan, Koda and alongside various other artists, took part in the song "My Hero ~Kiseki no Uta~" (奇跡の唄 / Miracle Song). The song was the theme song for the charity concert Live Empower Children, which was held to support childhood cancer treatment on International Childhood Cancer Day (February 15).

== Discography ==
=== Studio albums ===
- Affection (2002)
- Grow into One (2003)
- Feel My Mind (2004)
- Secret (2005)
- Black Cherry (2006)
- Kingdom (2008)
- Trick (2009)
- Universe (2010)
- Dejavu (2011)
- Japonesque (2012)
- Bon Voyage (2014)
- Walk of My Life (2015)
- W Face: Inside/Outside (2017)
- And (2018)
- DNA (2018)
- Re(cord) (2019)
- Heart (2022)
- Unicorn (2024)

=== Cover albums ===
- Eternity: Love & Songs (2010)
- Color the Cover (2013)

== Awards and achievements ==
Koda won her first award at the 47th Japan Record Awards for Butterfly on December 31, 2005, and was awarded "Triple Crown" at the Japan Gold Disc Awards on March 10, 2006, for pocketing three awards: "Pop Artist of the Year", "Pop Album of the Year", and "Music Video of the Year". She continued to win more awards for this song; on May 27, 2006, the MTV VMAJ's awarded Koda with "Best Female Video" and "Best Video of the Year" for "Butterfly", and "buzzASIA from Japan" for "Trust You", a track from her album Secret. Later in 2006, her song "Yume no Uta" from her 33rd single, "Yume no Uta / Futari de...", garnered Koda more awards. She was a Grand Prix winner at the 39th Japan Usen Grand Prize.

On May 26, 2007, Koda won three awards from MTV Video Music Awards Japan for the second year in a row. "Yume No Uta" was nominated in three categories and won "Best Female Video and "Best Video of the Year". Koda herself won a special award known as "Best Stylish Artist Award". At the 2007 Best Hit Kayōsai Koda's "Ai no Uta" earned her the Grand Prix in the pop category, also winning one of the golden awards for the 49th Nihon Record Taishō. Koda, while having success on Oricon charts with physical CD sales, maintains success on online music sales as well. It is reported that twenty-two of her music videos chart the top 100 most downloaded videos, with four of her videos dominating the top five, and having "Koi no Tsubomi" top the Overall Downloads Chart, which thirteen of her other songs chart. She has sold more than 15 million records in Japan.

Koda won the "Hottest Asian Artist" at the 2011 Mnet Asian Music Awards in Singapore. Koda and director Mika Ninagawa won the "Music Short Excellence Award, Cinematic Award" for "Pink Spider" at the Short Shorts Film Festival & Asia 2013 (abbreviation: SSFF &ASIA).

== Concert tours and live videos ==
- Koda Kumi Live Tour 2005: First Things (2005)
- Koda Kumi Live Tour 2006–2007 Second Session (2006–2007)
- Live Tour 2007: Black Cherry (2007)
- Live Tour 2008: Kingdom (2008)
- Live Tour 2009: Trick (2009)
- Live Tour 2010: Universe (2010)
- 10th Anniversary: Fantasia in Tokyo Dome (2010)
- Live Tour 2011: Dejavu (2011)
- Live Tour 2013: Japonesque (2013)
- Hall Tour 2014: Bon Voyage (2014)
- Live Tour 2015: Walk of My Life (2015)
- Live Tour 2016: Best Single Collection (2016)
- Live Tour 2017: W Face (2017)
- Live Tour 2018: DNA (2018)
- Live Tour 2019 Re(live): Black Cherry (2019)
- Live Tour 2019 Re(live): Japonesque (2019)
- 20th Anniversary Tour 2020 My Name Is... (2020)
- Live Tour 2023: Angel & Monster (2023)
- Live Tour 2024: Best Single Knight (2024)
- 25th Anniversary Tour 2025 De-Code (2025)

== Bibliography ==
- 2006: Maroc Koda Kumi Photobook (Maroc 倖田来未写真集) ISBN 978-4-8470-2942-4 – photography by Leslie Kee
  deluxe edition (2007), ISBN 978-4-8470-2953-0
- 2006: Koda-Shiki Koda Kumi Style Book (倖田式 Kumi Koda Style book) ISBN 978-4838717569
- 2009: Koda Kumi Live Tour 2009 Behind of Trick Live Book (Koda Kumi Live Tour 2009 TRICK裏 倖田来未ライブブック) ISBN 978-4847042072
- 2010: Brazil ISBN 978-4847043314 – photography by Leslie Kee, released for 10th anniversary, second photo book
  deluxe edition (2011), ISBN 978-4847043321
- 2011: Koda Reki ISBN 978-4062167628 – lifestyle book
- 2013: Koda Kumi Parparazzi!! ISBN 978-4800203953
- 2016: Bibody no Shuukan - Customs of a Beautiful Body (倖田來未流 美ボディの習慣) ISBN 978-4799319826
- 2021: WALK ISBN 978-4074494217 – photostyle book
