= W Face: Inside/Outside =

Album by Kumi Koda

- "Inside" cover art.

Studio album by Kumi Koda
- Released: March 8, 2017
- Recorded: 2016–2017
- Genre: See background and content
- Length: 43:10 (Inside); 32:49 (Outside)
- Label: Rhythm Zone
- Producer: Max Matsuura

Kumi Koda chronology
Winter of Love (2016)	W Face: Inside/Outside (2017)	Driving Hit's 7 (2017)

Singles from W Face: Inside/Outside
- 1. "Kimi Omoi" Released: August 20, 2014

Alternative cover
- Outside cover art.

W Face (pronounced Double Face) is a two-part studio album released by Japanese singer Koda Kumi. Each record is titled Inside and Outside, and Rhythm Zone released both albums on various formats on March 8, 2017. Work on W Face began after Koda completed her promotional tour for her album Walk of My Life in early 2016. Inside was produced by Japanese producers and composers, whereas Outside was crafted by a variety of producers and collaborators from outside Japan, including Dsign Music, Andrew Goldstein, Lola Blanc, and Lindy Robbins, among others.

Both Inside and Outside are concept albums; the former explores personal and emotional themes, while the latter focuses on a more aggressive and sexy depiction of the singer. Musically, Inside is J-pop-driven, with midtempo numbers and ballads, whereas Outside combines dance music, hip-hop, rock music, and R&B elements influenced by Western culture. Additionally, Koda co-wrote both albums. Both Inside and Outside received positive reviews from music critics.

Commercially, both albums were moderately successful. Outside debuted at number one on Japan's Oricon Albums Chart, while Inside stalled at second place. Despite holding the top positions, sales underperformed overall in comparison to her previous efforts. The album was promoted with two singles: "Kimi Omoi" from Inside and "Shhh!" from Outside, both of which underperformed in the Japanese market. Furthermore, Koda embarked on her 2017 W Face Live Tour, which was followed by a live CD, DVD, and Blu-ray release in December 2017.

== Background and content ==
In late January 2017, Koda Kumi and her record label Rhythm Zone announced plans to release two studio albums under the project name W Face. Titled Inside and Outside, the announcement came after Koda completed her 2016 Best Live tour and promotional activities for her previous studio album Walk of My Life (2016). Koda mentioned a track from Inside called "Yorokobi no Kakera," which was used as a commercial tie-in for Aoki Freshers in Japan, while teasing a collaboration with Japanese musicians AKLO and Chara on a track titled "Cupcake". In February, she further announced tracks "On My Way" and "Ultraviolet" appearing on Inside and Outside. According to Koda, Outside was produced first, followed by Inside. She stated that formulating Inside was "harder" than Outside, because she wanted to "work on new material" immediately. As a result, she chose to release both records in the same year.

Both Inside and Outside are concept albums; the former delves into personal and emotional themes that highlight her "softer" side, whereas the latter focuses on a more aggressive and sexy portrayal of the singer. Inside is a J-pop-driven album that mixes contemporary pop music, midtempo songs, and ballads. Koda co-wrote the majority of the album, which also includes collaborations with Back-On, Kosuke Morimoto, Shinjiro Inoue, Yoko Kuzuya, Hi-Yunk, and Chara. In an interview with Billboard Japan, Koda stated that the album's opener, "Bridget Song," discusses women's hardships, while "Promise You" expresses universal love between family, friends, and lovers.

Outside has a more "aggressive" sound and incorporates elements of dance music, hip-hop, rock, and R&B from Western music. The opening track inspired the album's project title, "W Face". Koda stated that she wanted to emphasise different depictions of womanhood in tracks such as "Bassline," "Ultraviolet," and "Wicked Girls" through her lyrics. Additionally, the album songs "Insane" and "Bassline" both feature freestyle rapping. Unlike its pairing record, all tracks except "Cupcake" were arranged by various producers and collaborators outside of Japan, including Dsign Music, Andrew Goldstein, Lola Blanc, and Lindy Robbins.

== Release ==
W Face was released on March 8, 2017, by Rhythm Zone in a variety of formats. Ten different tracks appeared on Inside and Outside, while a DVD and Blu-ray Disc on each version included the same music videos; these visuals were for the songs "Ultraviolet", "Insane", "Bassline", "Wicked Girls", "Bridget Song", and "Promise You". In Taiwan, Avex Trax distributed the CD and DVD versions of Inside and Outside on March 22. In Japan, first-press editions of both albums included slipcase packaging, additional leaflets about Koda's promotional activities, and a B2-sized poster of the album artwork. The album artwork for both records shows close-up shots of Koda; Inside features her making a "mild" expression, whereas Outside features a greyscale portrait of her with heavy makeup. Each edition have slightly different shots of Koda.

== Promotion ==
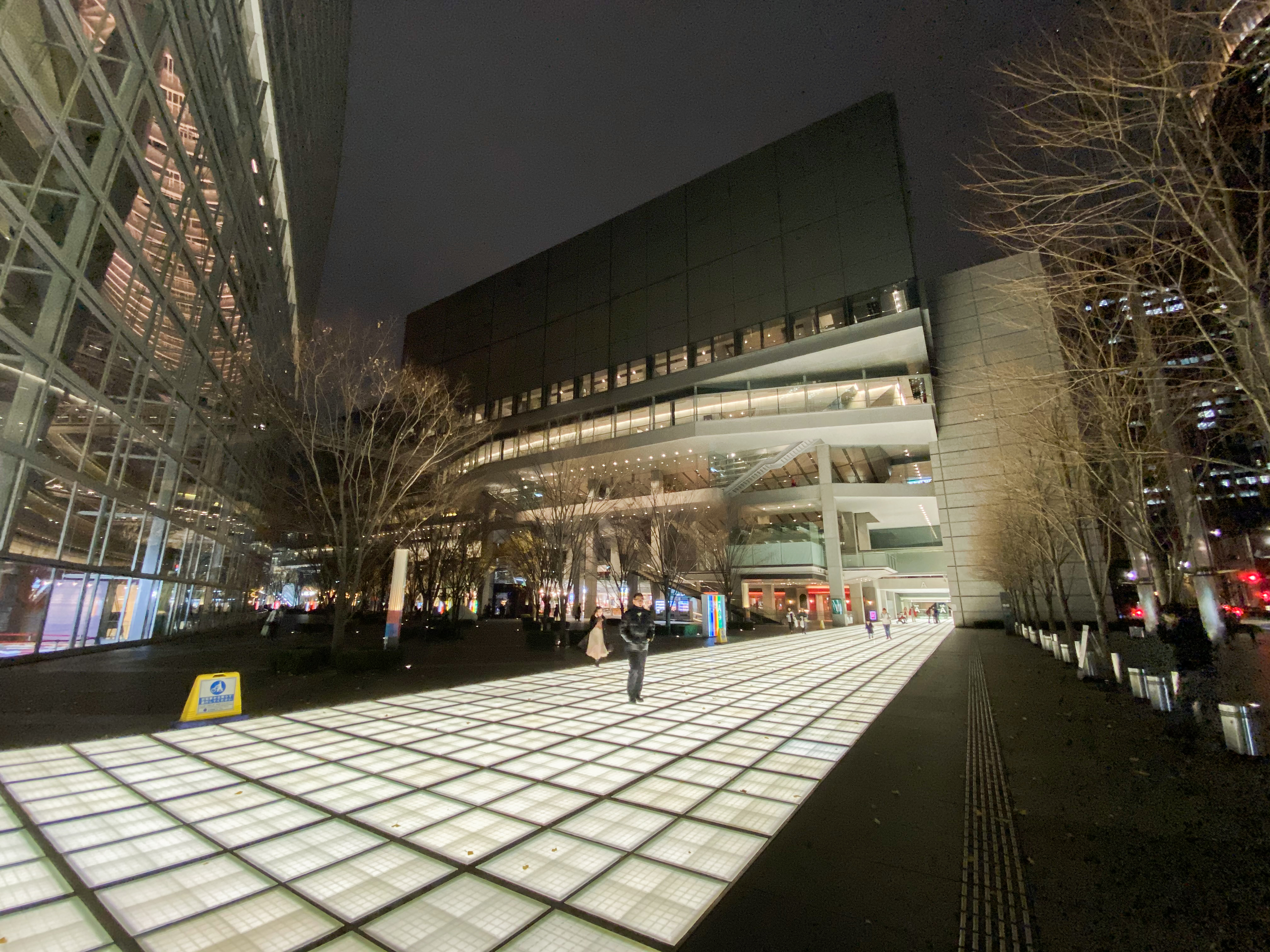
The W Face Live Tour, which promoted material from W Face, was filmed at the Tokyo International Forum at Hall A (pictured).

W Face produced two singles from both albums: "Kimi Omoi" from Inside and "Shhh!"" from Outside. The former track first appeared on Koda's mini-album Fever: Legend Live, which was distributed exclusively in promotional campaigns for the Pachinko game of the same name. A music video was also included with the mini-album's DVD release. Because it was included on the mini-album and not released separately, it served as a B-side to "Shhh!".

"Shhh!" was the album's only physical single, released on April 9, 2016, by Rhythm Zone. It was distributed exclusively through Mu-Mo, a shop run by Rhythm Zone's parent company Avex Trax, and was also available during Koda's Best Single Collection Live Tour in 2017. "Shhh!"'s packaging was available in four different variations, all of which were exclusive to concert venues. Each edition featured unique cover art that, when aligned, revealed a hidden image. In addition, a special barcode was available on all four formats, which included an exclusive mobile download from SP Music in Japan. Tracks from W Face were promoted on various live shows. She appeared on Utacon on January 31 and Music Fair on February 25, where she sung "On My Way", the theme song to the Japanese television series Mahiru no Akuma (Midday Devil / 真昼の悪魔) (2017). She also promoted the track "Promise You" on Good Time Music and Utacon in mid-March 2017.

Several tracks from Inside and Outside were remixed by various producers and DJs and included on Koda's remix album, Koda Kumi Driving Hit's 7, which was released a month later on April 6. To promote the album further, Koda embarked on her W Face Live Tour in 2017, visiting all prefectures in Japan; the tour concluded on January 28, 2018. A live recording and film were shot at the Tokyo International Forum and released on December 6, that year. The DVD and Blu-ray releases debuted at number four on the Oricon DVD Chart and remained there for twelve weeks.

== Reception ==
Professional ratings
Review scores
Source	Rating
CDJournal	(positive)
CDJournal	(positive)

W Face received favourable remarks from music critics. Japanese magazine CDJournal reviewed both albums separately. The publication praised Inside's "down-to-earth" and "supple" production, citing tracks "Yorokobi no Kakera" and "My Fun" as album standouts. Outside complimented Koda's attitude throughout the album, as well as its R&B sound. The reviewer also praised Koda's vocals on the album track "Heartless" and praised its distinct piano-driven sound in comparison to the rest of the album.

Commercially, W Face was a moderate success in Japan. Outside debuted at number one on the Oricon Daily and Weekly Albums Chart, selling 20,246 copies in its first week, while Inside debuted and stalled at number two, selling 20,157 copies. On the Oricon Digital Chart, the positions were reversed, with Inside selling 1,200 units and Outside selling 1,000 digital copies. Despite ranking first and second in Japan, it was her lowest-performing album at the time, selling significantly less than her previous release Walk of My Life (2016). Inside spent nine weeks on the chart, while Outside lasted ten weeks. On the Billboard Japan Hot Albums chart, Inside debuted at number two, while Outside peaked at number three. Both Inside and Outside have shipped over 28,000 units in Japan.

== Track listing ==
W Face: Inside track listing
No.	Title	Writer(s)	Composers(s)	Length
1.	"Bridget Song"	Hi-yunk	Hi-yunk; UTA	3:59
2.	"Bring It On"	Koda; Back-On	Back-On	3:08
3.	"Yorokobi no Kakera" (喜びのかけら / Piece of Joy)	Koda; Kosuke Morimoto	Shimada Masanori	4:26
4.	"Stand By You"	Koda	Hi-yunk; UTA	5:49
5.	"Sukideshite" (好きでして / I Like You)	Koda; Shinjiro Inoue	Inoue	3:55
6.	"Kimi Omoi" (君想い / Your Thoughts)	Koda; Yoko Kuzuya	Sayala; Mitsuki Shiokawa; Yoko Kuzuya	5:17
7.	"On My Way"	Koda	Ryuji Yamamoto	4:42
8.	"What's Up"	Koda	Katsuhiko Yamamoto	3:20
9.	"Promise You"	Koda; Hi-yunk	Hi-yunk	4:38
10.	"My Fun"	Koda	Chara	4:02

W Face: Outside track listing
No.	Title	Writer(s)	Composers(s)	Length
1.	"W Face"	Koda	Andrew Goldstein; Jesse St. John; Lola Blanc	3:17
2.	"Ultraviolet"	Koda	Valeria Del Prete; Sean Alexander	3:43
3.	"Insane"	Koda	Anne Judith Stokke Wik; Ronny Vidar Svendsen; Che Pope; Claus Holm; Rewan Riko	3:11
4.	"Damn Real"	Koda	Avalanche; Ryohei Yamamoto	4:15
5.	"Heartless"	Koda	Lindy Robbins; Emanuel Kiriakou; Shanna Crooks	3:18
6.	"Bassline"	Koda	Wik; Svendsen; Nermin Harambasic; Pope; Claus Holm	3:18
7.	"Shhh!"	Koda	Sellers	3:17
8.	"Bangarang"	Koda	Viktoria Hansen; Levi Lennox	3:24
9.	"Wicked Girls"	Koda	Yuka Otsuki	2:41
10.	"Cupcake" ((featuring AKLO))	Koda; AKLO	Dylan Kelly	2:13

W Face DVD/Blu-ray
No.	Title	Length
1.	"Ultraviolet" (music video)	3:50
2.	"Insane" (music video)	3:19
3.	"Bassline" (music video)	3:26
4.	"Wicked Girls" (music video)	2:46
5.	"Bridget Song" (music video)	4:01
6.	"Promise You" (music video)	4:43
Total length:		21:25

== Personnel ==
Personnel details were sourced from the Inside and Outside liner notes booklet.

Visuals and imagery

- Toshiyuki Suzuki - art direction
- Katsutoshi Yasuhara - film director
- Kohei Takeda - film producer
- Jun Hirota - graphic designer
- Ryoji Imaizumi - hairstylist
- Kouta - makeup artist
- Tisch - photographer
- Kazuyo Shinato - stylist

Musicians

- Kumi Koda - vocals
- Naoki Ikumoto - guitar
- AKLO - vocals
- Back-on - guitar
- Hideki Matsubara - bass
- Yasuo Sano - drums
- Yoshiaki Kanoh - guitar
- Masanori Shimada - piano
- Hiroo Yamaguchi - bass
- Udai Shika - cello, strings
- Tom Tamada - drums
- Hi-yunk - guitar
- Yoko Oki - violin
- Ryota Imamura - bass
- Hiroomi Shitara - guitar
- Motoaki Fukanuma - guitar
- Yuki Saito - piano
- Mitsuki Shiokawa - piano
- Shinjiroh Inoue - guitar
- Taizo Nakamura - bass
- Tadashi Iwamaru - drums
- Toshiyuki Takao - drums
- Fire - bass
- Sammy - guitar
- Chara - keyboards, vocals

Technical and production

- Koda Kumi - songwriting
- Andrew Goldstein - producer, composer, songwriter
- Jesse St. John - songwriter
- Lola Blanc - songwriter
- Sean Alexander - producer, songwriter
- Valeria Del Prete - songwriter
- Anne Judith Wik - songwriter
- Che Pope - songwriter
- Claus Holm - songwriter
- Rewan Riko - songwriter
- Ronny Svendsen - songwriter
- Avalanche - composer, producer
- Ryohei Yamamoto - composer
- Emanuel Kiriakou - producer, songwriter
- Lindy Robbins - songwriter
- Shanna Crooks - songwriter
- Jamie Sellers - producer, songwriter
- Nicole Simpson - songwriter
- Levi Lennox - songwriter
- Viktoria Hansen - ssongwriter
- Yuka Otsuki - songwriter
- Dylan Kelly - songwriter
- AKLO - songwriting
- Hi-yunk - arranger, composer, songwriter
- UTA - arranger
- Makoto Yamadoi - studio recorder, mixer
- Back-on - songwriter, composer, arranger
- D.O.I. - mixer
- Kosuke Morimoto - songwriter
- Toshiro Kai - mixer
- Kosuke Morimoto - composer
- Atsushi Hattori - studio recorder
- Shinjiroh Inoue - songwriter, composer
- Yoko Kuzuya - songwriter, composer
- Sayala - composer
- Ryuji Yamamoto - composer
- Kenichi Asami - arranger
- Yoshiyuki Minegishi - mixer
- Katsuhiko Yamamoto - composer
- Chara - songwriter, producer, arrangement
- Satomi Nanseki - mixer
- Keiji Tanabe - mixer

== Charts ==
Chart (2017: Inside)	Peak position
Japanese Albums (Billboard)	2
Japanese Albums (Oricon)	1
Japanese Digital (Oricon)	6

Chart (2017: Outside)	Peak position
Japanese Albums (Billboard)	3
Japanese Albums (Oricon)	1
Japanese Digital (Oricon)	7

== Release history ==
Region	Date	Format(s)	Label	Ref.
Japan	March 8, 2017	CD; DVD; Blu-ray; digital download; streaming	Rhythm Zone	
Various	March 8, 2017	Digital download; streaming	Avex Trax	
Taiwan	March 22, 2017	CD; DVD; digital download; streaming	Avex Taiwan	

== See also ==
- List of Oricon number-one albums of 2017
