= Best of Soulhead: 5th Anniversary Tour =

Video by Soulhead
- Released: 11 November 2007
- Recorded: 2007
- Genre: R&B; hip hop
- Label: Sony Music Entertainment Japan; Onenation
- Producer: Soulhead

Soulhead chronology
Soulhead Tour 2006: Naked (2006)	Best of Soulhead: 5th Anniversary Tour (2007)

Best of Soulhead: 5th Anniversary Tour (stylized as 5th Anniversary tour "BEST OF SOULHEAD") is Soulhead's second concert DVD and third DVD overall. The tour coincided with their album Best of Soulhead and consisted of twenty-four songs performed at each location. The concert placed on the DVD was performed at Zepp Tokyo on May 27, 2007. During the tour, each sister performed a new song: Yoshika performed YOSHIKA Solo and Tsugumi performed Street Walking during her rap medley.

The DVD charted at number 77 on Oricon and remained on the charts for two weeks.

== Track listing ==
1. "Theme of Soulhead"
2. "At the Party"
3. "Step to the New World"
4. "Get Up!"
5. "Lover, Knight, Man"
6. "Got to Leave"
7. "No Way"
8. "You Can Do That"
9. "Kimi no Kiseki" (キミノキセキ)
10. "Itsumademo..." (いつまでも...)
11. "Yoshika Solo"
12. "Playboy"
13. "A Pretense of Love"
14. "Itsudemo Kimi no Koto wo" (いつでも君のことを)
15. "Tsugumi Solo" (Rap Medley: "Street Walking" / "Whachagonado?" / "D.O.G" / "To Da Fake MCs" / "Woo!" / "Too Late" / "Stay There")
16. "Soulhead Is Back"
17. "Fiesta"
18. "XXX"
19. "Feel Like Jumping"
20. "Pray"
21. "Sparkle Train"
22. "Oh My Sister"

Encore

23. "Dear Friends"
24. "Sora" (空))
