= Best of Soulhead =

Greatest hits album by Soulhead
- Released: February 21, 2007
- Recorded: 2003–2007
- Genre: R&B, hip hop
- Label: SMEJ

Soulhead chronology
Re-Construct Album Vol.2 Crystallized (2006)	Best of Soulhead (2007)	Soulhead (2010)

Singles from Best of Soulhead
- 1. "Kimi no Kiseki/Itsumademo..." Released: December 6, 2006; 2. "Dear Friends" Released: January 24, 2007

Best of Soulhead is the first greatest hits album by Soulhead. It was their last album under the Sony Music Entertainment Japan sub-label onenation before moving to Avex. The album peaked at #5 on Oricon and remained on the charts for thirteen weeks.

== Information ==
Best of Soulhead was released a year after their studio album, Naked, and was their last album under the SMEJ's sublabel Onenation.

The album was released in both CD and CD+DVD format, with the CD+DVD being of limited edition. It also received a special "Winter Sleeve" limited edition.

The album contained previously unreleased music videos for "One More Time", "I'm Just Going Down" and "Feel Like Jumping".

== Track listing ==
Adapted from Amazon

=== CD ===
1. "Step to the New World"
2. "Lover, Knight, Man"
3. "Oh My Sister"
4. "Sora"
5. "Get Up!"
6. "You Can Do That"
7. "No Way"
8. "At the Party"
9. "Fiesta"
10. "Sparkle Train"
11. "Got to Leave"
12. "Pray"
13. "XXX" featuring Koda Kumi
14. "Kimi no Kiseki"
15. "Itsumademo..."
16. "Dear Friends"
17. "Feel Like Jumping"

=== DVD ===
1. "Step to the New World" (music video)
2. "Lover, Knight, Man" (music video)
3. "Sora" (music video)
4. "I'm Just Going Down" (music video)
5. "Get Up!" (music video)
6. "You Can Do That" (music video)
7. "No Way" (music video)
8. "At the Party" (music video)
9. "Fiesta" (music video)
10. "Sparkle Train" (music video)
11. "Pray" (music video)
12. "XXX" featuring Koda Kumi (music video)
13. "Furusato" (music video)
14. "One More Time" (music video)
15. "Kimi no Kiseki" (music video)
16. "Itsumademo..." (music video)
17. "Dear Friends" (music video)
18. "Feel Like Jumping" (music video)
