= List of Japanese hip-hop musicians =

This is a list of Japanese hip-hop musicians and artists.

== Rappers and crews ==
(in alphabetical order)

- Afra
- Ai
- Awich
- Bennie K
- Chanmina
- chelmico
- CREAM
- Creepy Nuts
- Dohzi-T
- Dragon Ash
- East End X Yuri
- Halcali
- Heartsdales
- Hi-Timez
- Hifana
- Hilcrhyme
- Hime
- Home Made Kazoku
- Ilmari
- K Dub Shine
- Ken the 390
- Ketsumeishi
- Kick the Can Crew
- King Gidora
- Kohei Japan
- KOHH
- Kreva
- M-Flo
- Matsushita Yuya
- Mellow Yellow
- Mihimaru GT
- Miliyah Kato
- Miss Monday
- nobodyknows+
- @onefive
- Rhymester
- Rip Slyme
- Ryofu Karma
- Scha Dara Parr
- Seamo
- Shakkazombie
- Shing02
- Sky-Hi
- Soulhead
- Soul'd Out
- Soul Scream
- Sphere of Influence
- Steady & Co.
- Teriyaki Boyz
- Tha Blue Herb
- Uzi
- Verbal
- Wise
- WON (rapper)
- Ya-kyim
- Yurika
- Zeebra

== DJs and producers ==
- Cradle
- Dabo
- Hiroshi Fujiwara
- DJ Honda
- DJ Kentaro
- DJ Krush
- Mihara
- DJ Muro
- DJ Okawari
- Nigo
- Nujabes
- Silent Poets

== See also ==
- Japanese hip hop
- Music of Japan
