= Soulhead Tour 2006: Naked =

Video by Soulhead
- Released: 9 August 2006; 22 November 2006 (Blu-ray)
- Recorded: 2006
- Genre: R&B, hip hop
- Label: Sony Music Entertainment Japan
- Producer: Soulhead

Soulhead chronology
Oh My Sister Live & Clips (2003)	Soulhead Tour 2006: Naked (2006)	Best of Soulhead: 5th Anniversary Tour (2007)

Soulhead Tour 2006: Naked (stylized as SOULHEAD tour 2006 "Naked") is Soulhead's second DVD and first concert DVD. The tour was in correspondence with their 2006 album Naked, and was their first tour. The version on the DVD was performed at SHIBUYA-AX. The DVD also contained an alternate music video for One more time, which was previously released on the album.

It was released on both DVD and Blu-ray.

== Track listing ==
1. "Birth" (Intro)
2. "Fiesta"
3. "Got to Leave"
4. "Don't U Think?"
5. "Yume no Uchi"
6. "Forgive Me"
7. "Itsudemo Kimi no Koto wo"
8. "Step to the New World"
9. "At the Party"
10. "Nature" (Interlude)
11. "Touch" (Interlude)
12. "Whachagonado?"
13. "XXX"
14. "One More Time"
15. "Sparkle Train"
16. "Furusato"
17. "Anata"
18. "Pray"
19. "Sora"
20. "One More Time" (special additional clip)
