= Re-Construct Album Vol.2 Crystallized =

Re-Construct Album Vol.2 "Crystallized"

Remix album by Soulhead
- Released: June 21, 2006
- Recorded: 2004–2006
- Genre: dance
- Labels: Sony Music Entertainment Japan; Onenation

Soulhead chronology
Naked (2006)	Re-Construct Album Vol.2 "Crystallized" (2006)	Best of Soulhead (2007)

Re-Construct Album Vol.2 "Crystallized" (stylized as RE-CONSTRUCT ALBUM Vol.2 「CRYSTALLIZED」) is the second remix album by Japanese duo Soulhead. Like their previous remix album, the songs were dance remixes of some of their past songs. It charted better than its predecessor, coming in at number 41 on Oricon and remaining on the charts for four weeks.

== Track listing ==
1. "Sparkle Train" (worked by Mark de Clive-Lowe)
2. "At the Party" ~reworked by Octopussy)
3. "You Can Do That" (worked by Reel People)
4. "Got to Leave" (worked by Gota Yashiki)
5. "Fiesta" (worked by PE'Z)
6. "For All My Ladies" (worked by Icedown)
7. "XXX" featuring Koda Kumi (worked by Sa-Ra)
8. "Whachagonado?" (worked by D.O.I)
9. "Pray" (worked by Kenny Dope)
10. "No Way" (worked by DJ Mitsu The Beats)
11. "One More Time" (reworked by Octopussy)
12. "Furusato" (worked by Seikou Nakaoka)
