= Re-Construct Album Vol.1 Reflection =

Re-Construct Album Vol.1 「Reflection」

Remix album by Soulhead
- Released: September 26, 2003
- Recorded: 2002–2003
- Genre: EDM
- Label: Sony Music Entertainment Japan; AICL-1479 (Japan)

Soulhead chronology
Oh My Sister (2003)	Re-Construct Album Vol.1 「Reflection」 (2003)	Braided (2004)

Re-Construct Album Vol.1 "Reflection" (stylized as RE-CONSTRUCT ALBUM Vol.1 「REFLECTION」) is the first remix album by Japanese duo Soulhead. The album was constructed of EDM remix of some of their past songs and included famous Japanese DJs DJ Watarai and DJ Masterkey. It came in at #89 on Oricon before quickly falling off the charts.

The remix of Moon Shine featured rapper Aaron Blackmon, who had worked with Soulhead before, when they were known as "Batti Baas," for the single Lovin' You.

== Track listing ==
Official track list

=== CD ===
1. "Step to the New World ~OCTOPUSSY remix~"
2. "Too Late ~DJ WATARAI remix~"
3. "Lover, Knight, Man ~D.O.I+OCTOPUSSY remix~"
4. "Break Up ~DJ MASTERKEY remix~"
5. "Song For You ~DJ HIROnyc remix~"
6. "Oh My Sister ~OCTOPUSSY remix~"
7. "To Da Fake MCs ~D.O.I remix~"
8. "Moon Shine feat. Aaron Blackmon ~Dogggystyle remix~"
9. "Playboy ~SAIGENJI remix~"
10. "Sora ~Tomita Lab.remix~"
