= Oh My Sister Live & Clips =

Video by Soulhead
- Released: 8 October 2003
- Recorded: 2002–2003
- Genre: hip hop, R&B
- Label: SMEJ; AIBL-9070 (Japan)

Soulhead chronology
Oh My Sister Live & Clips (2003)	Soulhead Tour 2006: Naked (2006)

Oh My Sister Live & Clips (stylized as Oh My Sister LIVE & CLIPS) is the first DVD released by female duo Soulhead.. The DVD contains the PVs that correspond to their singles from their debut album Oh My Sister. Along with the PVs, content also includes their July 22, 2003 performance of Get Up!, which was performed at SHIBUYA-AX.

== Track listing ==
(Official Track List)

=== DVD ===
1. "Step to the New World" (Music Video)
2. "Lover, Knight, Man" (Music Video)
3. "Sora" (Music Video)
4. "I'm just going down" (Music Video)
5. "Get Up!" (2003.07.22 @SHIBUYA-AX)
