= 2003 MTV Video Music Awards Japan =

Annual Japanese music awards ceremony

- Date: May 25, 2003
- Location: Saitama Super Arena, Saitama, Saitama, Japan
- Hosted by: Zeebra and Nana Katase
- Website: mtvjapan.com/mvaj

Television/radio coverage
- Network: MTV Japan

The MTV Video Music Awards Japan 2003 were hosted by hip hop artist Zeebra and pop singer and actress Nana Katase.

== Awards ==
Winners are in bold text.

=== Video of the Year ===
Rip Slyme — "Rakuen Baby"

- Eminem — "Without Me"
- Avril Lavigne — "Complicated"
- Mr. Children — "Hero"
- Hikaru Utada — "Sakura Drops"

=== Album of the Year ===
Chemistry — Second to None

- Eminem — The Eminem Show
- Avril Lavigne — Let Go
- Rip Slyme — Tokyo Classic
- Hikaru Utada — Deep River

=== Best Male Video ===
Craig David — "What's Your Flava?"

- Eminem — "Without Me"
- Ken Hirai — "Ring"
- Tamio Okuda — "Man wo Jishite"
- Justin Timberlake — "Like I Love You"

=== Best Female Video ===
Hikaru Utada — "Sakura Drops"

- Avril Lavigne — "Complicated"
- Jennifer Lopez featuring Styles P and Jadakiss — "Jenny from the Block"
- Misia — "Back Blocks"
- Ringo Shiina — "Kuki (Stem)"

=== Best Group Video ===
Rip Slyme — "Rakuen Baby"

- Blue — "One Love"
- Bon Jovi — "Everyday"
- Mr. Children — "Hero"
- Oasis — "Little By Little"

=== Best New Artist ===
Avril Lavigne — "Complicated"

- Ashanti — "Foolish"
- Minmi — "The Perfect Vision"
- t.A.T.u. — "All The Things She Said"
- The Music — "The People"

=== Best Rock Video ===
Red Hot Chili Peppers — "By the Way"

- Coldplay — "In My Place"
- Dragon Ash — "Fantasista"
- Foo Fighters — "All My Life"
- Sum 41 — "Still Waiting"

=== Best Pop Video ===
Blue — "One Love"

- BoA — "Valenti"
- Ayumi Hamasaki — "Real Me"
- Mr. Children — "Hero"
- Justin Timberlake — "Like I Love You"

=== Best R&B Video ===
Crystal Kay — "Girl U Love"

- Ashanti — "Foolish"
- Chemistry — "My Gift to You"
- Craig David — "What's Your Flava?"
- TLC — "Girl Talk"

=== Best Hip-Hop Video ===
Rip Slyme — "Funkastic"

- Eminem — "Without Me"
- Missy Elliott — "Work It"
- King Giddra — "F.F.B."
- Nelly — "Hot in Herre"

=== Best Dance Video ===
Supercar — "Yumegiwa Last Boy"

- Kylie Minogue — "Come Into My World"
- Moby — "We Are All Made of Stars"
- Sketch Show — "Turn Turn"
- Underworld — "Two Months Off"

=== Best Video from a Film ===
Eminem — "Lose Yourself" (from 8 Mile)

- Beyoncé — "Work It Out" (from Austin Powers in Goldmember)
- King Giddra — "Generation Next" (from Madness in Bloom)
- Madonna — "Die Another Day" (from 007 Die Another Day)
- Supercar — "Yumegiwa Last Boy" (from Ping Pong)

=== Best Collaboration ===
Suite Chic featuring Firstklas — "Good Life"

- Eve featuring Alicia Keys — "Gangsta Lovin'"
- Crystal Kay featuring Sphere of Influence and Sora — "Hard to Say"
- Nelly featuring Kelly Rowland — "Dilemma"
- Rhymester featuring Crazy Ken Band — "Nikutai Kankei part 2"

=== Best Live Performance ===
Kick The Can Crew

- Craig David
- Exile
- Eve
- Suite Chic

== Special award ==
=== Legend Award ===
Run DMC

== Live performances ==
- 175R
- Blue
- Chemistry
- Craig David
- Eve
- Crystal Kay
- M-Flo
- Rip Slyme
- Run DMC
- Sketch Show
