= Detroit Metal City =

Japanese manga series and its adaptations

- First tankōbon volume cover, featuring Soichi Negishi as Johannes Krauser II

デトロイト・メタル・シティ (Detoroito Metaru Shiti)
- Genre: Black comedy; Musical; Parody
- Manga
- Written by: Kiminori Wakasugi
- Published by: Hakusensha
- English publisher: NA: Viz Media
- Magazine: Young Animal
- Original run: September 22, 2005 – April 23, 2010
- Volumes: 10
- Original video animation
- Directed by: Hiroshi Nagahama
- Studio: Studio 4°C
- Licensed by: NA: Sentai Filmworks
- Released: August 8, 2008
- Runtime: 13 minutes
- Episodes: 12
- Live-action film
- Directed by: Toshio Lee
- Produced by: Genki Kawamura
- Written by: Mika Ōmori
- Music by: Takayuki Hattori
- Studio: Toho
- Released: August 23, 2008
- Runtime: 105 minutes
- icon

Detroit Metal City (Japanese: デトロイト・メタル・シティ, Hepburn: Detoroito Metaru Shiti) is a Japanese manga series written and illustrated by Kiminori Wakasugi. It was serialized in Hakusensha's seinen manga magazine Young Animal from September 2005 to April 2010, with its chapters collected in ten tankōbon volumes. The manga was licensed for English release in North America by Viz Media. The series takes its name from the song "Detroit Rock City" by the American band Kiss.

The manga was adapted into a twelve-episode (of thirteen minutes long and divided into two six-minute sections) original video animation (OVA) released in August 2008; a live action film adaptation also premiered in Japan in August 2008.

== Plot ==
Soichi Negishi is a shy young musician who dreams of a career in pop. Dreams do not pay the bills, so he has ended up as the lead singer and guitarist of a blackened death metal band, "Detroit Metal City". In his stage costume, he adopts the persona of "Johannes Krauser II", a terrorist demon from hell said to have raped and killed his parents. The songs of DMC often encourage their audience to engage in similar immoral and illegal behavior, or tell stories of Krauser's criminal exploits in a parody of the genre.

Negishi despises DMC and all that it stands for, but he cannot walk away from his role as the band's psychotic frontman. Under his meager exterior, Negishi is a rageaholic and also is very skilled at guitar playing. Furthermore, he feels obligation to the rest of the band and his label and is always roped back in by the manager of the band's label. The Krauser persona also functions as an outlet to vent his frustration over his failing personal career, which has not advanced beyond playing his original pop songs in the streets and earning the harsh disapproval of bystanders.

Negishi is envious of the popularity DMC and his Krauser persona have achieved in contrast to the music he actually wants to play being ridiculed; his Krauser persona begins to emerge more often, which leads to Krauser's popularity growing. The series explores the attempts of Negishi to break this vicious circle, escape his DMC persona, and become a successful pop musician.

== Characters ==
Soichi Negishi (根岸 崇一, Negishi Sōichi) / Johannes Krauser II (ヨハネ・クラウザーII世, Yohane Kurauzā Nisei)
Voiced by: Daisuke Kishio (Soichi Negishi), Yūji Ueda (Johannes Krauser II)
Portrayed by: Kenichi Matsuyama
A calm and peaceful musician from Inukai, Ōita, he is a fan of Swedish pop and Shibuya-kei who is the exact opposite of his alter-ego "Johannes Krauser II", leader of the Visual death metal band DMC (short for Detroit Metal City). Ashamed of his true job, Negishi must cope with DMC's rising fame while keeping it a secret from friends and family. Even though Negishi despises Krauser so much, he can never resist the temptation of invoking his demonic ego every time he feels irritated or in trouble. While performing as Krauser, Negishi proves to be a very skilled guitarist, able to play just with his teeth.
Yuri Aikawa (相川 由利, Aikawa Yuri)
Voiced by: Masami Nagasawa
Portrayed by: Rosa Kato
Negishi's friend from his college times and his main love interest. She loves Negishi's calm nature and songs, but dislikes DMC's music and its vocalist Krauser, unaware that they are the same person.
Terumichi Nishida (西田 照道, Nishida Terumichi)/Camus (カミュ, Kamyu)
Voiced by: Makoto Yasumura
Portrayed by: Ryuji Akiyama
Curry-loving, overweight, and taciturn. An otaku, he is a fan of ecchi anime. Nishida is "Camus" (カミュ, Kamyu), DMC's drummer. Perhaps the most dedicated in the group; not even fire or snakes will stop his drumming.
Masayuki Wada (和田 真幸, Wada Masayuki)/Alexander Jagi (アレキサンダー・ジャギ, Arekisandā Jagi)
Voiced by: Yuto Nakano
Portrayed by: Yoshihiko Hosoda
Wada plays the part of "Alexander Jagi", DMC's bassist and a ladies' man from Saitama. He would like to leave DMC to perform in a visual kei band, but like the rest of the band, he is reluctant to go on his own path, mostly in fear of their manager.
Death Records President (デスレコーズ社長, Desu Rekōzu Shachō)
Voiced by: Ai Kobayashi
Portrayed by: Yasuko Matsuyuki
A foul-mouthed, sex-crazy blonde woman who creates odd schemes to promote the band, most of them to Negishi's despair.
Keisuke Nashimoto (梨元 圭介, Nashimoto Keisuke)
Voiced by: Takashi Matsuyama
A masochistic middle-aged man hired to perform during DMC's concerts as the "Capitalist Pig" (資本主義の豚, Shihonshugi no Buta), whose role is to let himself be abused by Krauser. He works part-time at a convenience store.
Jack ill Dark (ジャック・イル・ダーク, Jakku iru Dāku)
Voiced by: Riki Takeuchi, Eugene Nomura (#12)
Portrayed by: Gene Simmons
Also known as "The Emperor", he is a legendary Death Metal guitarist from the United States who chose to crush DMC during his farewell concert in Japan. But after inadvertently bringing out Negishi's anger, he ends up being upstaged by Krauser, and thus passes down to him his trademark instrument, a legendary guitar covered in blood, and his title as "Emperor".

== Media ==
=== Manga ===
Written and illustrated by Kiminori Wakasugi, Detroit Metal City was first published in Hakusensha's seinen manga magazine Young Animal as a one-shot on April 22, 2005. The series takes its name from the song "Detroit Rock City" of the American rock band Kiss. Detroit Metal City was later serialized in Young Animal, where it ran from September 22, 2005, to April 23, 2010. Hakusensha collected its chapters in ten tankōbon volumes, released from May 29, 2006, to July 29, 2010.

In North America, the manga was licensed for English release by Viz Media. The ten volumes were published from June 9, 2009, to September 13, 2011.

==== Volumes ====
No.	Original release date	Original ISBN	English release date	English ISBN
1	May 29, 2006	978-4-592-14351-2	June 9, 2009	978-1-4215-2742-0
2	October 27, 2006	978-4-592-14352-9	September 29, 2009	978-1-4215-2743-7
3	April 27, 2007	978-4-592-14353-6	December 8, 2009	978-1-4215-2744-4
4	November 29, 2007	978-4-592-14354-3	March 9, 2010	978-1-4215-2745-1
5	March 28, 2008	978-4-592-14355-0	June 8, 2010	978-1-4215-2746-8
6	August 8, 2008	978-4-592-14356-7	September 14, 2010	978-1-4215-2926-4
7	February 13, 2009	978-4-592-14357-4	December 14, 2010	978-1-4215-3256-1
8	September 29, 2009	978-4-592-14358-1	March 8, 2011	978-1-4215-3683-5
9	March 29, 2010	978-4-592-14359-8	June 14, 2011	978-1-4215-3849-5
10	July 29, 2010	978-4-592-14360-4	September 13, 2011	978-1-4215-3940-9

=== Original video animation ===
A twelve-episode (of thirteen minutes long and divided into two six-minute sections) original video animation (OVA) animated by Studio 4°C was released on DVD on August 8, 2008. In North America, the OVA was licensed by Sentai Filmworks. It was released on DVD on October 2, 2012, and on Blu-ray on December 16, 2014.

==== Episodes ====
- 1 – PV / Sick Murderer
- 2 – Real Legend / Satan
- 3 – Pig / Drug
- 4 – Frustration / Good Song
- 5 – Masochist / Family
- 6 – Punk 1 / Punk 2
- 7 – Tower / Confession
- 8 – Promise / Alternation
- 9 – Cinema 1 / Cinema 2
- 10 – Fake / Detroit-Moe-City
- 11 – Hip-hop 1 / Hip-hop 2
- 12 – Emperor 1 / Emperor 2

=== Film ===
In November 2007, it was announced that the manga would be adapted into a live action film distributed by Toho. The film was directed by Toshio Lee and stars Kenichi Matsuyama as Souichi Negishi/Johannes Krauser II. The film premiered in Japan on August 23, 2008.

The film was screened in Canada at the 33rd Toronto International Film Festival' Midnight Madness Program on September 5, 2008. It was also shown in the United Kingdom at the 22nd Leeds International Film Festival in November 2008; in the United States at the American Film Market event in November 2008; and in Australia in 2009 at the 13th Japanese Film Festival; in Sydney on November 27 and in Melbourne on December 6. In North America, Viz Pictures announced that they had licensed the film in July 2010; it was released on DVD on November 9 of the same year.

=== Music ===
A tribute album for the series, titled Detroit Metal City: Tribute to Krauser II the metal mix (デトロイト・メタル・シティ トリビュートアルバム〜生贄メタルMIX〜, Detoroito Metaru Shiti: Toribyūto Arubamu ~Ikenie Metaru MIX~; Detroit Metal City Tribute Album: Sacrifice Metal Mix) was released on March 28, 2008. It features Japanese recording artists covering their own songs in a metal style. The album has thirteen songs by Beat Crusaders; Kaela Kimura; Scha Dara Parr; Midori; YUKI; monobright; Tommy February^{6}; Mucc; King Giddra; Electric Eel Shock; ANA; Wagdug Futuristic Unity; and Kahimi Karie.

As a fictional band, Detroit Metal City has released several real records for both the film and the OVA series, under the Death Records label, named after the manga's fictional label. Two singles, sung by Tetsuya Kanmuri as Johannes Krauser II and Hideki Kaji as Soichi Negishi were released; "Satsugai/Amai Koibito ~for the movie~" (SATSUGAI/甘い恋人〜for the movie〜; "MURDER/Sweet Lover ~for the movie~") was released on August 6, 2008; "Maō/Raspberry Kiss ~for the movie~" (魔王/ラズベリーキッス〜for the movie〜, Maō/Razuberī Kissu Fō za Mūbī) was released on August 13 of the same year. Three other singles performed by other artists were released on August 13, 2008; "Detarame Mothe-com Cherry Boy ~for the movie~" (デタラメ・マザコン・チェリーボーイ〜for the movie〜, Detarame Mazakon Cherībōi ~for the movie~) by Kintama Girls; "From New York City ~for the movie~" (フロムNYシティ〜for the movie〜, Furomu NY Shiti ~for the movie~) by K Dub Shine (as MC Kiva); and "Sally my Love ~for the movie~" (サリーマイラブ〜for the movie〜, Sarī Mai Rabu ~for the movie~) by Hideki Kaji (as Tetra-pot Melon Tea). These five singles and five other songs were included on the album Makai Yūgi ~for the movie~ (魔界遊戯〜for the movie〜; Hell Game ~for the movie~), released on August 20, 2008.

=== Canceled video game ===
D3 Publisher was producing a game based on the series for the Nintendo DS, titled Detroit Metal City DS: Death Shout (デトロイト・メタル・シティDS～デス・シャウト～, Detoroito Metaru Shiti DS Desu Shauto), that would feature multiple modes of play, including an Elite Beat Agents-inspired rhythm game and a RPG mode. It was set to be released in August 2008; however, the game was never released.

== Reception ==
The manga has had over 3 million copies in circulation. It topped the Takarajimasha's Kono Manga ga Sugoi! 2007 list of best manga for male readers.
