= B Boy =

A b-boy is a person devoted to breaking or break dancing.

B Boy may also refer to:

== Music ==
- "B-Boy", a song by Tech N9ne featuring Big Scoob, Bumpy Knuckles, Kutt Calhoun, and Skatterman from the album K.O.D., 2009
- "B Boy" (song) by Meek Mill (2015)
- B-Boy Park, an annual Japanese hip hop festival
- B-Boy Records, an independent hip hop record label
- B Boys (band), a UK male vocal/instrumental pop group

== Other ==
- B-Boy (wrestler), the ring name of Benjamin Cuntapay (born 1978)
- B-Boy, a video game for PlayStation 2 and PSP

== See also ==
- Planet B-Boy, a 2007 documentary film
- "B Boy Baby", a song written by Mutya Buena (2006)
- B-girl (disambiguation)
- Beastie Boys, an American hip hop group
