= Soulhead (album) =

Studio album by Soulhead
- Released: February 24, 2010
- Recorded: 2009–2010
- Genre: R&B, hip hop
- Label: Avex; AVCD-23951 (Japan, CD)

Soulhead chronology
Best of Soulhead (2007)	Soulhead (2010)	Jump Up the Wall (2011)

Soulhead is the first self-titled album by Soulhead. It is their first album under the Avex label, having previously been under Sony Music Entertainment Japan's sub-label onenation. It became their second lowest charting album, only reaching #40 on Oricon and staying on the charts for four weeks.

== Information ==
Soulhead is the female duo's first original studio album since 2006's Naked and is their first album under the Avex label. They were previously under Sony Music Entertainment Japan.

This is also their first album to not contain any preluding singles, which may have been one of the factors in the album's low ranking. The album was only released in CD format with none of the songs containing music videos.

The album is predominantly R&B and hip hop.

Oh her official blog, Yoshika apologized for the four-year wait and thanked those who worked hard to bring the album and the fans who were still there.

== Track listing ==
(Official Track List)

=== CD ===
1. "Show Time"
2. "Whatever"
3. "Cosmic Walking"
4. "9Dayz"
5. "Limit Pistols" (限界ピストルズ / Genkai PISUTORUZU)
6. "New Kicks"
7. "confession"
8. "Plunder"
9. "The Battle Of..."
10. "All My Dreamer"
11. "Fantasy"
12. "Pass the love"
13. "Okina sekai no chiisana bokura" (大きな世界の小さな僕ら / Small us in the big world)
