= World of Music (Zeebra album) =

Studio album by Zeebra
- Released: October 17, 2007
- Genre: Japanese Hip Hop
- Length: 66 minutes
- Label: Pony Canyon

Zeebra chronology
The New Beginning (2006)	World of Music (2007)

Professional ratings
Review scores
Source	Rating
Allmusic	3.5/5 stars

World of Music is the sixth studio album released by Japanese hip hop artist Zeebra. It features appearances from Jesse (lead singer of Rize) and Miliyah Kato. The album was on the Japanese charts for six weeks peaking at number 11.

== Track listing ==
1. World Of Music(intro)
2. Unmei (運命)
3. Reason(Let U Know) feat. Simon & D.O.
4. Top Of The World
5. Back Stage Boogie feat. Bes, 56 5 & Uzi
6. Not Your Boyfriend feat. Jesse (Rize)
7. We Leanin’
8. Shinin’ Like A Diamond feat. Sphere of Influence&May J.
9. Stop Playin’ A Wall
10. This Is 4 The Locos feat. DS455&Big Ron
11. 360° feat. OJ Flow, KM-Markit, Aktion, Braidz, Gotz & Uzi
12. Lyrical Gunman
13. Everybody Needs Love
14. My People feat. Miliyah Kato
15. Kumo no Ue no Heaven (雲の上のHeaven)
16. Last Song
