= Jump Up the Wall =

Studio album by Soulhead
- Released: September 28, 2011
- Recorded: 2010–2011
- Genre: R&B, hip hop
- Label: Avex; AVCD-38324 (Japan, CD, CD+DVD)

Soulhead chronology
Soulhead (2010)	Jump Up the Wall (2011)	My Anthem (2013)

Jump Up the Wall (stylized as JUMP UP THE WALL) is the second album by Soulhead under the Avex label. It is their fifth studio album and sixth overall. It became their lowest charting album, peaking at No. 73 on Oricon and staying on the charts for three weeks.

== Information ==
Jump Up the Wall was released over a year since their last studio album, Soulhead, and was their second album under the Avex label. They were previously under Sony Music Entertainment Japan's sublabel onenation. The album was released in both CD and CD+DVD format.

Much like Soulhead, Jump Up the Wall did not carry any preluding singles; however, it did consist of one music video on the DVD: World Go Round, which featured Japanese reggae artist, lecca.

The album is predominantly R&B and hip hop.

Jump Up The Wall was the duo's final album to date.

== Track listing ==
=== CD ===
1. "S.S.S" (Introduction)
2. "NO NO NO"
3. "Jump Up the Wall"
4. "Life"
5. "Higher! Higher! Higher!" (Interlude)
6. "ASHITA"
7. "World Go Round" featuring lecca
8. "I'm in love"
9. "novem" (Interlude)
10. "Fallin'"
11. "Himawari" (向日葵 / Sunflower)
12. "letter"
13. "Stories of life" (Interlude)
14. "I know"
15. "Walk With Me"

=== DVD ===
1. "World Go Round" featuring lecca (Music Video)
2. "Behind the SOULHEAD" (Off-Shot)
