= My Anthem =

Studio album by Yoshika
- Released: July 3, 2013
- Recorded: 2013
- Genres: R&B, hip hop
- Labels: Avex; YZDI-10101 (Japan, CD)
- Producer: Aki Hishikawa

Yoshika chronology
Jump Up the Wall (2011)	My Anthem (2013)	My Anthem: Sympathetic Resonance (2014)

My Anthem is the debut solo album by Soulhead singer Yoshika. The album reached No. 286 on the Oricon charts in a one week stay on the chart. The album was only released as a CD.

== Information ==
My Anthem is Yoshika's debut studio album. Yoshika collaborated with DSSENT, a company that produces ball caps, so those who purchased the album received a DSSENT cap. For the album, she worked closely with producer Aki Hishikawa, SMAP and singer/actress Mika Nakashima. Takuto Tanaka, known for working on dramas for NHK, produced the music video I Dream for the album.

On her official blog, Yoshika said she was nervous for the release of her first solo album, but she was also excited. She thanked those that helped produce the album and fans who supported her and purchased the album. A remixed version of the album titled My Anthem: Sympathetic Resonance was released the following year.

== Track listing ==
(Official Track List)

1. "Opening My Anthem"
2. "All I Do"
3. "The Glow of Love"
4. "Thriller"
5. "Mama Used to Say"
6. "Natural Lady"
7. "I Dream"
8. "All I Want Is U"
9. "Right Here [Human Nature Remix]"
10. "A Long Walk"
11. "Time After Time"
12. "Change the World"
13. "I Dream [Makoto's 80s Legacy Remix]
