= B-Boy Park =

Japanese hip hop festival

B-Boy Park was a Japanese hip hop festival that took place every year in Tokyo. It was free admission and open to the public. A prominent player on the Japanese hip hop scene, Crazy-A, organized the annual hip hop festival in Yoyogi Park in 1999. It was a celebration of hip hop music, dance, fashion and culture.

At its inaugural event, American break dancer Crazy Legs, judged the dance competition. However, he was not completely satisfied with the overall performance of Japanese break dancers. He commented that they needed to focus more on footwork, and less on "power moves".

Author Ian Condry notes that the festival was extremely important to a hip hop scene that many doubted could even exist: “Up until the mid-nineties, people who worked in the entertainment world pointed to hip hop’s rootedness in African American communities as a reason to doubt its possible takeoff in Japan, where different understandings of race, language, and social class prevail.”

The festival drew rappers, b-boys and girls, and hip hop fans from all corners of Japan, representing a plethora of styles that reflect the richness and diversity of the Japanese hip hop scene. The festival was discontinued in 2017.

== See also ==
- List of hip hop music festivals
