= Hime (rapper) =

Japanese hip hop artist (born 1979)

Hime (姫; literally, "princess") born 1979 is a Japanese hip hop artist who released her debut solo album Hime hajime in October 2003 and is part of DJ Honda's studio. Her works are notable for their use of Japanese cultural themes, including tanka metre and sampling of kabuki and bunraku narrations. Her works also often touch on themes of female empowerment; she describes herself as the voice of the "Japanese doll". One example of the incorporation of traditional Japanese poetry and contemporary hip hop can be heard in the song Tateba shakuyaku or Standing, she's a peony

"this sound,
giri and ninjo
the spirit of harmony
will the surprise attack
come from the peony"

In the chorus of the song, as seen above, Hime writes in a thirty-one-syllable tanka.

Hime's embrace of the ancient form of poetry in her rapping, as well as her frequent use of Japanese cliches and traditional rhythms, show a trend in some Japanese hip hop to localize at the same time that they are embracing a global musical form. "Hime's use of Japanese cliches is provocative in a club setting where the latest slang from MTV tends to be most valued". Yet she also uses rhyme, something imported, since Japanese does not have much of a structure for rhyming.

At the same time that she is embracing aspects of Japanese culture into her hip hop, we also see how Hime presents herself. Often in her videos she is dressed in ways that are clearly taken from American, and specifically hip hop, culture. She appeared at the BET Hip Hop Awards 2008.

Hime's songs "Ukina", "Black List", "Himehajime 2006", "In The Rain" and "Fuyajo" are featured in The Fast and the Furious for the PlayStation 2 and PlayStation Portable.

== Discography ==
- Hime hajime (姫始; literally, "Hime's first" or "First sex of the year"); released 8 October 2003
- Ukina (浮き名; literally, "Scandal"); released 10 November 2004
- Hitogoyomi (一暦); released 12 April 2006

== See also ==
- Japanese hip hop
- Hime's MySpace Page
