= Soul Scream =

Japanese hip hop group

- Origin: Japan
- Genre: Japanese hip hop
- Years active: 1994–
- Labels: Pony Canyon; Polystar (former)
- Members: Hab I Scream (MC) E.G.G.MAN (MC) Mr. Beats a.k.a DJ Celory (DJ)
- Past members: ALG (MC); Shiki (MC)

Soul Scream are a Japanese hip hop group formed in 1994. They are regarded as one of the pioneering acts in the Japanese hip hop scene.

== History ==
Soul Scream were formed in 1994, consisting of rappers Hab I Scream, E.G.G.MAN and DJ Celory. They released their debut album THE "DEEP" in 1996, featuring appearances from other hip hop acts Zeebra, K Dub Shine and Rhymester. The album is widely regarded as an essential album in the Japanese hip hop scene. Their single Hachi to Chou (蜂と蝶), released in 2000 is also viewed as an all-time classic song in the genre. They went on to release an EP titled TOu-KYOu in 1997 followed by two more albums, The Positive Gravity: ~案とヒント~ in 1999 and Future is Now in 2002. They then went on an 18-year hiatus while all pursuing solo careers until releasing the single "Love, Peace & Happiness" in 2020 followed by more singles over the years. These include "TOu-KYOu 2021" (2022), a revised version of their 1997 single of the same name, again featuring the likes of Zeebra, K Dub Shine and Rhymester, "DNA" (2022), and "Boomerang" (2023) featuring pop singer Pushim.

== Discography ==
=== Studio albums ===
- The "DEEP" (1996)
- The Positive Gravity: ~案とヒント~ (1999)
- Future is Now (2002)

=== EPs ===
- TOu-KYOu (1997)

=== Live albums ===
- Tour 2002 Future is Now with Osaka Monaurail & Special Guests (2002)

=== Singles ===
- "TOu-KYOu" (1997)
- "Vibe / All Day" (1998)
- "ひと夜のバカンス / 恋のバランス / ワード スクリーマーズ" (2000)
- "蜂と蝶" (2000)
- "あした Future is Now" (2002)
- "緑の森" (feat. Yoyo-C) (2002)
- "Love, Peace & Happiness" (2020)
- "TOu-KYOu 2021" (feat. Zeebra, K Dub Shine, Rhymester & DJ Oasis) (2022)
- "DNA" (feat. SHAMO & 輪入道) (2022)
- "Boomerang" (feat. Pushim) (2023)

=== DJ Mixes ===
- "The Positive Energy" (2000)
