= Kohei Japan =

Kohei Japan is a Japanese hip hop emcee and a member of the Japanese rap group, Mellow Yellow. Born in Yokohama, Japan, he discovered rap and hip hop while working as a chef.

Many of his songs illustrate the contrasts between his Japanese culture and Western hip hop influences. In his song "Hungry Strut", he proclaims that he eats "rice, not bread, and fish, not meat", thereby asserting that while he is a member of the hip hop culture, he remains Japanese. He shows his attachment to Japanese culture by wearing a traditional kimono in many of his appearances. On his album "The adventures of Kohei Japan", he appears on the cover as a kabuki character in a woodblock print. On the album cover, his hands make the universal "funk" sign, showing the contrast between traditional Japan and hip hop culture.

== Discography ==
=== Albums ===
- The Adventures of Kohei Japan (File Records, 2000)
- Funky 4 U (Sony Music Japan, 2003)
- Family (Pony Canyon, 2008)

=== Singles ===
- "Together Forever" (Sony Music Japan, 2003)
