= Anime and hip-hop =

Anime in hip-hop is the amalgamation of anime and hip-hop. Many rappers have been influenced by anime in lyrics and production. Hip-hop has also influenced anime.

== Anime's influence on hip-hop ==
Rappers and artists such as RZA, Kanye West, Robb Bank$, and Frank Ocean have taken inspiration from anime when creating their music.

Akira was called one of the first influences to hip-hop culture. A music video that features clips from Akira is the 1995 song titled "Scream" performed by Michael Jackson and Janet Jackson. Kanye West has also cited Akira as a major influence on his work, West paid homage to the film in the "Stronger" music video. Lupe Fiasco's album, Tetsuo & Youth, is named after Tetsuo Shima.

Dragon Ball Z has had an impact on hip-hop culture. It has been referenced in numerous hip-hop songs by rappers and artists such as Chance the Rapper, Big Sean, Lil Uzi Vert, Childish Gambino, Soulja Boy, Drake, Frank Ocean, XXXTentacion, Juice Wrld, and Trippie Redd.

American rapper Lil Uzi Vert owns several cars decorated with anime characters (also known as Itasha), including one with characters from K-On! and Sword Art Online. He's frequently mentioned anime throughout his discography and has even dedicated song names to anime characters, with a notable one being "Sasuke", who, Lil Uzi Vert cited as his favorite character from the Naruto franchise.

Megan Thee Stallion is a rapper influenced by anime. She has been seen cosplaying, such as when she went to Japan's Summer Sonic Festival where she wore a Sailor Moon inspired costume. Having anime inspired nails, which can be seen all over her instagram. During a shoot for Paper Magazine, she dressed up as Shoto Todoroki from the anime My Hero Academia. She has her own merch line with Crunchyroll, celebrating Naruto. She was also a presenter at the 8th Crunchyroll Anime Awards.

American singer and rapper The Weeknd took major influence from anime, and has even sampled anime themes into his music with a notable example being the theme from Neon Genesis Evangelion. He was also the presenter of awards at the 10th Crunchyroll Anime Awards.

== Hip-hop's influence on anime ==
The growth of the Internet has provided Western audiences with easy access to Japanese content. This influenced many anime creators to incorporate more Western culture in their productions. The Western market has influenced the creation of many popular hip-hop inspired anime titles such as Afro Samurai, Samurai Champloo, Tokyo Tribes, and PaRappa the Rapper.

Afro Samurai is an example of hip-hop influence on anime the accompanying musical stylings of RZA of the Wu-Tang Clan, allow the viewer to dive deep into understanding the concepts behind the anime.

== See also ==
- Anime-influenced animation
- Japanese hip-hop
- Alternative hip-hop
