= Inside Out (Soulhead song) =

Single by Batti Baas

from the album N/A
- Released: 6 February 2002 (JP)
- Recorded: 2002
- Genre: R&B, Hip hop
- Label: TOKUMA
- Songwriter(s): Batti Baas

Batti Baas singles chronology
"Lovin' You" (2001)	"Inside Out" (2002)	"Step to the New World" (2002)

Inside Out is Batti Baas' second single, released a year after their first single, Lovin' You.

== Information ==
Inside Out was released as standard CD and only carried the title track and its instrumental. The single was produced under the Tokuma label. Their previous single was released under Handcut Records. The lyrics were written by both Yoshika and Tsugumi of Batti Baas.

This was the last single released under the pseudonym Batti Baas, whereas, after the release, they were picked up by Sony Music Entertainment Japan and took on the name Soulhead. They would study overseas in New Zealand and Australia for a year to perfect their English. Their first single released under the name "Soulhead" would be out six months later, titled Step to the New World.

== Track List ==
CD

1. "Inside Out"
2. "Inside Out" (Instrumental)
