= Oh My Sister (Remix)/I'm Just Going Down =

"Oh My Sister (Remix)"/"I'm Just Going Down"

Single by Soulhead

from the album Oh My Sister
- Released: July 7, 2003
- Recorded: 2003
- Genre: J-pop, R&B
- Label: Sony Music Entertainment

Soulhead singles chronology
"Sora" (2003)	"Oh My Sister (Remix)"/"I'm Just Going Down" (2003)	"GET UP! ep" (2003)

"Oh My Sister (Remix)/I'm Just Going Down" is the fourth single by Japanese female duo Soulhead, released under Sony Music Entertainment Japan. It reached #114 on the Oricon charts and charted for three weeks.

== Information ==
"Oh My Sister (Remix)/I'm Just Going Down" was released on both CD and vinyl. Despite having both song titles in the name, the A-side was "I'm Just Going Down". The song was omitted from the corresponding album, Oh My Sister, but the music video was placed on the DVD Oh My Sister Live & Clips.

"I'm Just Going Down" was written and composted by Soulhead and is a song about falling for someone who ends up leaving you, but how you stay strong and keep moving forward.

== Track listing ==
=== CD ===
(Source)

1. "Oh My Sister" (remix)
2. "I'm Just Going Down"
3. "Oh My Sister" (remix; instrumental)
4. "I'm Just Going Down" (instrumental)

=== 12" vinyl ===
Side A

1. "Oh My Sister" (remix)
2. "Oh My Sister" (remix; instrumental)
3. "Oh My Sister" (remix; a cappella)

Side B

1. "I'm Just Going Down"
2. "I'm Just Going Down" (instrumental)
3. "I'm Just Going Down" (a cappella)

== Charts ==
Chart performance for "Oh My Sister (Remix)"/"I'm Just Going Down"
Chart (2003)	Peak position
Japan (Oricon)	28
