= K Dub Shine =

- Born: Kōta Kagami (各務貢太); May 8, 1968 (age 58)
- Origin: Tokyo, Japan
- Genre: Japanese hip hop
- Occupation: Rapper
- Years active: 1993–present
- Labels: Atomic Boom; Avex; P-Vine; SMEJ
- Website: https://web.archive.org/web/20080331105158/ http://www.atomicbomb.co.jp/kdub/index.html

Kōta Kagami (各務貢太, Kagami Kōta; born May 8, 1968), known professionally as K Dub Shine(Kダブシャイン), is a Japanese rapper.

== Early life ==
Kagami was born in the Shibuya ward of the city of Tokyo, Japan. As a child, he was quite sickly and was in and out of hospital. It was said that he may not live to see his first day of primary school. He dropped out of high school and studied abroad in a high school in Florida, the United States. Upon returning to Japan he joined Temple University, Japan Campus but dropped out again. In the late 1980s he discovered hip-hop in the United States. Although he believed that the Japanese language was not fit for rapping, he changed from rapping in English to Japanese, after a friend questioned his decision to not use his own language.

== Career ==
He formed the acclaimed hip-hop group King Giddra, alongside fellow rapper Zeebra and producer DJ Oasis in 1993. By the late 1990s, K Dub Shine had created his own record label and had become a big force in the Japanese underground hip hop scene. Many of his lyrics seek to depict accurately and without bias the reality of Japanese youth culture. He has done multiple collaborations with Soul Scream in his career, and has also featured on RGTO by AKLO, which has surpassed 26 million view on YouTube as of 2024. In 2011, in response to the Tōhoku earthquake and tsunami, her performed a charity gig alongside King Giddra to raise money for the victims.

== Political views ==
K Dub Shine has expressed negative and critical views towards the United States In multiple songs such as "Why So Much?", he is critical of the use of the English language by Japanese rappers. He uses his Instagram account to express his political views, including criticisms of the president of Ukrainian Volodymyr Zelenskyy, the Israeli government and what he calls a genocide against Palestinians in Gaza and towards transgender people and the BLM movement.

== Discography ==
=== Albums ===
- Genzai Jikoku (現在時刻) (1997)
- Ikiru (生きる) (2000)
- Riyuu (理由) (2004)
- Jishu Kisei (自主規制) (2010)
- Shin Nihonjin (新日本人) (2016)

=== EPs ===
- Jiko Hyougen (自己表現) (2006)
