= Soulhead =

Japanese musical duo

- Origin: Ebetsu, Hokkaido, Japan
- Genres: Urban contemporary; J-pop
- Years active: 2002–2013
- Labels: Sony Music Associated Records (former) onenation (former); Avex Group (former)
- Past members: Yoshika; Tsugumi

Soulhead was a Japanese urban contemporary/R&B duo consisting of sisters Yoshika Sawayama (よしか) and Tsugumi Sawayama (つぐみ). Both were born in Hokkaidō; Yoshika was born on July 20, 1978, and Tsugumi was born on January 25, 1981. They worked with several well-known artists, including Sowelu, Koda Kumi, Crystal Kay and Ken Hirai.

== Biography ==
Before they assumed the name Soulhead, Yoshika and Tsugumi were known as Batti Baas. Batti Baas released one vinyl single through Handcuts Records called Lovin' You, which featured Aaron Blackmon. The song was a remake of the Minnie Riperton standard. In February 2002, they released a CD single through Tokuma Japan Communications called Inside Out.

Shortly after the release of Inside Out, they were signed to Sony Music Associated Records and began working under the pseudonym Soulhead. The label sent them one year abroad to Australia and New Zealand to improve their proficiency in English. They released their debut single, Step to the New World, on August 21, 2002. In 2006 they were transferred to Sony Music Associated Records' sublabel, onenation. They appeared on various compilations with other Japanese artists. Soulhead's sound was a blend between various genres, such as soul, hip-hop, R&B, dancehall, reggae and funk, with many of their lyrics in English. They usually worked with the production team known as Octopussy. They also worked on releases with other Japanese artists, such as Kumi Koda and Soul'd Out. Yoshika is also a renowned songwriter, who has worked with artists such as Sowelu, Ken Hirai and Crystal Kay.

On February 21, 2007, they released a greatest hits album called Best of Soulhead, which contained all of their singles released up to Naked, along with a few b-sides. On February 24, 2010, after a four-year hiatus, they released a new album titled Soulhead under Avex Group, which they transferred to from SMEJ. On September 28, 2011, the duo released their second Avex album, Jump Up the Wall. This has been their final release to date.

Yoshika released her first solo album on July 3, 2013, titled My Anthem, which consisted of twelve new songs and one remix. Six months later, she released another album: a remix album compiled of remixes from My Anthem.

As of March 2016, their Avex site was unavailable.

Yoshika is the singer of alternative band Free But Sharp Pain, first formed in 2014. They have released one EP, Fall Into Reverie, in 2022.

Since 2014, Tsugumi performs with fellow rapper Luna as hip hop duo MaryJane, releasing one album called Street Names in 2014 and an EP, Two, in 2016, via Luna's own label Lilbooty Recordings. Tsugumi released her first solo album on May 18, 2016, titled LUVPLATE, on the Lilbooty Recordings label. She released two solo songs in 2019, "Nail Gossip" and "Braid My Hair", and an EP titled Laid Back in 2021. It was announced in their official blog that Yoshika gave birth to a baby. In 2022 she hosted a radio show on FM Karatsu.

== Influences ==
Some musical artists who they respect are Tupac Shakur, Snoop Dogg, The Beatles, Janis Joplin, Takuro Yoshida and Ice Cube.

== Albums ==
=== Studio albums ===
1. Oh My Sister
  Rank: #3 / Sold: 214,545
  March 5, 2003
2. Braided
  Rank: #4 / Sold: 139,992
  April 28, 2004
3. Naked
  Rank: #5
  March 8, 2006
4. Soulhead
  Rank: #40
  February 24, 2010
5. Jump Up the Wall
  Rank: #73
  September 28, 2011

=== Best albums ===
1. Best of Soulhead
  Rank: #5
  February 21, 2007

=== Remix albums ===
1. Re-Construct Album Vol.1 Reflection
  Rank: #89 / Sold: 9,602
  September 26, 2003
2. Re-Construct Album Vol.2 Crystallized
  Rank: #41
  June 21, 2006

=== Yoshika solo albums ===
1. My Anthem
  Rank: #286
  July 3, 2013
2. My Anthem: Sympathetic Resonance
  January 22, 2014

=== Tsugumi solo albums ===
1. Luvplate
  May 18, 2016
2. Laid Back EP
  September 24, 2021

== Singles ==
=== Standard singles ===
(Source)

1. "Lovin' You feat. Aaron Blackmon" (Batti Baas)
  January 7, 2001
2. "Inside Out" (Batti Baas)
  June 2, 2002
3. "Step to the New World"
  Rank: #24 / Sold: 59,287
  July 24, 2002 (12")
  August 21, 2002 (CD)
4. "Lover, Knight, Man"
  Rank: #36 / Sold: 18,410
  November 20, 2002
5. "Sora"
  Rank: #28 / Sold: 16,035
  February 5, 2005
6. "Oh My Sister (Remix)/I'm Just Going Down"
  Rank: #114 / Sold: 2,561
  May 2, 2003
7. "Get Up! EP"
  Rank: #28 / Sold: 15,967
  July 30, 2003
8. "You Can Do That"
  Rank: #36 / Sold: 18,691
  January 21, 2004
9. "No Way"
  Rank: #50 / Sold: 5,353
  March 24, 2004
10. "At the Party"
  June 2, 2004
11. "Fiesta"
  Rank: #35 / Sold: 7,773
  May 25, 2005
12. "Sparkle Train/Got to Leave"
  Rank: #30 / Sold: 15,324
  December 14, 2005
13. "Pray/XXX feat. Koda Kumi"
  Rank: #22 / Sold: 10,109
  January 27, 2006
14. "Kimi no Kiseki/Itsumademo..."
  Rank: #56
  December 6, 2006
15. "Dear Friends"
  Rank: #60
  January 24, 2007

=== 12" analog singles ===
(Source)

1. "Too Late" [DJ Watarai remix]/Song For You [DJ Hironyc remix]
  August 20, 2003
2. "Break Up" [DJ Masterkey remix]/Playboy [Saigenji remix]
  August 20, 2003
3. "To Da Fakes MCs"
  September 10, 2003
4. "Lover, Knight, Man" [D.O.I.+Octopussy remix]/Moon Shine feat. Aaron Blackmon [Doggystyle remix]
  September 10, 2003
5. "Sparkle☆Train" - produced by Mark de Clive-Lowe / You can do that - produced by Reel People
  July 13, 2006
6. "XXX" - produced by SA-RA / "Pray" - produced by Kenny Dope
  July 13, 2006

== DVDs ==
1. Oh My Sister Live & Clips
  October 8, 2003
2. Soulhead Tour 2006: Naked
  August 9, 2006
3. Best of Soulhead: 5th Anniversary Tour
  November 11, 2007

== Collaborative efforts and featured artist ==
1. "Ryuusei no Sadoru" (流星のサドル / Meteor of the Saddle) (February 25, 2004)
  from album Soul Tree ~a musical tribute to toshinobu kubota~
2. "Like a Queen" February 23, 2005)
  from single "Like a Queen feat. Soulhead" / Tomita.Lab
3. "D.D.D feat. Soulhead" (December 21, 2005)
  from album BEST ~second session~ / Koda Kumi
4. "Home party feat. Tsugumi of Soulhead" (August 1, 2007)
  from the album おたくgirlsの宴 / lecca
5. "Beauty and the Beast" (September 26, 2007)
  from the album Tribute to Celine Dion
6. "Love Majic feat. Luna, Tsugumi of Soulhead, and Jamosa" (July 28, 2010)
  from the album Power Butterfly / lecca
7. "Round Mirror Moon feat. Yoshika" (October 2, 2010)
  from the album 攻め燃える (Burning Attack) / Jabberloop
8. "Natural High feat. Tsugumi" (October 2, 2010)
  from the album 攻め燃える (Burning Attack) / Jabberloop
9. "Slow Motion feat. Tsugumi" (May 18, 2011)
  from the album OPEN THE DOOR / Hiroko
10. "Dreamers feat. Tsugumi" (October 26, 2011)
  from the album BEHIND the TRUTH / Nerdhead
