= Ian Condry =

American anthropologist

Ian Condry (born 1965) is a cultural anthropologist and author. He graduated from Harvard University in 1987 with a B.A. in Government and received his Ph.D. in Anthropology from Yale University in 1999. He is currently a Professor of Japanese Cultural Studies at Massachusetts Institute of Technology in Cambridge, Massachusetts.

In his first ethnographic book entitled Hip-Hop Japan: Rap and the Paths of Cultural Globalization, Condry explores issues of race, gender, language, musical history, and contemporary cultural politics, all as they relate to the Japanese rap music scene. He argues that performance sites, such as recording studios and nightclubs, are the specific paths that lead to cultural globalization. Condry believes that by viewing such locations more closely, we can then understand the specific dialogue that occurs between global/local, producer/consumer, and artist/industry.

His second book, The Soul of Anime: Collaborative Creativity and Japan's Media Success Story, explores the questions, who makes anime and what makes it a global success. Based on fieldwork in Tokyo anime studios such as Madhouse, Gonzo, Aniplex and Studio 4C, the book examines the process of making Japanese animation. He describes screenwriting meetings, toy design sessions, and fan practices in an effort to show that solitary genius is less important than cross-industry collaborations. In addition, the work of fans, including fansubbers who are often regarded as simply pirates, are also integral to the dynamics that lead to the global spread of Japanese animation.
