= Dear Friends (song) =

Single by Soulhead

from the album Best of Soulhead
- Released: 24 January 2007 (JP)
- Recorded: 2007
- Genre: Pop, R&B
- Label: Sony Music Entertainment Japan, onenation
- Songwriter: Soulhead

Soulhead singles chronology
| "Kimi no Kiseki/Itsumademo..." (2006) | "Dear Friends" (2007) |

"Dear Friends" is Soulhead's fifteenth single and has been the last single they have released to date. It was released on January 24, 2007 and charted at #60 on Oricon, staying on the charts for four weeks.

== Information ==
Dear Friends was released in a CD only edition. Both the title track and the B-side, "Feel Like Jumping", made it to the corresponding album, Best of Soulhead, along with their music videos. Both songs were written and arranged by Yoshika and Tsugumi. The title track was used as theme song for the film Dear Friends. The film featured Keiko Kitagawa and Yuika Motokariya.

"Dear Friends" is a smooth pop/R&B song about having struggles in life, but as long as you have a special person with you, miracles are possible. "Feel Like Jumping" (stylized as FEEL LIKE JUMPING) is a pop song about not being afraid to be yourself, no matter where you are.

Unlike their previous work, which was predominantly rap, hip hop and R&B, this single was centered more around elements of pop music.

== Track listing ==
=== CD ===
1. "Dear Friends"
2. "Feel Like Jumping"
3. "Dear Friends" (Instrumental)
4. "Feel Like Jumping" (Instrumental)
