= Kimi no Kiseki/Itsumademo... =

Single by Soulhead

from the album Best of Soulhead
- Released: December 6, 2006
- Recorded: 2006
- Genre: R&B; pop
- Label: Sony Japan
- Songwriter: Soulhead

Soulhead singles chronology
"Pray/XXX" (2006)	"Kimi no Kiseki/Itsumademo..." (2006)	"Dear Friends" (2007)

"Kimi no Kiseki/Itsumademo..." (キミノキセキ/いつまでも... / Miracle of You/forever...) is Soulhead's fourteenth single. It was released on December 6, 2006 and contained two new songs. It charted at No. 56 on Oricon.

== Information ==
"Kimi no Kiseki/Itsumademo..." was released on CD and as a 12" vinyl. Yoshika wrote the lyrics and music for "Kimi no Kiseki", while Tsugumi wrote the winter anthem "Itsumademo...". Both songs were winter love ballads with most of the lyrics in Japanese, unlike their previous songs, which were predominantly in English.

On the 12" vinyl, Soulhead covered the song "I Saw Mommy Kissing Santa Claus", originally performed in 1952 by Jimmy Boyd.

Both A-sides made it to the corresponding album, Best of Soulhead, and were given music videos on the DVD portion.

== Track listing ==
=== CD ===
1. "Kimi no Kiseki" (by Yoshika from Soulhead)
2. "Itsumademo..." (by Tsugumi from Soulhead)
3. "Kimi no Kiseki" (instrumental)
4. "Itsumademo..." (instrumental)

=== 12" Vinyl ===
Side A

1. "I Saw Mommy Kissing Santa Claus"
2. "Kimi no Kiseki" (by Yoshika from Soulhead)
3. "Kimi no Kiseki" (instrumental)
4. "Kimi no Kiseki" (a cappella)

Side B

1. "Itsumademo..." (by Tsugumi from Soulhead)
2. "Itsumademo..." (instrumental)
3. "Itsumademo..." (a cappella)
