= Ryoff Karma =

Japanese rapper, singer and songwriter (born 1983)

Ryoff Karma 呂布カルマ
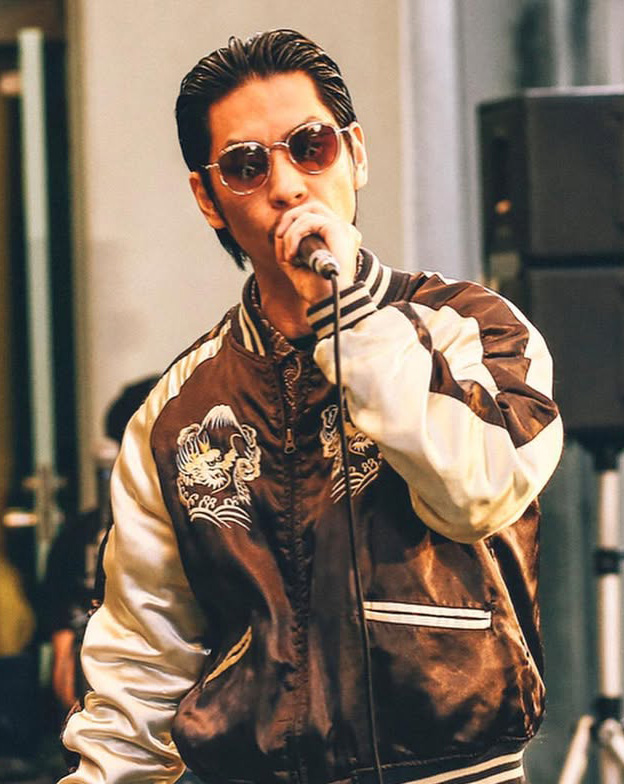
- Ryoff Karma performing at Sasa Folk Jamboree 2021

Background information
- Born: Yuya Mishima; January 7, 1983 (age 43)
- Origin: Japan
- Genres: Hip hop; J-pop
- Occupation: Rapper
- Years active: 2007–present
- Label: Jet City People

Yuya Mishima (三島 侑也, Mishima Yuya; born January 7, 1983), known professionally as Ryoff Karma (呂布カルマ), is a Japanese rapper known for performing in MC battles and televised competitions. He has also worked as a cultural critic, actor, and voice actor.

== Early life ==
Ryoff Karma was born in Nishinomiya, Hyōgo Prefecture, in 1983 and spent much of his childhood in Higashiyodogawa-ku, Osaka. His family moved to Nagoya during his junior high school years. After graduating, he worked various jobs, including positions at a karaoke chain, a pest control company, and later as a pharmaceutical delivery worker and cram school manager.

== Rap career ==
=== Rap production ===
Ryoff Karma began performing in clubs and gradually focused on live rap performances. He lamented the state of the hip-hop scene at the time, feeling that both the underground artists around him and the established artists before him had fallen out of touch. After receiving hip-hop tracks from online, Ryoff Karma was able to publish his first album 13shit in 2009 through the hip-hop group BB9's indie label Meikou Recordings. After this, Ryoff Karma and fellow college attendee Takanome (鷹の目) formed the label Jet City People to support other artists in the area.

He has composed and performed music for commercial campaigns for brands such as Yanmar and Central Japan Railway Company, as well as public campaigns by Ad Council Japan. He has also worked on projects for local governments and awareness campaigns.

He has collaborated with Japanese rappers DJ Krush, Hannya (般若), Shinpeita, Gaki Ranger (餓鬼RANGER), Kan a.k.a. GAMI, and DOTAMA.

Ryoff Karma has also collaborated with artists outside of hip-hop, including the rock band ANABANTFULLS in 2023. In 2024, he collaborated with idol group LINKL PLANET.

=== Battle rap ===
Ryoff Karma is best known in Japan for his work in battle rap, which he has won many championships in.

=== Television ===
Ryoff Karma became a television personality in 2023, appearing 156 times and ranking 8th in the "Breakout Talents of 2023" list. He has appeared in televised debates and hosted radio shows discussing cultural topics.

== Reception ==
Japanese rappers such as R-Shitei, Shinpeita, and FORK have praised Ryoff Karma's rhyming and style.

== Controversies ==
As a result of his frequent brutal honesty and his affinity for softcore pornography (referred to as "gravure" in Japanese), Ryoff Karma has become the subject of controversy many times in Japanese media.

In 2013, the unmanned Koi-Yamagata Station was painted pink in following the theme of its name. After stopping at this station in September of 2024, Ryoff Karma made a post on X (formerly Twitter) criticizing the station. This post quickly made headlines across Japan, with many criticizing his wanton judgement of a small Japanese community. Ryoff Karma's judgement was largely derived from the moe styled anime character on the station, echoing his frequent judgement of lolicon and Otaku cultures in Japan.

== Musical style ==
Ryoff Karma's early work aligned with Japanese hip-hop conventions; later, he focused on social commentary, satire, and philosophical themes.

== Personal life ==
Ryoff Karma graduated from Nagoya University of the Arts in 2005. He is married with two children.

== Discography ==
=== Albums ===
Title	Release date	Record label	Notes/Ref.
13shit	7 January 2009	Meikou Recordings (DQC-187)	Catalog number via Boundee distribution
Yojigen Hip-hop	18 August 2010	Jet City People (JCP-1001)	
Strong	17 August 2011	Jet City People (JCP-1101)	
The Cool Core	9 May 2014	Jet City People (JCP-1402)	
A New Misunderstanding	23 November 2016	Jet City People (JCP-1605)	With producer p1 a.k.a. 2g
Supersalt	9 May 2018	Jet City People (JCP-1801)	
Be kenja	23 June 2021	Jet City People (JCP-2101)	
bokeh	10 November 2021	Jet City People (JCP-2102)	As part of the group nue

== Filmography ==
=== Television ===
Year	Title	Role	Notes	Ref.
2017–2019	Freestyle Dungeon	Monster		
2021	Red Eyes: Surveillance Investigation Team	Shigeo Minatogawa	Episode 3	
2022–present	Wide Show	Himself		
2022–present	Sidewalk/Driveway Variety: Encounter with the Road	Himself	Segment: "Want to Fall for Ryoff Karma on the Night Streets of Nagoya"	
2022–present	GogoSuma – GO GO! Smile!	Himself		

=== Film ===
Year	Title	Role	Notes	Ref.
2022	The Alien Painter			
2023	Wolf of the Blood 2			

=== Radio ===
Year	Title	Station	Role	Ref.
2019–present	Flying Bed	Zip-FM	Navigator	
2021–present	Ryoff Karma's Rap Hour	FM Nagoya	Host	
2022–present	Scholar Meals	Audible Japan	Host	
