= B-girl (disambiguation) =

A b-girl is a breakdancer.

B-girl, or variants, may also refer to:

- Bargirl, a woman who is paid to entertain patrons in a bar or nightclub
- B-Girl (film), a 2009 dance film
- The 'B' Girls, a Canadian musical group
- The B-Girlz, a Canadian drag comedy trio
- "B Girls", a 1987 song by Young and Restless
