= Japan Dance Delight =

JAPAN DANCE DELIGHT is major street dance competition held annually since 1994 in Japan.

== Past Champions ==
vol.	Year	Champion
1	1994	Rimokonzu(りもこんず)
2	1995	BAO BAB
3	1996	CO-IN LOCKERS
4	1997	ELECTRIC TROUBLE
5	1998	3D CONNECTION & NEW POWER G
6	1999	DEF
7	2000	Sakkaku Musha(錯覚武者)
8	2001	Dengeki Chomoranma-tai(電撃チョモランマ隊)
9	2002	3D CREW
10	2003	ELECTRIC TROUBLE
11	2004	Hilty&Bosch
12	2005	G'old
13	2006	SYMBO-ISM+CLOCK EYED CANVAS
14	2007	MORTAL COMBAT
15	2008	GLASS HOPPER + PINOCCHIO
16	2009	Former Action(フォーマーアクション)
24	2017	Alaventa (Uno Santa, Miyu, Jumpei)
