= Naked (Soulhead album) =

Studio album by Soulhead
- Released: March 8, 2006
- Recorded: 2005–2006
- Genre: R&B, hip hop
- Label: Sony Music Entertainment Japan

Soulhead chronology
Braided (2004)	Naked (2006)	Re-Construct Album Vol.2 Crystallized (2006)

Singles from Naked
- 1. "Fiesta" Released: June 17, 2005; 2. "Sparkle☆Train" Released: December 4, 2005; 3. "Pray/XXX" Released: February 1, 2006

Naked is the third album by female duo Soulhead and was their last studio album with Sony Music Entertainment Japan, whereas they moved to Avex afterwards. Their final album under SMEJ was a compilation album, Best of Soulhead. The album reached #5 on the Oricon Weekly charts, but dropped to #19 for the monthly ranking. It was also their first album to be released in both CD and CD+DVD format.

A limited edition "analog version" was released three weeks later on March 24, 2006.

== Track listing ==
(Source)

=== CD ===
1. "Birth" (intro)
2. "Fiesta"
3. "One more time"
4. "Sparkle☆Train"
5. "Breath" (Interlude)
6. "Yume no Uchi" (夢の中 / in the dream)
7. "meaning"
8. "One Love" (skit)
9. "Anata"
10. "Touch" (interlude)
11. "Soulhead is Back"
12. "Don't U Think?"
13. "Joyful"
14. "XXX feat. Koda Kumi"
15. "Whachagonado?"
16. "Got to leave"
17. "Pray"
18. "Nature" (interlude)
19. "Furusato"

=== DVD ===
1. "Fiesta" (music video)
2. "Sparkle☆Train" (music video)
3. "Pray" (music video)
4. "XXX" feat. Koda Kumi (music video)
5. "Furusato" (music video)

== Charts and sales ==
Oricon Ranking (Weekly)	Sales
5	41,601
