= Nobodyknows =

Japanese hip-hop band

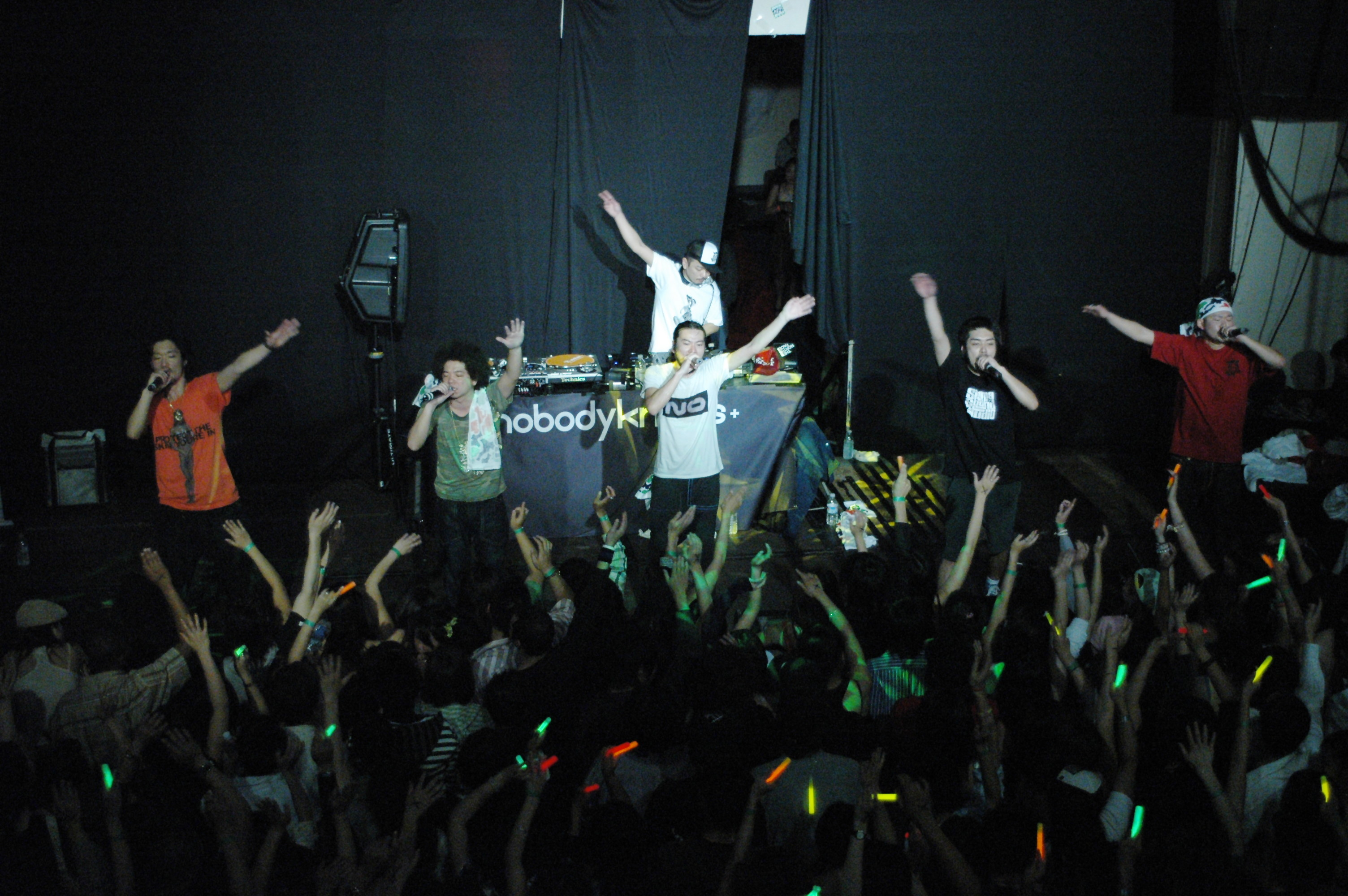
- Nobodyknows performing live in 2007

Background information
- Origin: Nagoya, Aichi Prefecture, Japan
- Genres: Hip-hop; pop rap
- Years active: 1999–present
- Labels: $Tax (2000–2001, 2010–); Onenation (2002–2009)
- Members: DJ Mitsu; Crystal Boy; Yasu Ichiban; MC Nashi; Nori da Funky Shibiresath
- Past members: G-ton
- Website: nobodyknows-fc.com

Nobodyknows (stylized as nobodyknows+) is a Japanese hip-hop band founded in 1999.

== History ==
Nobodyknows debuted in 2003 on the Sony Music Associated Records label with the mini-album Nobody knows 3. They quickly came to fame with their single CD "Kokoro Odoru", a song that was used as the second ending theme for the anime television series SD Gundam Force and included in the Nintendo DS game Osu! Tatakae! Ouendan. They released their first album, Do You Know?, in June 2004 and debuted at number one on the Japanese Oricon charts. In 2005, the group organized the Nagoya Music Expo in order to help aspiring artists, which ended up drawing in around 10,000 attendees.

Later that same year, Nobodyknows released their second album, titled 5MC&1DJ. The album featured the song "Shiawase Nara Te o Tatakō" which was used as the theme song for the Japanese release of Kung Fu Hustle. The group remained in the public eye in 2006 with a national tour in February as they performed in every prefecture in Japan, which had not been previously done before by a hip-hop group. The tour was filmed and released in November as a DVD and Blu-ray release titled Nobodyknows+ Tour 2006 "5MC&1DJ" - Kuribou no Menkui Dochu Hizakurige. The group performed their first overseas concert at Tokyo Night 2007 on 24 March in Long Beach, California.

Their single "Hero’s Come Back!!" was chosen as the first opening theme for the anime television series Naruto: Shippūden. On 10 February 2009, they released a new single called "Fallin'" which featured the original singer Shigeru Matsuzaki. In 2009, they left major label Onenation and returned to their original indie label $Tax (pronounced "Dollar Tax") Records.

In 2011, member Nori da Funky Shibiresath started balancing his work at Nobodyknows with a career in professional wrestling. He wrestled occasionally and as a freelancer, mainly competing in Dramatic Dream Team and Ice Ribbon, though he became a usual member of Pro Wrestling Heat Up in 2017. His tenure there would be successful, winning the Shakunetsuo Battle League 2017 and taking the Heat Up Universal Championship from founder Kazuhiro Tamura. However, after losing the title to Daisuke Kanehira, he retired from professional wrestling in October 2018.

== Members ==
- MC Nashi - Born 21 July 1979
- Crystal Boy - Born 4 July 1977
- Yasu Ichiban? (ヤス一番？) - Born 29 November 1978
- Nori da Funky Shibiresath (ノリ・ダ・ファンキーシビレサス) - Born 20 August 1980
- DJ Mitsu - Born 12 March 1972

=== Former members ===
- G-ton - Born 22 January 1975

== Notable dates ==
- 1996: DJ Mitsu forms the independent record label $Tax Records and the recording studio Sigma Sounds Studio, the latter of which was housed in the same building as Lush The Underground, a nightclub for which he served as a manager.
- 1996: Shortly after their first release, G-Ton leaves his former band Cipher Maze. Lush's managers DJ Mitsu and DJ Murakamigo subsequently offered him a spot at Lush as a resident MC.
- 1998: DJ Mitsu and G-Ton begin collaborating on music production.
- 1999: G-Ton and DJ Mitsu form the unit Nobody Knows together. Crystal Boy begins featuring on the duo's live performances before joining Nobody knows.
- October 1999: G-Ton and DJ Mitsu produce their first song "understan'?". The song was subsequently featured on the TV program "Future Tracks", much to the dismay of the otherwise empty-handed duo.
- 29 August 2000: The EP nobody knows is released.
- 28 April 2001: The EP nobody knows 2 is released, ranking 19th on Oricon Indies Chart.
- 2002: DJ Mitsu forms the hip-hop unit Wakaba-Juku with Yasu Ichiban, Hidden Fish, and Nori Da Funky Shibiresath.
- 1 February 2002: Nobody knows signs a contract with record label Onenation.
- 19 February 2003: Nobody knows' major debut, nobody knows 3, is released.
- 1 June 2003: Finding it difficult to balance DJing for nobody knows and Wakaba Juku, DJ Mitsu consolidates Wakaba-Juku into nobody knows and rebrands the band as nobodyknows+.
- 27 Aug 2003: Nobodyknows' first published release, Irai Zecchō, is released.
- 30 June 2004: Nobodyknows' first album, Do you know?, is released. The album stands in 1st place on the Oricon Weekly Chart for two weeks, and sells 800,000 copies.
- 31 Dec 2004: Nobodyknows is invited to perform at the 55th annual Kōhaku Uta Gassen.
- February 2006: Nobodyknows starts its tour "nobodyknows+ tour 2006 "5MC & 1DJ" ~Kuribō no Menkui Dōchū Hizakurige~", which would go on to end in July 2006 in Nagoya. The tour would go on to occur in all 47 Japanese prefectures, closing out as the most expansive J-hip-hop tour at the time.
- 6 February 2006: The music video for the song Mebae wins the award of "Story Video Winner" at the Space Shower Music Video Awards 06.
- 1 April 2007: Nobodyknows member G-ton leaves the band, citing artistic differences.
- May 2009: Nobodyknows finalizes their departure from Onenation and returns to independent music production.
- 10 June 2022: Nobodyknows appears on The First Take, performing Kokoro Odoru. The video has since come to amass over 50 million views.

== Discography ==
=== EP ===
- Nobody knows (19 August 2000)
- Nobody knows 2 (28 April 2001)
- Omae wa Hirata Daro? (お前は平田だろ?) (10 August 2002)
- Nobody knows 3 (19 February 2003)
- Irai Zecchō (以来絶頂) (27 August 2003)
- Susumidasu→ (ススミダス→) (19 November 2003)
- Platinum 4 (16 September 2015)

=== Singles ===
- "Poron^{2}" (ポロン^{2}) (25 February 2004)
- "Kokoro Odoru" (ココロオドル) (26 May 2004)
- "Shiawase Nara Te wo Tatakō / T.R.U.E." (シアワセナラテヲタタコウ／T.R.U.E.) (13 January 2005)
- "Mebae" (メバエ) (27 April 2005)
- "El Mirador ~Tenbōdai no Uta~" (エル・ミラドール ～展望台の唄～) (6 July 2005)
- "Dō yo?" (どうよ？) (19 October 2005)
- "Hero's Come Back!!" (25 April 2007)
- "Under Rain feat. Primera" (9 April 2008)
- "Villain's Pain (Hero's Come Back!!～Other Side～) / Imaike Samba" (30 July 2008)
- "Fallin' feat. Shigeru Brown" (11 February 2009)
- "Winds of Wins" (24 June 2010)
- "Fly High" (12 April 2011)
- "Join Us" (8 June 2012)
- "Let's Dance" (29 March 2013)
- "Kokoro Odoru (Remix)" (ココロオドル (Remix)) (24 December 2019)

=== Albums ===
- Do You Know? (30 June 2004)
- 5MC & 1DJ (2 November 2005)
- Vulgarhythm (22 August 2007)
- Best of nobodyknows+ (compilation album) (11 March 2009)
- nobodyknows+ is dead? (25 September 2013)
- The Five Ways (6 December 2017)
- All Time Best (compilation album) (30 November 2022)
