= Pray/XXX =

Single by Soulhead

from the album Naked
- Released: 27 January 2006 (JP)
- Recorded: 2006
- Genre: J-pop, J hip hop, dance-pop
- Label: Rhythm Zone; RZCD-45303 (Japan, CD); SM Entertainment; SMJTCD-091 (Korea, CD)
- Songwriter: Soulhead

Soulhead singles chronology
"Sparkle☆Train" (2005)	"Pray/XXX" (2006)	"Kimi no Kiseki/Itsumademo..." (2006)

Koda Kumi singles chronology
"No Regret" (2006)	"Pray/XXX" (2006)	"Ima Sugu Hoshii" (2006)

Pray/XXX is the thirteenth single by the female duo Soulhead from their third studio album Naked. The main track, "Pray," was an R&B mix, while "XXX" was an upbeat pop/hip-hop mix featuring artist Koda Kumi. The single charted at No. 22 on Oricon Weekly.

Koda Kumi had her own version of the song "XXX" called "D.D.D." on her Best ~second session~ album. Her version had Soulhead as the featured artist and was also produced by Octopussy.

== Background information ==
Pray/XXX is the thirteenth single by Japanese R&B duo Soulhead. The single was their fourth and final single before the release of their third studio album Naked. It charted at No. 22 on the Oricon Singles Charts, becoming their highest charting single. The single was a double a-side, with both "Pray" and "XXX" containing music videos.

"Pray" was written by the members and sisters of Soulhead, Yoshika and Tsugumi, with production being done by Octopussy. The song contained many R&B elements, mixing in elements of pop and rap. Being the main focus of the single, the outfits they wore in the music video were the same outfits they donned on the single's cover.

"XXX" was also written by Yoshika and Tsugumi, with Octopussy producing the song. The track featured singer-songwriter Kumi Koda, who was in the process of releasing her 12 Singles Collection at the time. Musically, "XXX" is a dance song that borrows numerous musical elements such as R&B. The song borrows a 4-bar melody from the Missy Elliott and Rockwilder's remake of "Lady Marmalade," which featured singers Missy Elliott, Mya, Pink, Lil' Kim and Christina Aguilera. The song is sung in half Japanese and English.

"XXX" was the variation of the single "D.D.D," which was released by R&B-turned-pop artist, Koda Kumi, in December 2005. "D.D.D." credits Soulhead as the featured artist and was inspired by groove music.

Much like their other singles, Pray/XXX was also released as a vinyl.

== Music video ==
"Pray" featured many elements in the video which were most popular during the 1990s music scenes – with fast-forwarding and slowing down for many segments – and mixed those with modern-styled shoots. The outfits featured in the music video's church scenes were those Soulhead wore on the cover of the single.

"XXX" was the alternate version to "D.D.D.," which had Kumi as the main focus. "XXX" did not contain as much sexual imagery during the rapping, instead featuring the imagery with Yoshika and Tsugumi throughout the song and removing Kumi's solo dance segment.

== Track listing ==
(Source: All Music)

CD
No.	Title	Lyrics	Music	Arrangers	Length
1.	"Pray"	Soulhead	Octopussy	Octopussy • Mitsuki Shiokawa • Masanobu Fukuhara • Tomoyuki Tachihara	4:34
2.	"XXX feat. Koda Kumi"	Soulhead	Octopussy • Chris Gehringer	Octopussy	4:13
3.	"Pray" (Instrumental)		Octopussy	Octopussy • Mitsuki Shiokawa • Masanobu Fukuhara • Tomoyuki Tachihara	4:32
4.	"XXX feat. Koda Kumi" (Instrumental)		Octopussy • Chris Gehringer	Octopussy	4:09

DVD: Music Video
No.	Title	Length
1.	"Pray" (Music Video)	4:32
2.	"XXX feat. Koda Kumi" (Music Video)	4:12

=== 12" Vinyl ===
Side A
No.	Title	Lyrics	Music	Arrangers	Length
1.	"Pray"	SOULHEAD	OCTOPUSSY	OCTOPUSSY • Mitsuki Shiokawa • Masanobu Fukuhara • Tomoyuki Tachihara	4:34
2.	"XXX feat. Koda Kumi"	SOULHEAD	OCTOPUSSY • Chris Gehringer	OCTOPUSSY	4:13

Side B
No.	Title	Music	Arrangers	Length
1.	"Pray" (Instrumental)	OCTOPUSSY	OCTOPUSSY • Mitsuki Shiokawa • Masanobu Fukuhara • Tomoyuki Tachihara	4:32
2.	"XXX feat. Koda Kumi" (Instrumental)	OCTOPUSSY • Chris Gehringer	OCTOPUSSY	4:09

== Charts (Japan) ==
Oricon Sales Chart (Japan)

Release	Chart	Peak position
27 January 2006	Oricon Weekly Charts	4

== Alternate versions ==
Pray

1. "Pray": Found on the single and corresponding album Naked (2006)
2. "Pray [Instrumental]": Found on the single (2006)
3. "Pray ~worked by Kenny Dope": Found on Re-Construct Album Vol.2 Crystallized (2006)

XXX feat. Koda Kumi

1. "XXX feat. Koda Kumi": Found on the single and corresponding album Naked (2006)
2. "XXX feat. Koda Kumi [Instrumental]": Found on the single (2006)
3. "XXX feat. Koda Kumi ~worked by Sa-Ra": Found on Re-Construct Album Vol.2 Crystallized (2006)
