= Oh My Sister =

Studio album by Soulhead
- Released: March 5, 2003
- Recorded: 2002–2003
- Genre: R&B, hip hop, rap
- Length: 54:02
- Label: Sony Music Entertainment Japan

Soulhead chronology
Oh My Sister (2003)	Re-Construct Album Vol.1 Reflection (2003)

Singles from Oh My Sister
- 1. "STEP TO THE NEW WORLD" Released: June 24, 2002; 2. "LOVER, KNIGHT, MAN" Released: November 20, 2002; 3. "Sora" Released: February 5, 2003; 4. "Oh My Sister (Remix)/I'm just going down" Released: May 2, 2003

Oh My Sister is the debut studio album by female duo Soulhead and is their first album with Sony Music Entertainment Japan. The album reached #3 on the Oricon Weekly charts.

== Information ==
The album was predominantly rap, R&B and hip-hop. It was released on CD and vinyl; the a-side's music videos for the album were later put on their DVD Oh My Sister Live & Clips, which was released in October 2003. The album was their highest-charting album (coming in at #3).

== Track listing ==
=== CD ===
(Track List)

1. "Theme of Soulhead"
2. "Step to the New World"
3. "Break Up"
4. "To Da Fake MCs"
5. "The Air Force" (Interlude)
6. Lover, Knight, Man
7. "Playboy"
8. Secret Love
9. destiny ~born to be sister~ (Interlude)
10. Woo!
11. Too Late
12. Moon Shine
13. Sora
14. sincerely (Interlude)
15. Oh My Sister
16. Song for You

=== 12" ===
(Track List)

Side A

1. "Theme of Soulhead"
2. "Step to the New World"
3. "Break Up"
4. "To Da Fakes MCs"
5. "the air force" (Interlude)
6. "Lover, Knight, Man"
7. "Playboy"
8. "Secret Love"

Side B

1. "destiny ~born to be sister~" (Interlude)
2. "Woo!"
3. "Too Late"
4. "Moon Shine"
5. "Sora"
6. "sincerely" (Interlude)
7. "Oh My Sister"
8. "Song For You"
