= Lovin' You (Soulhead song) =

Single by Batti Baas
- Released: 7 January 2001 (JP)
- Recorded: 2001
- Genre: R&B, hip hop
- Label: Handcuts Records
- Songwriter(s): Batti Baas, Aaron Blackmon

Batti Baas singles chronology
"Lovin' You" (2001)	"Inside Out" (2002)

"Lovin' You" (stylized as LOVIN' YOU) is Batti Baas' debut single. The song featured rapper Aaron Blackmon.

== Information ==
Lovin' You was released as 12" vinyl and contained different versions of the song on each side. The single was produced by Aki Hisakawa, with the lyrics written by both Yoshika and Tsugumi of Batti Baas and Aaron Blackmon.

Batti Baas would later become known as Soulhead, whereas Yoshika and Tsugumi were picked up by Sony Music Entertainment Japan in 2002.

== Track listing ==
(Track List)

=== Side A ===
1. "Lovin' You" [Breezy Mix]
2. "Lovin' You" [Breezy Mix Inst.]

=== Side B ===
1. "Lovin' You" [Baas Mix]
2. "Lovin' You" [Baas Mix Inst.]
