= King Giddra =

Japanese hip hop group

- Origin: Tokyo, Japan
- Genres: Japanese hip hop J-pop
- Years active: 1993–1996; 2001–2003
- Labels: P-Vine Records; DefStar Records
- Past members: K Dub Shine; Zeebra; DJ Oasis

King Giddra was a Japanese hip hop group that started in 1993. They were signed to the indie label P-Vine Records. After a six-year hiatus, they would go on to sign with DefStar Records, a sublabel under Sony Music Entertainment Japan (SMEJ) for their second album release.

== Members ==
The group is made of up three members: K Dub Shine (MC/concept leader of the group), Zeebra (MC), and DJ Oasis (DJ). The group is named after the 3-headed monster from the Godzilla movies, King Ghidorah. Zeebra has said that they chose the name after realizing that Godzilla is a character that represents international Japan. In the film, "King Giddra is the bad guy, but as a public enemy, he is doing an extremely positive thing." They say that as an enemy of the public, they are an enemy of the system that oppresses them, like how Godzilla was the oppressive system and King Ghidorah was the enemy.

Although all three members were born in Tokyo, each member spent some time living and growing up in the United States. K Dub Shine, did a homestay in Florida before moving to Oakland, California, where he would meet future members of the group, Zeebra and DJ Oasis. According to the group's appearance on the Japanese music variety show, Hey!Hey!Hey! Music Champ, DJ Oasis and Zeebra have known each other since grade school.

== Style of music ==
Their style is influenced by the American rap group Public Enemy, which is evidenced by their political views on the state of Japanese society in the lyrics of their songs, such as "Bullet of Truth." The song's opening lyrics are "Facing us is an illusion... the noise of a completely corrupt society/ Giddra lights a fire in the war of ideas in a 20-faced disguise forcing a new association of thoughts." The lyrics are indicative of a broader theme in hip hop of being critical of the greater majority in one's society. The line referencing a "new association of thoughts" promotes the efficacy of hip hop to go beyond complaining about problems and actually change the way people think. "This song is a throwback to the socially conscious lyrics of Hip Hop's beginning in the inner-cities of America." In this song, King Giddra questions the education system that "crushes the dreams of children" as well as the media overload, especially in terms of advertising, sex and violence, which becomes a kind of mind control. Their debut album (The Power from the Sky) is also inspired by Public Enemy, from their song "Black Steel In The Hour Of Chaos". The title song, uses a sample from that PE song. By using American samples and rapping about Japanese issues, King Giddra mixes local and global perspectives of the world into their hip hop.

As the popularity of hip hop in Japan increased in the 1990s, mainstream J-Pop began to produce J-Rap, which was just party rap with no real political message. Those in the hip hop culture of Japan noticed the success of J-Rap and wondered if rap in Japan should discuss socio-political issues or if it should remain mainstream with lighter lyrics. King Giddra chose to make Japanese hip hop more political and about social issues that those in Japan faced. This also helped to create a Japanese style of rap that was not just an imitation of American rap because King Giddra discussed issues specific to Japan. For example, in their 1995 song, "Bullet of Truth", the group discusses how the education system "crushes the dreams of children" by making them think they will have a successful job after graduation, when in reality, unemployment is very common among young Japanese adults. They also criticize the media by saying that its advertising is overpowering and becomes a sort of mind control. Japanese society is condemned for its "heartless commercialism" and "despoiled environment".

By the early 2000s, different aspects of King Giddra's political perspective began to emerge. Though still claiming inspiration from African American groups such as Public Enemy, projects such as The Ultimate Weapon (Saishuu Heiki) contained more overtly nationalistic statements. In 2002, K Dub Shine produced the soundtrack for "The Sakura of Madness," a film chronicling three nationalistic youths in Shibuya who attack those they view as “ruining the sanctity of the streets” and become sucked into a yakuza war" In an interview with Remix magazine in 2009, K Dub Shine openly expressed his right-wing views, including his belief that Japanese soldiers who died in World War II should be honored as fighting for the betterment of Japan. He compared the Occupation of Japan after World War II to the enslavement of black people in America, calling the two a "shared experience" of oppression, and described the Black Panthers as a right-wing organization.

== Group career ==
The group's debut album would help them launch solo careers with major labels. K Dub signed with Japanese music label juggernaut, avex, under their "cutting edge" imprint, releasing his solo album (Present Time) in 1997. Zeebra signed with Pony Canyon and released his debut album The Rhyme Animal, a moniker inspired by Chuck D of Public Enemy, the following year in 1998. Both artists would go on to sign their own artists under their group. K Dub Shine already had his Atomic Bomb Crew (which was responsible for developing King Giddra), and Zeevra with UBG (Urbarian Gym) a wordplay in Japanese of (Tokai no Yabanjin/Barbarians of the city). Urbarian plays off the word "urban" and "barbarian". Gym plays off the Japanese pronunciation of (jin) from which means "people".

With the success of their respective solo ventures, the group would go on a long hiatus until the eventual release of their second, and possibly last album, The Ultimate Weapon (Saishuu Heiki). It was released in 2002. Unlike the debut album which saw beatmaking duties split largely between Zeebra and DJ Oasis, "Saishuu Heiki" was mostly produced by DJ Oasis.

The simultaneous release of two of their singles "F.F.B." and "Unstoppable" saw commercial success with them reaching the 5th and 6th spot on the Oricon charts. They made their first and only appearance as a group to perform in the Japanese music shows, Hey!Hey!Hey! Music Champ and Musicstation. However both singles dealt with controversy. "F.F.B." contained a line that offended people with HIV, while the song (Driveby) offended the gay community accusing it of discrimination. The original "Unstoppable" single [blue cover] was discontinued and re-released without the song "Driveby" [yellowed cover]. The track was replaced with their song, (Heisei Ishin/Heisei Restoration; a concept borrowed from the "Meiji Restoration". Heisei being the present-day Japanese era). On September 11, 2002, they released their last single for the album "911", exactly one year after the incident. King Giddra's song "911" addressed America's misguided "war on terror," and the complicity of the Japanese media and the national government. The song reflects on ground zero and its aftermath in two eras: August 1945 and September 11, 2001. Their music video opens with an image of ground zero Hiroshima. The group song video uses images of Hiroshima's ground zero after the bombing as a way of rethinking ground zero New York. According to Ian Condry the image, "at the center of the picture, the government building now known as the Peace Dome figures prominently." The group lyricist raps about America's hypocrisy in always telling Japan "to follow the path of peace" but then starts bombing Baghdad. On the other hand, they see the Japanese government as equally at fault because of their complicity. Also the first and third verses of the song appear on their 2002 video Saishuu Heiki, or the Ultimate Weapon (Defstar Records). The song is inspiring because it great to see that some rappers from Japanese tackling issues of social opposition and bringing more voices to the call for peace.

The album was released in October and featured "F.F.B." with edited lyrics, and the song (Koukai Shokei/Public Execution) which was a diss track. Zeebra airs out KJ from the group Dragon Ash, while K Dub Shine's verse aims at "sell-out rappers" and calls out Kick The Can Crew, and Rip Slyme through word play of their names, while allowing his point to flow through his verse:
(kiku to kan kuruu, RIRIKU tsurai, herikutsu RAIMU/ listening to it makes me mad as hell, annoying lyrics, pointless rhymes).

The song (Generation Next) is the album version of a song they contributed to the movie (Kyouki no Sakura/The Sakura of Madness), directed by Sonoda Kenji, who is the longtime music video director of King Giddra, as well as some of their solo work's videos.

== Solo career of the members ==
Upon the conclusion of the album's tour, the group went their separate ways again, resuming their solo careers. While K Dub's content remained consistent, Zeebra's popularity and charisma saw him become more active in the entertainment industry, starring in a short series drama, developing his UBG label, producing for and featuring on high-profile jpop artists such as BoA, Namie Amuro, and EXILE, etc. Currently K DUB has released three studio albums (Genzai Jikoku, Ikiru/Live, and Riyuu/Reason). Zeebra has released five studio albums (The Rhyme Animal, Based on a True Story, Tokyo's Finest, The New Beginning, and the recently released World of Music). DJ Oasis has released two studio albums ((Toukyou Sabaku/Tokyo Desert), and Waterworld). He has also formed a DJ group called The Axis with longtime King Giddra collaborator, UBG's Inovader to release mixtapes that combine American rap artists, old school and new school, and blending them with their own beats. K Dub Shine and DJ Oasis also formed a group called Radio Aktive Project (wordplay associated with "Rap" and their label "Atomic Bomb Records") designed to be similar to that of King Giddra, albeit without Zeebra.
