= Lover, Knight, Man =

Single by Soulhead

from the album Oh My Sister
- Released: November 20, 2002 (JP)
- Recorded: 2002
- Genre: J-pop, R&B
- Label: Sony Music Entertainment; AICL-1387 (Japan, CD); 03296 (Japan, 12")

Soulhead singles chronology
"Step to the New World" (2002)	"Lover, Knight, Man" (2002)	"Sora" (2003)

"Lover, Knight, Man" (stylized as LOVER, KNIGHT, MAN), is female duo Soulhead's second single under Sony Music Entertainment Japan. It managed to reach #36 on the Oricon charts and charted for eight weeks.

== Information ==
While a music video for Lover, Knight, Man was released, it was not released on the single or its corresponding album, Oh My Sister, but was placed on the DVD Oh My Sister Live & Clips. Like their debut single, Step to the New World, Lover, Knight, Man was also released on CD and vinyl.

The album was titled after the b-side from this single, Oh My Sister.

== Track listing ==
=== CD ===
(Source)

1. "Lover, Knight, Man"
2. "Oh My Sister"
3. "Lover, Knight, Man" (Instrumental)
4. "Oh My Sister" (Instrumental)

=== 12" Vinyl ===
Side A

1. "Lover, Knight, Man"
2. "Lover, Knight, Man" (Instrumental)
3. "Lover, Knight, Man" (A Capella)

Side B

1. "Oh My Sister"
2. "Oh My Sister" (Instrumental)
3. "Oh My Sister" (A Capella)

== Charts and sales ==
Oricon Ranking (Weekly)	Sales
36	
