= Get Up! (Soulhead EP) =

"GET UP! ep"

Single by Soulhead

from the album Braided
- Released: 30 July 2003 (JP)
- Recorded: 2003
- Genre: R&B, Hip hop
- Label: Sony Japan
- Songwriter: Soulhead

Soulhead singles chronology
| "Oh My Sister (Remix)/I'm just going down" (2003) | "GET UP! ep" (2003) | "You can do that" (2004) |

Get Up! (stylized as GET UP! ep) is female duo Soulhead's first extended play. It was released on July 30, 2003, and contained four new songs. It also received a limited edition "analog version," which had been released two weeks prior on July 16, 2003. The single charted on Oricon at #28 for the daily ranking.

Only the title track made it to the corresponding album Braided.

== Information ==
All of the songs on the EP were written by Soulhead and arranged by both Soulhead and Octopussy. The song is a dance track about being with family, even when times get tough. Shining Forever (stylized as SHINING FOREVER) is an R&B track about not forgetting someone even when they're gone and how the memories "shine forever."

Dance With Me (stylized as DANCE WITH ME) is a dance/R&B track while Tonight the Night (stylized as TONIGHT THE NIGHT) is a hip hop song about dressing how you want when you go out clubbing and not allowing anyone to sway your interests.

== Track listing ==
=== CD: Regular Edition ===
1. Get Up!
2. Shining Forever
3. Dance With Me
4. Tonight the Night

=== 12" Analog ===
Side A

1. Get Up!
2. Get Up! (Instrumental)
3. Get Up! (A Capella)

Side B

1. Shining Forever
2. Shining Forever (Instrumental)
3. Shining Forever (A Capella)

Side C

1. Dance With Me
2. Dance With Me (Instrumental)
3. Dance With Me (A Capella)

Side D

1. Tonight the Night
2. Tonight the Night (Instrumental)
3. Tonight the Night (A Capella)

== Charts and sales ==
| Oricon Ranking (Daily) | Sales |
|---|---|
| 28 | |
