= Fiesta (Soulhead song) =

Single by Soulhead

from the album Naked
- Released: June 15, 2005
- Recorded: 2005
- Genre: Dance, R&B
- Label: SMEJ
- Songwriter(s): Soulhead

Soulhead singles chronology
"At the Party" (2004)	"Fiesta" (2005)	"Sparkle Train" (2005)

"Fiesta" is a single by Japanese R&B female duo Soulhead from the album Naked. The title track is a dance track. The single included two B-sides, "Meaning" and "Soulhead Is Back".

The single charted at No. 35 on the Oricon weekly singles chart.

== Information ==
"Fiesta" is a song about staying out all night to have fun and dance.

"Meaning" sings about how money is not everything and that living life in the moment is what life is about.

"Soulhead Is Back" is the theme for the duo with most of the lyrics in English. Only the final rap verse is in Japanese.

The music video for the title track was later put on the CD+DVD version of their Naked album.

== Track listing ==
CD

1. "Fiesta"
2. "Meaning"
3. "Soulhead Is Back"
