= Sparkle Train =

"Sparkle☆Train/Got To Leave"

Single by SOULHEAD

from the album Naked
- Released: 14 December 2005 (JP)
- Recorded: 2005
- Genre: J hip hop, R&B
- Label: Sony Japan
- Songwriter: Soulhead

SOULHEAD singles chronology
"Fiesta" (2005)	"Sparkle☆Train/Got To Leave" (2005)	"Pray/XXX" (2005)

Sparkle☆Train/Got To Leave (stylized as SPARKLE☆TRAIN/Got To Leave) is a single by female duo SOULHEAD from the album Naked. The main track, Sparkle☆Train, was an R&B/rap mix, while the b-side, Got To Leave, is smooth R&B. The single charted at #30 on Oricon Weekly, staying on the charts for eight weeks.

The music video for the title track was later put on the CD+DVD version of their Naked album.

== Track listing ==
CD

1. SPARKLE☆TRAIN
2. Got To Leave
3. SPARKLE☆TRAIN (Instrumental)
4. Got To Leave (Instrumental)
