= No Way (Soulhead song) =

Single by Soulhead

from the album Braided
- Released: March 24, 2004
- Recorded: 2004
- Genre: R&B, Hip hop
- Label: Sony Japan
- Songwriter: Soulhead

Soulhead singles chronology
"You Can Do That" (2004)	"No Way" (2004)	"At the Party" (2004)

"No Way" is the ninth single by Japanese female duo Soulhead, released on March 24, 2004. The single charted low on Oricon at number 50 for the daily ranking, before falling off the charts.

== Information ==
Keeping up with their signature, "No Way" was also released on both CD and vinyl. No Way was a smooth R&B track, while the b-side, D.O.G, was hip-hop-inspired.

The title track's lyrics were written by Soulhead and arranged by both the female duo and Octopussy. The lyrics to "No Way" are about not wanting to fight with a boyfriend and regretting the argument, which ultimately had the boyfriend leave.

An album version of "D.O.G" was later released on their corresponding album, Braided in place of the version placed on the single.

== Track listing ==
=== CD ===
1. "No Way"
2. "D.O.G"
3. "No Way" (instrumental)
4. "D.O.G" (instrumental)

=== 12" vinyl ===
Side A

1. "No Way"
2. "No Way" (instrumental)
3. "No Way" (a cappella)

Side B

1. "D.O.G"
2. "D.O.G" (instrumental)
3. "D.O.G" (a cappella)
