= Zeebra =

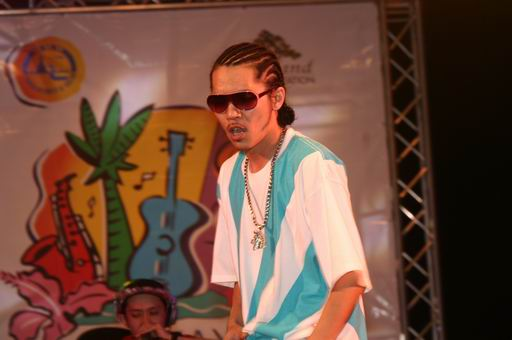
- Zeebra at Pattaya Music Festival 2006, Thailand

Background information
- Also known as: Zeebra
- Born: Hideyuki Yokoi; April 2, 1971 (age 55); Tokyo, Japan
- Genre: Hip hop
- Occupations: Rapper; songwriter; DJ
- Years active: 1995–present
- Labels: Polystar (1995–2003); UBG Records/Pony Canyon (2003–2010); Ariola Japan (2010–present)
- Formerly of: King Giddra

Hideyuki Yokoi (横井英之, born April 2, 1971), known professionally as Zeebra (ジブラ, Jibura), is a Japanese hip hop rapper and DJ who made his first appearance in 1995. Zeebra is a former member of the hip-hop group King Giddra, which also included DJ Oasis and K Dub Shine. He went on to pursue a solo career shortly after in 1997, and signed with the Future Shock record label.

Zeebra is one of the most popular rappers in Japan, and his popularity is not specific to either gender. He appears not only in hip-hop magazines, but also in fashion and street culture magazines. He often features in and produces other rappers' songs, and appears in their videos. He has also performed live with various rappers from America.

In 1998 Zeebra undertook his first solo tour. He became recognized as an individual rapper for the first time, making hip-hop more familiar to Japanese listeners. In the same year he started the radio program in Japan, titled Beats to the Rhyme. One of Zeebra's songs was used in a Nike promotion video for NBA Japan games. The following year Zeebra released the single "Mr. Dynamite", the first hip-hop single to break into the top 50 on the Japanese pop charts. In June 2000, he released his new album Based on a True Story, which sold 250,000 copies. At the end of that year Zeebra started his first Japan tour, the first hip-hop event to sell out. In 2001 Zeebra released the single "Never Enuff", the theme song for a Japanese movie called Brother, directed by Takeshi Kitano and starring Claude Maki and Omar Epps. In 2002 he temporarily rejoined King Giddra, but has been doing solo work since 2003 and has released many songs. At present, he is producing songs not only for rap artists, but also for pop stars like Namie Amuro.

== Early life ==
Zeebra was born and raised in Tokyo. During his childhood, he lived in the United States for a brief time while trying to become a professional tennis player.

He is the grandson of businessman Hideki Yokoi, former president of the Hotel New Japan. The hotel's flagship property in central Tokyo caught fire in 1982, disgracing Hideki Yokoi and causing Zeebra to be bullied by his classmates. Zeebra eventually dropped out of high school during his first year.

He married around the age of 20 and fathered two sons, Kento and Ren Yokoi, before divorcing his first wife. Ren is a DJ who plays a mixture of House and Techno, where he is also a main MC for Tokyo Scene; Tokyo’s radio show by Inter FM 89.7. He kept custody of both sons, and later remarried to Miwa Nakabayashi, to whom he fathered two daughters, Kanon and Rima Nakabayashi of NiziU. In November 2020, Zeebra and Nakabayashi announced their divorce.

== Pioneer of Japanese Hip Hop ==
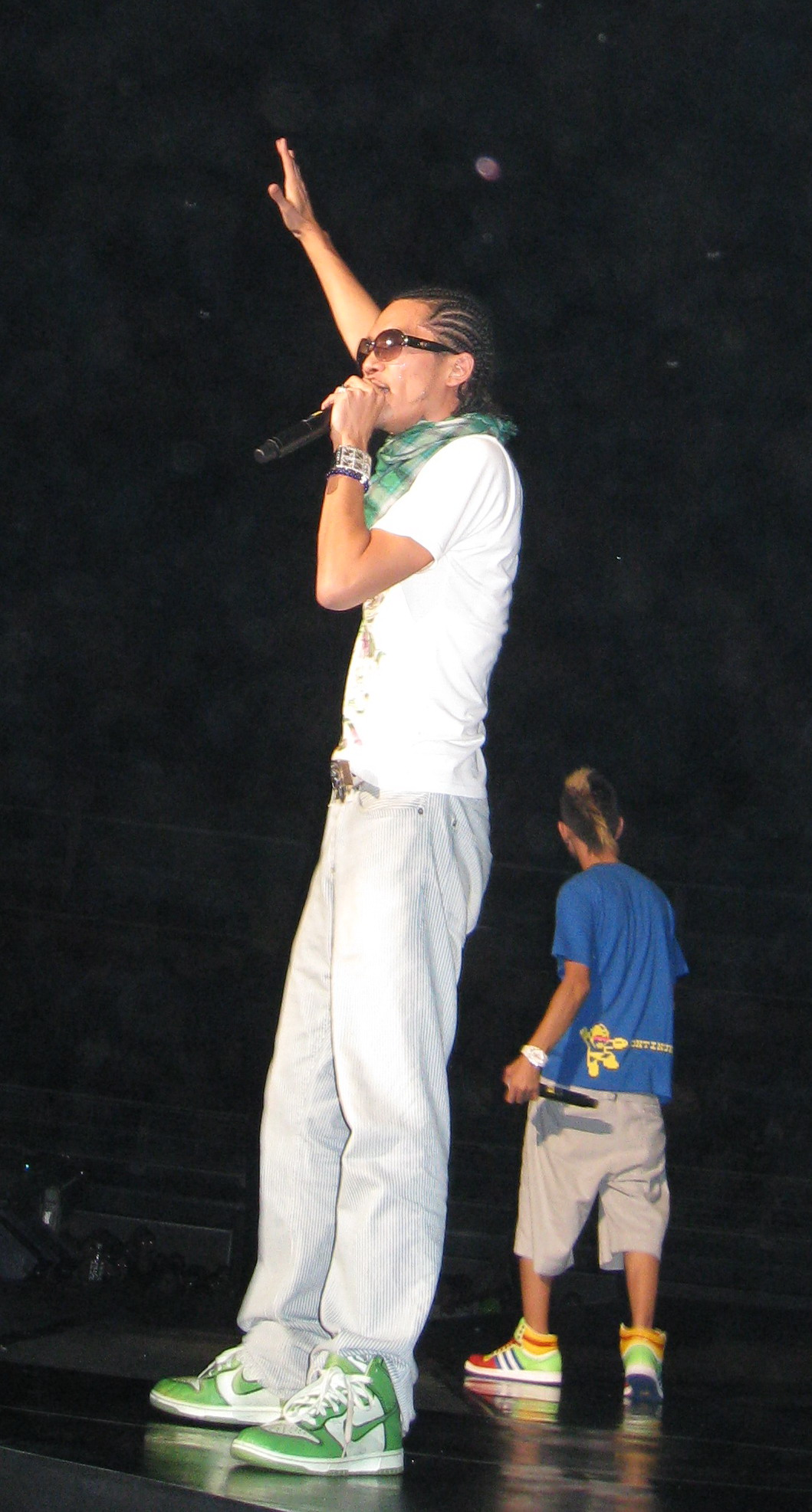
Zeebra at Asian Hip Hop Festival, Thailand.

Zeebra began his hip hop career in 1993, joining the rap group King Giddra. Zeebra, along with his group King Giddra, played an important role in the development of the Japanese hip hop scene. In the mid 1990s, King Giddra, then an underground rap group, began addressing social issues of the time. King Giddra's 1995 album "The Power from the Sky" discussed contemporary issues, particularly the economic recession and the inability of many Japanese college graduates to find employment. Zeebra addressed this issue of working towards a good education and being unable to find employment in his song "Bullet of Truth". Through their music, Zeebra and King Giddra "challenged youth not only to recognize the difficulties faced by Japanese society but also to speak up about them."

King Giddra's popularity grew in Japan. In 1996, he recorded his first solo track "Untouchable" produced by Gang Starr producer DJ Premier. By 1997 Zeebra left King Giddra to start a solo career, appearing frequently in trendy hip hop and street culture magazines and TV shows about hip hop. In 1999 he released the single "Mr. Dynamite", which became the first hip-hop single to make it into the top 50 on the Japanese Oricon pop charts. Through his early and newer work, Zeebra became one of the most popular and influential, yet controversial, Japanese hip hop artists.

In 2008, after the MTV Video Music Awards Japan Ceremony, an unhappy Zeebra went onto YouTube and published a video criticizing the MTV Japan for not appreciating musicians.

== Discography ==
=== Albums ===
- [1998.06.17] "The Rhyme Animal"
- [2000.06.14] "Based on a True Story"
- [2002.05.29] "The First Struggle"
- [2003.09.18] "Tokyo's Finest"
- [2006.02.15] "The New Beginning"
- [2007.10.17] "World of Music"
- [2011.12.14] "Black World/White Heat"
- [2013.11.20] "25 to Life"

=== Singles ===
- [1997.07.25] "Mappiruma"
- [1998.12.16] "The Rhyme Animal Remix E.P.1"
- [1999.02.24] "The Rhyme Animal Remix E.P.2"
- [2000.03.23] "Mr. Dynamite"
- [2001.01.25] "Neva Enuff" feat. Aktion
- [2001.08.08] "Baby Girl"
- [2003.01.22] "Big Big Money" feat. Hiro
- [2003.04.23] "Supatech (What's My Name)"
- [2003.07.30] "Perfect Queen"
- [2005.06.01] "Street Dreams"
- [2005.09.21] "Oh Yeah"
- [2006.12.06] "Stop Playin' A Wall"
- [2007.07.18] "My People" feat. Miliyah Kato
- [2007.09.19] "Not Your Boyfriend" feat. Jesse (RIZE)
- [2008.03.05] "Bushido"
- [2010.03.17] "Butterfly City" feat. Ryo the Skywalker, Mummy-D & Double
- [2010.11.17] "Fly Away"
- [2011.07.27] "Blue" feat. AI
- [2013] "I Do It"
- [2013] "Mr. Miyagi"

=== Compilations ===
- [2008.9.17] The Anthology
- [2010] Z – The Best of Zeebra
- [2013.12.25] 100 Feat-Zeebra 25th Anniversary Box

== Awards and nominations ==
2002

- MTV Video Music Awards Japan – Best Video from a Film – "Neva Enuff" (feat. Aktion)

2003

- MTV Video Music Awards Japan – Best Hip Hop Video – "F.F.B." (with King Giddra)

2004

- MTV Video Music Awards Japan – Best Hip Hop Video – "Touch the Sky" (Winner)
- MTV Video Music Awards Japan – Best Male Video – "Touch the Sky"

2006

- MTV Video Music Awards Japan – Best Hip Hop Video – "Street Dreams"

2008

- MTV Video Music Awards Japan – Best Hip Hop Video – "Not Your Boyfriend" (feat. Jesse (RIZE))

== Videography ==
=== Music videos ===
1997

- "真っ昼間" (Daytime)

1998

- "Parteechecka" [Bright Light Mix]

2000

- "Zeus 2000" (feat. Sugar Soul)
- "Mr. Dynamite"
- "Children's Story"

2001

- "Neva Enuff" (feat. Aktion)
- "Baby Girl"
- "城南ハスラー 2" (Seongnam Hustler 2) (feat. Dabo, Uzi, Gkmaryan)

2002

- "Unstoppable" (Zeebra with K Dub Shine & DJ Oasis as 'King Giddra')
- "FFB" (Zeebra with K Dub Shine & DJ Oasis as 'King Giddra')
- "911" (Remix) (Zeebra with K Dub Shine & DJ Oasis as 'King Giddra')
- "Generation Next" (Zeebra with K Dub Shine & DJ Oasis as 'King Giddra')

2003

- "Big Big Money" (feat. Hiro [from 'Full of Harmony]')
- "Supatech (What's My Name?)"
- "Perfect Queen"
- "Touch the Sky"
- "Goldenmic" (w/ DJ Masterkey)

2005

- "Street Dreams"
- "Oh Yeah!"

2006

- "Do What U Gotta Do" (feat. Namie Amuro, AI & Mummy-D [from 'Rhymester'])
- "Stop Playin' a Wall"

2007

- "My People" (feat. Kato Miliyah)
- "Not Your Boyfriend" (feat. Jesse [from 'RIZE'])
- "Shinin' Like a Diamond" (feat. May J & Sphere of Influence)

2008

- "Bushido"
- "Jackin' 4 Beats"

2010

- "Butterfly City" (feat. Double, Ryo the Skywalker & Mummy-D [from 'Rhymester'])
- "Fly Away"

2011

- "Gang on the Backstreet" (feat. Tokyo Ska Paradise Orchestra)
- "Blue" (feat. AI)

2012

- "Money in My Pocket" (feat. NaNa)

2013

- "Moonlight"
- "Young Soldier"
- "Mr. Miyagi"

2014

- "Hate That Booty" (feat. Y's & Kohh)
- "Diamond in the Sand" (feat. May J)
