= You Can Do That =

"You can do that"

Single by Soulhead

from the album Braided
- Released: 21 January 2004 (JP)
- Recorded: 2004
- Genre: R&B, Hip hop
- Label: Sony Japan
- Songwriter: Soulhead

Soulhead singles chronology
"Get Up! (Soulhead EP)" (2003)	"You can do that" (2004)	"No Way" (2004)

You can do that (sometime stylized as YOU CAN DO THAT) is Soulhead's eighth single. It was released on January 21, 2004 and contained two new songs. It charted at #36 on Oricon and was their last single released for their album Braided.

Both the a-side and the b-side made it to the corresponding album.

== Information ==
Both songs were written by Soulhead, arranged by both Soulhead and Octopussy and are R&B. You can do that is about continuing on, despite some things in life trying to pull you down. words of love is about loving someone, even when they're gone.

Though on the cover for the CD the title track is stylized as You can do that, it is written as YOU CAN DO THAT on the album Braided, as well as websites that feature the song. The music video for the song, however, titles it as You can do that.

== Track listing ==
=== CD ===
(Source)

1. You can do that
2. words of love
3. You can do that (Instrumental)
4. words of love (Instrumental)

=== 12" Vinyl ===
Side A

1. "You can do that"
2. "You can do that" (Instrumental)
3. "You can do that" (A Capella)

Side B

1. "words of love"
2. "words of love" (Instrumental)
3. "words of love" (A Capella)
