= Japanese hip-hop =

Music genre

- Stylistic origins: Hip-hop; J-pop
- Cultural origins: Early 1980s, Tokyo, Japan

Other topics
- Hip-hop

Japanese hip-hop refers to the presence of hip-hop culture in Japan. While primarily focused on elements of hip-hop music like rap and production, Japan has also fostered strong scenes in DJing, hip-hop dance, and graffiti.

== History ==
=== Origins ===
Before the production of domestic Japanese hip-hop music, there was already a hip-hop presence in Japan. In one example, the smash-hit single Rapper's Delight underwent a release in Japan in 1980, following its ascension to the Billboard Top 40 chart in the U.S. In another, the domestic radio FEN exposed many people in Japan to music at its time of release including but not limited to hip-hop, such as the influental rapper Seikō Itō.

Yellow Magic Orchestra is often credited with experimenting in music in ways that ultimately benefited the production of early hip-hop. Their use of sampling and drum machines lent their music production a unique quality that quickly found critical success in America, eventually granting them a performance on the TV show Soul Train. This critical success and performance eventually led the group to leave an impact on hip-hop pioneer Afrika Bambaataa.

=== 1980s ===
It is often said that Japanese hip-hop got its start through fashion designer Hiroshi Fujiwara, who brought hip-hop records back to Japan after his time in New York in 1982. Pioneering DJs like Fujiwara found audiences in Tokyo as part of a larger wave of Japanese appreciation of black music which started in the 1970s around scenes such as Japanese reggae and Japanese R&B.

An alternative history follows radio personality Katsuya Kobayashi of Snakeman Show. After being introduced to scratching and rap by a staff member, Kobayashi would try out hip-hop production with the track "Sakisaka to Momouchi no Go-kigen Ikaga One Two Three" on the album Snakeman Show in 1981. Following this, he would once again try to make hip-hop with his group The Number One Band through the track "Uwasa no Come To Hawaii" on the album Momo in 1982. Kobayashi states that the inspiration for this track came from his listening to second and third generation Japanese-American immigrants in Hawaii, whose speech had become a mix of both English and Japanese.

Aside from hip-hop music, the years 1983 and 1984 served as a starting point for hip-hop dance in Japan, as the movies Flashdance, Wild Style, and Breakin' (titled Breakdance in Japan) caused many to take interest in breakdancing. Wild Style in particular caused many to take interest with hip-hop culture as a whole due to its simultaneous depiction of hip-hop music, scratching, graffiti, and breakdance. In his book Hip-Hop Japan, Ian Condry argues that these movies served as the start of a proper hip-hop scene in Japan, as attendees took immediate interest in attempts at breakdancing. According to Condry, future rapper Kan Takagi had such an awakening, being more quickly able to parse and recognize breakdance as being interesting than his prior exposure to DJing and rapping. One breakdancer in particular, Crazy-A, advocated for arranging weekly breakdance meetups at Yoyogi Park, and his eventual success would lead to him and his crew being recognized as an equal to the Rock Steady Crew through the name Rock Steady Crew Japan.

While some other Japanese musicians such as Yellow Magic Orchestra or Toshiki Kadomatsu would experiment with hip-hop production throughout the early 1980s, it was not until the mid 1980s that dedicated publication of hip-hop music would start. Rapper Seikō Itō (who was influenced by Katsuya Kobayashi's rap) would contribute a hip-hop track to the compilation Gyōkai-kun Monogatari in 1985, followed by two more for the album Kensetsu-teki by Seikō Ito and Tiny Panx (Hiroshi Fujiwara and Kan Takagi) in 1986. Subsequently, Tiny Panx, along with Melon members Masayuki Kudo, Toshio Nakanishi, and Gota Yashiki would then form record company File Records in January of 1988 and record label Major Force in August of 1988.

The popularization of hip-hop culture continued with Afrika Bambaataa and Run-DMC's tours in Japan. These shows helped bring more popular interest to Japanese rap, with Seikō Itō and others even serving as the opening act for Run-DMC's tour. Condry recounts how attendees were put off by this opening act, in a way inspiring rappers to take to rapping in order to one-up the underwhelming rap they had seen.

The late 1980s saw the first releases that set Japanese hip-hop as their primary genre of choice. The compilation album Heavy by President BPM compiled most of the preceding vinyl record singles off of President BPM's label "BPM", thus including artists like Tiny Panx, Seiko Ito, and Haruomi Hosono. Following this was Seiko Ito's album Mess/age in 1989, which was produced by Yann Tomita. This album is considered was surprising step for Japanese hip-hop, containing production argued to be ahead of its time, comparable to the works of The Neptunes.

By the late 1980s, appreciation of hip-hop had made it beyond just the Tokyo underground where the Japanese hip-hop scene was developing. For example, Hiroshi Fujiwara's guest DJ work at discos in Nagoya served as the trigger for DJ Hazu to develop an interest in hip-hop music, who along with classmate Twigy formed the unit Beatkicks in 1987.

=== 1990s ===
It was from 1990 onward that many Japanese hip-hop releases began getting released. Major Force published albums by ECD, Kan Takagi, and Scha Dara Parr, as well as the Check Your Mike and Major Force Compact compilation album series. These latter compilations highlighted the emergent bonds between the Japanese hip-hop and Japanese reggae scenes through the inclusion of tracks by prolific artists Boy Ken and Chappie. This time would also see the founding of record label Rhythm by DJ Doc Holiday, which published some of the first releases by prolific rapper You the Rock.

1990 also saw the start of the DMC Japan DJ Championships, a national branch of the larger DMC World DJ Championships.

1994 saw the emergence of three significant events for the Japanese hip-hop scene. First was the formation of Japan Dance Delight, a national street dance competition where contestants could employ a variety of street dance styles including but not limited to hip-hop dance. Second, the national Music magazine FRONT began publication in Japan. This magazine, a spin-off of the prior Crossbeat magazine, was formed in order to focus on black music genres such as hip-hop and R&B. And third, was the release of East End X Yuri's hit single Da.Yo.Ne in August. The single achieved double platinum certification through the standards of the RIAJ at the time, indicating over 800,000 units sold, in April of 1995. This success brought them all the way to the 46th NHK Kōhaku Uta Gassen in December of 1995, becoming the first hip-hop track to get onto the program.

The success of Da.Yo.Ne as well as Scha Dara Parr's Konya wa Boogie Back highlighted a split felt by others in the Japanese hip-hop scene. Some had felt that the work of mainstream rappers had strayed far from the plight of the more authentic underground rappers, prompting derision from underground rappers toward those that had found success at the time. This came to a head through the release of the single Shogen (Testimony) in 1996 by Lamp Eye, featuring prolific rappers like Dev-Large. Shogen criticizes the rampant money-minded actions of mainstream rappers in Japan at the time, calling them out for compromising hip-hop culture in favor of financial success. This track co-incided with the legendary Japanese hip-hop live event Thumpin' Camp in July, which featured many of the underground rappers that had contributed to the production of Shogen. Thumpin' Camp itself featured ECD making a jab at the pop rapper M.c.A • T and his coining of the term "J-Rap", asserting that J-Rap had died and he had killed it.

As highlighted by this divide, the Japanese hip-hop scene had ballooned in activity since the early 1990s. Throughout the mid to late 1990s, many influential artists got their debut albums published, including but not limited to: Microphone Pager and King Giddra in 1995, Soul Scream in 1996, Naked Artz and Shakkazombie in 1997, Zeebra and Rappagariya in 1998, and Shing02 and Nigo in 1999. In addition, the late 90s saw various regional scenes finally bring releases to completion, as seen in Nagoya's Tha Masta Blusta by Illmariachi, Sapporo's Stilling, Still Dreaming by Tha Blue Herb, and Hamamatsu's Pain Killer by Beatmaster.

The late 90's saw a sharp decline in samples in Japanese hip-hop releases. According to Zeebra, this period saw a transition toward a need to clear samples before releasing tracks commercially. According to Ian Condry, this was specifically as a result of George Benson's visit to Japan for a performance at Blue Note Tokyo, where he heard East End x Yuri's single Da.Yo.Ne, which sampled his song Turn Your Love Around. After confirming that this track never obtained sampling clearances, action was taken and Epic/Sony was forced to pay around $100,000 to Benson.

1997 saw the formation of the annual breakdance event B-Boy Park at Yoyogi Park. In January of 1999, the music magazine FRONT changed its name to Blast in order to avoid trademark concerns with the British magazine of the same name.

=== 2000s ===
In the 2000s, Japanese hip-hop underwent a variety of changes variably influenced by contemporaneous changes in America's hip-hop scene. The underground scene saw the emergence of many gangsta rap centered acts in the early 2000s, often mimicking aspects of its culture like the East Coast–West Coast hip-hop rivalry. The gangsta rap scene was largely helped by the establishment of the label Def Jam Japan in 2000, which ended up publishing for artists like Tokona-X and Dabo (rapper). Also in the underground scene, the 2000s were host to wider experimentation in the hip-hop scene. Following in the legacy of Seikō Itō's 1989 album Mess/age, artists like Think Tank and Origami further experimented with hip-hop production.

The mainstream saw a proliferation of pop rap groups in the limelight, with groups like Dragon Ash, Soul'd Out, and Rip Slyme achieving great national success. This wave of pop rap was also the platform for hip-hop's continued presence at the NHK Kōhaku Uta Gassen, as acts Kick the Can Crew, Nobodyknows, M-Flo, and Seamo achieved performances across the 2000s. Most well known of these groups in the west is Teriyaki Boyz, a Japanese pop rap group that achieved recognition internationally through participating member Nigo's work with the clothing brand A Bathing Ape. The Japanese pop rap boom coincided with a greater domestic interest in hip-hop, with some record store owners remarking that Japanese hip-hop had begun outselling its overseas counterparts at the time.

=== 2010s ===
The 2010s saw the development of two major avenues of advertising and promotion in the Japanese hip-hop scene. First, the explosion in popularity of battle rap served as a means of attaining popularity for many, such as rapper Ryoff Karma's use of the scene to advertise his commercial works. Second, the popularization of the Internet led to resources like SoundCloud and Myspace serving as a popular means of distributing and advertising one's works to a wider audience. Also seen through Ryoff Karma, his label Jet City People would often publish exclusive, live, and/or promo tracks for the label's various members, serving as a consistent avenue of publicity for the entirety of the label's participants.

=== 2020s ===
Nostalgia for the 90's Japanese hip-hop scene has resulted in a variety of reunions and re-releases across the 2020s.

In 2025, the DMC World DJ Championships were held in Tokyo.

== Politics in Japanese Rap ==
Japanese rappers have been discussing politics in their rap for as long as they have been rapping. In 1982, Katsuya Kobayashi in his song "Uwasa no Come To Hawaii" plays the role of a Japanese Hawaiian, who apologizes for the attack on Pearl Harbor and appeals to his Hawaiian identity to deflect responsibility. Similarly, Haruo Chikada's track Masscommunication Breakdown in 1986 criticized the sensationalism of Japanese media and the misusing of power by Japanese press.

== Internationally relevant J-hiphop artists ==
Japanese hip-hop pioneer DJ Krush has achieved international recognition as a result of signing with hip-hop label Mo' Wax, as well as his instrumentals and remixes for artists like Miles Davis and Herbie Hancock.

Early Kimidori member Miho Hatori achieved fame after her move to America through her work with groups Cibo Matto and Gorillaz. She still keeps in touch with her roots in the Japanese hip-hop scene, at times offering insight into the scene.

Most prominent among Japanese hip-hop artists with international recognition is producer Nujabes. Nujabes achieved fame in the west through his work on the soundtrack for the anime Samurai Champloo, one of many animes hand picked for the TV programming block Toonami on Adult Swim. His albums Metaphorical Music and Modal Soul subsequently became well regarded among western fans, as did his frequent collaborations with Japanese rapper Shing02. Nujabes later attained significant fame online as a result of the emergence of the Lofi hip-hop trend in the late 2010s and early 2020s, which was largely defined by his and J Dilla's music production.

The 2000's Japanese pop rap boom also brought many Japanese pop rap groups to international audiences. Groups like Soul'd Out, Nobodyknows, and Home Made Kazoku often provided opening and ending themes for contemporary anime, at times resulting in the formation of overseas fan clubs for these groups. These groups then sometimes responded to this phenomenon with special attention, arranging international tours and special overseas releases that wouldn't have been made otherwise.

In 2024, Megan Thee Stallion released the song Mamushi with Japanese rapper Yuki Chiba.

== See also ==
- List of Japanese hip-hop musicians
- Anime and hip-hop
