= Sora (song) =

Single by Soulhead

from the album Oh My Sister
- Released: February 5, 2003 (JP)
- Recorded: 2003
- Genre: J-pop, R&B
- Label: Sony Music Entertainment; AICL-1387 (Japan, CD)

Soulhead singles chronology
"Lover, Knight, Man" (2002)	"Sora" (2003)	"Oh My Sister (Remix)/I'm just going down" (2003)

"Sora" (空 / sky), is a Japanese-language song by female duo Soulhead, and their third single under Sony Music Entertainment Japan. It managed to reach #28 on the Oricon charts and charted for six weeks.

== Information ==
Sora is an R&B song by Soulhead under SMEJ. It contained the title track and a remix to their debut song, Step to the New World; the remix was done by Octopussy, who Soulhead would work closely with throughout their career. Sora also received a remix on their first remix album, Re-Construct Album Vol.1 Reflection.

Sora was released as both a CD and 12" vinyl.

== Track listing ==
=== CD ===
1. "Sora"
2. "Step to the New World" (Remix)
3. "Sora" (Instrumental)

=== 12" ===
Side A

1. "Sora"
2. "Sora" (Instrumental)
3. "Sora" (A Capella)

Side B

1. "Step to the New World" (Remix)
2. "Step to the New World" (Remix Instrumental)
3. "Step to the New World" (Original Mix)

== Charts and sales ==
Oricon Ranking (Weekly)	Sales
28	
