= Step to the New World =

Single by Soulhead

from the album Oh My Sister
- Released: August 21, 2002 (JP)
- Recorded: 2002
- Genre: J-pop, R&B
- Label: Sony Music Entertainment; AICL-1387 (Japan, CD); V10314WU (Japan, vinyl)

Soulhead singles chronology
| "Inside Out" (2002) | "Step to the New World" (2002) | "Lover, Knight, Man" (2002) |

"Step to the New World" (stylized as STEP TO THE NEW WORLD) is female duo Soulhead's first single and third single in total (having released two singles under the name Batti Baas: Lovin' You and Inside Out). It was used to advertise Triumph's Tenshi no Bra (天使のブラ / Angel Bra).

== Information ==
This was their first single under the name Soulhead. They had previously released two singles under the name Batti Baas, with Lovin' You under Handcut Records and Inside Out under the Tokuma label. Sony Music Entertainment Japan had signed the sisters in early 2002, then sent them to New Zealand and Australia to study and become proficient in English.

Step to the New World was later featured on their album Oh My Sister, while a remix of the song was put on their single Sora. The CD single contained the title track and one b-side: '"Too Late" (stylized as "TOO LATE"). The single was also released on vinyl, with an a cappella version to both the a-side and b-side.

== Track listing ==
=== CD ===
(Source)

1. "Step to the New World"
2. "Too Late"
3. "Step to the New World" (instrumental)
4. "Too Late" (instrumental)

=== 12" vinyl ===
Side A

1. "Step to the New World"
2. "Step to the New World" (instrumental)
3. "Step to the New World" (a cappella)

Side B

1. "Too Late"
2. "Too Late" (instrumental)
3. "Too Late" (a cappella)
