= Braided (album) =

Studio album by Soulhead
- Released: April 28, 2004
- Recorded: 2003–2004
- Genres: R&B, hip hop
- Label: Sony Music Entertainment Japan

Soulhead chronology
Re-Construct Album Vol.1 Reflection (2003)	Braided (2004)	Naked (2006)

Singles from Braided
- 1. "Get Up!" Released: July 30, 2003; 2. "You Can Do That" Released: January 21, 2004; 3. "No Way" Released: March 24, 2004; 4. "At the Party" Released: June 2, 2004

Braided is the second studio album by female duo Soulhead and was under the Sony Music Entertainment Japan sub-label onenation. The album reached #4 on Oricon.

Much like Oh My Sister, Braided also received a release on vinyl. It was their second album to do so. The vinyl included two records with four sides in total.

== Track listing ==
=== CD ===
(Official)

1. "Braided" (Intro)
2. "You Can Do That"
3. "At the Party"
4. "Jiggy Uh..pt.1" (Skit)
5. "Kokuhaku" (告白 / Confession)
6. "Itsudemo Kimi no Koto wo" (いつでも君のことを / It's you at any time)
7. "No Way"
8. "A Pretense of Love"
9. "I&I" (Interlude)
10. "Forgive Me"
11. "Words of Love"
12. "Jiggy Uh..pt.2" (Skit)
13. "D.O.G" (album version)
14. "Stay There"
15. "For All My Ladies"
16. "Jiggy Uh..pt. 3" (Skit)
17. "Kono Mama" (このまま / It Remains)
18. "Get Up!"

=== 12" ===
Side A

1. "Braided" (Intro)
2. "You Can Do That"
3. "At the Party"
4. "Jiggy Uh..pt.1" (Skit)
5. "Kokuhaku"

Side B

1. "Itsumademo Kimi no Koto wo"
2. "Forgive Me"
3. "A Pretense of Love"
4. "I & I" (Interlude)

Side C

1. "No Way"
2. "You Can Do That"
3. "Jiggy Uh..pt.2" (Skit)
4. "D.O.G" (Album Version)
5. "Stay There"

Side D

1. "For All My Ladies"
2. "Jiggy Uh..pt.3" (Skit)
3. "Kono Mama"
4. "Get Up!" (bonus track)
