= M-Flo discography =

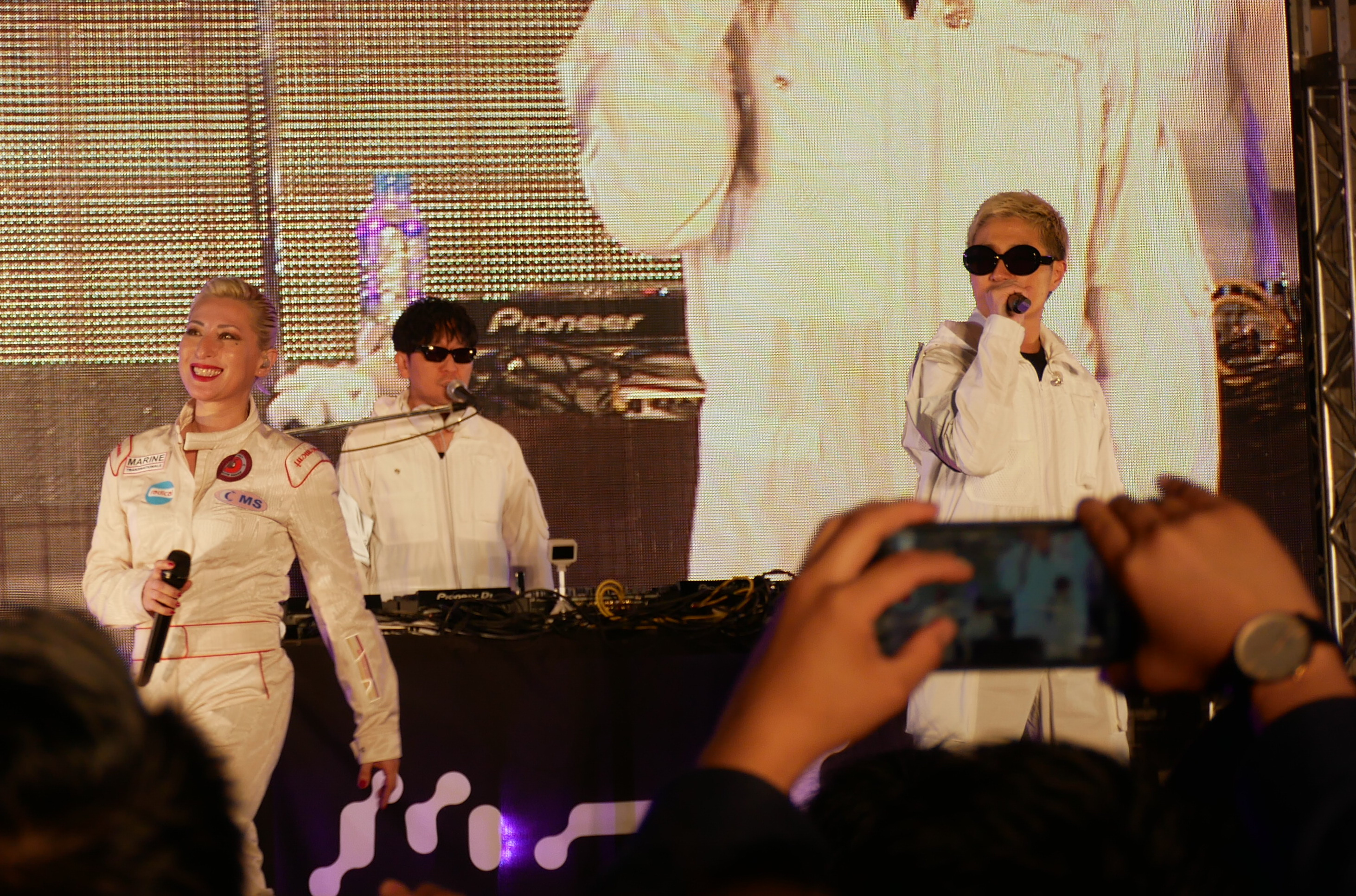
- Studio albums: 10
- Live albums: 1
- Compilation albums: 9
- Tribute albums: 2
- Singles: 25
- Video albums: 7

The discography of M-Flo features ten studio albums, nine compilation albums, one live album and 25 singles. These were released on Labsoul Records and Avex Group independent label Rhythm Republic in 1998, and from 1999 onwards released through Rhythm Zone.

== Studio albums ==
List of albums, with selected chart positions
Title	Album details	Peak positions			Sales	Certifications
Title	Album details	JPN	TWN (Note: The G-Music chart was established in July 2005 and only archives the top 20 releases.)	TWN East Asia (Note: Position was taken from 2005 week 44 for Beat Space Nine, 2007 week 15 for Cosmicolor, 2012 week 14 for Square One, 2013 week 15 for Neven.)	Sales	Certifications
Planet Shining	Released: February 23, 2000; Label: Rhythm Zone(CD), Labsoul Records(Vinyl); Formats: CD, digital download, LP	6	—	—	JPN: 358,000	RIAJ: Gold
Expo Expo	Released: March 28, 2001; Label: Rhythm Zone(CD), Labsoul Records(Vinyl); Formats: CD, digital download, LP	3	—	—	JPN: 558,000	RIAJ: Platinum
Astromantic	Released: May 26, 2004; Label: Rhythm Zone; Formats: CD, digital download	2	—	—	JPN: 347,000	RIAJ: Platinum
Beat Space Nine	Released: August 24, 2005; Label: Rhythm Zone; Formats: CD, digital download	1	—	8	JPN: 350,000	RIAJ: Platinum
Cosmicolor	Released: March 28, 2007; Label: Rhythm Zone; Formats: CD, CD/DVD, digital download	3	—	7	JPN: 172,000	RIAJ: Platinum
Square One	Released: March 14, 2012; Label: Rhythm Zone; Formats: CD, CD/DVD, digital download	10	—	19	JPN: 26,000	
Neven	Released: March 13, 2013; Label: Rhythm Zone; Formats: CD, CD/DVD, digital download	19	—	18	JPN: 12,000	
Future Is Wow	Released: March 26, 2014; Label: Rhythm Zone; Formats: CD, CD/DVD, CD/Blu-ray, digital download	27	—	—	JPN: 7,000	
Kyo	Released: November 6, 2019; Label: Rhythm Zone; Formats: CD, digital download	34	—	—	JPN: 2,000	
Superliminal	Released: February 11, 2026; Label: Rhythm Zone; Formats: CD, digital download	16	—	—	JPN: 3,162	

== Compilation albums ==
List of albums, with selected chart positions
Title	Album details	Peak positions			Sales	Certifications
Title	Album details	JPN	TWN	TWN East Asia (Note: Position was taken from 2008 week 8 for Award Supernova.)	Sales	Certifications
The Intergalactic Collection	Released: March 5, 2003; Label: Rhythm Zone; Formats: CD, DVD-Audio, digital download	4	—	—	JPN: 155,000	RIAJ: Gold
Award Supernova: Loves Best	Released: February 13, 2008; Label: Rhythm Zone; Formats: CD, digital download	1	—	6	JPN: 178,000	RIAJ: Gold
MF10: 10th Anniversary Best	Released: October 7, 2009; Label: Rhythm Zone; Formats: CD, digital download	5	—	—	JPN: 83,000	RIAJ: Gold
Universe	Released: December 14, 2017; Label: Rhythm Zone; Formats: CD, digital download	—	—	—	—	

=== Outside collaborations compilation albums ===
List of albums, with selected chart positions
Title	Album details	Peak positions	Sales	Certifications
Title	Album details	JPN	Sales	Certifications
Soto Shigoto: M-Flo Turns It Out! (ソトシゴト; "Outside Work")	Released: February 27, 2002; Label: Rhythm Zone; Formats: CD, digital download	30	JPN: 23,000	
M-Flo Inside	Released: March 17, 2004; Label: Rhythm Zone; Formats: CD, digital download	16	JPN: 33,000	
M-Flo Inside: Works Best II	Released: July 26, 2006; Label: Rhythm Zone; Formats: CD, digital download	4	JPN: 150,000	RIAJ: Gold
M-Flo Inside: Works Best III	Released: March 18, 2009; Label: Rhythm Zone; Formats: CD, digital download	19	JPN: 21,000	
M-Flo Inside: Works Best IV	Released: September 8, 2010; Label: Rhythm Zone; Formats: CD, digital download	13	JPN: 16,000	
M-Flo Inside: Works Best V	Released: March 27, 2013; Label: Rhythm Zone; Formats: CD, digital download	72	JPN: 3,000	

== Remix albums ==
List of albums, with selected chart positions
Title	Album details	Peak positions			Sales
Title	Album details	JPN	TWN	TWN East Asia (Note: Position was taken from 2005 week 48 for Dope Space Nine.)	Sales
The Replacement Percussionists	Released: August 9, 2000; Label: Rhythm Zone; Formats: CD, digital download	8	—	—	JPN: 71,000
Expo Bōei Robot Gran Sonik	Released: November 28, 2001; Label: Rhythm Zone; Formats: CD, digital download	25	—	—	JPN: 21,000
Astromantic Charm School	Released: September 15, 2004; Label: Rhythm Zone; Formats: CD, digital download	24	—	—	JPN: 26,000
Dope Space Nine	Released: November 2, 2005; Label: Rhythm Zone; Formats: CD, digital download	24	—	19	JPN: 21,000
ElectriColor	Released: September 26, 2007; Label: Rhythm Zone; Formats: CD, digital download	42	—	—	JPN: 11,000
BACK2THEFUTURETHEALBUM	Released: February 28, 2018; Label: Rhythm Zone; Formats: digital download	11	—	—	—

=== Non-stop remix albums ===
List of albums, with selected chart positions
Title	Album details	Peak positions	Sales
Title	Album details	JPN	Sales
M-Flo DJ Mix: Bon! Enkai	Released: December 19, 2012; Label: Rhythm Zone; Formats: CD, digital download	34	JPN: 11,000
M-Flo DJ Mix: Asobon! Enkai	Released: November 27, 2013; Label: Rhythm Zone; Formats: CD, digital download	84	JPN: 3,000
EDM-Flo	Released: March 26, 2014; Label: Rhythm Zone; Formats: CD, digital download	77	JPN: 2,000

== Live album ==
List of albums, with selected chart positions
Title	Album details	Peak positions	Sales
Title	Album details	JPN	Sales
M-Flo Tour 2001 Expo Expo	Released: August 29, 2001; Label: Rhythm Zone; Formats: CD, digital download	19	JPN: 35,000

== Tribute albums ==
List of albums, with selected chart positions
Title	Album details	Peak positions	Sales
Title	Album details	JPN	Sales
Tribute: Maison de M-Flo	Released: September 16, 2009; Label: Rhythm Zone; Formats: CD, digital download	8	JPN: 42,000
Tribute: Stitch the Future and Past	Released: April 20, 2011; Label: Rhythm Zone; Formats: CD, digital download	30	JPN: 10,000

== Singles ==
=== As a lead artist ===
List of singles, with selected chart positions
Title	Year	Peak chart positions		Sales	Certifications	Album
Title	Year	JPN	JPN Hot (Note: The Japan Hot 100 was established in February 2008.) (Note: Sources for chart positions are as follows: "She's So (Outta Control)," "Lover," "Go Crazy")	Sales	Certifications	Album
"The Tripod EP"	1999	9	—	144,000		Planet Shining
"Mirrorball Satellite 2012"	1999	9	—	53,000		Non-album single
"Chronopsychology"	1999	24	—	58,000		Planet Shining
"LOT (Love or Truth)"	1999	20	—	84,000		Planet Shining
"Hands"	2000	33	—	20,000		Planet Shining
"Come Back to Me"	2000	30	—	27,000		Planet Shining
"Quantum Leap"	2000	31	—	16,000		Planet Shining
"How You Like Me Now?"	2000	9	—	224,000	RIAJ (physical): Gold	Expo Expo
"Come Again"	2001	4	61 (Note: Charted in 2012.)	390,000	RIAJ (physical): Platinum; RIAJ (download): Platinum; RIAJ (streaming): Platinum	Expo Expo
"Orbit-3"	2001	9	—	64,000		Expo Expo
"Prism"	2001	15	—	26,000		Expo Expo
"Dispatch" (featuring Dev Large, Nipps & Vincento Galluo)	2001	34	—	10,000		Expo Expo
"Yours Only,"	2001	25	—	20,000		Expo Expo
"Lies"	2001	25	—	20,000		Expo Bōei Robot Gran Sonik
"Reeewind!" (loves Crystal Kay)	2003	9	—	50,000		Astromantic
"Miss You" (loves Melody, Ryohei Yamamoto)	2003	8	—	71,000	RIAJ (download): Gold	Astromantic
"The Love Bug" (loves BoA)	2004	8	—	56,000		Astromantic
"Let Go" (loves Yoshika)	2004	12	—	124,000	RIAJ (ringtone): 3× Platinum; RIAJ (download): 2× Platinum; RIAJ (PC): Gold; RIAJ (physical): Gold	Beat Space Nine
"Dopamine" (loves Emyli, Diggy-Mo')	2005	20	—	31,000		Beat Space Nine
"Loop in My Heart" (loves Emyli & Yoshika)	2005	9	—	29,000		Beat Space Nine
"Hey!" (loves Akiko Wada)	2005	9	—	29,000		Beat Space Nine
"Summer Time Love" (loves Emi Hinouchi, Ryohei)	2006	12	—	26,000		Cosmicolor
"Love Song" (loves Bonnie Pink)	2006	9	—	25,000		Cosmicolor
"She's So (Outta Control)" (featuring 2NE1)	2012	—	43	—		Square One
"Lover" (featuring Miliyah Kato)	2013	81	15	1,200		Neven
"Go Crazy" (featuring Sol)	2014	—	57	—		Future Is Wow
"The Tripod E.P. 2"	2018	—	—	—		Kyo
"Mortal Portal E.P."	2019	—	—	—		Kyo

=== As a collaborating artist ===
List of singles, with selected chart positions
Title	Year	Peak chart positions		Sales	Certifications	Album
Title	Year	JPN	JPN Hot	Sales	Certifications	Album
"I Like It" (Crystal Kay loves M-Flo)	2003	8	—	58,000		4 Real
"Freak!" (Emi Hinouchi)	2003	192	—	600		Dramatiques
"Now or Never" (Note: Released as a part of a triple A-side single, "Your Name Never Gone/Now or Never/You Got Me.") (Chemistry meets M-Flo)	2003	2	—	190,000	RIAJ (physical): Platinum	One X One
"Usotsuki Boy" (ウソツキBOY; "Lying Boy") (Sunday)	2005	87	—	5,000		Non-album single
"Big Bang Romance" (Maki Nomiya loves M-Flo)	2005	46	—	7,000		Party People
"Picture Perfect" (Monkey Majik + M-Flo)	2007	23	—	10,000		Sora wa Marude
"Merry-Go-Round" (Note: Released as a part of a double A-side single, "Feel the Love/Merry-Go-Round.") (Ayumi Hamasaki)	2013	5	—	37,000		Colours

=== Promotional singles ===
Title	Year	Peak chart positions		Album
Title	Year	JPN Hot (Note: Sources for chart positions are as follows: "Love Comes and Goes"; "Sound Boy Thriller"; "Alive"; "A Whole New World")	US Dance Club	Album
"The Way We Were" (featuring Ceybil Jefferies)	1998	—	—	Non-album single
"Been So Long"	1998	—	—	Planet Shining
"Come Again...and Again!"	2003	—	—	The Intergalactic Collection
"Way U Move" (loves Dragon Ash)	2004	—	—	Astromantic
"Get On! (Ugly Duckling Remix)" (loves Crystal Kay, Ugly Duckling)	2004	—	—	Astromantic Charm School
"I Wanna Be Down" (loves Ryuichi Sakamoto)	2004	—	12	Astromantic
"ADDP" (loves Monday Michiru)	2005	—	—	Beat Space Nine
"Tripod Baby" (loves Lisa)	2005	—	—	Beat Space Nine
"One Day (Kreva Remix)" (loves Miliyah Kato)	2005	—	—	Dope Space Nine
"Lotta Love" (loves Minmi)	2006	—	—	M-Flo Inside: Works Best II
"Love Long and Prosper" (loves Star Trek)	2006	—	—	Cosmicolor
"Love Don't Cry" (loves Crystal Kay)	2007	—	—	Cosmicolor
"Love to Live By" (loves Chara)	2007	—	—	Cosmicolor
"Loves Comes and Goes" (loves Emi Hinouchi, Ryohei, Emyli, Lisa and Yoshika)	2008	43	—	Award Supernova: Loves Best
"Sound Boy Thriller" (feeeeeeeeeeat. Lisa)	2009	22	—	MF10
"Alive" (featuring Exile Atsushi)	2012	81	—	Square One
"All I Want Is You" (featuring Minami)	2012	—	—	Square One
"Tonite" (featuring Minmi)	2012	—	—	Neven
"Chance"	2013	—	—	Neven
"A Whole New World" (featuring Matt Cab)	2013	94	—	Electronic Disney Music
"Irony" (featuring Daoko)	2013	—	—	Future Is Wow
"Fly" (featuring Yoohei Kawakami)	2014	—	—	Future Is Wow

=== Digital singles ===
Title	Year	Peak chart positions		Album
Title	Year	JPN	JPN Hot (Note: The Japan Hot 100 was established in February 2008.) (Note: Sources for chart positions are as follows: "No Question," "Mars Drive,")	Album
"Synergy"	2016	—	—	Universe
"Never"	2018	42	—	Non-album single
"No Question"	2018	14	12	Kyo
"Mars Drive"	2018	45	96	Non-album single
"Piece Of Me"	2018	—	—	Non-album single
"PSYCHIC MAGIC" (presents PRINCE PROJECT feat. Ryota Katayose)	2018	48	—	Non-album single
"epic"	2018	—	—	Non-album single
"STRSTRK"	2019	—	—	Kyo
"against all gods"	2019	—	—	Kyo
"TOXIC SWEET" (feat. JP THE WAVY)	2019	—	—	Kyo
"HUMAN LOST" (feat. J Balvin)	2019	—	—	Non-album single
"tell me, tell me" (loves Sik-K & eill & Taichi Mukai)	2020	—	—	Non-album single
"Runaways" (loves chelmico)	2020	—	—	Non-album single
"HyperNova" (loves Maya)	2024	—	—	Non-album single

== Other appearances ==
List of non-studio album or guest appearances that feature M-Flo together as a unit. Some collaborations were compiled on their outside collaborations albums.
Title	Year	Album	Notes
"Living Large" (SMAP)	1999	Birdman: SMAP 013	
"Shizuka na Maboroshi" (静かなまぼろし; "Quiet Phantom")	1999	Dear Yuming: Yumi Arai/Yumi Matsutoya Cover Collection	Yumi Matsutoya cover
"Make Me Crazy" (Kirari)	1999	Kirariddim	Originally found on the "Last Piece" single.
"Shine in My Life" (GTS featuring Melodie Sexton & M-Flo)	1999	Future Classics	
"Mind Kids" (Kirari)	1999	Kirariddim	Originally found on the "To Be Lover" single.
"Taboo (A Tip of M-Flo Remix)" (Ken Hirai)	2000	Kh Re-mixed Up 1	Originally found on the "Love or Lust" single.
"Follow Me" (Jinusean featuring M-Flo)	2001	The Reign	
"Violet Nude (M-Flo's Soulstive X-tended Mix)" (Momoe Shimano)	2002	Guest Re-Control	
"Reeeplay! (by DJ Hasebe)" (M-Flo loves Crystal Kay)	2003	"I Like It" (single)	
"Show Me What You Got" (Emi Hinouchi)	2003	Dramatiques	
"What It Is?" (Chan featuring Shuman & M-Flo)	2004	"Part of the Nation" (single)	
"Happy Drive (Taste Your Stuff)" (Bennie K loves M-Flo)	2005	Japana-rhythm	Originally found on the "Sky" single.
"One Day (Yozora Remix)" (夜空; "Night Sky") (Miliyah Kato loves M-Flo)	2005	Rose	Originally found on the "Jōnetsu" single.
"Let Go (Acoustic Version)" (Yoshika loves M-Flo)	2006	Timeless	
"Lotta Lota (Vibes Mix)" (Minmi loves M-Flo)	2006	"I Love You Baby" (single)	
"She Dubs the Cream" (Doping Panda dubs M-Flo)	2007	"Can't Stop Me" (single)	
"Summer Time Love (Deckstream Remix featuring Arkitec & L-Vokal)" (M-Flo loves Emi Hinouchi, Ryohei)	2007	"O'kay" (single)	
"Born 2 Luv U" (Melody. loves M-Flo)	2007	"Love Story" (single)	
"Love Me After 12AM (English Version)" (M-Flo loves Alex (Clazziquai Project)	2007	Ex Machina Original Soundtrack	
"Take You Far (Percapella Ver.)"	2011	Visionair	
"Take You Far (Synthapella Ver.)"	2011	After 5 Vol. 1	
"Scream (M-Flo Remix)" (2NE1)	2012	"Scream" (single)	
"She's So (Outta Control) (BFM Remix)" (2NE1)	2012	Collection	
"Boy Meets Girl (M-Flo Remix)" (TRF)	2013	TRF Tribute Album Best	
"Alive" (Exile Atsushi featuring M-Flo)	2014	Music	
"Reckless" (M-Flo loves Adee A.)	2025	"Theme of New Panty & Stocking" (single)	

=== Sampled songs ===
List of identified songs M-Flo have sampled in their discography.
Title	Year	Original song
"Mirrorball Satellite 2012"	1999	"Love Come Down" (Evelyn King)
"Quantum Leap"	2000	"Jumbo Sam" (Magic Disco Machine)
"Orbit 3"	2001	"It's Just Begun" (The Jimmy Castor Bunch)
"Dopamine" (original single version only)	2005	"The 900 Number" (The 45 King)
"Hey!"	2005	"Natsu no Yoru no Samba" (夏の夜のサンバ; "Summer Night Samba") (Akiko Wada)
"Hey!"	2005	"Bye Bye Adam" (バイバイアダム, Bai Bai Adamu) (Akiko Wada)
"Hey!"	2005	"Sotsugyō Sasete yo" (卒業させてよ; "I'm Graduating You") (Akiko Wada)

=== Sampled M-Flo songs ===
List of identified songs where M-Flo have been sampled.
Title	Year	Original song
"For So Long" (Miliyah Kato)	2006	"Been So Long"
"So Long, Too Late" (Bright)	2009	"Been So Long"
"Wanna Come Again" (Thelma Aoyama featuring Verbal)	2009	"Come Again"
"IYKYK" (XG)	2024	"Prism"

== Video albums ==
List of media, with selected chart positions
Title	Album details	Peak positions
Title	Album details	JPN
Tunnel Vision	Music video collection and 1999 Zepp Tokyo live concert; Released: September 6, 2000; Label: Rhythm Zone; Formats: VHS, DVD	31
M-Flo Tour 2001 Expo Expo	Released: September 27, 2001; Label: Rhythm Zone; Formats: VHS, DVD	36
The Intergalactic Collector's Item	Music video collection; Released: March 19, 2003; Label: Rhythm Zone; Formats: DVD	77
Astromantic DVD	Music video collection and 2004 Studio Coast live concert; Released: February 23, 2005; Label: Rhythm Zone; Formats: DVD	28
M-Flo Tour 2005 Beat Space Nine at Nippon Budokan	Released: February 22, 2006; Label: Rhythm Zone; Formats: DVD	15
M-Flo Tour 2007 Cosmicolor @ Yokohama Arena	Released: October 31, 2007; Label: Rhythm Zone; Formats: DVD	4
M-Flo 10 Years Special Live "We Are One"	Released: April 7, 2010; Label: Rhythm Zone; Formats: DVD	17
