= Astromantic =

Studio album by M-Flo
- Released: May 26, 2004
- Recorded: 2003–04
- Genre: J-Urban
- Label: Rhythm Zone
- Producer: M-Flo

M-Flo chronology
Expo Bōei Robot Gran Sonik (2001)	Astromantic (2004)	Astromantic Charm School (2004)

Singles from Astromantic
- 1. "Reeewind!" Released: June 18, 2003; 2. "Miss You" Released: October 22, 2003; 3. "The Love Bug" Released: March 17, 2004

Astromantic is the third studio album by the Japanese hip-hop group M-Flo. It was released on May 26, 2004, through Rhythm Zone. Remixes of songs from this album were released as Astromantic Charm School. The album spawned three singles featuring different singers: "Reeewind!" with Crystal Kay, "Miss You" with singer Melody, and "The Love Bug" with BoA.

Commercially, the album peaked at number two on the Oricon Albums Chart and was certified platinum by the Recording Industry Association of Japan (RIAJ) for physical sales in June 2004.

== Background ==
Astromantic was released via Avex's record label Rhythm Zone on May 26, 2004, and marks the group's first studio album in over three years, since March 2001's Expo Expo. It is the group's first album without Lisa as the vocalist, since her departure from the trio in April 2002. Instead of finding a new vocalist, the band started to collaborate with different singers, with each collaboration credited to "m-flo loves" the featured artist. Remixes of songs from this album were later released on the Astromantic Charm School remix album, released on September 15, 2004.

"Miss You" was written by M-Flo and sung by melody. and Ryohei Yamamoto. The Japanese-American female singer "melody." has been a recording artist from 2003 until 2008.

== Commercial performance ==
Astromantic reached number 2 on the Oricon Albums Chart and stayed on the chart for a total of 34 weeks. The album sold 330,497 copies by the end of 2004, and ranked at number 42 on the year-end Oricon Albums Chart.

"Miss You" was ranked as the eighth most popular single in the Oricon charts.

== Track listing ==
1. The Third Impact
2. Miss You [M-Flo Loves Melody. & Ryohei Yamamoto]
3. Starstruck - "The Return of the Luvbytes" [M-Flo Loves Ai, Emi Hinouchi & Rum (Heartsdales)]
4. How to Be Astromantic
5. Vanessa [M-Flo Loves Bloodest Saxophone]
6. Way U Move [M-Flo Loves Dragon Ash]
7. Get On! [M-Flo Loves Crystal Kay]
8. Astrosexy [M-Flo Loves Chemistry]
9. Listen to Your Heart
10. The Love Bug [M-Flo Loves BoA]
11. Life Is Beautiful [M-Flo Loves Double & Toku]
12. I Wanna Be Down [M-Flo Loves Ryuichi Sakamoto]
13. Rendezvous 2014
14. Cosmic Night Run [M-Flo Loves Maki Nomiya & Crazy Ken Band]
15. Reeewind! [M-Flo Loves Crystal Kay]
16. Uchu No Uouo (Woah Woah of Space) [M-Flo Loves Boy-Ken & Black Bottom Brass Band]
17. Curtain Call

== Charts and certifications ==
=== Album charts ===
Chart (2004)	Peak position
Japanese Daily Albums (Oricon)	1
Japanese Weekly Albums (Oricon)	2
Japanese Yearly Albums (Oricon)	42

=== Certifications ===
Region	Certification	Certified units/sales
Japan (RIAJ)	Platinum	347,000

== Release history ==
Region	Date	Format	Catalog number	Label	Ref.
Japan	May 26, 2004	CD, digital download	RZCD-45123	Rhythm Zone	
