= Emi Hinouchi =

Japanese urban music singer-songwriter (born 1982)

- Born: 日之内絵美; September 7, 1982 (age 43); Toyonaka, Osaka, Japan
- Genres: J-pop
- Occupations: Singer, songwriter
- Years active: 2002–present
- Labels: Tachytelic Records (2002–2006); Venus-B (2006–2009); Exit Line (2011–)
- Website: www.hinouchiemi.com

Emi Hinouchi (日之内 絵美, Hinouchi Emi; born September 7, 1982), known professionally with different characters of the same name (日之内 エミ), is a Japanese singer-songwriter. She was formerly signed under King Records' sub-label Venus-B and Taku Takahashi's Tachytelic Records. She is best known for writing songs for Heartsdales and for her collaborations with M-Flo.

As of 2011, Hinouchi has released twelve singles, three studio length albums, and collaborated with numerous artists.

== Biography ==
Hinouchi was born in Osaka, Japan. She lived in Taiwan from the age of 4 to 14. It was then that Hinouchi grew an interest in global and Japanese music. After returning to Japan, she started composing music and writing lyrics, eventually completing the song "Painful" at the age of 16.

After that, she performed at several gigs as a vocalist with an indie band from Osaka. She presented the song "Painful" at an audition held by Taku Takahashi of M-Flo, one of her favorite artists and influences, and won the audition. In 2002, she made her major debut on Takahashi's label, Tachytelic Records, with the double A-side single "Magic/World". Her first album Dramatiques was released in 2003.

Following the release of Dramatiques, Hinouchi spent the next several years collaborating with several major Japanese artists, such as M-Flo, SOUL'd OUT, Crystal Kay, Heartsdales and Teriyaki Boyz. She has also provided backup vocals for M-Flo and written a number of their songs, such as "Luvotomy", "Simple & Lovely", and "Love Don't Cry". Hinouchi was featured on songs such as "Summer Time Love" with fellow singer Ryohei Yamamoto, and "Love Comes and Goes" with Yoshika, Emyli, Lisa, and Ryohei on M-Flo's compilation album, "Award Supernova: Loves Best". She has also collaborated with Korean hip-hip group Epik High for the song "Flow".

Hinouchi began a string of her own solo releases in 2007, starting with the single "O'kay." Following four singles, she released her second album, ME..., in 2008. According to a blog entry made by Hinouchi herself, King Records, the distributor of the album, dropped her from the label after it failed to sell enough copies.

Although no longer a part of King Records and Tachytelic Records, Hinouchi continued to collaborate with other artists such as DJ Komori, Hiromi, Azu, and Emyli. In 2011, she began writing music for solo releases again, albeit as an independent artist. Her first single since leaving King Records and Tachytelic Records, "Sotsugyō -congratulations-" (卒業 -congratulations-), was released on February 6, 2011. On the day of the release of her next single, "Diary...", Hinouchi announced the release of a mini-album, VOICE, to be released during the following summer.

== Discography ==
=== Singles ===
- [2002.11.20] "Magic/World"
- [2003.04.23] "Crying"
- [2003.07.30] "Freak!"
- [2003.10.29] "Painful"
- [2007.05.16] "O'kay"
- [2007.09.05] "Goodie Memories"
- [2008.04.09] "Ai Dake ga" (愛だけが)
- [2008.11.05] "Kataomoi" (片思い)
- [2011.02.06] "Sotsugyō -congratulations-" (卒業 -congratulations-)
- [2011.05.25] "Diary..."
- [2011.06.08] "Diary... (English ver.)"
- [2011.06.15] "Catch Me!!!"

=== Albums ===
- [2003.11.27] Dramatiques
- [2008.12.03] Me...
- [2011.07.13] Voice

=== Collaborations ===
- [2004.05.26] M-Flo – Astromantic (Track 03: Starstruck～"The Return of the LuvBytes")
- [2006.05.24] Ukatrats FC – Win and Shine (Single)
- [2006.06.14] We ♥ We (We Love Winning Eleven) (Win and Shine)
- [2006.06.28] M-Flo♥ Hinouchi Emi & Ryohei – Summer Time Love (Single)
- [2006.07.26] M-Flo inside -Works Best 2- (Summer Time Love -Remix Tokyo Mode-, Can't stop lovin' you)
- [2008.02.13] M-Flo♥ Yoshika, Emyli, Hinouchi Emi, Ryohei & Lisa – (Love Comes and Goes)
- [2008.09.24] Makai – Twinkle Stars
- [2009.01.28] Tarantula Orchestra – Sunshine Sunlight
- [2009.03.25] Makai – Dreamin'
- [2009.03.25] 12 Violinists – The Boss, Hurt
- [2009.09.09] Nycca – Tsunaide (つないで)
- [2010.03.03] Home Made Kazoku – Crazy feat. Emi Hinouchi
- [2010.04.28] Emi Hinouchi & Emyli & Hiromi – I Belong 2 U
- [2010.06.02] DJ Komori – Blue Magic
- [2010.12.08] Zero – Boyz Be Ambitious
- [2010.12.29] Hiromi – More & More
- [2011.02.23] Azu – Candy Boy

=== Works and compositions ===
- [2003.03.26] Mic Banditz – Sixth Sense (track 2: What's Your Secret?)
- [2003.07.28] Heartsdales – I See You
- [2004.04.21] Source – Steppin' Rally (track 3: Feel Like That, feat. Hinouchi Emi)
- [2004.06.23] Black Bottom Brass Band – ワッショイ☆スター (track 7: Can't stop lovin' you)
- [2004.12.15] Heartsdales – fantasy
- [2005.02.02] Soul'd Out – To All Tha Dreamers (track 4)
- [2006.01.25] Heartsdales – 冬 gonna love ♥ (track 1,2)
- [2006.02.22] Heartsdales – Ultra Foxy (track 2, 3, 4, 13)
- [2006.05.17] Fuji Television Soccer Legends 2006
- [2006.05.24] Heartsdales – Stay (track 1, 2)
- [2006.08.23] Enbull – Time For... (track 2: Gone... feat. 日之内絵美)
- [2006.09.24] V.A. – ビューティ・スタイル (track 2: Get up!)
- [2007.01.23] Epik High – Flow (first song in "The Heart" part of 'Remapping the Human Soul')
- [2007.03.28] M-Flo – Cosmicolor (track 2, 3, 4, 7, 12, 16)
- [2009.02.25] Ami Suzuki – Reincarnation (track 1: Reincarnation)
- [2009.02.25] Sowelu – Material World

=== Others ===
- [2003.09.25] Dress Up ~avex Cover Songs collection~ (track 11: Rock With You Live Version)
