= Neven (album) =

Studio album by M-Flo
- Released: March 13, 2013
- Recorded: 2011–2013
- Genres: Electro house; electropop
- Length: 60:04
- Languages: Japanese; English
- Label: Rhythm Zone
- Producer: M-Flo

M-Flo chronology
M-Flo DJ Mix: Bon! Enkai (2012)	Neven (2013)	M-Flo Inside: Works Best V (2013)

Singles from Neven
- 1. "Tonite" Released: December 5, 2012; 2. "Lover" Released: February 6, 2013

Neven (stylised as NEVEN) is Japanese dance and hip-hop group M-Flo's seventh original studio album, released on March 13, 2013, one year after their revival album, Square One. It is their second album to not publicly announce the featured vocalists on the CD.

== Background ==
On December 19, 2012, M-Flo released a mix album, M-Flo DJ Mix: Bon! Enkai, featuring the set they would perform on December 21, 2012, at their second annual Bonenkai DJ event at Tokyo club Ageha. The mix album featured two new songs, "Tonite," which was performed with Minmi at the event, and "Transformerz (Version 2.0)," a clip of the rearranged version of the Transformers: Prime theme song.

Taku Takahashi became the musical director for the TV drama The Case Files of Biblia Bookstore, which starred Ayame Goriki and Akira. Takahashi wrote the opening theme "Biblorelo" and the main theme "Searching," as well as being the musical supervisor.

In February 2013, Verbal released Featuring-ryoku: anata no kachi wo saidaika suru kiseki no shigotojutsu (フィーチャリング力 あなたの価値を最大化する奇跡の仕事術; "The Power of Featuring: Maximize Your Gains with a Miracle Way to Work"), a business advice book and his first work as an author.

Cream, a band formed of M-Flo collaborators Minami (who began working with Verbal on BoA's "Bump Bump!" (2009) and worked on Square One) and Staxx T (who worked with Teriyaki Boyz) released their debut album Dreamin' on February 27, 2013, which reached #30 on Oricon album charts.

In March 2013, Taku Takahashi released an EDM mix album called EDM WORLD Presented by ☆Taku Takahashi, as well as a Girls' Generation non-stop mix album called Best Selection Non-Stop Mix.

== Promotion ==
The song "Transformerz" was used as the theme song for the second series of Transformers: Prime in Japan, beginning from July 7, 2012. The first single from the album, "Tonite," was released digitally on December 5, 2012, and was featured on the mix album M-Flo DJ Mix: Bon! Enkai.

The song "Chance" was used as the theme song for the drama Return, which was the first drama released for download on UULA, a paid subscription smart phone entertainment application for SoftBank cellphones that began in February 2013. A music video for the song was also released on UULA in March 2013. The video was directed by drama director Masato Harada.

The leading track from the album, "Lover," was released in February 2013, and was their first physically released single since "Love Song" in 2005. The song featured a music video, which was the first to feature the members of M-Flo prominently since 2008's "Love Comes and Goes." It reached number 15 on the Billboard Japan Hot 100. When the song was initially released to iTunes, the vocalist was accidentally labelled on the song, as M-Flo + Miliyah, despite M-Flo's wishes for the vocalist's name not to be published.

M-Flo will hold M-Flo Tour 2013 "Neven" in June and July 2013, a four date Japan tour at Osaka, Nagoya, Fukuoka and Tokyo.

== Conception and writing ==
"Tonite" (2012)
"Tonite," written with Minmi, was the first song released from the album..

"Lover" (2013)
The leading track, "Lover" was a ballad collaborating with Miliyah Kato.

Neven was produced a year after M-Flo's previous album, Square One, compared to the five years between Square One and Cosmicolor. In an interview with Vanity Mix, Verbal said that the album took less time because they had already worked out what styles and ideas they had wanted to work with in Square One. Starting on Neven came naturally, and they already had some idea of what they wanted to try next. "Butterfly" and "Chance" were songs written in sessions for Square One, but were re-arranged and included in Neven. "Butterfly" was performed at M-Flo's M-Flo Tour 2012 'Square One' tour in 2012, and a live performance is featured on Neven's DVD.

Taku Takahashi announced on his Twitter that the album was completed on February 4, 2013.

Verbal also felt that he worked together more with Taku Takahashi on the album than on Square One, and that many aspects of Square One showed off each members' solo career more. He also thought that the album had a stronger house feel, instead of Square One's mix of genres, such as drum and bass and hip-hop.

The album's title, Neven, is a portmanteau of "neverland" and "seven" (it being the group's 7th studio album). M-Flo also chose Neven due to the word being a symmetric palindrome, and felt that it was a symbol of cycles. The album features four entirely English tracks: "Yeah!" "No Way," "Das Dance (Like That)" and "Fnky Algorthm," as well as the mostly English track "Butterfly."

The album features six vocalists collaborating with M-Flo, who are not officially announced on the CD, much like on their previous album, Square One. Two collaborators from Square One return: Minami, vocalist of the band Cream, worked on four songs: "Butterfly," "Fnky Algorthm," "One in a Million" and "Yeah!" Matt Cab, who worked on the song "Yesterday," also made an appearance on Neven, on the song "Das Dance (Like That)."

The album also features two songs by musicians who worked with M-Flo during their loves... era (2003—2009): Minmi, who was on "Lotta Love" from M-Flo Inside: Works Best II (2006), performs "Tonite," and Miliyah Kato, who was featured on the album track "One Day" from Beat Space Nine (2005), performed the leading single "Lover."

Two new musicians feature on Neven. Singer Unico, who entered the Avex club music talent audition Starz Audition 2008, worked on the song "Journey X." Model Kiko Mizuhara is a featured rapper on the song "No Way," in her musician debut. Mizuhara worked together with Verbal as a Reebok ambassador. After going to karaoke together, Verbal offered to work with Mizuhara.

"Chance" is sung by Taku Takahashi, the first time he has done so since "Love Long and Prosper" in 2007. Originally, another person was meant to sing the vocals on the track, but due to scheduling issues, they used the demo vocals as-is. Verbal said that the hardest part of creating the album was scheduling vocalists to come to their personal studio.

== Track listing ==
No.	Title	Writer(s)	Length
1.	"#canuhearthestars?"	M-Flo	1:27
2.	"Yeah!"	M-Flo, Minami	5:47
3.	"Tonite"	M-Flo, Minmi	6:04
4.	"#395days"	M-Flo	0:46
5.	"No Way"	M-Flo	3:21
6.	"Das Dance (Like That)"	M-Flo, Matt Cab	4:07
7.	"Butterfly"	M-Flo, Minami	4:12
8.	"#backinbusiness"	M-Flo	0:43
9.	"Chance"	M-Flo	5:02
10.	"One in a Million"	M-Flo, Minami	6:12
11.	"Lover"	M-Flo, Miliyah Kato	5:21
12.	"#anotherreality"	M-Flo	1:21
13.	"Fnky Algorthm"	M-Flo, Minami	4:32
14.	"#neven"	M-Flo	1:09
15.	"Journey X"	M-Flo, Unico	5:36
16.	"Transformerz"	M-Flo	3:43
17.	"#back2square1"	M-Flo	0:32
Total length:			60:04

DVD
No.	Title	Director	Length
1.	"Lover (Music Video)"	Paul Rojanathara, David Johnson
2.	"Live at "Reebok Classic presents M-Flo Tour 2012 Square One" (TCY Snippet Edit)"	Toshitsugu O-no

== Personnel ==
Personnel details were sourced from Neven's liner notes booklet.

Managerial

- Ryuhei Chiba – executive supervision
- Koichi Fukugawa – artist management for Artimage
- Shinji Hayashi – executive supervision
- Emi Iwamoto – assistant desk for management for Ambush
- Daichi Kagawa – interlude management
- Masato "Max" Matsuura – executive production for Avex Group
- Kensuke Ozaku – artist management for Ambush, Artimage
- Yoshihiro Seki – general producer for Avex Entertainment, inc.
- Ichiro Shimizu – production management and recording director
- Taku Takahashi – executive producer, production
- Shigeru Takeuchi – executive supervision
- Verbal (Young-Kee Yu) – direction, executive producer for Ambush, general concept, production

Performance credits

- Masako Ikeda – interlude voice acting, "Neven Goddess" (track 1, 14)
- Daisuke Muroya – viola, violin (track 1)
- Kaori Nazuka – interlude voice acting, "Brink Investigator A B" (track 12, 17)
- Atsuki Tani – interlude voice acting, "Frame Investigator" (track 4, 8, 14)

Visuals and imagery

- Hiroshi Manaka – photography
- Yoshirotten Nishi – Art direction, styling
- Go Takakusagi – hair, make-up
- Yuuki Watanabe – CG
- Yoon – Creative direction, styling

Technical and production

- Seiya Haga – sound editing (track 1, 4, 8, 12)
- Takeshi Hara – recording engineer (track 11)
- Mitsunori Ikeda – mixing and programming engineer (track 2-3, 5-7, 9-11, 13, 15-16), recording engineer (track 7, 9, 16)
- Osamu "Shu" Imamoto – recording engineer (track 16)
- Miliyah Kato – chorus arrangement (track 11)
- Yasuji Maeda – mastering
- Ryosuke Nakanishi – sound editing (track 4, 8, 12), soundtrack and programming engineer (track 1, 14, 17)
- Dai Satō – Neven interludes author
- Seiji Sekine – mixing and recording engineer (track 1, 4, 8, 12, 14, 17)
- Taku Takahashi – programming engineer (track 2-13, 15-16), soundtrack (track 4, 8, 12)
- Shinsaku Takane – recording engineer (track 3)
- Muga Takeda – Neven interludes co-author
- Lucas Valentine – recording engineer (track 2-3, 5-6, 9-11, 13, 15)

== Charts and sales ==
=== Daily and weekly charts ===
Charts (2013)	Peak position
Japanese Daily Albums (Oricon)	11
Japanese Weekly Albums (Oricon)	19

=== Sales ===
Chart	Amount
Oricon physical sales	12,380

== Release history ==
Region	Date	Format	Distributing Label
Japan	March 13, 2013	CD, CD+DVD, digital download	Rhythm Zone
Taiwan	March 29, 2013	CD	Avex Taiwan
Japan	March 30, 2013	Rental CD	Rhythm Zone
Hong Kong	April 3, 2013	CD	Avex Asia
