= Let Go (M-Flo song) =

Single by M-Flo loves Yoshika

from the album Beat Space Nine
- Language: Japanese
- B-side: "The Other Side of Love"
- Released: November 17, 2004
- Recorded: 2004
- Genre: J-pop
- Length: 5:54
- Label: Rhythm Zone
- Songwriter(s): Taku, Yoshika, Yu Young Lee
- Producer(s): M-Flo

M-Flo singles chronology
"The Love Bug" (2004)	"Let Go" (2004)	"Dopamine" (2005)

Music video
- "Let Go" on YouTube

"Let Go" is a song recorded and produced by Japanese hip-hop trio M-Flo, featuring Yoshika. It was released as the first single for the group's fourth studio album Beat Space Nine (2005) through Rhythm Zone on November 17, 2004. The release contains a B-side track titled "The Other Side of Love", as well as instrumental versions of both songs.

Despite peaking at only number 12 on the Oricon Singles Chart upon its release, "Let Go" was certified multiple times by the Recording Industry Association of Japan (RIAJ) in various categories. including triple platinum for full-length ringtone downloads (chaku-uta full) and double platinum for digital downloads. The single has sold over 124,000 physical copies since its release.

== Other usage ==
On January 22, 2014, Japanese girl group Flower released a sequel version of the song titled "Let Go Again" as part of their self-titled debut album, featuring vocals from Verbal.

== Track listing ==
CD single

1. "Let Go" — 5:57
2. "The Other Side of Love" — 5:31
3. "Let Go" (Instrumental) — 5:56
4. "The Other Side of Love" (Instrumental) — 5:31

== Charts ==
Weekly charts
Chart (2004)	Peak position
Japan Singles Chart (Oricon)	12

== Sales and certifications ==
Sales and certifications for "Let Go"
Region	Certification	Certified units/sales
Japan (RIAJ) Physical single	Gold	124,000
Japan (RIAJ) Digital single	2× Platinum	500,000^{*}
Japan (RIAJ) Chaku-Uta	Platinum	250,000^{*}
Japan (RIAJ) Chaku-Uta Full	3× Platinum	750,000^{*}
^{*} Sales figures based on certification alone.
