= Ryōhei =

- Gender: Male

Origin
- Origin: Japanese
- Meaning: Different meanings depending on the kanji used

Ryōhei, Ryohei, Ryouhei or Ryohhei (written: 良平, 領平, 涼平, 陵平, 亮平, 凌平, 凌兵, 量平, 遼平 or 了平) is a masculine Japanese given name. Notable people with the name include:

- Ryohei Arai (director) (荒井 良平; 1901–1980), Japanese film director
- Ryohei Arai (footballer) (新井 涼平; born 1990), Japanese footballer
- Ryohei Chiba (千葉 涼平; born 1984), Japanese singer
- Ryohei Endo (遠藤 良平; born 1976), Japanese baseball player
- Ryohei Fujiwara (藤原 良平; born 1986), Japanese baseball player
- Ryohei Haga (羽賀 亮平; born 1988), Japanese speed skater
- Ryohei Hayashi (林 陵平; born 1986), Japanese footballer
- Ryōhei Hirose (廣瀬 量平; 1930–2008), Japanese composer
- Ryōhei Katō (加藤 凌平; born 1993), Japanese gymnast
- Ryōhei Kimura (木村 良平; born 1984), Japanese voice actor
- Ryohei Koba (木場 良平; born 1962), Japanese sport shooter
- Ryōhei Koiso (小磯 良平; 1903–1988), Japanese artist
- Ryohei Odai (小田井 涼平; born 1971), Japanese voice actor
- Ryohei Otani (大谷 慶彦; born 1980), Japanese actor and model
- Ryōhei Ōwa (大和 良平; 1909–1981), Japanese photographer
- Ryōhei Shirasaki (白崎 凌兵; born 1993), Japanese footballer
- Ryohei Suzuki (鈴木 亮平; born 1983), Japanese actor
- Ryohei Suzuki (footballer) (鈴木 良平; born 1949), Japanese footballer and manager
- Ryohei Ron Tsutsui (born 1977), Japanese film producer
- Ryōhei Uchida (内田 良平; 1873–1937), Japanese political theorist
- Ryohei Yamamoto (山本 領平; born 1974), Japanese singer
- Ryohei Yamazaki (山崎 亮平; born 1989), Japanese footballer
- Ryohei Yoshihama (吉濱 遼平; born 1992), Japanese footballer
- Ryōhei Mori (森 良平, born November 1973), Japanese scientist and entrepreneur

== Fictional characters ==
- Ryohei Sasagawa (笹川 了平), a character in the manga series Katekyo Hitman Reborn!
- Ryouhei Inuzuka (犬塚 涼平), a character in the manga series Gender-Swap at the Delinquent Academy
