= Beat Space Nine =

Studio album by M-Flo
- Released: August 24, 2005
- Genre: J-Urban
- Length: 1:16:17
- Label: Rhythm Zone
- Producer: M-Flo

M-Flo chronology
Astromantic Charm School (2004)	Beat Space Nine (2005)	Dope Space Nine (2005)

Singles from Beat Space Nine
- 1. "Let Go" Released: November 17, 2004; 2. "Dopamine" Released: February 23, 2005; 3. "Loop in My Heart / Hey!" Released: July 13, 2005

Beat Space Nine is the fourth studio album released by the Japanese group M-Flo. The record is presented in the metaformat of a spaceliner's in-flight entertainment system, specifically that of "Global Astroliner", constituting a recurring theme in the group's albums. Similarly to their previous works, the majority of the tracks contain guest features—including that of Bennie K, Yoshika, and Emyli.

A commercial success in Japan, the album became the group's first, and to-date only, record to peak at number one on the Oricon Albums Chart. By the end of the year, the album sold over 334,000 copies and was certified platinum by the Recording Industry Association of Japan (RIAJ).

== Overview ==
Stylistically, Beat Space Nine contains a more electronic-oriented sound as compared to the group's previous works, particularly contrasting with their previous jazz-oriented album Astromantic (2004). Vocalist Lisa, who was previously a member of M-Flo, appears on the second to last track of this album, "Tripod Baby". The final track, "Nine", is the same as the first track of M-Flo's first album, Planet Shining. Remixes of the songs from this album were released as part of Dope Space Nine, which was made available on November 14, 2005.

== Reception ==
Beat Space Nine experienced commercial success in Japan. The album peaked at number one on the Oricon Albums Chart and charted for 26 weeks; as of February 2026, it is M-Flo's only album to have reached number one on the chart. Within a week of its release, it was certified platinum by the Recording Industry Association of Japan (RIAJ) for having surpassed physical sales of 250,000 units, becoming their third record to receive the certification. By the end of the year, it sold more than 334,000 units in the country, and ranked at number 42 on the year-end Oricon album chart (Astromantic also ranked at #42 in 2004). In Taiwan, Beat Space Nine peaked at number eight on the G-Music J-pop Albums chart.

== Track listing ==
1. "Beat"
2. "Taste Your Stuff" [M-Flo Loves Bennie K]
3. "Loop in My Heart" [M-Flo Loves Emyli & Yoshika]
4. "So Exclusive" [M-Flo Loves Sowelu]
5. "I'm Da 1" [M-Flo Loves Whee Sung]
6. "One Day" [M-Flo Loves Miliyah Kato]
7. "A.D.D.P." [M-Flo Loves Monday Michiru]
8. "To Your Beat" [M-Flo Loves Yoshika]
9. "Space"
10. "Dopeman" [M-Flo Loves Emyli & Diggy Mo']
11. "Cozmo-Naughty" [M-Flo Loves Kahimi Karie]
12. "The Other Side of Love" [M-Flo Loves Emyli]
13. "Float'n Flow" [M-Flo Loves Rie Fu]
14. "Hey!" [M-Flo Loves Akiko Wada]
15. "Let Go" [M-Flo Loves Yoshika]
16. "Tripod Baby" [M-Flo Loves Lisa]
17. "Nine"

== Song appearances ==
A different version of the M-Flo loves Bennie K track "Taste Your Stuff", entitled "Happy Drive: Taste Your Stuff", was released on Bennie K's single "Sky" and their album Japana-rhythm.

The track "Tripod Baby" was remixed as a promotional song for the Shadow the Hedgehog video game released in November 2005.

A remix of "One Day" featuring Miliyah Kato was released on her album, Rose.

== Charts and certifications ==
=== Charts ===
Chart (2005)	Peak position
Japanese Daily Albums (Oricon)	1
Japanese Weekly Albums (Oricon)	1
Japanese Yearly Albums (Oricon)	42
Taiwanese J-pop Albums (G-Music)	8

=== Sales and certifications ===
Region	Certification	Certified units/sales
Japan (RIAJ)	Platinum	350,000

== Release history ==
Region	Date	Format	Catalog number	Label	Ref.
Japan	August 24, 2005	CD, digital download	RZCD-45119	Rhythm Zone	"
