= Come Again (M-Flo song) =

Single by M-Flo

from the album Expo Expo
- Released: January 17, 2001
- Recorded: 2000
- Genre: J-Urban; R&B
- Length: 5:54
- Label: Rhythm Zone
- Producer: M-Flo

M-Flo singles chronology
"How You Like Me Now?" (2000)	"Come Again" (2001)	"Orbit-3" (2001)

Music video
- "Come Again" on YouTube

"Come Again" is a song recorded by Japanese hip-hop trio m-flo for their second studio album Expo Expo (2001). It was released as their 9th physical single through Rhythm Zone on January 17, 2001. Serving as the second single for the album following "How You Like Me Now?", the release contains two additional remix tracks as well as its instrumental version.

"Come Again" experienced commercial success in Japan upon its release, where it peaked at number four on the Oricon Singles Chart and sold nearly 390,000 copies by the end of the year. It was certified twice in platinum by the Recording Industry Association of Japan (RIAJ) in both digital sales and physical shipments. In 2012, "Come Again" attained a new Billboard Japan Hot 100 peak of number 61.

== Track listing ==
CD single

1. "Come Again" — 5:54
2. "Come Again (Yukihiro Fukutomi remix)" — 8:00
3. "Come Again (Jark Prongo remix)" — 7:44
4. "Come Again (Instrumental)" — 5:53

== Charts ==
=== Weekly charts ===
Chart (2001, 2012)	Peak position
Japan Singles (Oricon)	4
Japan (Japan Hot 100)	61

=== Yearly charts ===
Chart (2001)	Position
Japan Singles (Oricon)	46

== Sales and certifications ==
Region	Certification	Certified units/sales
Japan (RIAJ) Physical single	Platinum	389,760
Japan (RIAJ) Digital single	Platinum	250,000^{*}
Streaming
Japan (RIAJ)	Platinum	100,000,000^{†}
^{*} Sales figures based on certification alone.^{†} Streaming-only figures based on certification alone.

== Release history ==
Region	Date	Format(s)	Label(s)
Japan	January 17, 2001	CD single	Rhythm Zone
Japan	February 20, 2001	12-inch vinyl	Labsoul Records
