= Sowelu =

- Born: Aki Harada; November 6, 1982 (age 43); Tokyo, Japan
- Genres: Pop; R&B
- Years active: 2002–present
- Labels: Defstar Records; Rhythm Zone
- Website: rhythmzone.net/sowelu/

Aki Harada (原田 亜希, Harada Aki; born November 6, 1982) better known by her stage name, Sowelu, is a Japanese pop/R&B singer signed onto Avex Group's label Rhythm Zone.

== History ==
Her career started in 2002 with the release of her first single Beautiful Dreamer, a soft love ballad which did very well in the charts, and was later featured on the Relaxin’ with Japanese Lovers compilation album. Her first single was modestly successful, and it wasn't until the release of her album Geofu in the summer of 2003 that she gained recognition. Geofu did exceptionally well in the charts, scoring a number 4 position with more than 300,000 copies sold. Her first single after Geofu, "Rainbow" was used as the theme song for the Japanese drama Netsuretsuteki Chukahanten, and the other A-side song on that single, "breath ~Omoi no Youryō~" was used for the national promotion campaign of JFN Radio. She performs under Sony Music Japan's DefSTAR Records label.

Her next big single "Glisten" was used in a make-up commercial for Menards products and did fairly well in the Japanese market. With this success, she gained even more popularity, and was asked to sing the end theme for the popular TBS animated series Fullmetal Alchemist, entitled "I Will", giving her an easy in with American fans. Because of "'I Will"', the two other songs included with her "I Will" single, "Candy Rain" and "Pearl Color ni Yurete", became popular among American fans. In 2005, her song "Candy Rain" was featured on the Soul Tree: a Musical Tribute to Toshinobu Kubota album and "Pearlcolor ni Yurete" was on the Momoe Yamaguchi tribute album Thank You For.... Her third single "Fortune" was selected for the American J-Pop compilation album Neo Soul, and "Across My Heart" written by Kenny Lerum and Barry J. Eastmond, from the Geofu album, was added to the "Smooth Listening Compilation" album.

In November 2004, Sowelu released her 8th single, "Last Forever", which became the TV insert song for the new drama There goes Nurse-man, and her cover of "The Rose" was featured on a Nescafe commercial. Then, after one and a half years of waiting, Sowelu released her second album Sweet Bridge on January 7, 2005.

In 2005, Sowelu contributed to M-Flo's album Beat Space Nine on the track "So Exclusive", and again on their album Dope Space Nine in the same song, remixed by Korean fusion band, Clazziquai.

The Japanese version of The Pursuit of Happyness uses "Shiawase no Chikara" as its theme song.

In the music video for the song "to YOU" several photographs of her family and her childhood are intercut with scenes of her singing in a wide room with large glass windows. According to her website, the video location is a church about one hour away from Tokyo by car. At the end of the PV, the family members in the photos make an appearance together with Sowelu, including her grandmother, her mother and even Sowelu's pet chihuahua.

Her 4th album "24 -twenty four-" was released on July 12, 2006. It debuted at #3, her highest ranking yet. The album remained at the #3 spot for two weeks on the Weekly Oricon Album Charts. One of the album's songs entitled "守るべきもの", (Mamoru Beki Mono/The One You Should Protect) is used as the ending of the 9th Pokémon movie Pokémon Ranger and the Prince of the Sea: Manaphy.

On December 12, 2007, Sowelu released the single "光", (Hikari). The single reached #28 on the Oricon Weekly Charts. Sowelu would participate in the 2008 Nike ad campaign, "MY MUSIC, MY FORCE"; along with Perfume, Home Made Kazoku, Tohoshinki, Shota Moriyama and Shoko Nakagawa.

In Spring 2009, Sowelu's contract with Sony Music Japan's DefSTAR label wasn't renewed, resulting in the label dropping her from the website's roster. Less than a week after the news of Sowelu being dropped from her label, it was announced that Sowelu had signed to Avex Trax, one of Japan's most powerful record labels (under its sister label Rhythm Zone).

On May 30, 2012, Sowelu released her 5th studio album, "29 tonight".

== Personal life ==
She was born in Tokyo to a half Irish and half Japanese mother and Japanese father Yoshitaka Shimada (嶋田 吉隆, Shimada Yoshitaka).

Sowelu is a martial arts fan and has stated that she is only attracted to fighting men (as for show-business men), such as mixed martial artists and professional wrestlers, especially those who look like Mark Hunt or Kazuyuki Fujita.

== Discography ==
=== Studio albums ===
- 2003: Geofu
- 2005: Sweet Bridge
- 2008: 24 (Twenty Four)
- 2008: Naked
- 2010: Love & I (Ren'ai Henreki)
- 2012: 29 tonight

=== Extended plays ===
- 2011: Let Me...

=== Compilation albums ===
- 2005: Heads or Tails?
- 2009: Sowelu the Best 2002–2009

=== Top 20 singles ===
- 2002: "Beautiful Dreamer"
- 2003: "Glisten"
- 2004: "I Will"
- 2005: "Get Over"
- 2006: "To You"
- 2006: "Dear Friend"
- 2007: "Shiawase no Chikara"
- 2007: "24 Karats (Type S)" with Exile, Doberman Inc
