= Me... =

ME...

Studio album by Emi Hinouchi
- Released: December 3, 2008
- Genre: J-Urban, J-pop

Emi Hinouchi chronology
Dramatiques (2003)	ME... (2008)	Voice (2011)

Singles from ME...
- 1. "O'kay" Released: May 16, 2007; 2. "GOODIE MEMORIES" Released: September 5, 2007; 3. "愛だけが" Released: April 9, 2008; 4. "片思い" Released: November 5, 2008

ME... is the second studio album released by the J-Urban artist Emi Hinouchi. It was released on December 3, 2008. It reached the 64th place on the Oricon Weekly Albums Chart.

== Track listing ==
1. O'kay
2. Music of Love / 日之内エミ x SOFFet
3. 片想い
4. 恋はリルラリ
5. chocolate
6. 夏恋 / 日之内エミ & Ryohei
7. GOODIE MEMORIES
8. Get up!
9. ファーストデート
10. I Love You
11. Heart feel vacances
12. 愛だけが
13. interlude ～in my dream～
14. Grow
15. E・S・C・A・P・E
16. TWINKLE STAR (SHINE ON ME ver.) / MAKAI
