= The Intergalactic Collection =

The Intergalactic Collection ~ギャラコレ~

Studio album by M-Flo
- Released: March 5, 2003
- Genre: J-Urban

The Intergalactic Collection ~ギャラコレ~ was a greatest-hits album released on March 5, 2003 by the Japanese hip-hop group, M-Flo, continuing the group's recurring sci-fi theme and containing singles from 2000's Planet Shining and 2001's Expo Expo.

== Track listing ==
1. The Intergalactic Collection
2. How You Like Me Now?
3. Mirrorball Satellite 2012
4. Quantum Leap [DJ Watarai Remix]
5. The Cat Walk
6. Flo Jack
7. Chronopsychology
8. Hands
9. Come Back to Me
10. The PR
11. Prism
12. Been So Long
13. The Intermission
14. Orbit 3
15. L.O.T.(Love or Truth)
16. One Sugar Dream
17. Come Again
18. The New Vocal
19. Come Again… and Again!
20. The Way We Were (feat. Ceybil Jefferies)
21. The Rhyme Brokers
22. Incognito
