= Good Times (Bagdad Cafe the Trench Town album) =

Studio album by Bagdad Cafe the Trench Town
- Released: August 9, 2006
- Recorded: Toshiaki "COBRA" Kitahata (北畑 "COBRA" 俊明) (Alchemy Studio)
- Genre: Reggae
- Length: 48:42
- Label: Victor Entertainment
- Producer: Bagdad Cafe the Trench Town

Bagdad Cafe the Trench Town chronology
Movin' On (2005)	Good Times (2006)	Satisfaction (2007)

Good Times is the fourth full-length album by Bagdad Cafe the Trench Town. It was released in August 2006. It is their second album to be released under Victor Entertainment. Good Times appeared in the Oricon album chart for 4 weeks after its release and its highest position was #75 making it the highest ranking Bagdad Cafe the Trench Town album.

== Track listing ==
No.	Title	Lyrics	Music	Length
1.	"Sunshine"	Mai	Muramoto	4:49
2.	"I do love you baby"	Mai	Iwai Longseller	4:27
3.	"Night session"	Mai	Raita	4:04
4.	"Hold you tight"	Mai	Umeken	3:54
5.	"Can't stop this love"	Mai	Muramoto	3:54
6.	"Shake it!"	Mai	Umeken	3:48
7.	"Ameiro (雨色, Rain Colour)"	Mai, Banchō	Banchō	5:16
8.	"I'm turning my back now!"	Mai	Muramoto	4:03
9.	"Sweet memory"	Mai	Raita	5:15
10.	"Love is all"	Mai	Raita	4:08
11.	"Welcome home～おかえり～"	Mai, Banchō	Michael Punch	5:04

== Personnel ==
- Mai - vocals
- Raita - EG
- Mura - EG/AG Junichi Martin
- Yama - bass
- Banchō (番長) - drums
- Michael Punch (マイケル☆パンチ) - Ep/clavinova/piano
- Big Mom - chorus
- Ran - chorus
- Iwai Longseller (岩井ロングセラー) - organ/moog the SOURCE/minimoog
- Ogi - tenor saxophone
- Umeken - trombone
