= The Love Bug (song) =

Single by M-Flo loves BoA

from the album Astromantic
- Released: March 17, 2004
- Recorded: 2004
- Genre: Hip-hop; R&B
- Length: 4:01
- Label: Rhythm Zone
- Songwriters: Verbal and Taku Takahashi
- Producer: M-Flo

M-Flo singles chronology
"Miss You" (2003)	"The Love Bug" (2004)	"Let Go" (2004)

BoA singles chronology
"Be the One" (2004)	"The Love Bug" (2004)	"Quincy / Kono Yo no Shirushi" (2004)

Music video
- "The Love Bug" on YouTube

"The Love Bug", stylised as "the Love Bug", is a song recorded by Japanese hip-hop duo M-Flo for their third studio album, Astromantic (2004). It was written, arranged, and produced by Verbal and Taku Takahashi who compose the duo and features South Korean singer BoA as the accompanying vocalist. It was released on March 17, 2004, and was distributed by Rhythm Zone in two physical formats: a standard CD single and a limited edition vinyl. In its bass line, the song samples "Give Me Your Love" (1981) by American jazz vocalist Sylvia Striplin. Following its release, "The Love Bug" peaked at number eight on the Oricon Singles Chart and sold over 56,000 copies.

== Overview ==
"The Love Bug" was released by Avex Group record label Rhythm Zone on March 17, 2004, as the third lead single for M-Flo's third studio album Astromantic (2004). It consists of one of the many songs released as a collaboration with various singers as part of the group's "M-Flo Loves" series, which commenced the year prior following the departure of vocalist Lisa from M-Flo. The standard single contains the remix "The Love Bug (Big Bug NYC Remix)" as well as a cover by reggae band Bagdad Cafe the Trench Town. Musically, "The Love Bug" is a R&B and hip hop number that is composed in the key of C-sharp major with a tempo of 117 beats per minute. In 2014, the track was remixed by Yasutaka Nakata of electronic band Capsule for M-Flo's 2014 remix album EDM-Flo.

== Live performances ==
M-Flo and BoA performed "The Love Bug" at the 2004 Mnet Km Music Video Festival in Seoul on December 4, where the group won the award for Best Asian Hip Hop Artist. On July 21, 2007, BoA made a surprise appearance at the final show of M-Flo's Cosmicolor Tour at the Yokohama Arena, where she performed "The Love Bug" on stage with Verbal.

== Track listing ==
CD single

1. "The Love Bug" — 4:01
2. "The Love Bug (Big Bug NYC Remix)" — 3:40
3. "The Love Bug (covered by Bagdad Cafe the Trench Town)" — 5:03

Vinyl tracklist

1. "The Love Bug" — 4:01
2. "The Love Bug (Big Bug NYC Remix)" — 3:40
3. "The Love Bug (covered by Bagdad Cafe the Trench Town)" — 5:03
4. "The Love Bug (Instrumental)" — 4:01

== Charts ==
Chart (2004)	Peak position
Japanese Singles Chart (Oricon)	8

== Release history ==
Region	Date	Format(s)	Label(s)
Japan	March 17, 2004	CD single, digital download	Rhythm Zone
Japan	March 17, 2004	12-inch vinyl	Labsoul Records
