= Keep Your Hands Off Eizouken! =

Japanese manga series and its adaptations

- First tankōbon volume cover, featuring Sayaka Kanamori (left), Tsubame Mizusaki (right), and Midori Asakusa (center)

映像研には手を出すな！ (Eizōken ni wa Te o Dasu na!)
- Genre: Comedy; Slice of life
- Manga
- Written by: Sumito Ōwara
- Published by: Shogakukan
- English publisher: NA: Dark Horse Comics
- Imprint: Big Comics
- Magazine: Monthly Big Comic Spirits
- Original run: July 27, 2016 – present
- Volumes: 10
- Anime television series
- Directed by: Masaaki Yuasa
- Produced by: Shinya Tsuruoka; Jun Sakata; Eunyoung Choi; Junya Okamoto
- Written by: Masaaki Yuasa (series composition); Yūichirō Kido (screenplay)
- Music by: Oorutaichi
- Studio: Science Saru
- Licensed by: Crunchyroll: NA: Sentai Filmworks (home video); SA/SEA: Medialink
- Original network: NHK General TV
- Original run: January 6, 2020 – March 23, 2020
- Episodes: 12
- Television drama
- Directed by: Tsutomu Hanabusa
- Produced by: Akito Takahashi; Hiroo Maruyama
- Written by: Tsutomu Hanabusa; Mizuto Takano
- Music by: Nozomu Satō
- Studio: Robot Communications
- Original network: TBS, MBS, CBC, BS-TBS
- Original run: April 6, 2020 – May 11, 2020
- Episodes: 6
- Live-action film
- Directed by: Tsutomu Hanabusa
- Produced by: Akito Takahashi; Hiroo Maruyama
- Written by: Tsutomu Hanabusa; Mizuto Takano
- Music by: Nozomu Satō
- Studio: Robot Communications; North River
- Released: September 25, 2020
- icon

Keep Your Hands Off Eizouken! (Japanese: 映像研には手を出すな！, Hepburn: Eizōken ni wa Te o Dasu na! (Note: "Eizōken" means "motion picture studies" or "video research" in Japanese.)) is a Japanese manga series written and illustrated by Sumito Ōwara. It has been serialized in Shogakukan's seinen manga magazine Monthly Big Comic Spirits since 2016 and has been collected in ten tankōbon volumes as of January 2026.

An anime television series adaptation produced by Science Saru aired from January to March 2020. A live-action television series was broadcast from April to May 2020. A live-action film adaptation premiered in September 2020.

== Plot ==
First-year high schooler Midori Asakusa loves anime so much, she insists that "concept is everything" in animation. While she spends her time doodling endless ideas and settings in her sketchbook, she has not taken the first step to creating anime, insisting that she cannot do it alone. After Asakusa's money-loving best friend Sayaka Kanamori notices her genius and drive, and when it becomes clear that their classmate and charismatic fashion model Tsubame Mizusaki wants to be an animator, the energetic trio start an animation club. Together, the three aim to realize the "ultimate world" that exists in their minds, and come to see the power that fiction and imagination have on their lives and the world around them.

== Characters ==
=== Eizouken ===
The club is founded to produce the animation Asakusa and the others made. An anime cultural workshop already exists at Shibahama High School, but Kanamori lied and called the new club "A film club" and a teacher approved it. It was created because Mizusaki's parents forbade her from joining the anime club.

Midori Asakusa (浅草みどり, Asakusa Midori)
Voiced by: Sairi Ito (Japanese); Monica Rial (English)
Portrayed by: Asuka Saitō
A fifteen-year-old girl at Shibahama High who likes anime. She is curious and imaginative, but not good at socializing. Her policy is that "anime is all about the setting", and she has kept various designs inspired by her daily life in her sketchbook. Her classmate Sayaka Kanamori used to be the only person who knew about Midori's passion until she met Tsubame Mizusaki at Anime Club, which lead the three of them to start Eizouken. Her goal is to explore her own "greatest world".
Sayaka Kanamori (金森さやか, Kanamori Sayaka)
Voiced by: Mutsumi Tamura (Japanese); Olivia Swasey (English)
Portrayed by: Minami Umezawa
Midori's tall and long-legged classmate. Though she has neither interest in nor knowledge of anime, she took interest in Midori and hangs out with her. She loves money-making activities and thinks of ways to make money even in casual conversations. Since starting up Eizouken, she has been the only realist, and is in charge of the producer role and is in a sense, the club's de facto director since Asakusa, the club's actual director, is too absent-minded for the position. She is also brilliant at negotiating with the school and the student council. While she appreciates Asakusa and Mizusaki's abilities, she is often troubled by the two creative-minded individuals.
Tsubame Mizusaki (水崎ツバメ, Mizusaki Tsubame)
Voiced by: Misato Matsuoka (Japanese); Jessica Boone (English)
Portrayed by: Mizuki Yamashita
Midori's classmate who is a charismatic amateur model and famous in the school. She is expected to be an actress in the future as both of her parents are actors, but she actually wants to be an animator, and is particularly skilled at drawing character movement. As Tsubame has been banned from joining Anime Club by her parents, she joins Eizouken instead and begins to create anime together with Midori and Sayaka. She grew up in a rich family, so her financial sense is much different from the other two girls.
Mr. Fujimoto (藤本先生, Fujimoto-sensei)
Voiced by: Kazuhiko Inoue (Japanese); John Swasey (English)
Portrayed by: Masahiro Takashima
Eizouken's advisor and consultant. He is known for the historical-figure-like mustache. He rarely gives direction to Eizouken and leaves the activities up to the members. He likes to play games in his free time.

=== Audio Club ===
Parker Dōmeki (百目鬼・パーカー, Dōmeki Pākā)
Voiced by: Yumiri Hanamori (Japanese); Kira Vincent-Davis (English)
Portrayed by: Hiyori Sakurada
The only member of Audio Club. She joined the club for the vast numbers of the audio files that are stored there, but ended up giving up a part of its storage to the student council. Approached by Eizouken, she accepted taking the role of the club's audio consultant on the condition that she can use part of their club room for storage.

=== The School Council ===
Tōru Dōtonbori (道頓堀透, Dōtonbori Tōru)
Voiced by: Miyuki Kawashō (Japanese); Donna Bella Litton (English)
Portrayed by: Sakurako Konishi
The school council president.
Sowande Sakaki (さかき・ソワンデ, Sakaki Sowande)
Voiced by: Mikako Komatsu (Japanese); Melanie Ernestina (English)
Portrayed by: Ema Grace
The school council's secretary. She is better at seeing the essence of things compared to the opportunistic president, and is considered an influential person on the council. She seems to care about Eizouken and often promotes their activities.
Kyū Ajima (阿島九, Ajima Kyū)
Voiced by: Hiroko Kiso (Japanese); Elissa Cuellar (English)
Portrayed by: Riko Fukumoto
The school council leader.
Shunya Ō (王俊也, Ō Shunya)
Portrayed by: Ryō Matsuzaki
The school council treasurer. Male student with a shaven head who seems largely gentle.

=== Robot Club ===
Robot Club Ono (ロボ研小野, Robo-ken Ono)
Voiced by: Yūki Ono (Japanese); Labraska Washington (English)
Portrayed by: Mizuki Itagaki
Robot Club Kobayashi (ロボ研小林, Robo-ken Kobayashi)
Voiced by: Yūsuke Kobayashi (Japanese); Nazeeh Tarsha (English)
Portrayed by: Eiji Akaso
Robot Club Gotō (ロボ研後藤, Robo-ken Gotō)
Voiced by: Ryūnosuke Watanuki (Japanese); Andrew Love (English)
Robot Club Seki (ロボ研関, Robo-ken Seki)
Voiced by: Shiori Izawa (Japanese); Alyssa Marek (English)

== Production ==
After completing a fine arts major at the Toyo Institute of Art & Design, Ōwara continued to pursue independent study in drawing and animation. Ōwara gained recognition for his submission Usagogi at the Comitia 111 convention in 2015, which caught the attention of a scout from the editorial team at Monthly Big Comic Spirits. Approximately a year later, the first chapter of Keep Your Hands Off Eizouken! was released in the same magazine on July 27, 2016.

== Media ==
=== Manga ===
Keep Your Hands Off Eizouken! is written and illustrated by Sumito Ōwara. The series started in Shogakukan's Monthly Big Comic Spirits on July 27, 2016. Shogakukan has compiled its chapters into individual tankōbon volumes. The first volume was published on January 12, 2017. As of January 9, 2026, ten tankōbon volumes have been published.

In March 2020, Dark Horse Comics announced the acquisition of the manga for English release which originally would have started on October 6, but was postponed to November 4.

==== Volumes ====
No.	Original release date	Original ISBN	English release date	English ISBN
1	January 12, 2017	978-4-09-189296-6	November 4, 2020	978-1-5067-1897-2
2	September 12, 2017	978-4-09-189636-0	June 9, 2021	978-1-5067-1898-9
3	June 12, 2018	978-4-09-189887-6	January 26, 2022	978-1-5067-1899-6
4	May 10, 2019	978-4-09-860241-4	November 9, 2022	978-1-5067-3149-0
5	January 30, 2020	978-4-09-860531-6	May 10, 2023	978-1-5067-3150-6
6	October 12, 2021	978-4-09-861156-0	March 6, 2024	978-1-5067-3796-6
7	July 12, 2022	978-4-09-861330-4	March 4, 2025	978-1-5067-3797-3
8	July 12, 2023	978-4-09-861739-5	August 18, 2026	978-1-5067-4975-4
9	December 12, 2024	978-4-09-863082-0	—	—
10	January 9, 2026	978-4-09-863671-6	—	—

=== Anime ===
An anime television series adaptation was announced in May 2019. Produced by Shogakukan, Warner Bros. Japan and Science Saru, the series was directed by Masaaki Yuasa, who also handled series composition. Yūichirō Kido wrote the scripts, Naoyuki Asano designed the characters, and Oorutaichi composed the music. The series aired for 12 episodes on NHK General TV from January 6 to March 23, 2020. (Note: NHK General TV listed the air dates for the series on Sunday at 24:10, which is effectively Monday at 0:10 a.m. JST.) Chelmico performed the series' opening theme song "Easy Breezy," while the band Kami-sama, I Have Noticed (神様、僕は気づいてしまった, Kami-sama, Boku wa Kizuite Shimatta) performed the series' ending theme song "A Blue That Has No Name" (名前のない青, Namae no Nai Ao). The popularity of the series led to it being rebroadcast on NHK Educational TV in Japan in October 2021.

It was streamed by Crunchyroll worldwide, excluding Asia. In May 2021, it was announced Sentai Filmworks picked up the home video rights for a Blu-ray release. It contains an English dub and the original version with subtitles. It was released on July 25, 2023. Medialink licensed the series in Asia-Pacific and streamed it on Ani-One Asia YouTube channel.

==== Episodes ====
No.	Title (Note: All English titles are taken from Crunchyroll.)	Directed by	Original release date
1	"The Greatest World!"; Transliteration: "Saikyō no Sekai!" (Japanese: 最強の世界！)	Mari Motohashi; Masaaki Yuasa	January 6, 2020
Midori Asakusa is inspired as a child to become an anime creator. As a freshman in high school, Asakusa drags her friend Sayaka Kanamori to an anime screening on campus. After seeing her classmate and amateur model Tsubame Mizusaki chased by men in black clothes, the two girls help her escape. As the trio regroups in a nearby laundromat, Asakusa discovers that Mizusaki also has a dream of creating anime, though her parents disapprove. The two exchange sketchbooks, with Asakusa showing skill in background and set design while Mizusaki focused on character art. The two then come up with a fantastical scenario after combining their drawings together. The two decide to try working on making an anime together, encouraged by Kanamori who sees the venture as a potential money-maker.
2	"The Eizouken Takes the Stage!"; Transliteration: "Eizōken, Bakutansu!" (Japanese: 映像研、爆誕す！)	Atsuko Tonomizu	January 13, 2020
The trio decide to start a new club to get around Mizusaki's parents, convincing a couple teachers that they plan to create a live-action film club (Eizouken). The girls find themselves in an abandoned, run-down storehouse as their new club room. Mizusaki and Asakusa imagine another fantastical scenario and Asakusa ends up falling off a rusty railing while Kanamori tries to think of how to best budget the club funds. Asakusa tries to convince her teacher to get desks but lets slip she wants to use it for anime, forcing Kanamori to step in and convince the teacher to let them use it anyway. The trio get the key to an old storage room and discover a past school Anime Club left behind drawings, cels, and equipment for creating animation. Asakusa and Mizusaki end up finishing the drawing of the wind turbine outside. The next day, Kanamori discovers that someone bought her footage of Asakusa falling in the club room.
3	"Let's Accomplish Something!"; Transliteration: "Jisseki wo Uchitatero!" (Japanese: 実績を打ち立てろ！)	Yūki Igarashi	January 20, 2020
After earning 30,000 Yen from selling the accident footage, Kanamori ends up spending most of it on tools and supplies to repair the club room. Meanwhile, Mizusaki and Asakusa keep getting distracted by various fauna that wander around their club. When they get stuck on the roof during a hailstorm, Kanamori breaks through a weakened wall to save them, only to discover the girls found another way down. Later, the Eizouken advisor reminds the girls that they will soon have to give a presentation to earn more funding and status for the club. After a lengthy debate, the girls decide to make an animated short film featuring a machete-wielding girl wearing a gas mask fighting a tank to impress their audience.
4	"Hold That Machete Tight!"; Transliteration: "Sono Machetto wo Tsuyoku Nigire!" (Japanese: そのマチェットを強く握れ！)	Fūga Yamashiro	January 27, 2020
With less than a month to finish their project before presenting it to the Student Council, Kanamori tries to cut down the scope of their anime short while Mizusaki wants to hand-draw every frame and Asakusa wants to add a story. After heated arguments and a failed attempt to loop in the school's Art Club on drawing backgrounds, Kanamori convinces the other girls to use flat colors and digital photography and animation cheats to save time. After pulling several all-nighters, Eizouken finally has their short film ready. The Student Council tries to immediately shut down the club after seeing evidence of their vandalism and other antics across the school, until Asakusa demands the Student Council let them present their short film. The short film blows the audience away. Even though Eizouken begins critiquing their own work, the Student Council approves their request for funds.
5	"An Iron Giant Appears!"; Transliteration: "Tetsukyojin Arawaru!" (Japanese: 鉄巨人あらわる！)	Satoshi Ifuku	February 3, 2020
Eizouken is hired by the school's Robot Club to make a short anime with their giant robot fighting a monster. Eizouken begins exploring an abandoned area underneath the school to get ideas for the setting and the monster. After getting some ideas, the trio falls through a weakened floor into a pit, but Asakusa uses her survivalist tools to help them escape. The next day, the Robot Club President loudly complains about Eizouken just as Kanamori enters and takes some photos for blackmail. Asakusa presents her ideas for a story, but the President argues for a contradictory "real-life giant robot" instead of a robot with a chainsaw arm that Asakusa drew. Eventually, the two groups find harmony over their respective near-impossible dreams and begin designing the robot for the anime together.
6	"Let's Do Better Than Last Time!"; Transliteration: "Zensaku yori Shinposuru-beshi!" (Japanese: 前作より進歩するべし！)	Sumito Sasaki; Madoka Ogawa	February 10, 2020
After Eizouken's success with their first anime short, they find themselves with triple the time for their giant robot anime, but also triple the work. Kanamori mentions that the Art Club is now interested in helping them draw backgrounds, and she convinced the IT Club to sell her a computer for cheap instead of having to use the school's computer lab. Later, Kanamori uses the Student Council's impending inspection to coerce the Sound Club's sole member, Doumeki, to use her skills and extensive sound effects library on Eizouken's projects. A few days later, Asakusa and Kanamori meet with the Art Club to explain what they need, but the Art Club's questions and comments prove overwhelming for Asakusa. Asakusa starts questioning her own storyboards that evening and abruptly shows her plan to scrap the giant robot. Kanamori immediately shoots her down, stating that they have too much invested in this project to change everything and that Asakusa needs to stick with a robot. Asakusa keeps the robot but redesigns its interior, as Mizusaki and Kanamori remark that Asakusa's "motivation switch" seems to activate at random.
7	"I Have To Do It For Myself!"; Transliteration: "Watashi wa Watashi wo Sukuunda!" (Japanese: 私は私を救うんだ！)	Oyunam	February 17, 2020
A young Mizusaki becomes inspired to draw movement based on her observations at school and home. Doumeki moves most of her sound inventory into a nearby as Eizouken tries to get a storyboard animated and set up timing for the sounds and the Robot Club's voiceovers. The Art Club returns with their finished backgrounds, but Asakusa and Mizusaki find them riddled with errors and ask them to make some edits. As the Art Club leaves, Kanamori chastises Asakusa for taking on more work herself, and threatening the project's timeline again. The next day, a torrential downpour forces the trio to seek shelter in a nearby bathhouse. After Mizusaki talks about her family, the trio then head to a nearby restaurant and eat some crawfish while Asakusa dreams up another fantasy world. The next day, Mizusaki gets frustrated that the robot's chainsaw isn't animated enough to her liking. Kanamori tells her that adding sound to the existing animation will be good enough, but Mizusaki insists that she wants to animate it perfectly for everyone to see.
8	"The Grand Shibahama Festival!"; Transliteration: "Dai-Shibahama-sai!" (Japanese: 大芝浜祭！)	Seishirō Nagaya	February 24, 2020
With the school festival approaching, the anime is almost done, though Kanamori notes the dialogue will have to be done live as Mizusaki's edits gave them no time to add it in. Meanwhile, Mizusaki receives word that her parents will come to see her at the festival, and decides to make herself the face of the production to draw in an audience. On the day of the festival, the Robot Club helps Mizusaki advertise the anime showing, and Kanamori blackmails the HVAC Club to keep the auditorium cooler than the other buildings to draw more people in. The Student Council tries to shut down Mizusaki and the Robot Club for their excessive display, but the Robot Club helps Mizusaki escape to make it to the show on time. At the screening, Mizusaki's parents approve of her work while Kanamori uses her image to sell DVD preorders. Later, just as Asakusa begins critiquing her own work, the Mizusakis are introduced to the trio.
9	"Aim for Comet A!"; Transliteration: "Kometto A o Mezase!" (Japanese: コメットＡを目指せ！)	Takuya Fujikura; Karin Noguchi	March 2, 2020
Kanamori reveals that Eizouken's recent successes have sparked a flood of requests from other school clubs to make an anime for them, but the DVD sales from their robot anime earned them less than 20,000 Yen in profit, so Kanamori turned them down to focus on another anime that will sell even more DVDs. After a brief stop at an underground ramen shop, Kanamori shows off an abandoned storefront and talks about her past, how her family originally brewed sake, but nearby development forced them to turn the brewery into a convenience store, then the development was abandoned and not enough customers came by the store, forcing her parents to shut it down. Kanamori swears to use every method possible to get more people interested in Eizouken's work, as Asakusa conceptualizes Eizouken's next anime with the town itself defending against an alien invasion. Later, Kanamori successfully convinces the town's business community to give Eizouken funding to make up for the Student Council garnishing royalties from Doumeki's sound clips. Meanwhile, Asakusa suddenly thinks of a way to portray a "realistic" laser cannon, but admits she hasn't decided on a backstory yet.
10	"Against Our Independent World!"; Transliteration: "Dokuji Sekai no Tairitsu!" (Japanese: 独自世界の対立！)	Fūga Yamashiro	March 9, 2020
Kanamori announces her plan to have Mizusaki judge voice-acting auditions for the new anime and gain more publicity when the Student Council appears and drags Eizouken before a panel hearing. The teachers at the hearing tell Eizouken that they can keep making the anime but are not allowed to profit off it using the school's name. Meanwhile, Asakusa struggles to think of a story that would fit her concept art, despite Kanamori's increasing frustrations with this delay in the project. Later, Eizouken goes "sound hunting" with Doumeki, and Asakusa invites herself along to think of more ideas. Sowande, the Student Council Secretary, appears at a nearby riverbank to ask Sayaka about Eizouken's plans going forward. Asakusa comes up with some interesting new concepts, but can't tie them into her original story, angering Kanamori.
11	"Each Other's Existence!"; Transliteration: "Sorezore no Sonzai!" (Japanese: それぞれの存在！)	Atsuko Tonomizu	March 16, 2020
Asakusa continues to struggle thinking up a story for the anime, while the Security Club forcibly shuts down another school club working with Eizouken to copy DVDs before they can get to work. The Eizouken advisor plays handheld videogames and encourages the club to relax for a bit. Asakusa and Mizusaki decide to goof off near a waterway in town, and Asakusa falls into a river before Kanamori drags her out. All the while, the trio are tailed by Doumeki as she records the sounds they make. The next day, the school's Vice-Principal cuts off Eizouken from the other clubs. Asakusa and Mizusaki take a train to visit a sick Kanamori at her home, and Asakusa flashes back to when she first met Kanamori in middle school. They were both loners for different reasons, but formed a codependent relationship. While visiting Kanamori at her sickbed, Mizusaki tells Kanamori about the situation, and Kanamori shows that their efforts have generated enough media coverage that the school would only embarrass themselves by shutting down Eizouken's project. Then Asakusa reveals she thought up a story that tied all her previous wanderings together about a war between humans and kappas. With this new direction, Eizouken comes closer to finishing the anime, but Doumeki later reveals that something or someone replaced the entire audio track with a strange piano tune.
12	"Shibahama UFO Wars!"; Transliteration: "Shibahama Yūfō Taisen!" (Japanese: 芝浜ＵＦＯ大戦！)	Keisuke Inoue	March 23, 2020
After finding out their musician changed the main track at the last moment and no one checked, Mizusaki begins to panic. With time running out, Asakusa proposes changing the end of the anime to match the music track they have and keeping the dance party scene as a DVD extra. After working heavily through the night to finish their tasks, Eizouken manages to finish the anime and Kanamori takes extreme measures to get DVDs printed in time for the Comet-A convention. The trio manage to sell out their DVDs, and after the convention ends, they decide to watch their own finished product, "Shibahama UFO Wars."

=== Live-action film ===
A live-action film adaptation was announced on October 15, 2019. The film was directed by Tsutomu Hanabusa and stars members of the idol group Nogizaka46 Minami Umezawa, Asuka Saito, and Mizuki Yamashita as Sayaka Kanamori, Midori Asakusa, and Tsubame Mizusaki respectively. It was originally scheduled to release in Japan on May 15, 2020, but was postponed to September 25 of that same year, due to the COVID-19 pandemic.

=== Live-action series ===
In February 2020, it was announced that the film would be preceded by a six-episode television mini-series, with the same staff and cast as the film. The series was broadcast on MBS from April 5 to May 10, 2020. (Note: MBS listed the air dates for the series on Sunday at 24:50, which is effectively Monday at 0:50 a.m. JST.)

== Reception ==
=== Manga ===
After the debut of the anime adaptation in January 2020, the manga had over 500,000 copies in circulation.

The manga series was nominated for the eleventh Manga Taisho awards in 2018, and it won the top Bros. Comic Award in 2017. The series ranked fifteenth along with Dr. Stone on a list of the top manga of 2018 for male readers put together by Kono Manga ga Sugoi!. The School Library Journal listed the first volume of the series as one of the top 10 manga of 2021.

=== Anime ===
The anime series received widespread critical acclaim. During its airing in Japan, the series won one of the four monthly Galaxy Awards for March, becoming one of the candidates the association's yearly Galaxy Awards.

Following the conclusion of the series, Keep Your Hands Off Eizouken! received extensive positive reviews as one of the best Japanese animated series of both the season and the year at large. Both The New York Times and The New Yorker highlighted the series as one of the best television shows of 2020, with The New York Times naming it to their "Best TV Shows of 2020" and "Best International Shows of 2020" lists, and The New Yorker identifying it as one of the Best TV Shows of 2020. Singer-songwriter Elvis Costello identified it as a personal favorite in a 2021 featured article in The Guardian.

The Encyclopedia of Science Fiction described Keep Your Hands Off Eizouken! as one of the finest recent anime series, praising its joyful animation, humor and imaginative exploration of the creative process. It particularly highlighted the eccentric personalities of Kanamori and Asakusa, the latter's enthusiasm for hard science fiction and commitment to scientific plausibility being balanced by her recognition of the importance of imagination. The encyclopedia also noted the series' use of school clubs to satirize the anime industry, with the protagonists encountering creative, financial and organizational challenges in producing their films. It praised the inventive fantasy sequences that transform everyday situations into science-fiction adventures, as well as the show's affectionate depiction of animation and worldbuilding.

The series was awarded the Grand Prize for Television Animation at the 2021 Tokyo Anime Awards Festival, and won the animation division's Grand Prize of the 24th Japan Media Arts Festival.

The series was nominated in ten categories including Anime of the Year at the 5th Crunchyroll Anime Awards, and won two for Best Animation and Best Director (Masaaki Yuasa).

At the 2021 Anime Awards Brazil, an event presented in cooperation with Brazilian entertainment website Omelete, the series received nominations in ten categories and won 7, including Anime of the Year, Best Director, Best Screenwriter, and Best Animation.

=== Live action ===
The live action adaptation won Best Picture for Live-Action Visual Effects category in the 2020 CGWorld Awards. Studio Buckhorn, the studio that worked on the effects, also won the Grand Prize.

The Encyclopedia of Science Fiction, while praising the anime series, described its live-action adaptation as disappointing.

=== Awards and nominations ===
Year	Award	Category	Recipient	Result	Ref.
2021	24th Japan Media Arts Festival	Animation Division	Keep Your Hands Off Eizouken!	Won	
2021	5th Crunchyroll Anime Awards	Anime of the Year	Keep Your Hands Off Eizouken!	Nominated	
2021	5th Crunchyroll Anime Awards	Best Protagonist	Midori Asakusa	Nominated	
2021	5th Crunchyroll Anime Awards	Best Girl	Sayaka Kanamori	Nominated	
2021	5th Crunchyroll Anime Awards	Best Comedy	Keep Your Hands Off Eizouken!	Nominated	
2021	5th Crunchyroll Anime Awards	Best Animation	Keep Your Hands Off Eizouken!	Won	
2021	5th Crunchyroll Anime Awards	Best Director	Masaaki Yuasa	Won	
2021	5th Crunchyroll Anime Awards	Best Character Design	Naoyuki Asano, original designs by Sumito Oowara	Nominated	
2021	5th Crunchyroll Anime Awards	Best Score	Oorutaichi	Nominated	
2021	5th Crunchyroll Anime Awards	Best Opening Sequence	"Easy Breezy" by chelmico	Nominated	
2021	5th Crunchyroll Anime Awards	Best Voice Artist Performance (Japanese)	Mutsumi Tamura as Sayaka Kanamori	Nominated	
2021	Tokyo Anime Award Festival	Animation of the Year (Television)	Keep Your Hands Off Eizouken!	Won	
