= Love Sunset =

Studio album by Bagdad Cafe the Trench Town
- Released: August 6, 2003
- Recorded: Toshiaki Kitahata (Alchemy Studio)
- Genre: Reggae
- Length: 32:20
- Label: Independent/M.O.P. Recordings
- Producer: Kōichi Fudatate & Bagdad Cafe the Trench Town

Bagdad Cafe the Trench Town chronology
Love Sunset (2003)	Up Right and Smiley (2004)

Love Sunset is the first studio album by Bagdad Cafe the Trench Town, released in August 2003. After its release the band was featured as a new artist on Osaka's FM802 radio station. The album was recorded at Alchemy Studio, Osaka and co-produced by Toshiaki Kitahata (北畑俊明) and Bagdad Cafe the Trench Town.

== Track listing ==
No.	Title	Lyrics	Music	Length
1.	"Peechy"	May	What's Up Raita	4:44
2.	"Floor"	May	May, Ume	4:47
3.	"Try"	Sunday Kamide, What's Up Raita, Michael Punch	Sunday Kamide, What's Up Raita, Michael Punch	4:32
4.	"And Love"	Sunday Kamide	Sunday Kamide, What's Up Raita	4:30
5.	"Love after time"	Sunday Kamide	Sunday Kamide, What's Up Raita	5:06
6.	"Real down life"	Sunday Kamide	Sunday Kamide, What's Up Raita	4:57
7.	"Just for you"	May	What's Up Raita	3:44

== Personnel ==
The following details are taken from the inlay card of the album. The names of some members are written differently than on subsequent albums.

- May - vocals
- What's Up Raita - guitar
- Mura - guitar
- Mountain - bass
- Tico Arai - drums
- Michael Punch - piano
- Big Mama - chorus
- Ran - chorus
- Iwai Long Seller - organ
- Mr. Soulman - tenor saxophone
- Ume - trombone
- Sunday Kamide (Sunday カミデ) - lyrics
