= Ryōhei Ōwa =

Japanese photographer

Ryōhei Ōwa (大和 良平, Ōwa Ryōhei; 1909 - 1981) was a Japanese photographer.
