= Dramatiques =

Studio album by Emi Hinouchi
- Released: November 27, 2003
- Genre: J-Urban, J-Pop

Emi Hinouchi chronology
Dramatiques (2003)	ME... (2008)

Singles from Dramatiques
- 1. "Magic/World" Released: November 20, 2002; 2. "Crying" Released: April 23, 2003; 3. "Freak!" Released: July 30, 2003; 4. "Painful" Released: October 29, 2003

Dramatiques is the first album from the J-Urban artist Emi Hinouchi. It was released on November 27, 2003.

== Track listing ==
1. Dramatiques Intro
2. Trap
3. hey boy...
4. You said, You did feat. HI-D
5. Freak!
6. let it be
7. brand new love
8. Show Me What You Got
9. What's Your Secret? feat. MIC BANDITZ
10. Crying
11. World
12. You were my everything
13. Magic
14. Painful
15. Magic (Magic CKB Tune remixed by CRAZY KEN BAND)
