= Chelmico =

Japanese rap duo

chelmico
- Origin: Tokyo, Japan
- Genres: Hip hop, J-rap, J-pop, Electropop, Neo Shibuya-kei
- Years active: 2014–present
- Labels: TREKKIE TRAX; Cupcake ATM unBORDE
- Members: Rachel; Mamiko
- Website: chelmico.com

chelmico (チェルミコ cherumiko) is a rap duo from Japan composed of Rachel Watashiga and Mamiko Suzuki, known professionally as Rachel and Mamiko, respectively. "chelmico" is a portmanteau of the duo's names.

== Career ==
chelmico formed in 2014 after Rachel Watashiga and Mamiko Suzuki met through a mutual friend at a McDonald's in Arakawa, in Tokyo, Japan. The two bonded over a love of music, particularly over Japanese hip-hop group Rip Slyme, and soon became regular friends. At the time, Watashiga did some modeling work and appeared in the background of music videos for Ōmori Seiko. When one of her friends offered her 10 minutes during a music event they were organizing in spring of 2014, Watashiga invited Suzuki to rap with her.

The next step came a year later, when they were given another offer to perform at another show for fifteen minutes. The two reached out to rapper PAGE, then known as Holly Page, to provide a track while they wrote lyrics. The result was Labyrinth '97, their first single. Their first self-titled album was released in October 2016 under the Cupcake ATM label. In 2018, they released their album POWER under unBORDE, a division of Warner Music Japan, who they have been with since then.

Their single, Easy Breezy, (released January 17, 2020) was used as the opening theme song for the anime adaptation of Keep Your Hands Off Eizouken! Later that year, they appeared on the m-flo single RUN AWAYS.

Two singles, milk and Disco (Bad dance doesn't matter), were released in July and August (respectively) preempting their third album, maze. The album released on August 26, 2020.

On March 14, 2021, Rachel announced she would take a hiatus from performing due to her marriage and pregnancy. She expressed a hope to return to music by the end of the year. Rachel announced she gave birth to her first child on June 7, 2021.

The duo released their third EP, 'COZY' on April 16, 2021, following the release of their single of the same name earlier that month.

On November 19, 2021, the duo released a single entitled '300 Million Yen'. This was followed by another single on March 17, 2022, titled 'Meidaimae'. Both of these would feature in their next studio album, 'Gokigen', which released on June 1, 2022.

== Members ==
=== Rachel ===
- Name: Rachel Watashiga (渡賀レイチェル)
- Birth date: July 4, 1993 (age 33)
- Birthplace: Kanagawa Prefecture

=== Mamiko ===
- Name: Mamiko Suzuki (鈴木真海子)
- Birth date: June 26, 1996 (age 30)
- Birthplace: Tokyo

== Discography ==
=== Studio albums ===
List of studio albums, with selected chart positions
Title	Album details	Peak positions	
Title	Album details	Hot 100	Oricon
chelmico	Released: October 19, 2016 (CD), March 7, 2018 (LP); Label: Cupcake ATM; Formats: CD, LP	—	117
Power	Released: August 8, 2018; Label: Warner Music Japan, unBORDE; Formats: CD	41	55
Fishing	Released: August 21, 2019; Label: Warner Music Japan; Formats: CD	27	49
Maze	Released: August 26, 2020; Label: Warner Music Japan; Formats: CD	40	40
Gokigen	Released: June 1, 2022; Label: Warner Music Japan; Formats: CD	41	36
"—" denotes a recording that did not chart

=== Mini-albums ===
List of mini-albums, with selected chart positions
Title	Album details	Peak positions	
Title	Album details	Hot 100	Oricon
Love Is Over	Released: June 8, 2016; Label: Trekkie Trax; Formats: FLAC	—	—
EP	Released: August 18, 2017; Label: Cupcake ATM; Formats: CD, LP	—	90
Cozy	Released: April 16, 2021; Label: Warner Music Japan, unBORDE; Formats: FLAC	—	—
"—" denotes a recording that did not chart

=== Singles ===
List of singles, with selected chart positions, showing year released and album name
Title	Year	Peak positions		Album
Title	Year	Hot 100	Oricon	Album
"ラビリンス'97"	2015	—	—	chelmico
"JuneJuly"	2015	—	—	chelmico
"Oh, Baby!"	2015	—	—	chelmico
"ラビリンス'97" (Night of Garage Remix)	2016	—	—	chelmico
"Summer Holiday"	2016	100	—	chelmico
"Labyrinth'97" / "Night Camel" feat. FBI	2017	—	—	chelmico
"ママレードボーイ" / "Love Is Over"	2017	—	—	chelmico
"OK, Cheers!"	2018	—	—	Power
"Banana"	2018	—	—	Power
"爽健美茶のラップ"	2019	—	—	Fishing
"Switch"	2019	—	—	Fishing
"Easy Breezy"	2020	—	—	Maze
"Limit"	2020	—	—	Maze
"Milk"	2020	—	—	Maze
"Disco (Bad Dance Doesn't Matter)"	2020	—	—	Maze
"—" denotes a recording that did not chart

=== Additional music work ===
- Trekkie Trax The Best 2016–2017 (2018)
  - 1. "Love Is Over"
  - 19. "Love Is Over" (Tomggg Remix)
- Onigawara – チョコレイトをちょうだい (2015)
  - 2. "YOU×3"
- Ken Hirai – Half of Me (2018)
  - 2. "Holic"
- Back Street Girls – Idol Kills (2019)
  - 8. "Why"
- M-Flo – "Run Aways" (2020) (as m-flo♡chelmico)
- Stamp – "HIDE YOU feat.chelmico" (2021)
- Pasocom Music Club – FINE LINE (2023)
  - 2. "PUMP! feat.chelmico"
- M-Flo – "Superliminal" (2026)
  - "Run Aways" (as m-flo loves chelmico)

== Cast ==
=== Radio ===
- chelmico - But It's Still Saturday (Scheduled to air from January 4, 2020 - the end of March on TBS Radio)
- Ogi Yahagi no Meganebiiki (January 3, 2020 on TBS Radio) (Mamiko only)
- All Night Nippon 0 (ZERO) (May 18, 2019 on Nippon Broadcasting)
