= Square One (M-Flo album) =

Studio album by M-Flo
- Released: March 14, 2012
- Recorded: 2011–2012
- Genre: Electro house; electropop; drum and bass
- Length: 67:51
- Language: Japanese; English
- Label: Rhythm Zone
- Producer: M-Flo

M-Flo chronology
| M-Flo Inside: Works Best IV (2010) | Square One (2012) | M-Flo DJ Mix: Bon! Enkai (2012) |

Singles from Square One
- 1. "She's So (Outta Control)" Released: February 29, 2012 (digital download); 2. "Don't Stop Me Now" Released: May 26, 2013 (tour exclusive)

Square One is Japanese dance and hip-hop group M-Flo's sixth original studio album, released on March 12, 2012. It was the group's first studio album in five years, after Cosmicolor (2007).

== Background ==
In the time between the release of Cosmicolor and Square One, M-Flo released two greatest hits albums, Award Supernova: Loves Best (2008) and MF10: 10th Anniversary Best (2009) and two outside collaborations compilation albums, M-Flo Inside: Works Best III (2009) and M-Flo Inside: Works Best IV (2010). DJ Taku Takahashi in 2010 launched his second record label, TCY Recording, featuring a collection of unsigned dance musicians. He also produced the soundtrack for the Gainax animated series Panty & Stocking with Garterbelt in 2010, featuring the dance musicians of his newly formed label. The Panty & Stocking with Garterbelt soundtrack was very successful, becoming the third most sold anime soundtrack in 2011 with 30,000 copies sold.

Rapper Verbal directed his first music video in 2010, with MINMI's "Patto Hana Saku." He launched his solo career in 2010 and 2011, with the album Visionair, featuring collaborations with Namie Amuro, Lil Wayne and Nicki Minaj. Takahashi also debuted with a solo project, under the name The Suitboys, releasing a non-stop DJ mix CD After 5 Vol. 1 in March 2012.

Taku Takahashi created a dance music web radio station called block.fm, featuring Japanese and overseas DJs as radio hosts, including Verbal. The radio station began airing on November 11, 2011.

== Conception and writing ==
The album was announced as a third stage in M-Flo's career, featuring Lisa as the group's vocalist between 1998 and 2002, and their "loves" era between 2003 and 2008, which featured billed guest vocalists on most of their recordings. For this third stage, M-Flo saw this as a return to their roots, which was the reasoning for the album title, Square One. The album was produced without concerns for what the industry or their management were concerned about, which was similar to how M-Flo had pursued their career when they debuted.

Square One took a lot of time to create compared to their previous albums, because Verbal and Taku Takahashi needed to get used to each other's styles and ideas again. Verbal believed that Square One showed off both of the work in their solo careers strongly.

The songs were written and produced by M-Flo members Taku Takahashi and Verbal. Eight songs were written in collaboration with fellow Rhythm Zone artist Cream's vocalist, Minami (including the song "All I Want Is You"), as well as two songs featuring lyrics by Cream's rapper Staxx T. The song "Don't Stop Me Now" featured lyrics former Hi-Standard vocalist Akihiro Namba, and FLJ music magazine producer Toshiya Ohno.

While the songs feature guest vocalists similar to their loves albums, the artists names were not announced. Verbal explained the reasoning behind this was that people attach a certain value and preconception to the name of an artist, and would pay more attention to the music itself if the names were not announced.

The song "Sure Shot Ricky" sampled the viral commercial song "Shōshūriki no Uta" (消臭力のうた), sung by 13-year-old Portuguese boy Miguel Guerreiro. Verbal said the song was chosen as if it were played at a club, it would be a song everyone knows and everyone enjoys.

== Promotion ==
The song "Run" was first performed on September 15, 2011 with Mademoiselle Yulia at Reebok's Reethem & Lite launch party, when Verbal was chosen as the Asia creative director for Reebok.

M-Flo held a concert and DJ event at AgeHa in Koto, Tokyo on December 22, 2011 called Bōnenkai (End-of-Year Party). The event featured a set with M-Flo's new material, as well as DJs Yasutaka Nakata (Capsule), Fantastic Plastic Machine, and a set with Panty & Stocking with Garterbelt collaborators TeddyLoid, Hoshina Anniversary and Booty Bronx. The concert featured material from Square One, an excerpt of which was featured on the DVD of the album.

"She's So (Outta Control)" was released as the leading track from the album, two weeks before the album's release on February 29, 2012. It is a collaboration with South Korean pop/R&B group 2NE1 on vocals. The song reached number 43 on the Billboard Japan Hot 100 chart. Three music videos were produced for songs on the album: "She's So (Outta Control)," as well as the tracks "All I Want Is You" and "Alive." Due to digital downloads, the song "Alive" debuted at number 81 on the Billboard Japan Hot 100.

12 of the 19 album tracks were released for download on cellphone download provider Recochoku on February 29, 2012.

A special edition of the album was released at Tsutaya, featuring a bonus CD with "Let Go (VIP Mix)," a remix by Taku Takahashi of their 2006 hit song. Verbal held a special event at Shinjuku's Tsutaya store on March 18, 2012 where he acted as the store manager, and will hold another on April 14 at Okayama's Tsushima Mall Tsutaya store.

Two of the songs featured commercial tie-ups. "She's So (Outta Control)" was used as the March 2012 opening theme song for the TV Asahi show Musicru TV, and was chosen as MTV Japan's March 2012 buzz clip. "Don't Stop Me Now" will be used as the opening theme song for the drama Toshidensetsu no Onna, starring Masami Nagasawa. The drama began airing on April 13, 2012. "Don't Stop Me Now" was released as a tour exclusive single at their M-Flo Tour 2012 'Square One'.

On May 6, 2012, "Alive" was performed live by Verbal and Exile's Atsushi on Exile's weekly television show Exile Tamashii.

== Tours ==
M-Flo held a four-date tour Japan, M-Flo Tour 2012 'Square One' in May and June 2012, in the cities Chiba, Fukuoka, Osaka and Nagoya.

M-Flo organised the first event at Avex festival A-Nation for 2012, Oto Matsuri held on August 3, 2012. They also held their second annual Bonenkai end-of-year club party, on December 21, 2012, at the club Ageha.

== Track listing ==
| No. | Title | Writer(s) | Length |
|---|---|---|---|
| 1. | "□ [Sayonara_2012]" | M-Flo | 3:00 |
| 2. | "Perfect Place" | M-Flo, Minami (Cream) | 3:56 |
| 3. | "Alive" | M-Flo, Exile Atsushi | 4:23 |
| 4. | "□ [Frozen_Space_Project]" | M-Flo | 1:18 |
| 5. | "Never Needed You" | M-Flo, Minami (Cream) | 3:49 |
| 6. | "Oh Baby" | M-Flo | 4:46 |
| 7. | "□ [Square1_Scene_1 Murder_He_Wrote]" | M-Flo | 2:03 |
| 8. | "Don't Stop Me Now" | M-Flo, Akihiro Namba, Toshiya Ohno | 5:09 |
| 9. | "All I Want Is You" | M-Flo, Minami (Cream), Staxx T (Cream) | 5:10 |
| 10. | "Acid 02" | M-Flo | 4:45 |
| 11. | "Call Me" | M-Flo, Minami (Cream) | 3:15 |
| 12. | "□ [OK_I_Called]" | M-Flo | 0:12 |
| 13. | "Sure Shot Ricky" | M-Flo, Koji Kage, Maki Nishijima, Yosuke Fukui | 3:41 |
| 14. | "Run" | M-Flo, Minami (Cream) | 5:01 |
| 15. | "□ [Square1_Scene_2_Don't_Blink]" | M-Flo | 2:35 |
| 16. | "So Mama I'd Love to Catch Up, OK?" | M-Flo | 4:19 |
| 17. | "She's So (Outta Control)" | M-Flo, Minami (Cream) | 4:33 |
| 18. | "Yesterday" | M-Flo, Minami (Cream), Staxx T (Cream) | 5:14 |
| 19. | "□ [To_Be_Continued…]" | M-Flo | 0:31 |
| Total length: | | | 1:07:51 |

DVD
| No. | Title | Director | Length |
|---|---|---|---|
| 1. | "She's So (Outta Control) (Music Video)" | Masatsugu Nagasoe |
| 2. | "All I Want Is You (Music Video)" | Hidenobu Tanabe |
| 3. | "Alive (Music Video)" | Meunière Nakamura |
| 4. | "Live at "m-flo presents Bonenkai 2011" (TCY Snippet Edit)" |

== Charts and sales ==
| Chart (2012) | Peak position |
|---|---|
| Japan Daily Albums (Oricon) | 4 |
| Japan Weekly Albums (Oricon) | 10 |
| Japan Monthly Albums (Oricon) | 31 |

=== Sales ===
| Chart | Amount |
|---|---|
| Oricon physical sales | 26,000 |

== Personnel ==
Credits for Square One adapted from the liner booklet.

- Masaji Asakawa – executive production for Artimage
- Junji Chiba – keyboards (track 6)
- Ryuhei Chiba – executive supervision
- Kurt "KC" Common – narrator (track 1)
- El Poco Maro – programming (track 16)
- Taiki Fudanotsuji – assistant recording engineer (track 4, 7, 15, 18–19)
- Yosuke Fukui – lyrics (track 13), music composition (track 13)
- Chisa Fukuyama – narrator (track 4, 7)
- Stewart Hawkes – mastering (track 1–6, 8–11, 13–14, 16–19)
- Shinji Hayashi – executive supervision
- Mitsunori Ikeda – guitars (track 9), mixing (track 2–3, 5–6, 8–11, 13–14, 16–18), programming (track 1–3, 5–11, 13–14, 17–19), recording engineer (track 2–3, 5–6, 8–11, 13–14, 16–18)
- Osamu "Shu" Imamoto – recording engineer (track 2–3, 5, 8–9, 11, 14 17)
- Hiroshi Inagaki – general producer
- Koji Kage – lyrics (track 13)
- Naoki Kakuta – recording engineer (track 3)
- Keigo – guitars (track 8)
- Lee Kyungjoon – recording engineer (track 17)
- Yasuji Maeda – mastering (track 7, 12, 15)
- Masato "Max" Matsuura – executive production for Avex Group
- Minami (Cream)– lyrics (track 2–3, 5, 9, 11, 14, 17–18), music composition (track 2–3, 5, 9, 11, 14, 17–18)
- Akihiro Namba – bass (track 8), lyrics (track 8), music composition (track 8)
- Ryosuke Nakanishi – soundtrack, programming (track 4, 7, 19)
- Maki Nishijima – lyrics (track 13)
- Toshiya Ohno – vocal direction (track 8), lyrics (track 8), music composition (track 8)
- Rim Juhee – narrator (track 1)
- Morley Robertson – serge synthesizer (track 15)
- Jun Sasaki – keyboards (track 18)
- Dai Satō – Square One interlude co-author
- Yoshihiro Seki – general producer for Avex Entertainment, inc.
- Seiji Sekine – mixing (track 1, 4, 7, 12, 15, 19), recording engineer (track 4, 7, 15, 18–19)
- Staxx T (Cream) – lyrics (track 9), music composition (track 9), vocal direction (track 9)
- Taku Takahashi – lyrics (track 2–3, 5–6, 8, 9–11, 13–14, 16–18), music composition (track 1–19), production, programming (track 1–3, 5–11, 13–14, 16–19), recording engineer (track 6)
- Muga Takeda – Square One interlude co-author
- Yoshinori Takeshita – narrator (track 1)
- Shigeru Takeuchi – executive supervision
- Teddy – vocal direction (track 17)
- TeddyLoid – programming (track 16)
- Taiichi Uesawa – recording engineer (track 1–2, 4, 7, 15, 19)
- Lucas Valentine – recording engineer (track 5, 10–11, 18)
- Verbal – executive planning, direction, lyrics (track 2–3, 5–6, 8, 9–11, 13–14, 16–18), music composition (track 1–19), production
- Yu Li Xin – narrator (track 1)
- Yutaro Wada – assistant recording engineer (track 3)
- Yoon – Art direction, design, styling

== Release history ==
| Region | Date | Format | Distributing Label | Ref. |
|---|---|---|---|---|
| Japan | March 12, 2012 | CD, CD+DVD | Rhythm Zone | |
| Japan | March 31, 2012 | Rental CD | Rhythm Zone | |
| Taiwan | April 6, 2012 | CD+DVD | Avex Taiwan | |
| Hong Kong | April 11, 2012 | CD+DVD | Avex Asia | |
