= Ryōhei Mori =

Japanese scientist and entrepreneur

- 森 良平
- Born: November 1973 (age 52); Kawanishi, Hyōgo, Japan
- Education: Kyoto Institute of Technology; Kyoto University; Harvard Business School
- Occupations: Scientist, Inventor, Entrepreneur
- Employer(s): Green Science Alliance Co., Ltd. Fuji Pigment Co., Ltd. Quantum Materials Technology e-Gle Tech Co., Ltd.
- Known for: Eco-friendly green technologies, rechargeable aluminium-based batteries, recycled lithium-ion batteries, CO₂ conversion, quantum dots, biodegradable plastics

Ryōhei Mori (森 良平, born November 1973) is a Japanese scientist, inventor, and entrepreneur. He is the CEO of Green Science Alliance Co., Ltd. and Fuji Pigment Co., Ltd., and serves as President of Quantum Materials Technology and e-Gle Tech Co., Ltd. Mori is known for his work in eco-friendly green technologies, including aluminium-based rechargeable batteries, recycled lithium-ion batteries derived from black mass, carbon dioxide (CO₂) conversion methods, quantum dots, metal–organic frameworks, deep eutectic solvents, solid acid catalysts, and petroleum-free biodegradable plastics and plant biomass-based materials.

== Education ==
Mori earned his undergraduate degree in Applied Biology from Kyoto Institute of Technology in 1997. He received his M.Sc. (1999) and Ph.D. in engineering (2005) from Kyoto University. In 2021, he completed the General Management Program at Harvard Business School.

== Career ==
Mori joined Fuji Pigment Co., Ltd., where he later became CEO. In 2010, he established Green Science Alliance Co., Ltd. He has developed and commercialized rechargeable aluminium-based battery systems designed for safer and more sustainable energy storage, including aqueous aluminium-ion batteries and recycled lithium-ion batteries produced from black mass.

He is also known for creating fully biodegradable plastics and a wide range of bio-based materials derived from natural plant biomass without using petroleum-based components.

In 2023, his work on plant- and biomass-based biochemical materials was featured on the cover of RSC Sustainability.

In 2025, his work on aqueous aluminium-ion batteries was featured on the cover of Energy Advances.

Green Science Alliance Co., Ltd. is supported by United Nations organizations. The company was selected as a green technology startup supported by the incubation programme of UNOPS GIC Japan in 2020, and their green technologies are registered at WIPO GREEN. In 2025, the company acquired grant funding for a green industrial recovery project for Ukraine from UNIDO.

Dr. Mori participated as a speaker at the United Nations Pavilion at EXPO 2025 Osaka, Japan, in October 2025 to showcase WIPO GREEN's role in providing sustainable solutions. He was featured in Newsweek International magazine to promote sustainable innovation in July 2025, and was also described as one of the startup company CEOs showcasing at EXPO 2025 Osaka in Time Magazine in April 2025.

== Research focus ==
Mori’s research focuses on sustainable technologies in energy and materials science. His work includes rechargeable aluminium-based batteries, recycled lithium-ion batteries from black mass, and carbon dioxide conversion technologies.

He has also developed biodegradable polymers and chemicals derived from natural biomass to replace petroleum-based plastics.

Furthermore, Mori has been involved in the development of quantum dot applications. Specifically, he has developed quantum dots made from various types of waste, such as organic biomass waste, plastic waste, food waste, household garbage, and solid municipal waste, which can be applied to fertilizers, antimicrobial materials, pesticides, and insect repellents. He is also intensively researching metal–organic frameworks, deep eutectic solvents, solid acid catalysts, platinum-free (or reduced) fuel cells, perovskite solar cells, and organic thin-film solar cells.

== Awards ==
- Best H!NT Award (2015)
- Global Metals Award, S&P Global Platts (2018)

== Selected publications ==
- Mori, Ryohei (2017-06-27). "Suppression of byproduct accumulation in rechargeable aluminum–air batteries using non-oxide ceramic materials as air cathode materials". Sustainable Energy & Fuels. 1 (5): 1082–1089. doi:10.1039/C7SE00087A.
- Mori, Ryohei (2015-05-01). "Inorganic–organic hybrid biodegradable polyurethane resin derived from liquefied Sakura wood". Wood Science and Technology. 49 (3): 507–516. doi:10.1007/s00226-015-0707-y.
- Mori, Ryohei (2022-02-04). Next Generation Type Lithium Ion Battery and All Solid State Lithium Ion Battery (in Japanese). Amazon Digital Services LLC. ASIN B09RTXWV6G.
- Mori, Ryohei (2023). "Replacing all petroleum-based chemical products with natural biomass-based chemical products: a tutorial review". RSC Sustainability. 1 (2): 179–212. doi:10.1039/D2SU00014H.
- Mori, Ryohei (2025). "Aqueous aluminium-ion battery for sustainable energy storage". Energy Advances. doi:10.1039/D5YA00148J.
