= Bagdad Cafe the Trench Town =

Japanese reggae band

- Origin: Osaka, Japan
- Genres: Japanese reggae
- Years active: 2001–present
- Labels: Victor Entertainment
- Members: Mai; Raita; Muramoto; Big Mom; Ran; Michael Punch; Umeken; Iwai Longseller; Ogi; Yama; Banchō
- Past members: Tico Arai - drums Mr. Soulman - tenor sax.
- Website: Official Site

Bagdad Cafe the Trench Town is Japanese reggae band founded in 2001. Their début album Love Sunset was released in 2003. The front-woman, Mai, sings mostly in Japanese but adds in many English words too. In 2008 the band took part in the Fuji Rock Festival for the first time.

The group took their name from a combination of the 1987 West German movie "Bagdad Café", and the Trenchtown neighbourhood in Kingston, Jamaica.

== Members ==
- Mai - vocals
- Raita - guitar
- Muramoto - guitar
- Big mom - chorus
- Ran - chorus
- Michael Punch (マイケル☆パンチ) - piano
- Umeken - trombone
- Iwai Longseller (岩井ロングセラー) - organ
- Ogi - tenor saxophone
- Yama - bass
- Banchō (番長) - drums

== Discography ==
=== Studio albums ===
Title	Release date	Label	Japan Oricon Chart Peak Positions
Love Sunset	August 6, 2003	Independent	－
Up Right and Smiley	June 23, 2004	Independent	233
Movin' On	September 22, 2005	Victor	226
Good Times	August 9, 2006	Victor	75
Satisfaction	July 25, 2007	Victor	102
We're Living	July 22, 2009	Victor	221

=== Singles ===
Title	Release date	Label	Album
Everything	August 31, 2005	Victor	Movin' On
Sunshine	July 19, 2006	Victor	Good Times
Nice Time	July 25, 2007	Victor	Satisfaction

=== Compilations ===
Title	Release date	Label	Japan Oricon Chart Peak Positions
Meets the Reggae: Passing Point	September 21, 2007	Victor	204
