= Cosmicolor =

Studio album by M-Flo
- Released: March 28, 2007
- Recorded: 2006–2007
- Genre: J-Urban
- Label: Rhythm Zone
- Producer: M-Flo

M-Flo chronology
M-Flo Inside: Works Best II (2006)	Cosmicolor (2007)	ElectriColor (2007)

Singles from Cosmicolor
- 1. "Summer Time Love" Released: June 28, 2006; 2. "Love Song" Released: November 8, 2006

Cosmicolor is the fifth studio album by Japanese hip-hop group M-Flo. Two singles preceded the release of the album: "Summer Time Love" featuring Emi Hinouchi & Ryohei was released on June 28, 2006, and "Love Song" featuring Bonnie Pink was released on November 8, 2006. The full album was made available via Rhythm Zone on March 28, 2007.

Commercially, Cosmicolor experienced success in Japan, peaking at number three on the weekly Oricon Albums Chart and was certified platinum by the RIAJ for physical shipments of over 250,000 units within a month of its release.

== Background and release ==
According to the official website, the album is the last release in the "M-Flo Loves" series, which started in 2003 with "Reeewind! / M-Flo Loves Crystal Kay". As a response to that, the album includes a new collaboration with Crystal Kay, symbolizing that the "Loves" series started and ends with her. To reflect the fact that this is the last release in the "Loves" series, every track on the album (excluding the interludes), has the word "love" in its title. It was not announced what direction the band would take after this release, though the band stated in an interview that it would not disband.

The album was released in CD and CD+DVD formats, a first for an M-Flo release and has 13 tracks, excluding interludes. The DVD contains the videos for the songs "Summer Time Love", "Lotta Love", "Love Song" and "She Loves the Cream", a DVJMIX by DJ Uppercut (a music video remix) and a feature titled "History of M-Flo", which is a mix of their previous works. The limited press edition of the CD+DVD format also has two performances by M-Flo member Verbal and past member, Lisa at Rhythm Nation: "Come Again" and "Been So Long".

== Reception ==
In its opening week on the Oricon Albums Chart, Cosmicolor peaked at number three, selling 76,680 copies. The following week, it descended one position to number four with an additional 33,306 copies sold. In April 2007, the album was certified platinum by the Recording Industry Association of Japan (RIAJ) for having surpassed 250,000 units in physical shipments. On the year-end issue of the Oricon Album Chart, Cosmicolor ranked at number 72, having sold 172,217 copies throughout the year. On the Taiwan G-Music J-pop Albums chart, the record achieved a peak position of number seven.

== Track listing ==
1. "Issue No. 5"
2. "Love Don't Cry" [M-Flo Loves Crystal Kay]
3. "Luvotomy" [M-Flo Loves Namie Amuro]
4. "Stuck in Your Love" [M-Flo Loves Melody.]
5. "Current Affairs" [M-Flo Loves Valerie]
6. "Summer Time Love" [M-Flo Loves Emi Hinouchi & Ryohei]
7. "Simple & Lovely" [M-Flo Loves Kumi Koda]
8. "Picture Perfect Love" [M-Flo Loves Monkey Majik]
9. "Music Monopoly"
10. "She Loves the Cream" [M-Flo Loves Doping Panda]
11. "Love Me After 12AM" [M-Flo Loves Alex (Clazziquai Project)]
12. "Love Song" [M-Flo Loves Bonnie Pink]
13. "Love Long and Prosper" [M-Flo Loves Star Trek]
14. "Love Me, Hate the Game" [M-Flo Loves Chan, Thaitanium, Edison Chen, Ryohei]
15. "Lotta Love" [M-Flo Loves Minmi]
16. "People of Cosmicolor"
17. "Love to Live By" [M-Flo Loves Chara]

== Charts ==
=== Album ===
Chart (2007)	Peak position
Japanese Daily Albums (Oricon)	2
Japanese Weekly Albums (Oricon)	3
Japanese Yearly Albums (Oricon)	72
Taiwan J-pop Albums (G-Music)	7

=== Singles ===
Release date	Title	Peak position	Chart run	Sales	Ref.
June 28, 2006	"Summer Time Love"	12	6 weeks	26,000	
November 8, 2006	"Love Song"	9	6 weeks	25,000	

== Sales and certifications ==
Region	Certification	Certified units/sales
Japan (RIAJ)	Platinum	250,000^{^}
^{^} Shipments figures based on certification alone.
