= Expo Expo =

Studio album by M-Flo
- Released: March 28, 2001
- Recorded: 2000–2001
- Genre: J-Urban
- Label: Rhythm Zone
- Producer: M-Flo

M-Flo chronology
The Replacement Percussionists (2000)	Expo Expo (2001)	Expo Bōei Robot Gran Sonik (2001)

Singles from Expo Expo
- 1. "How You Like Me Now?" Released: September 6, 2000; 2. "Come Again" Released: January 17, 2001; 3. "Orbit-3" Released: March 14, 2001; 4. "Prism" Released: May 9, 2001; 5. "Dispatch" Released: July 25, 2001; 6. "Yours Only, / Lies" Released: October 31, 2001

Expo Expo is the second studio album by Japanese hip-hop group M-Flo. The thematic concept of the record is set at a virtual world expo, with Coldfeet of Lori Fine and narrator Mako Hattori participating in the interlude. Six singles were spawned off of the album, including "How You Like Me Now?" and "Come Again", which were both certified by the RIAJ in different categories. Remixes of songs from this album were released as Expo Bouei Robot Gran Sonik.

== Reception ==
Following its release, Expo Expo experienced commercial success in Japan. It peaked at number three on the Oricon Albums Chart, becoming the group's first top-five entry. Within days of its release, it was certified platinum by the Recording Industry Association of Japan (RIAJ) for having surpassed 400,000 units in physical shipments. It sold 557,000 copies by the end of the year, and was ranked the 35th best-selling album in the country on the year-end Oricon chart.

== Track listing ==
1. "正門" (Seimon; Front Gate)
2. "Prism"
3. "東門" (Higashimon; East Gate)
4. "Expo Expo" [feat. Towa Tei, Bahamadia & Chops]
5. "What It Is"
6. "Orbit-3"
7. "南門" (Minamimon; South Gate)
8. "Dispatch" [feat. Dev Large, Nipps & Vincent Galluo]
9. "Magenta Rain"
10. "中央タワー" (Chuo Tower; Central Tower)
11. "Come Again"
12. "西門" (Nishimon; West Gate)
13. "Yours Only"
14. "How You Like Me Now?"
15. "アリガトウ" (Arigatou; Thank You)
16. "The Bandwagon"

== Charts and sales ==
=== Album ===
Album chart positions
Chart (2001)	Peak position
Japanese Weekly Albums (Oricon)	3
Japanese Yearly Albums (Oricon)	35

Sales and certifications
Region	Certification	Certified units/sales
Japan (RIAJ)	Platinum	557,000

=== Singles ===
Release date	Title	Peak position	Sales/certifications	Ref.
September 6, 2000	"How You Like Me Now?"	9	224,000 (gold)	
January 17, 2001	"Come Again"	4	390,000 (platinum)	
March 14, 2001	"Orbit-3"	9	64,000	
May 9, 2001	"Prism"	15	26,000	
July 25, 2001	"Dispatch"	34	10,000	
October 31, 2001	"Yours Only, / Lies"	25	20,000	

== Release history ==
Region	Date	Format	Catalog number	Label	Ref.
Japan	March 28, 2001	CD, digital download	RZCD-45021	Rhythm Zone	
