= Ryohei Yamamoto =

Japanese singer (born 1974)

Ryohei
- Born: Ryohei Yamamoto; 30 December 1974 (age 51); Kyoto, Japan
- Origin: Japan
- Genres: R&B/pop
- Years active: 2003 - present
- Labels: Warner Music Japan; Rhythm Zone
- Website: https://ryoheiyamamoto.info/

Ryohei Yamamoto (Japanese: 山本 領平, Hepburn: Yamamoto Ryōhei; born December 30, 1974, in Kyoto) is a Japanese R&B singer, also known as just Ryohei.

== Career ==
Ryohei debuted as "山本領平" (written in kanji) under Warner Music Japan on 2003 with single "Almost There". Prior to that, in November 2002, he was featured on a track "Why Not?" by Fantastic Plastic Machine.

In 2006 he shortened his name to just "Ryohei" (written in Roman letters) and transferred to the label Rhythm Zone. He is known for his collaborations with m-flo, being featured on tracks such as "Miss You" and "Summer Time Love".

For a time, Ryohei was one of the most popular artists on iTunes Japan, with his single 'So Fly' reaching No. 1.

His last release as a singer was in 2007. Since then, he has written for artists including Koda Kumi.

== Discography ==
=== Album ===
Album Title: Take Over
Release Date: September 23, 2004
Label: Warner Music Japan
Tracks:

1. Intro
2. Take Over
3. Speedway
4. Set Free
5. この空に
6. Can't You See?
7. Game We Played
8. Almost There
9. Rainy Days
10. Fantasy
11. Why Not, Darling?
12. Purify
13. Moon Sexy
14. Believe Me
15. Let It Flow
16. Outro

Album Title: ReListen
Release Date: February 7, 2007
Features: M-Flo, Lisa
Label: Rhythm Zone
Tracks:

1. Intro
2. Onelove (feat. Verbal (M-Flo))
3. ReListen (feat. Lisa)
4. あなたの手
5. World
6. Like This
7. Upside Down
8. you said...
9. Just Want
10. the LIGHT
11. In My Arms
12. Gift
13. Outro

Bonus Tracks

1. After The Love Has Gone
2. A Night To Remember
3. Sincere

=== Singles ===
1st Single: Onelove Release Date: March 8, 2006
Features: M-Flo
Tracks:

1. onelove
2. Just Want
3. onelove [instrumental]
4. Just Want [instrumental]

2nd Single: the LIGHT
Release Date: July 26, 2006
Tracks:

1. the LIGHT
2. Like This
3. the LIGHT [instrumental]
4. Like This [instrumental]

3rd Single: you said...
Release Date: November 1, 2006
Tracks:

1. you said...
2. One Sugar Dream -Ryohei version-
3. Special acoustic live medley at JZ Brat on 16 October 2006
4. you said...[instrumental]
