= Yoshika (singer) =

Japanese singer (born 1983)

- Born: Unknown; 20 December 1983 (age 42)
- Origin: Japan
- Genres: Contemporary R&B, R&B
- Occupation: Singer
- Years active: 2003–present
- Labels: Red Alert Records (2002–2004); Atlantic Japan (2005–2006); Grand Trax(2008–)
- Website: http://www.yoshika.info/

Yoshika (ヨシカ) is a Japanese singer, who sings mainly with R&B influences. Her major label debut album, Timeless, was released in January 2006.

== Biography ==
Yoshika spent much of her youth in Canada and the United States, studying at a high school in Modesto, California and influenced by American R&B.

Influenced by Common (rapper), India.Arie, and Jill Scott, she returned to Japan at the age of 18. She recorded a song titled "Jolie" for a TV commercial which was picked up for release, leading to her meeting Japanese Hip-Hop producers m-flo. For her major label debut "Timeless" on Atlantic Records she intended to bring a strong sense of American R&B to a new Japanese scene led by Double (singer), Heartsdales, and Bennie K.

Shortly after the release, on 24 May 2006, Yoshika announced on her official website that she was pregnant and that she would halt her career to get married. She returned on 24 December 2008 with the release of a new album, World, on a new label, Grand Trax. Her latest original album, Redwood Tree was released on 13 January 2010, with a live album, "I Sing -Live Best-" following two months later.

== Discography ==
=== Original albums ===
- STRAIGHT AHEAD (2003)
- Timeless (2006)
- World (2008)
- REDWOOD TREE (2010)
- YOSHIKA (2015)
- In Such Darkness (2019)
- Deep Forest (2025)

== Other albums ==
- I Sing -Live Best- (2010)
- Strongly in Life (2010) (digital EP)
- About a Beautiful Mistake (2018) (digital EP)

=== Singles ===
- Jolie (2003)
- Let Go (m-flo loves Yoshika) (2004)
- Call Me (2005)
- Just Us (2005)
- Stand Up (2008)
- Touch (2008) (digital single)
- X'mas Surprise! (2008) (digital single)
- Quiet Talk (2021) (digital single)
- Center Of My Heart (2022) (digital single)

=== DVD / VHS ===
- [2006.02.22] m-flo – m-flo Tour 2005 Beat Space Nine at Nippon Budokan ("Taste Your Stuff," "Loop in My Heart," "tO yOUR bEAT," "Let Go")

=== Collaborations ===
- [2003.03.26] CM Style – Sony CM Tracks – "Jolie"
- [2004.11.17] m-flo – "Let Go"
- [2005.02.23] m-flo – "Dopamine" ("tO yOUR bEAT")
- [2005.07.13] m-flo – "Loop in My Heart / Hey!" ("Loop in My Heart"; "Let Go" (Reggae Disco Rockers Remix))
- [2005.08.24] m-flo – "Beat Space Nine" ("Loop in My Heart"; "tO yOUR bEAT"; "Let Go")
- [2005.11.02] m-flo – "Dope Space Nine" ("Loop in My Heart" (Home Grown Remix); "tO yOUR bEAT" (Gagle re-treatment remix); "Let Go" (Reggae Disco Rockers Remix))
- [2006.02.22] Tomita Lab – "Shiplaunching" (Shiawase no Blue [しあわせのBlue])
- [2006.05.24] Tommy Snyder – Kiraware Matsuko no Utatachi (Here, Always)
