= M-Flo =

Japanese hip hop group

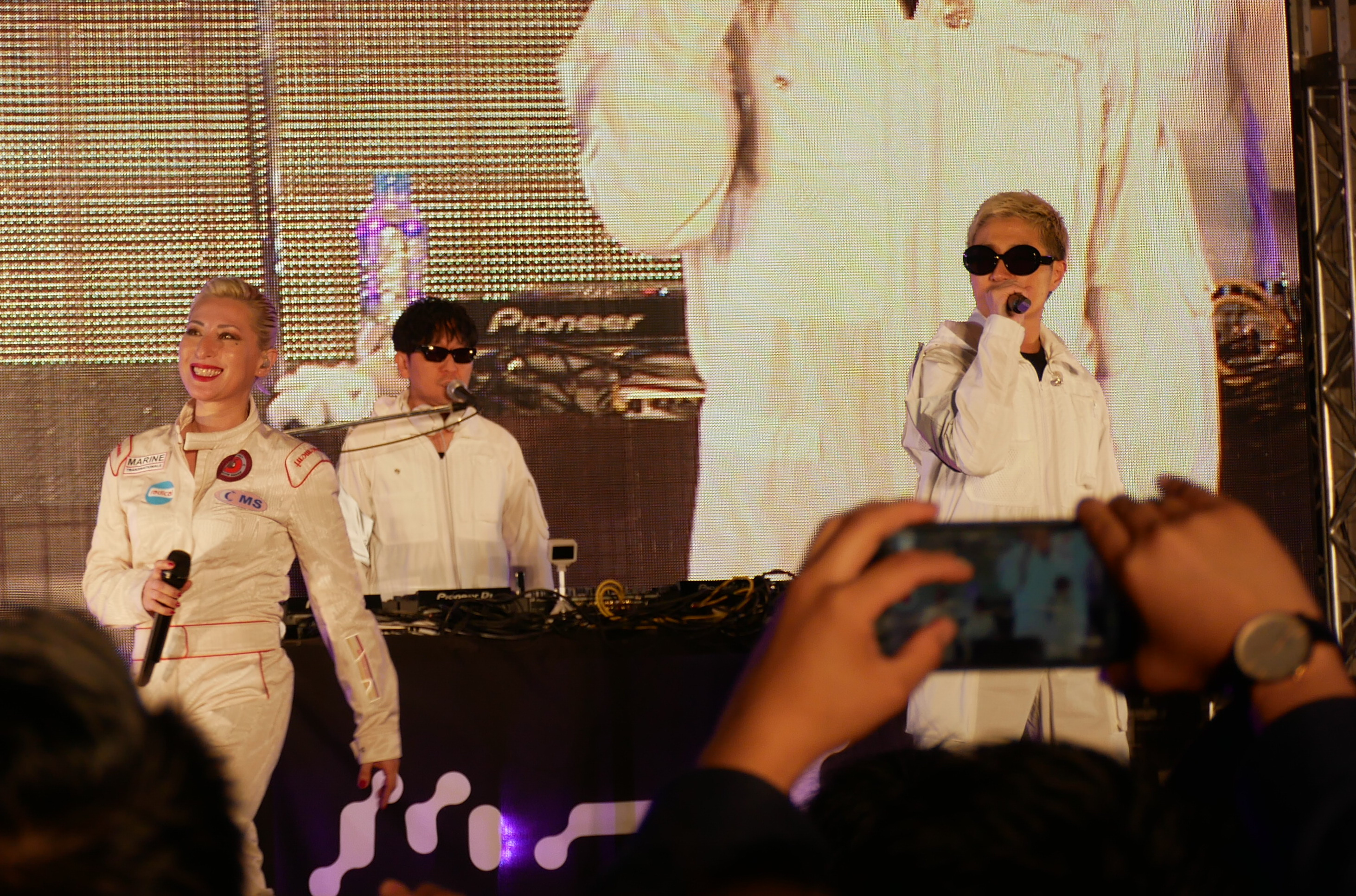
- M-Flo on stage, 2019

Background information
- Origin: Japan
- Genres: Hip-hop; nu jazz; lounge; techno; house
- Years active: 1997–present
- Label: Rhythm Zone
- Members: Taku Takahashi; Verbal; Lisa
- Website: m-flo.com

M-Flo (エムフロウ, Emu Furō; stylized as m-flo) is a Japanese hip-hop group consisting of Taku Takahashi, Verbal and Lisa.

Lisa left the group in 2002 to pursue a solo career and the remaining members then started the M-Flo Loves... project working different vocalists for each song over three albums, including the likes of Crystal Kay, Namie Amuro, Bonnie Pink, Koda Kumi and BoA.

Their success and acclaim established them as an influential hip-hop production team in Japan with success throughout Asia.

Taku Takahashi and Verbal also started successful side-projects outside M-Flo, such as the Teriyaki Boyz and Global Astro Alliance collaborating with international producers and artists such as Kanye West and the Beastie Boys.

In 2008, the group announced a hiatus, stating that each member would be focusing on their respective side projects. In 2012 the group ended their hiatus with the release of Square One on March 14, 2012.

On December 14, 2017, Lisa returned to the group and they announced that they will release new material in 2018. At the same time, M-Flo also released a digital compilation album called UNIVERSE to celebrate past years of the group, that contained all the 150 songs they released since their debut.

== History ==
=== Before M-Flo ===
Taku Takahashi (高橋 拓, Takahashi Taku) and Verbal (born as Ryu Young Gi [Korean: 류영기/유영기, Hanja: 柳榮起]) first met as students at St. Mary's International School in Tokyo. The pair collaborated in the group N.M.D., in which Takahashi was drummer and Verbal emceed, as well as throwing dance parties where they often performed together freestyle.

Following his high school graduation, Verbal attended Boston College and Gordon-Conwell Theological Seminary in Boston while Taku relocated to study in Los Angeles. They are both fluent in English and use it frequently in their songs. Following their return to Japan, the duo began performing in clubs and on television hoping to attract the attention of record companies. In 1998, Taku met Asakawa Masaji, the director of management company Artimage and DJ of the group GTS. Masaji invited Taku to produce a reworking of Barbra Streisand's The Way We Were, with a rap by Verbal, originally intended as a GTS release. The song was released on vinyl in 1998 on Avex Trax's Rhythm Republic indie imprint and later on the compilation album The Intergalactic Collection ~ギャラコレ~, and sold about 1000 units.

=== Forming M-Flo ===
Following the release of "The Way We Were", Verbal and Taku invited Elizabeth Sakura Narita, who with a Colombian background is better known by her stage name of LISA, a friend while at St. Mary's who at the time was performing under the pseudonym "Unika" solo and in several underground projects trying to gain credit as a musician, to collaborate with them on a second single, "Been So Long", released under the name Mediarite-Flow.

The name was a re-spelling of 'meteorite flow' as Verbal hoped the group would have a big impact in media and "surprise the unsuspecting masses with some good music." It was shortened by the group's label to "M-Flo". The song was released on a limited-run vinyl with Rhythm Republic in 1998, attracting the attention of the major Avex Trax sublabel Rhythm Zone.

=== 1999–2000: Planet Shining ===
The group's first release with Rhythm Zone, "The Tripod E.P.", was a double A-side single which included a re-release of "Been So Long" alongside new track "Flo Jack" and was released on July 7, 1999. The EP gained the group a #7 position on the Oricon charts, and "been so long" was licensed by Konami for inclusion in beatmania IIDX alongside the songs "The Rhyme Brokers" and "Theme from "flo-jack" ". A further four singles were released prior to the release of the group's first full-length album, Planet Shining, on February 23, 2000. The album reached #6 in the Oricon charts.

=== 2000–2002: Expo Expo, Lisa's departure ===
Following the release of the Planet Shining remix album The Replacement Percussionists in August 2000, the group released the first single from their second album, "How You Like Me Now?", on September 1, 2000. In January of the following year they released "Come Again", which achieved a #4 position in the Oricon charts and was their highest-selling single to date, selling 389,760 units, landing in the top 50 highest-selling singles in Japan for 2001. The group's second album, Expo Expo, was released on March 28, 2001, and reached #3 on the Oricon charts. Expo Expo was followed with a Japanese tour, released on CD and DVD in September 2001, and an album of remixes from Expo Expo, Expo Bouei Robot Gran Sonik, in November.

Following the release of Gran Sonik, Lisa announced her departure from the group to pursue a solo career in early 2002. The split was not amicable following an argument at a TV show shoot, though Verbal has stated that it was exaggerated and did not want her to leave. He described the group as "Guns N' Roses minus Axl Rose" at that time.

=== 2003–2009: M-Flo Loves... ===
After a period of inactivity, during which Verbal and Taku engaged themselves in a series of side-projects, M-Flo released a collection of collaborations entitled Sotoshigoto: m-flo Turns It Out! and on March 5, 2003 a fan-selected best of album, The Intergalactic Collection ~ギャラコレ~. The last track on the album hinted at the arrival of a new vocalist to replace Lisa, although the vocalist's identity was not revealed.

Inspired by The Neptunes, on June 6, 2003, the group released a pair of collaborations with R&B singer Crystal Kay, Reeewind! and I Like It. The singles were released under the names "M-Flo Loves Crystal Kay" and "Crystal Kay Loves M-Flo" respectively and both charted in the top 10, providing Crystal Kay with her highest-selling single to date. Reeewind! began a string of collaborations that spanned four years and three albums.

2004's Astromantic featured collaborations with top names in Japanese pop, jazz, R&B and electronica including Chemistry, Double and Ryuichi Sakamoto and rose to number 2 on the Oricon charts and to number 17 on the World Charts. The album was supported by a live DVD and remix album Astromantic Charm School. The album provided the group with its highest-selling single since "come again". The group's collaboration with Korean singer BoA, "the Love Bug", reached number 8 on Oricon charts.

The group released their follow-up album Beat Space Nine in 2005. The record featured a heavier electronic sound than the jazz-oriented Astromantic and included collaborations with Kahimi Karie and Akiko Wada. The album's final track, "Tripod Baby", included a cameo by former M-Flo vocalist Lisa. Beat Space Nine provided the group with their highest-selling album to date and their first Oricon #1. The album was supported by a live DVD and the remix album Dope Space Nine.

The third and final album in the M-Flo Loves series, Cosmicolor, was released on March 28, 2007. It included collaborations with Kumi Koda, Snacky Chan, Namie Amuro and Bonnie Pink, as well as a second collaboration with Crystal Kay, intended as a symbolic close to the M-Flo Loves... project. The album achieved a #2 Oricon position and was supported by a live DVD. A two-disc remix album, spanning remixes both from Cosmicolor and songs from M-Flo's previous four albums, ElectriColor, was released on September 26, 2007.

On February 13, 2008, the group released a collection of greatest hits from the M-Flo Loves... series, Award Supernova: Loves Best. The album debuted at #1 on the Oricon charts. It also featured a final new collaboration for the series, Love Comes and Goes, with Emi Hinouchi, Ryohei Yamamoto, Emyli, Yoshika, and Lisa.

Verbal has said that during the "M-Flo loves..." period "some vocalists that we thought were nice were hard to work with [because] that are very picky because they are used to controlling people." He singled out Akiko Wada as the most pleasantly surprising to work with.

In 2009, the group celebrated their tenth anniversary with two shows at Yoyogi National Stadium in Tokyo, capacity 13,000. The shows marked the end of the "M-Flo loves..." period and featured many special guests, including BoA and Crystal Kay.

=== 2011–2020: Reformation and Lisa's return ===
In September 2011, M-Flo performed at the Reebok event, Reethym of Lite. Here, they performed a new collaboration song with Reebok titled "RUN". The song features guest vocalist Minami from CREAM (Japanese group). On March 14, 2012 the first M-Flo album in five years Square One was released. The group has declined to comment on who will contribute vocals to the album.

On March 13, 2013, one year after Square One, M-Flo released their seventh studio album, Neven. The album includes the two singles, "Tonite" and "Lover" released on December 5, 2012 and February 6, 2013, and "Transformerz" which was composed as an opening theme for the Japanese broadcast of the television series Transformers: Prime. In early 2018, Lisa returned to the group, releasing "The Tripod E.P. 2", a sequel to their major debut "The Tripod E.P.". This marked their first release with Lisa in over 15 years. M-Flo performed the ending theme "against all gods" for the anime series Black Clover.

Their third full-length studio album with Lisa and ninth overall album Kyo was released on November 6, 2019. The m-flo loves series made its return March 6, 2020 with a compilation album of previous M-Flo loves songs and a new song titled "tell me tell me", featuring Sik-K, eill, and Taichi Mukai. That was followed up in June with RUN AWAYS featuring chelmico.

=== 2026: Superliminal ===
It was announced on January 9, 2025, that Arashi's Sho Sakurai would be included on the song "come again *Reloaded" in M-Flo's new "M-Flo loves..." series' album Superliminal, released on February 18. Other artists participating are Zico, chelmico, Diggy-MO', Shinoda Ryousuke, Rip Slyme, Sik-K, Electronicos Fantasticos!, N-choco, Mamiko Suzuki, Maya, eill and Adee A.,

On February 18, 2026, M-Flo released their tenth album Superliminal. The day following its release, M-Flo hosted "m-flo 25th ANNIVERSARY LIVE 'SUPERLIMINAL'" at Tokyo Garden Theater. They announced that after the February 19th performance, they will not be performing publicly "to search for new sounds, new encounters, and new inspirations to prepare ourselves for the next stage ahead." The original release of the album had a product defect that excluded Lisa's thank you credit and offered patrons to exchange their defective booklets.

=== Outside M-Flo ===
Both Verbal and Taku have headed up several side projects outside M-Flo. Verbal heads Rhythm Zone imprint, espionage records, where he produces all-girl Hip hop outfit Heartsdales and collaborates with Mic Banditz.

Taku also heads his own Rhythm Zone imprint, Tachytelic Records. He released an album of remixes by other artists, Tachytelic Night: Welcomes You to the Far East, in 2003. He also works with Ravex, a collaboration with fellow Avex DJs Tomoyuki Tanaka and Shinichi Osawa established to mark Avex's 20th anniversary. Their debut album, Trax, was released on April 24, 2009, following I Rave U and Believe in Love.

Verbal and Taku have both acted as sometime producers and collaborators for artists who came to prominence largely because of their participation in the M-Flo Loves series, including Emi Hinouchi, Yoshika, Emyli, Ryohei Yamamoto and Lisa. Since Astromantic, these artists have been collectively referred to as the Global Astro Alliance. In addition to the earlier Sotoshigoto: M-Flo Turns It Out!, Verbal and Taku have released three compilations of collaborations between M-Flo, the Global Astro Alliance, and other artists. The first, M-Flo Inside, was released in 2004 shortly before the first album in the series. The second, M-Flo Inside: Works Best II, was released on July 26, 2006. The third, M-Flo Inside: Works Best III, was released on March 19, 2009.

== Discography ==
- Planet Shining (2000)
- Expo Expo (2001)
- Astromantic (2004)
- Beat Space Nine (2005)
- Cosmicolor (2007)
- Square One (2012)
- Neven (2013)
- Future Is Wow (2014)
- Kyo (2019)
- Superliminal (2026)

== Video games ==
M-Flo has contributed to the video games industry by both providing songs for games, and by advertising for these games. For the first versions of the video game Beatmania IIDX, M-Flo has contributed short versions of the songs "L.O.T. (Love Or Truth)", "Mirrorball Satellite 2012", "The Theme from Flo Jack", "Been so Long", and "The Rhyme Brokers". Another music related video game, Dance Dance Revolution, featured the songs "The Theme from Flo Jack", "Been so Long", and "The Rhyme Brokers". Another song "Come Again" also appears on Reflec Beat, Jubeat, and Maimai.

A version of the track "Tripod Baby" (from the album Beat Space Nine) was re-released for the Shadow the Hedgehog video game that came out in November 2005. A commercial for the game, featuring Taku and Verbal, was also aired. Taku and Verbal are big fans of the character Shadow. The remix can be found on the Japanese iTunes version (as a bonus track) of the remix album, Dope Space Nine.

== Awards ==
Year	Award-Giving Body	Category	Work	Result
2004	Mnet Asian Music Awards	Best Asia Hip Hop Artist	—N/a	Won
2007	Space Shower Music Awards	Special Award	—N/a	Won
