= List of songs written by Lisa (Japanese musician, born 1974) =

This is an alphabetical list of the songs known to have been written or co-written by Lisa (Japanese musician, born 1974), known as a member of M-Flo.

Key
†	Indicates single release
#	Indicates promotional single release

Songs written by Lisa, with original artists, co-writers and originating album, showing year released.
Title	Artist(s)	Co-writer(s)	Originating album	Year	Ref.
"About My Friend"	R.J.W. meets Chica Colombiana	Hirofumi Asamoto	R.J.W. meets Chica Colombiana	1994	
"Alone"	Lisa		Disco Volante	2009	
"Angel"	Lisa featuring Zane	Zane; Eigo	Family	2012	
"Babel"	Los Kalibres & Lisa	Los Kalibres	IZM Will Never Die	2008	
"Babylon no Kiseki" (バビロンの奇跡, "Babylon Miracle") †	Lisa		Juicy Music	2002	
"Back Stage Pass"	Cliff Edge featuring Lisa	Jun; Shun; DJ Georgia	For You	2010	
"Bad Men!"	Lisa	Verbal; Taku Takahashi	Ready to Disco	2008	
"Been So Long" †	M-Flo	Verbal; Taku Takahashi	The Tripod E.P.	1998	
"Believe, Believe"	Lisa		Gratitude	2004	
"Believe the Light" †	Triceratops with Lisa	Shō Wada	Triceratops Greatest 1997-2001	2001	
"Best Wishes"	Lisa		"Superstar" (single)	2003	
"Bootylectric"	Lisa		God Sista	2006	
"Boy Crazy"	Lisa		Elizabeth	2006	
"Brain-Spill"	M-Flo	Verbal; Taku Takahashi	"How You Like Me Now?" (single)	2000	
"Break Free"	Maiko Nakamura featuring Lisa	Maiko Nakamura; Daisuke Imai	Answer	2011	
"Break Free"	Sound Around featuring Lisa & Ryohei	Ryohei; Eiichiro Ishizuka	Every with You	2009	
"Brightest"	NEWS	Taku Takahashi	Neverland	2017	
"Brilliant Star"	Lisa	Satoshi Hidaka; Gee	"Showtime" (single)	2006	
"Chica Locita"	R.J.W. meets Chica Colombiana	Hirofumi Asamoto	R.J.W. meets Chica Colombiana	1994	
"Chronopsychology" †	M-Flo	Verbal; Taku Takahashi	Planet Shining	1999	
"City Rock"	TeddyLoid featuring Debra Zeer	TeddyLoid	Panty & Stocking with Garterbelt Soundtrack	2010	
"City Streets"	R.J.W. meets Chica Colombiana	Hirofumi Asamoto	R.J.W. meets Chica Colombiana	1994	
"Color" #	Lisa	Satoshi Hidaka	Family	2011	
"Come Again" †	M-Flo	Verbal; Taku Takahashi	Expo Expo	2001	
"Come Back to Me" †	M-Flo	Verbal; Taku Takahashi	Planet Shining	2000	
"Crave"	Lisa		Ready to Disco	2008	
"Deep Within"	M-Flo	Verbal; Taku Takahashi	Planet Shining	1999	
"Dispatch" †	M-Flo featuring Dev Large, Nipps & Vincent Galluo	Dev Large; Nipps; Verbal; Taku Takahashi	Expo Expo	2001	
"Do Yo Thing"	Lisa		Elizabeth	2006	
"Eien" (永遠, "Forever")	Lisa		Gratitude	2004	
"Expo Expo"	M-Flo featuring Towa Tei, Bahamadia & CHOPS	CHOPS; Verbal; Taku Takahashi	Expo Expo	2001	
"Fallen Angel"	Mitsunori Ikeda featuring Aimee B.	Mitsunori Ikeda	Panty & Stocking with Garterbelt Soundtrack	2010	
"Falling for You..." #	Lisa featuring Verbal (M-Flo)	Verbal	Disco Volante	2009	
"Family"	Lisa		Family	2012	
"Fire Woo Foo Foo"	Diggy-MO' featuring Lisa	Diggy-Mo'; Satoshi Hidaka	Diggyism	2009	
"Flo Jack" †	M-Flo	Verbal; Taku Takahashi	The Tripod E.P.	1999	
"Frozen"	Lisa		Disco Volante	2009	
"Galaxy"	Lisa		Juicy Music	2003	
"Game of Cosmetics"	Lisa & Taku Takahashi	Taku Takahashi	Hito wa Mitame ga 100 Percent Original Soundtrack	2017	
"Get Real"	Lisa	Daisuke Imai	Gratitude	2004	
"Goal Get Daisakusen (Vamos hacer el gol!)" (ゴール・ゲット大作戦, "Let's Get the Goal!") †	Lisa	Kaori Moriwaka; Hirofumi Asamoto	—	1994	
"God Sista"	Lisa		God Sista	2006	
"Going to the Sky" †	Jafrosax featuring Lisa	Kazuki Katsuta	Expo Expo	2003	
"Goodies"	Ajapai featuring Lisa	T. Mori	Unaffected	2006	
"Gracias a Dios" ("Thanks God")	Lisa		Gratitude	2004	
"Gypsy Woman"	Lisa		Kaze no Ongaku: Radiating from an N.G.O	2005	
"Hands" †	M-Flo	Verbal; Taku Takahashi	Planet Shining	2000	
"Hit da Spot"	Lisa		God Sista	2006	
"Hot Love"	Lisa		Got that Fever	2008	
"House Nation" #	Ravex featuring Lisa	Shinichi Osawa; Tomoyuki Tanaka; Taku Takahashi	Trax	2009	
"How You Like Me Now?" †	M-Flo	Verbal; Taku Takahashi	Expo Expo	2000	
"I Am Pop"	Lisa featuring Lisa Lion		Gratitude	2004	
"Ienakute mo..." (言えなくても…, "Even If I Can't Say It")	Lisa		"Babylon no Kiseki" (single)	2002	
"Ikenai Onna" (イケナイ女, "Bad Girl")	Lisa		"I'm All You" (single)	2002	
"I'm All You" †	Lisa		Juicy Music	2002	
"I Miss Your Love"	Lisa		99% Radio Show	2003	
"Inspiration"	Lisa		Juicy Music	2003	
"I Promise"	Lisa		Juicy Music	2003	
"I, Rhythm" †	Lisa		Elizabeth	2005	
"It's On" #	Lisa		God Sista	2006	
"It's You"	NEWS	Sakura; Taku Takahashi	Epcotia	2018	
"Jūnana-sai - Furyō" (十七歳-不良, "Seventeen Years Old" Delinquent")	Lisa		Kaze no Ongaku: Radiating from an N.G.O	2005	
"Just a Story of a Woman"	Blue on Blue	Michihiro Nakamura; Nobuo Shikata	Mini	1998	
"Just Be"	M-Flo	Verbal; Taku Takahashi	Planet Shining	1999	
"Kibō (Hope)" (希望(HOPE))	Lisa		Kaze no Ongaku: Radiating from an N.G.O	2005	
"Komoriuta o Kudasai (Sing Me a Lullaby)" (子守唄をください(SING ME A LULLABY))	Lisa		Kaze no Ongaku: Radiating from an N.G.O	2005	
"Kono Inochi (This Life)" (この命(THIS LIFE))	Lisa		Kaze no Ongaku: Radiating from an N.G.O	2005	
"Leave" #	Lisa	Christian Karlsson	Got that Fever	2008	
"Let Me Cry"	Lisa		Juicy Music	2003	
"Lies" †	M-Flo	Verbal; Taku Takahashi	—	2001	
"Lonely"	Lisa		Elizabeth	2006	
"L.O.T. (Love or Truth)" †	M-Flo	H.U.B.; Verbal; Taku Takahashi	Planet Shining	1999	
"Love"	Blue on Blue	Michihiro Nakamura; Nobuo Shikata	Mini	1998	
"Love"	Lisa		Disco Volante	2009	
"Love Can't Wait" †	DJ Hasebe featuring Lisa	DJ Hasebe	Tail of Old Nick	2001	
"Love Comes and Goes" #	M-Flo loves Emi Hinouchi, Ryohei, Emyli, Lisa and Yoshika	Verbal; Taku Takahashi; Emi Hinouchi; Ryohei; Emyli; Yoshika	Award Supernova: Loves Best	2008	
"Love Song"	Lisa	Sadahiro Nakano	Ready to Disco	2008	
"Magenta Rain"	M-Flo featuring Umjanna	Verbal; Taku Takahashi	Expo Expo	2001	
"Magic"	Koda Kumi featuring Lisa	Ken Matsubara	Feel My Mind	2004	
"Make It Break It"	M-Flo	Verbal; Taku Takahashi	The Tripod E.P. 2	2018	
"Matador de Corazon"	Los Kalibres featuring Lisa	Los Kalibres; Guilia; 193 Reggaeton	De Japon Pa'l Mundo	2006	
"Memory"	Lisa		"I, Rhythm" (single)	2005	
"Mindstate"	M-Flo	Verbal; Taku Takahashi	The Tripod E.P.	1999	
"Mirrorball Satellite 2012" †	M-Flo	H.U.B.; Verbal; Taku Takahashi	—	1999	
"Move On" †	Lisa		Juicy Music	2002	
"My Dearest" †	Lisa		Gratitude	2004	
"My One Star" #	Makai featuring Lisa	Masanobu Komba	Trax	2009	
"Natural Color"	Lisa		Juicy Music	2003	
"Natural Human Being"	Lisa		"One World" (single)	1994	
"Neoege Ssunun Pyonji Part 2" (너에게 쓰는 편지 Part 2)	MC Mong featuring Lisa	Kim Keon-woo; MC Mong	The Way I Am	2006	
"New Days" #	Lisa	Aili	Family	2012	
"Never" #	M-Flo	Verbal; Taku Takahashi	The Tripod E.P. 2	2018	
"Never Alone"	Lisa	Ryuichiro Yamaki	Family	2012	
"No Question" #	M-Flo	Verbal; Taku Takahashi; Vincent Montana Jr.	The Tripod E.P. 2	2018	
"One"	Koda Kumi	Koda Kumi	Grow into One	2002	
"One Sugar Dream"	M-Flo	Verbal; Taku Takahashi	The Quantum EP	2000	
"One More Song"	Lisa		Got that Fever	2008	
"One World" †	Lisa		—	1994	
"Only If" †	Lisa		Only If: Diamonds in the Snow E.P.	2004	
"On the Lockdown"	Lisa		Elizabeth	2006	
"Orbit-3" †	M-Flo	Verbal; Taku Takahashi; Jimmy Castor; John Pruitt; Gerry Thomas	Expo Expo	2001	
"Other Side of Now"	Lisa		Got that Fever	2008	
"Ouch!"	Lisa		Elizabeth	2006	
"Pages..."	Lisa	Ryuichiro Yamaki	Family	2012	
"Peace in Love" †	Lisa		Gratitude	2003	
"Pearl Moon"	Koda Kumi	Ken Matsubara	Grow into One	2003	
"Planet Love"	Lisa		House Nation - Beach '09	2009	
"Planet Shining"	M-Flo	Verbal; Taku Takahashi	Planet Shining	1999	
"Precious Message"	Lisa & Maine	Mine; Shin Hashimoto	Backdancers! Original Soundtrack	2006	
"Prism" †	M-Flo	Verbal; Taku Takahashi	Expo Expo	2001	
"Remember Me"	Lisa		Gratitude	2004	
"Rinne (Reincarnation)" (輪廻(REINCARNATION))	Lisa		Kaze no Ongaku: Radiating from an N.G.O	2005	
"Round & Round"	Kenshin featuring Lisa	Kenshin; DJ Kou-G	Pop Korn Magic	2006	
"Saywhatchugatta"	M-Flo	Verbal; Taku Takahashi	Planet Shining	1999	
"Sea of the Stars" †	Lisa	Shin Kawabe	—	1994	
"Send My Heart" #	Lisa		Ready to Disco	2008	
"Shake My Heart"	Lisa		Disco Volante	2009	
"Shake Your Body Down"	Lisa		"Out of Cry" (single)	1993	
"Showtime" †	Lisa		Elizabeth	2006	
"Smile Again" #	Lisa featuring Jamosa		Family	2012	
"So Beautiful" †	Lisa		Gratitude	2004	
"So Bright"	Yummy featuring Lisa	Yummy; Igoda	D.I.S.K.	2010	
"Sound Boy Thriller" #	M-Flo feeeeeeeeeeat. Lisa	Verbal; Taku Takahashi	MF10: 10th Anniversary Best	2009	
"So You Say"	M-Flo	Lili; Verbal; Taku Takahashi	"Hands" (single)	2000	
"Special Love"	Lisa		God Sista	2006	
"Stay, Forever"	Lisa		Elizabeth	2006	
"Summer Story"	Lisa featuring Butcher		Ready to Disco	2008	
"Superstar" †	Lisa		Juicy Music	2002	
"Sweetest"	Jhett featuring Lisa	Yakko	Jhett	2005	
"Sweet Rishi Boy"	Anna Tsuchiya	Taku Takahashi	"Brave Vibration" (single)	2009	
"Switch" †	Lisa featuring Koda Kumi & Heartsdales	Heartsdales; Ryuichiro Yamaki	Gratitude	2004	
"Ten Below Blazing"	M-Flo	Verbal; Taku Takahashi	Planet Shining	1999	
"The Bandwagon"	M-Flo	Verbal; Taku Takahashi	Expo Expo	2001	
"The Shwing"	Lisa featuring Dabo	Dabo	Juicy Music	2003	
"The Sign"	Lisa		Got that Fever	2008	
"Thoughts of You"	Lisa	Ryuichiro Yamaki	"Tomorrow" (single)	2007	
"Time"	R.J.W. meets Chica Colombiana	Hirofumi Asamoto	R.J.W. meets Chica Colombiana	1994	
"Tomodachi ni Narō" (友だちになろう, "Let's Be Friends")	Lisa		Kaze no Ongaku: Radiating from an N.G.O	2005	
"Tomorrow" †	Lisa		Lisabest: Mission on Earth 9307	2007	
"Too Much Sense"	M-Flo	Verbal; Taku Takahashi	"Mirrorball Satellite 2012" (single)	1999	
"Traveler"	Lisa		Disco Volante	2009	
"Tripod Baby" #	M-Flo loves Lisa	Verbal; Taku Takahashi	Beat Space Nine	2005	
"Unchained Tribe"	Lisa & Miss Monday	Controller; Hieda; Miss Monday	Tokyo Ragga Blaze	2009	
"Quantum Leap" †	M-Flo	Verbal; Taku Takahashi	Planet Shining	2000	
"Voice of Love (Ue o Muite Arukō)" (上を向いて歩こう, "Walk While Looking Up") †	Voice of Love Posse	Ai; Bennie K; Emyli; Full of Harmony; Hi-D; Daisuke Imai; LL Brothers; Lena Park; Michico; Tina; DJ Kaori; Tionne Watkins; Zeebra	—	2003	
"We Ride"	Lisa		God Sista	2006	
"What It Is"	M-Flo	Verbal; Taku Takahashi	Expo Expo	2001	
"Where Peace Belongs"	Lisa	James Capes! Capers	"Move On" (single)	2002	
"Winter Sky"	Lisa		Family	2012	
"www.~World Wide Wisteria~"	Kyoko collaboration with Lisa	Kyoko; Hisashi Nawata	Justess	2010	
"You Said." †	Blue on Blue featuring Lisa	Lili; Michihiro Nakamura	Touch of Truth	2000	
"Your Birthday" #	Lisa		Family	2011	
"Yours Only" †	M-Flo	Verbal; Taku Takahashi	Expo Expo	2001	
