= Lisa (Japanese musician, born 1974) discography =

Lisa discography
- Studio albums: 9
- EPs: 2
- Compilation albums: 2
- Singles: 33

The solo discography of Lisa contains 9 studio albums, 2 compilation albums, 2 extended plays and 33 singles.

== Studio albums ==
List of albums, with selected chart positions
Title	Album details	Peak positions
Title	Album details	JPN Oricon (Note: Sources for additional chart positions are as follows: Juicy Music, Gratitude, Melody Circus, "Move On", "Babylon no Kiseki", "I'm All You", "Superstar", "Peace in Love", "My Dearest", "Switch", "So Beautiful", "Only If", "Believe the Light", "Love Can't Wait", "Nee-D (Lady)", "Voice of Love (Ue o Muite Arukō)", "Shiawase ni Narō yo '04".)
Juicy Music	Released: April 16, 2003; Label: Rhythm Zone; Formats: CD, digital download	5
Gratitude	Released: June 30, 2004; Label: Rhythm Zone; Formats: 2CD, digital download	19
Melody Circus	1980s acoustic covers album; Released: April 20, 2005; Label: Rhythm Zone; Formats: CD, CD/DVD, digital download	79
God Sista	R&B concept album; Released: March 23, 2006; Label: Rhythm Zone; Formats: CD, CD/DVD, digital download	98
Elizabeth	Released: October 25, 2006; Label: Rhythm Zone; Formats: CD, digital download	60
Disco Volante	Released: November 11, 2009; Label: Rhythm Zone; Formats: CD, digital download	146
Family	Released: May 16, 2012; Label: Rhythm Zone; Formats: CD, digital download	—
"—" denotes items which did not chart, or were released before the creation of a chart.

== Collaborative albums ==
List of albums, with selected chart positions
Title	Album details
R.J.W Meets Chica Colombiana	Collaboration album with Ram Jam World; Released: March 21, 1994; Label: Stork; Formats: CD
Avex Nico presents Kid's Songs Vol. 1	Children's music album, produced by Taku Takahashi for the Avex Nico project; Released: April 27, 2016; Label: Avex Nico, Aspeq; Formats: CD, digital download

== Compilation albums ==
List of albums, with selected chart positions
Title	Album details	Peak positions
Title	Album details	JPN Oricon
Kaze no Ongaku: Radiating from an N.G.O (かぜのおんがく, "Music of the Wind")	Released: July 27, 2005; Label: Tokuma; Formats: CD	—
Lisabest: Mission on Earth 9307	Released: June 6, 2007; Label: Rhythm Zone; Formats: 2CD, 2CD/DVD, digital download	28
"—" denotes items which did not chart.

== Extended plays ==
List of albums, with selected chart positions
Title	Album details	Peak positions
Title	Album details	JPN Oricon
Ready to Disco	Released: February 20, 2008; Label: Rhythm Zone; Formats: CD/DVD, digital download	173
Got that Fever	Released: August 27, 2008; Label: Rhythm Zone; Formats: CD, CD/DVD, digital download	—
"—" denotes items which did not chart.

== Singles ==
=== As lead artist ===
List of singles, with selected chart positions
Title	Year	Peak chart positions	Album
Title	Year	JPN Oricon	Album
"Out of Cry"	1993	—	Non-album singles
"One World"	1994	—	Non-album singles
"Sea of the Stars"	1994	—	Non-album singles
"Goal Get Daisakusen (Vamos hacer el gol!)" (ゴール・ゲット大作戦, "Let's Get the Goal!")	1994	—	Non-album singles
"Move On"	2002	7	Juicy Music
"Babylon no Kiseki" (バビロンの奇跡, "Babylon Miracle")	2002	31	Juicy Music
"I'm All You"	2002	26	Juicy Music
"Superstar"	2003	127	Juicy Music
"Peace in Love" (Note: Marketed as Flower for the Lion E.P.: Peace in Love.)	2003	135	Gratitude
"My Dearest"	2004	90	Gratitude
"Switch" (featuring Koda Kumi & Heartsdales)	2004	43	Gratitude
"I Only Want to Be with You"	2004	43	Gratitude
"So Beautiful"	2004	156	Gratitude
"Only If" (Note: Marketed as Only If: Diamonds in the Snow E.P..)	2004	133	Non-album single
"I, Rhythm"	2005	94	Elizabeth
"Showtime"	2006	199	Elizabeth
"Tomorrow"	2007	—	Lisabest: Mission on Earth 9307
"—" denotes items which did not chart.

=== As featured artist ===
List of singles and promotional singles, with selected chart positions
Title	Year	Peak chart positions		Album
Title	Year	JPN Oricon	JPN Billboard (Note: Sources for chart positions are as follows: "Love Comes and Goes"; "Sound Boy Thriller")	Album
"Melody" (Note: Featured on Rough and Ready as the song's English version, "Planet Earth".) (Ram Jam World featuring Lisa)	1997	—	—	Rough and Ready
"Salvia" (Ram Jam World featuring Lisa)	1998	—	—	Non-album single
"You Said" (Blue on Blue featuring Lisa)	2000	—	—	Touch of Truth
"One Wish" (Blue on Blue featuring Lisa)	2000	—	—	Touch of Truth
"Believe the Light" (Triceratops with Lisa)	2001	14	—	Triceratops Greatest 1997-2001
"Love Can't Wait" (DJ Hasebe with Lisa)	2001	70	—	Tail of Old Nick
"Nee-D (Lady)" (ねぇD (Lady)) (Dabo featuring Lisa)	2002	147	—	Hitman
"Going to the Sky" (Jafrosax featuring Lisa)	2003	—	—	Jafrosax
"Voice of Love (Ue o Muite Arukō)" (上を向いて歩こう, "Walk While Looking Up") (among Voice of Love Posse)	2003	25	—	Non-album single
"Shiawase ni Narō yo '04" (しあわせになろうよ'04, "Let's Be Happy '04") (among Tsuyoshi Nagabuchi & All Cast featuring Zeebra)	2004	24	—	Nagabuchi Tsuyoshi Tribute Album: Hey Aniki!
"Tripod Baby" (M-Flo loves Lisa)	2005	—	—	Beat Space Nine
"Love Comes and Goes" (M-Flo loves Emi Hinouchi, Ryohei, Emyli, Lisa and Yoshika)	2008	—	43	Award Supernova: Loves Best
"House Nation" (Ravex featuring Lisa)	2008	—	—	Trax
"My One Star" (Makai featuring Lisa)	2008	—	—	Stars
"Stop!" (R.Yamaki Produce Project featuring Lisa)	2009	—	—	Non-album single
"Sound Boy Thriller" (M-Flo feeeeeeeeeeat. Lisa)	2009	—	22	MF10: 10th Anniversary Best
"Only You" (Firework DJs mix Lisa)	2011	—	—	Non-album single
"—" denotes items which did not chart, were released before the creation of the Billboard Japan Hot 100.

=== Promotional singles ===
List of singles, with selected chart positions
Title	Year	Peak chart positions	Album
Title	Year	JPN Billboard Adult (Note: Sources for chart positions are as follows: "Falling for You...".)	Album
"Eternal Flame"	2005	—	Melody Circus
"It's On"	2006	—	God Sista
"Send My Heart"	2008	—	Ready to Disco
"Leave"	2008	—	Got that Fever
"Falling for You..." (featuring Verbal (M-Flo))	2009	51	Disco Volante
"Color"	2011	—	Family
"Your Birthday"	2011	—	Family
"New Days"	2012	—	Family
"Hitomi o Tojite" (with Kotaro Oshio)	2012	—	Family
"Smile Again" (featuring Jamosa)	2012	—	Family
"—" denotes items which did not chart, were released before the creation of the Billboard Japan Hot 100.

== Video albums ==
List of albums, with selected chart positions
Title	Album details
Kaze no Ongaku Live (かぜのおんがくライブ)	Released: June 14, 2006; Label: Tokuma; Formats: DVD

== Guest appearances ==
The following songs are not singles or promotional singles and have not appeared on an album by Lisa.

Title	Year	Other artists	Album
"Planet Earth"	1997	Ram Jam World	Planet Earth
"Corazon"	1997	Ram Jam World	Planet Earth
"Just a Story of a Woman"	1998	Blue on Blue	Mini
"Love" (Note: A later Japanese version, "One Wish", was released on a single.)	1998	Blue on Blue	Mini
"Yokubō" (欲望, "Desire")	1998	Ram Jam World	Sekai
"The End of the World"	1998	Ram Jam World	Sekai
"Skelton"	1999	Ram Jam World	"Usotsuki na Hadaka" (single)
"Little Wish" (background vocals)	1999	K.	Kaleidolife
"Make Me Crazy" (background vocals)	1999	Kirari	Kirariddim
"Mind Kids" (background vocals)	1999	Kirari	Kirariddim
"Kokoro Yasumete" (心やすめて, "Take a Break from My Heart") (background vocals)	2000	Kirari	Kirariddim
"Perfect Love... Gone Wrong (Lisa M-Flo Mix)"	2000	Sting	Brand New Day: The Remixes
"Freak Me"	2000	Joi	"Freak Me" (single)
"Reality" (リアリティ) (background vocals)	2001	Yumi Matsutoya	Acacia
"I Can't Tell You Anymore"	2001	Triceratops	"Believe the Light" (single)
"Rest of Everything"	2001	Yukihiro Fukutomi	Timeless
"All Mine" (background vocals)	2002	Heartsdales	Radioactive
"It Takes Two (Octopussy Remix feat. Lisa)"	2003	Chemistry, Octopussy	Brand New Day: The Remixes
"Flower (D.I's "Luv hurts" Remix) feat. Lisa"	2003	BoA, Daisuke Imai	Next World
"Why Do Fools Fall in Love"	2003	—	Dress Up: Avex Cover Songs Collection
"Gozen 3-ji no OP (3 A.M. OP)" (午前3時のオプ(3 a.m.op))	2003	—	Tribute to Flipper's Guitar: Friend Again
"Lucky Star"	2003	GTS	This Is Cover Hits?: Disukaba
"Tombo" (とんぼ, "Dragonfly")	2004	Home Grown	Nagabuchi Tsuyoshi Tribute Album: Hey Aniki!
"Going to the Sky [Kantaro Takizawa Remix]"	2004	Jafrosax, Kantaro Takizawa	Jafrosax Remix
"At the Dance"	2004	Home Grown	Time Is Reggae
"Eternal Flame"	2005	—	Eternal Sunshine of the Spotless Mind (Original Soundtrack - Japanese Edition)
"Sweetest"	2005	Jhett	Jhett
"Best of My Love"	2005	—	We Dance Classics Vol. 1
"Sweetest Dub"	2005	Jhett, Sai Genji	Jhett Black
"Tripod Baby (Shinichi Osawa Remix)"	2005	M-Flo, Shinichi Osawa	Dope Space Nine
"Round & Round"	2006	Kenshin	Pop Korn Magic
"Goodies"	2006	Ajapai	Unaffected
"Matador de Corazon"	2006	Los Kalibres	De Japon Pa'l Mundo
"Letter to You Part 2" (너에게 쓰는 편지 Part 2 Neoege Ssunun Pyonji)	2006	MC Mong	The Way I Am
"Anata ni Aitakute (Missing You)" (あなたに逢いたくて〜Missing You〜)	2006	—	Jewel Songs: Seiko Matsuda Tribute & Covers
"ReListen"	2007	Ryohei	ReListen
"Unchained Tribe"	2007	Miss Monday	Tokyo Ragga Blaze
"Be the Man"	2007	—	Tribute to Celine Dion
"Babel"	2008	Los Kalibres	IZM Will Never Die
"Beatles ga Oshiete Kureta" (ビートルズが教えてくれた, "The Beatles Taught Me")	2008	—	Yoshida Takuro Tribute: Kekkon Shiyō yo
"I Like It"	2008	—	Cotton Garden
"Fire Woo Foo Foo"	2009	Diggy-MO'	Diggyism
"I Believe in Miracles"	2009	Makai	Legend
"Planet Love (Pink Chameleons English Version)"	2009	Pink Chameleons	House Nation - Beach '09
"Break Free"	2009	Sound Around, Ryohei	Every with You
"Broken Umbrella" (버려진 우산 Beoryeojin Usan)	2009	Epik High, Planet Shiver	Remixing the Human Soul
"Back Stage Pass"	2010	Cliff Edge	For You
"So Bright"	2010	Yummy	D.I.S.K.
"Been So Long"	2010	JYJ	Thanksgiving Live in Dome
"www.~World Wide Wisteria~"	2010	Kyoko	Justess
"Break Free"	2011	Maiko Nakamura	Answer
"You Gotta Be"	2012	Jamosa	Best of My Luv: Collabo Selection
"Game of Cosmetics"	2017	Taku Takahashi	Hito wa Mitame ga 100 Percent Original Soundtrack
