= Melody Circus =

Studio album by LISA
- Released: May 20, 2005
- Recorded: 2004–2005
- Genre: R&B; pop
- Language: Japanese
- Label: Avex Trax, Rhythm Zone

LISA chronology
Gratitude (2004)	Melody Circus (2005)	Kaze no Ongaku: Radiating from an N.G.O (2005)

Professional ratings
Review scores
Source	Rating
HMV	3.5/5 stars

Melody Circus (stylized as MELODY CIRCUS) is LISA's third studio album, released on May 20, 2005. It contains covers of 1980s English songs.

== Background information ==
Melody Circus is a covers album that was released a year after her last album, Gratitude, in May 2005. The album debuted low on the Oricon Albums Charts at #71 and remained on the charts for five weeks, shifting 6,700 units. The album is a collection of acoustic covers by American artists who LISA has said she has enjoyed.

The album was released in both CD and CD+DVD editions, with the DVD housing every music video she had released up until the album's release, along with two of the songs she performed acoustically during her 2004 performance at Sumida Triphony Hall.

Her cover version of The Bangles' song "Eternal Flame" was used as the promotional song for Japan's release of the film Eternal Sunshine of the Spotless Mind. It was also placed on the Japanese edition of the film's official soundtrack.

== Track listing ==
CD
No.	Title	Lyrics	Original artist	Length
1.	"Eternal Flame"	Billy Steinberg • Susanna Hoffs • Tom Kelly	The Bangles
2.	"You Got It All"	Rupert Holmes	The Jets
3.	"Cherish"	Madonna • Patrick Leonard	Madonna
4.	"Against All Odds (Take a Look at Me Now)"	Phil Collins	Phil Collins
5.	"Heaven"	Bryan Adams • Jim Vallance	Bryan Adams
6.	"Kissing A Fool"	George Michael	George Michael
7.	"Time After Time"	Cyndi Lauper • Rob Hyman	Cyndi Lauper
8.	"Coffee and Starfish~Raspberry Beret"	Prince	Prince • The Revolution
9.	"Saving All My Love For You"	Michael Masser • Gerry Goffin	Whitney Houston
10.	"Every Breath You Take"	Sting	The Police

DVD
No.	Title	Length
1.	"Move On" (Music Video)
2.	"Babylon no Kiseki" (Music Video)
3.	"I'm All You" (Music Video)
4.	"Superstar" (Music Video)
5.	"Peace in Love" (Music Video)
6.	"My Dearest" (Music Video)
7.	"Switch feat. Koda Kumi & Heartsdales" (Music Video)
8.	"So Beautiful" (Music Video)
9.	"'04 Acoustic Lives @Sumida Triphony Hall" (アコースティック・ライヴ映像)
