= Lisa discography =

Lisa discography may refer to:

- Lisa (Japanese musician, born 1974) discography
- Lisa (Japanese musician, born 1987) discography
- Lisa (rapper) discography
- Lisa (South Korean singer) § Discography
