= God Sista =

Studio album by LISA
- Released: March 23, 2006
- Recorded: 2005–2006
- Genre: R&B; pop
- Language: Japanese
- Label: Avex, Rhythm Zone; RZCD-45347 (Japan, CD); RZCD-45346 (Japan, CD+DVD)

LISA chronology
Kaze no Ongaku: Radiating from an N.G.O (2005)	God Sista (2006)	Elizabeth (2006)

God Sista (stylized as GOD SISTA) is LISA's first concept album and fifth overall album. It was released nearly a year after her last album, Kaze no Ongaku 〜Radiating from an N.G.O.〜 (かぜのおんがく / Music of the Wind), though the latter album had been released by her previous record label Tokuma Japan Communications. The album charted at No. 90 on the Oricon Albums Charts and remained on the charts for five weeks. The album has sold 7,653 copies.

== Background information ==
God Sista is Japanese R&B artist LISA's first concept album. It peaked at No. 90 on the Oricon charts, but dropped in rank to take No. 98 for the week, only staying on the charts for five weeks. During its run, it sold 7,653 copies.

The album was split up into "acts," and consisted of remixes and standard tracks, including a remix of "Switch," which featured singer-songwriter Koda Kumi and the duo Heartsdales. The remix was composed by DJ Watarai, who had also worked with duo Soulhead for their song "Too Late" from their Re-Construct Album Vol.1 Reflection remix album. Another remix placed on the album was "Sweetest," which was originally by JHETT a.k.a. YAKKO for AQUARIUS and featured LISA. The track "It's On" was used as the album's main promotional track and was even given a music video on the limited CD+DVD editions of the album.

For the album, LISA recorded a new rendition of the song "Come Back To Me ~reviens moi~," which she had performed with VERBAL and Taku Takahashi during her time with m-flo in April 2000.

== Track listing ==
CD
No.	Title	Music	Length
1.	"Act 1: It's On"	Ryosuke Imai	4:14
2.	"Act 1: God Sista"	STARWAX	4:51
3.	"Act 1: hit da spot"	Angelo Arce	4:57
4.	"Act 1: Special Love"	Nao'ymt	5:08
5.	"Act 1: bootylectric"	Steven "Lenky" Marsden	3:11
6.	"Act 1: We Ride"	Eric "Coptic" Matlock	4:22
7.	"Act 1: I, Rhythm" (LOS KALIBRES RAGGAETON REMIX)	LOS KALIBRES	3:59
8.	"Act 1: Come Back To Me" (7 Winsor Avenue Kingston 5)	HASE-T	5:05
9.	"Act 2: I Promise"	LISA	5:12
10.	"Act 2: Sweetest feat. LISA" (Original by JHETT a.k.a. YAKKO for AQUARIUS)	YAKKO	3:46
11.	"Act 2: Get Real"	LISA	3:50
12.	"Act 2: Remember me"	LISA	5:37
13.	"Act 2: Switch feat. Koda Kumi & Heartsdales" (DJ WATARAI REMIX)	DJ WATARAI	5:35

DVD
No.	Title	Length
1.	"move on" (Music Video)
2.	"It's On" (Music Video)
3.	"I, Rhythm" (Music Video)
4.	"I'm all you" (ARTIMAGE NIGHT 2005@Studio Coast)
5.	"move on" (ARTIMAGE NIGHT 2005@Studio Coast)
6.	"memory" (ARTIMAGE NIGHT 2005@Studio Coast)
7.	"I, Rhythm" (ARTIMAGE NIGHT 2005@Studio Coast)
8.	"Switch feat. Koda Kumi & Hearstdales" (Music Video)
