= Krysta Gonzales =

American playwright

Krysta Gonzales is a Black American and Mexican American playwright and actress based in Los Angeles, California. She is best known for her 2015 play, Robin Hood: An Elegy.

== Career ==
Gonzales identifies as Black and Latina and cites political motivations for her work. Gonzales received a Bachelor of Fine Arts from NYU-Tisch School of the Arts. She has been interested in art promoting people of color since age thirteen.

Gonzales was listed as one of the 50PP's Best Unproduced Latin@ Plays 2017 in the 50 Playwrights Project. The work was Más Cara, which was a part of the Austin New Latino Play Festival in 2016 as a workshop reading. Más Cara is about Mexicana stereotypical characters interacting with each other who become self-aware by traveling through time and planes of existence.

She received media attention for her 2015 play, Robin Hood: An Elegy. Playing at Austin theater venue The Vortex, it centered on the Black Lives Matter movement through the lens of the classic myth of Robin Hood. It uses some of the same methods of Más Cara, such as time travel, but focuses more on Gonzales' Black roots than her Latina ones.

Gonzales' most recent play is a radio play produced by DTC Radio and released online in 2018,: When You KnoW, You KnoW.

== Recognition ==
Gonzales has been featured in articles in The Austin Chronicle for her work as a playwright and actress. These articles are primarily about the role of Afro-Latinx theater in the Austin arts scene. The articles that feature her are about the art that she is a part of, such as The Cucuy Project - a project that centers various Latinx artists such as Gonzales and uses puppetry, Robin Hood: An Elegy, Bright Half Life - Gonzales (actor) and El Nogalar (actor).

== Works ==
=== Writing ===
==== Plays ====
- Robin Hood: An Elegy
- Más Cara
- When You KnoW, You KnoW

=== Acting ===
==== Film ====
- Hindsight
- Burn it to the Ground
- Dry Spell
- Violet Slumber
- Searching for Newman
- Octia of the Pink Ocean
- Planet of the Mermaids

==== Theater ====
- Club Friendship
- It's Personal: Love
- Bright Half Life
- El Nogalar
- The Last Days of Judas Iscariot
- Should've Never
- Cold April
- A Raisin in the Sun

==== Voice work ====
- Why Don't I Like The Way I Look?
- Boobs and More
- Elemental
- Inside Out 2
- New Panty & Stocking with Garterbelt
