= Panty & Stocking with Garterbelt =

Japanese anime television series

- Promotional artwork for the anime, featuring Panty (top) and Stocking (bottom)

パンティ&ストッキングwithガーターベルト (Panti ando Sutokkingu with Gātāberuto)
- Genre: Action; Comedy
- Created by: Gainax
- Manga
- Written by: TAGRO
- Published by: Kadokawa Shoten
- English publisher: NA: Dark Horse Comics
- Imprint: Kadokawa Comics Ace
- Magazine: Young Ace
- Original run: August 4, 2010 – June 4, 2011
- Volumes: 1
- Anime television series
- Directed by: Hiroyuki Imaishi
- Produced by: Naoshi Imamoto; Jun Fukuda; Sōichi Tsuji; Satoshi Fujita; Kazuya Masumoto; Natsuki Uetake; Tomoko Suzuki; Katsumi Yasuda
- Written by: Geek Fleet
- Music by: Taku Takahashi (M-Flo); TCY Crew (TeddyLoid)
- Studio: Gainax
- Licensed by: Crunchyroll (Note: In North America through Crunchyroll, LLC (formerly known as Funimation), in the United Kingdom through Crunchyroll UK and Ireland (formerly known as Manga Entertainment) and in Australia through Crunchyroll Pty (formerly known as Madman Anime))
- Original network: BS NTV, tvk, TVQ, CTC, SUN, GBS, Tokyo MX, MTV, TVS (censored); AT-X (uncensored)
- Original run: October 2, 2010 – December 25, 2010
- Episodes: 13 (28 segments) + 1 OVA (8 segments)
- Anime television series

New Panty & Stocking with Garterbelt
- Directed by: Hiroyuki Imaishi; Hiromi Wakabayashi; Akira Furukawa
- Produced by: Ryō Takaoka; Tong Wu; Nishi Nishi; Kazuya Masumoto; Naoko Tsutsumi (animation)
- Written by: Hiroyuki Imaishi; Hiromi Wakabayashi
- Music by: Various (Note: TeddyLoid, Taku Takahashi (M-Flo), Taku Inoue, 80Kidz, KM, TAAR, Monjoe, Yackle, Mitsunori Ikeda, and Junji Chiba)
- Studio: Trigger
- Licensed by: Amazon Prime Video
- Original network: Tokyo MX, BS NTV, SUN, KBS, MTV, TVQ, GBS, TVh (censored); AT-X (uncensored)
- Original run: July 10, 2025 – September 25, 2025
- Episodes: 13 (30 segments)
- icon

Panty & Stocking with Garterbelt (Japanese: パンティ&ストッキングwithガーターベルト, Hepburn: Panti ando Sutokkingu wizu Gātāberuto), often shortened to just Panty & Stocking, is a Japanese anime television series produced by Gainax, as well as a series of tie-in media developed around it. The series ran from October to December 2010 on BS NTV and other channels. The rights to the series were later acquired by Trigger. A sequel, titled New Panty & Stocking with Garterbelt, aired from July to September 2025.

== Story ==
The flag of Daten City, seen in the anime, references the flags of Japan and the United States.

The series revolves around the exploits of the Anarchy sisters, Panty and Stocking, angels who were exiled from Heaven due to their bad behavior. They are sent to Daten City, California, (Note: A pun on the Japanese word datenshi (堕天使; lit. "fallen angels")) a place on the border between Heaven and Hell, where they live at the church Cemetery Hills under the care of the reverend Garterbelt. The city is besieged by evil spirits referred to as Ghosts, which the sisters are tasked with destroying through their ability to transform their lingerie into weapons. By doing so, the sisters earn Heaven Coins with which they intend to one day buy their way back into Heaven. However, Panty and Stocking are constantly sidetracked by their respective addictions to sex and sugary sweets.

Throughout the first season, the Anarchy sisters clash with their demonic counterparts, the Demon sisters Scanty and Kneesocks, who oversee the production of Ghosts in Daten City. The Demon sisters serve under Corset, Daten City's mayor, who seeks the blood kin of Hell's Monkey to unlock the gates to Hell and unleash the evil forces within; this kin is eventually revealed to be Brief, the Anarchy sisters' occult geek friend, whose penis functions as the required key. After Panty and Stocking thwart Corset, the season concludes with a cliffhanger twist ending in which Stocking kills Panty, reveals herself to be a demon, and joins forces with a significantly weakened Corset.

In the second season, Stocking's demon nature is revealed to be the work of Corset's brainwashing, and a resurrected Panty returns her to normal with the aid of Scanty and Kneesocks; the Demon sisters are consequently banished from Hell, while Corset is killed. Afterward, the Demon sisters take up residence at Cemetery Hills as reluctant allies to the Anarchy sisters, sharing a similar mission of collecting Hell Coins required for their own return home. The four also compete against the Anarchy sisters' cousins, the angel brothers Polyester and Polyurethane, who harbor their own agenda against the angel sisters.

The post-credits scene at the end of the second season introduces two new characters named Bastard and Junior. Junior is the son of Panty and Brief, while Bastard's origins are unknown. Stocking, showing a new appearance, acts as the high priestess at Cemetery Hills Church, taking the place of the now-deceased Garterbelt.

== Development ==
Following the broadcast of director Hiroyuki Imaishi's previous project, Gurren Lagann, the series' staff went on a trip for rest and relaxation. At that time, they shared their opinions to each other under drunken and humorous circumstances, saying such things as "Next time, I want to try this" in approaches to animation. Almost all of the concepts for the anime were made during the initial trip; the names of the main characters, "Panty" and "Stocking", were coined at the very first meeting. Hiromi Wakabayashi, who provided the initial idea for the series, cited American adult animation, such as Drawn Together, as inspiration for its crudeness.

== Characters ==
=== Main ===
Panty Anarchy (アナーキー・パンティ, Anākī Panti)
Voiced by: Arisa Ogasawara (Japanese); Jamie Marchi (first series), Courtney Lin (second series) (English)
The older Anarchy sister, also named Pantiel (パンティエル, Pantieru), is a foul-mouthed, sexually promiscuous blonde-haired angel whose only interests are looking for men to have sex with and basking in the popularity of being an Anarchy sister. She does not take her Ghost-hunting duties as seriously as Stocking, preferring to fulfill her personal goal of having sex with 1,000 men on Earth before returning to Heaven. Her underwear transforms into a pistol called Backlace (バックレース, Bakkurēsu). She occasionally wields a second Backlace using Stocking's underwear, doubling her firepower and allowing her to combine them into more advanced firearms such as a submachine gun or sniper rifle. She can weaponize male underwear, though the weapon's size and usefulness depends on the size of the original wearer's penis.
Stocking Anarchy (アナーキー・ストッキング, Anākī Sutokkingu)
Voiced by: Mariya Ise (Japanese); Monica Rial (first series), Cristina Vee (second series) (English)
The younger Anarchy sister, also named Stockiel (ストキエル, Sutokieru), is a pink-and-violet-haired goth angel with a gluttonous appetite for sugary foods. While she does not have the same level of interest in sex as her older sister, Panty, she does show sexual urges and interests and is generally more interested in masochistic activities, such as bondage and electrocution. Her stockings transform into a pair of katana called Stripe I (ストライプI, Sutoraipu Wan) and Stripe II (ストライプII, Sutoraipu Tsū). She owns a stuffed cat doll called Honekoneko (ホネコネコ; lit. "Bone Kitten"), which changes its facial expressions in accordance with Stocking's mood.
Garterbelt (ガーターベルト, Gātāberuto)
Voiced by: Kōji Ishii (Japanese); Christopher Sabat (first series), Daniel Walton (second series) (English)
The reverend of Daten City, and the Anarchy sisters' guardian. Garterbelt is a large black man with a massive afro. He relays missions from Heaven to Panty and Stocking, practices bondage, and displays interest in young males, particularly Brief, disguising himself as a masked figure called "Master G" while undertaking such hobbies. He is cursed with immortality and forbidden from dying until he fulfills his given task.
Chuck (チャック, Chakku)
Voiced by: Takashi Nakamura (Japanese); Ian Sinclair (first series) (English)
Panty and Stocking's sidekick, a green dog-like creature with zippers on his body who closely resembles the character GIR in his own dog disguise from the American animated series Invader Zim. Chuck is often subject to mortal injuries. He can only be immobilized by opening the zippers on his head and releasing his brain, a 2-inch tall incubus who is romantically involved with Fastener's brain. He is used by Heaven as a mailbox of sorts, getting struck by lightning and spitting out a piece of paper containing a clue to a Ghost's whereabouts. He transforms into a Bull Ghost by turning himself inside-out.
Brief (ブリーフ, Burīfu)
Voiced by: Hiroyuki Yoshino (Japanese); Joel McDonald (first series), Kieran Walton (second series) (English)
A self-proclaimed ghost hunter with an interest in science fiction and the supernatural, for which he is nicknamed "Geek Boy" by Panty and Stocking. Brief is enamored with Panty and tries acting as the voice of reason for the Anarchy sisters, but instead becomes the butt of many jokes in the series. His true identity is Briefers Rock (ブリーファス・ロック, Burīfasu Rokku), the handsome son of head of the Rock Foundation, a large corporation in Daten City. In the second season finale, he marries Panty and they have a child together called Junior.
Ghosts (ゴースト, Gōsuto)
The monsters of the week in the series, Ghosts are twisted aberrations born from the regrets or suffering of people who have died and become lost in limbo. Panty and Stocking are tasked with their destruction, which allows them to pass on to Heaven, leaving behind Heaven Coins. Although most Ghosts are savage or destructive, some are relatively harmless annoyances or even oppose their true nature and try to live peacefully. Ghosts are usually slain with angelic weapons, but there are other means of destroying them, such as Ghosts killing each other or peacefully accomplishing what they wanted to achieve in life. As a recurring joke, whenever Panty and Stocking defeat a Ghost with their angelic weapons, a styrofoam model of the Ghost is filmed being blown-up.

=== Recurring ===
==== Introduced in season 1 ====
Scanty Demon (スキャンティ・デイモン, Sukyanti Deimon)
Voiced by: Yuka Komatsu (Japanese); Colleen Clinkenbeard (first series), Cat Protano (second series) (English)
The older of the Demon sisters, and Panty's arch rival. Scanty is a red-skinned demon with green hair and two horns. She is egotistical and prone to angry outbursts when her pride is hurt. She wears two pairs of scanties that transform into revolvers called Double Gold Lacytanga (ダブル・ゴールド・レーシータンガ, Daburu Gōrudo Rēshītanga), which she can combine into a shotgun.
Kneesocks Demon (ニーソックス・デイモン, Nīsokkusu Deimon)
Voiced by: Ayumi Fujimura (first series), Akeno Watanabe (second series) (Japanese); Cherami Leigh (first series), Ryan Bartley (second series) (English)
The younger of the Demon sisters, and Stocking's arch rival. Kneesocks is a red-skinned demon who wears glasses and has blue hair worn in a ponytail. She is calm and sensible, but becomes short-sighted when excited, which causes her face to glow bright red. She wears two kneesocks that transform into a pair of scythes called Double Gold Spandex (ダブル・ゴールド・スパンデックス, Daburu Gōrudo Supandekkusu).
Fastener (ファスナー, Fasunā)
Voiced by: Miki Makiguchi (first series), Yūko Natsuyoshi (second series) (Japanese); Christopher Bevins (first series) (English)
Scanty and Kneesocks' sidekick, and Chuck's rival. Fastener is a pink rodent-like creature with zippers covering his body. He can only be immobilized by opening the zipper on his head and releasing his brain, a 2-inch tall succubus who is romantically involved with Chuck's brain. He can turn himself inside-out into a Hydra Ghost. In the second season, he delivers messages from Hell in the form of stone slabs when his body is filled with lava.
Corset (コルセット, Korusetto)
Voiced by: Shigeru Chiba (Japanese); Chris Ayres (first series), Keith Silverstein (second series) (English)
The mayor of Daten City, and the superior of Scanty and Kneesocks. Corset is a pale blue-skinned demon with a conical hairstyle who wears various types of BDSM equipment such as buckles, mouth-stretching hooks, and a corset that he frequently tightens to enhance his upper body strength.

==== Introduced in season 2 ====
Polyester (ポリエステル, Poriesuteru) and Polyurethane (ポリウレタンテル, Poriuretan Tenshi)
Voiced by: Junya Enoki (Polyester), Yūto Uemura (Polyurethane) (Japanese); Hunter McCoy (Polyester), Corey Wilder (Polyurethane) (English)
The Anarchy sisters' dutiful but spoiled cousins. They are self-proclaimed "newgen" angels who use technologically advanced Ghost-hunting equipment compared to their cousins, including a sensor that detects precisely when Ghosts spawn. When off-duty, they become cordial but refuse to hunt Ghosts regardless of the situation. Their weapons are formed from polymer underwear and polypropylene socks: Polyester, the blue-haired older brother dressed in white, wields a bullet-firing gauntlet, while Polyurethane, the pink-haired younger brother dressed in black, wears a bladed boot.
Gunsmith Bitch (ガンスミスビッチ, Gansumisu Bitchi)
Voiced by: Yoshino Aoyama (Japanese); Krysta Gonzales (English)
An arms dealer and friend of Brief who develops and sells lingerie that transforms into weapons, which are stored in a pocket dimension called the "Pants Dimension". Her public persona is a glasses-wearing geek nicknamed "Geek Girl".
Ramie (ラミー, Ramī)
Voiced by: Toshihiko Seki (Japanese); Devon Stewart (English)
The Anarchy sisters' uncle, father of Polyester and Polyurethane, younger brother of the king of Heaven, and Supreme Overseer of Heavenly Ethics. He allows his sons to plot against his nieces.

== Media ==
=== Anime ===
The television series was directed by Hiroyuki Imaishi and animated by Gainax. The series' animation is done in a distinct style resembling and paying homage to American cartoons, along with the Yoshinori Kanada techniques normally associated with Hiroyuki Imaishi's work. The theme of the anime is "vulgar and indecent jokes", with Imaishi saying, "If we are going to do this, we will try it thoroughly." As a result, the series contains sexual themes and humor in every episode.

The series ran from October 2 to December 25, 2010, on BS NTV and other channels. (Note: BS NTV listed the first series premiere as airing on October 1 at 27:00, which is effectively October 2 at 3:00 a.m. JST.) It was also shown on AT-X seven days after the premiere of each episode, and made available online on Nico Nico Channel (a service of Niconico) through the series's own channel a day after the AT-X broadcast. Internationally, the series was made available for streaming on Crunchyroll.

The series was released in six DVD and Blu-ray volumes, respectively, over the course of six months, with the first DVD/Blu-ray volume released on December 24, 2010, followed by succeeding volumes near the end of each following month. The fifth volume, released on April 28, 2011, includes a disc-exclusive episode (OVA) compiling eight short stories, some of which are sequels/conclusions to earlier episodes of the series.

On April 14, 2011, Funimation announced they licensed the series in North America, which was released on DVD on July 10, 2012. The Blu-ray version was released January 15, 2013. The English dub was directed by Colleen Clinkenbeard, with John Burgmeier acting as head writer and Jamie Marchi, Leah Clark, and Jared Hedges serving as episode writers. The first two episodes were made available for streaming on May 22, 2012, for those subscribed to Funimation's Elite Video Subscription service.

Manga Entertainment released the series in the United Kingdom on July 30, 2012, although upon release, faults were discovered on some of the episodes. A corrected version was released on September 10, 2012.

On November 25, 2016, the official Twitter account for Gainax West posted an announcement teaser image featuring silhouettes of Panty and Stocking with the words "Comming [sic] Soon". An announcement for "something new with Panty & Stocking with Garterbelt" was to be made on December 16, 2016, which Gainax West stated would not be a pachinko, pachislot, social network game, or Blu-ray. On December 16, 2016, various Panty & Stocking with Garterbelt projects were announced.

A new anime project based on the series was announced by Studio Trigger at Anime Expo 2022. At Anime Expo 2023, it was announced that the rights to the Panty & Stocking IP had been acquired from Gainax by Trigger, who shared an announcement video for the project. Imaishi returned as series director, with Imaishi himself also handling series composition alongside Hiromi Wakabayashi and original character designs by Atsushi Nishigori with animation character designs by Shigeto Koyama, Masaru Sakamoto and Sushio. The series world premiere event was held at Anime Expo 2025 on July 4, 2025, marking the 15th anniversary of the original series. A censored version of the series premiered on July 10, 2025, on Tokyo MX, BS NTV and other channels, while the uncensored version premiered on AT-X on July 15. (Note: Tokyo MX, BS NTV and SUN listed the second series premiere as airing on July 9 at 25:00, which is effectively July 10 at 1:00 a.m. JST.) Amazon Prime Video licensed the second series for a global streaming release.

=== Manga ===
A manga adaptation of the series by Tagro was serialized in Kadokawa Shoten's Young Ace magazine between August 2010 and June 2011. The series was compiled in a single tankōbon volume, released in Japan on June 4, 2011, and was published in English by Dark Horse Comics on May 28, 2015. Another manga illustrated by Imaishi was serialised in NewType before moving to Monthly Anime Style magazine. Some strips were included in the Panty & Stocking with Garterbelt: Datencity Paparazzi art book, released on June 4, 2011, but the series has not been published in tankōbon format.

=== Music ===
Panty & Stocking with Garterbelt: The Original Soundtrack

Soundtrack album by TCY FORCE produced by Taku Takahashi
- Released: December 29, 2010
- Genres: Electronic; dance
- Length: 1:18:43
- Label: FlyingDog
- Producer: Taku Takahashi

The series' musical score was composed by TCY Force and produced by Taku Takahashi (of M-Flo). The opening theme is "Theme for Panty & Stocking", performed by Hoshina Anniversary. The ending theme is "Fallen Angel", performed by Mitsunori Ikeda and featuring Aimee B. The original soundtrack was released on December 29, 2010. A hidden track is on the CD. The special edition of the volume 4 BD/DVD includes a bonus CD containing television edits of certain songs from the official soundtrack, as well as previously unreleased songs.

Panty & Stocking with Garterbelt: The Original Soundtrack
No.	Title	Writer(s)	Artist	Length
1.	"Theme for Panty & Stocking"	Hoshina Anniversary	Hoshina Anniversary	0:32
2.	"Immoral Church"	TeddyLoid, Taku Takahashi	TeddyLoid, Takahashi	0:27
3.	"Fly Away"	TeddyLoid	TeddyLoid	4:23
4.	"Daten City"	TeddyLoid	TeddyLoid	0:49
5.	"Beverly Hills Cock"	Takahashi	TCY FORCE	1:25
6.	"Pantscada"	TeddyLoid, Takahashi	TCY FORCE	1:59
7.	"Dancefloor Orgy"	TeddyLoid	TeddyLoid	3:33
8.	"D City Rock"	TeddyLoid, Lisa	TeddyLoid feat. Debra Zeer	4:32
9.	"Juice"	Takahashi	Jun Sasaki	1:03
10.	"EPTM (Booty Bronx Remix)"	Hoshina Anniversary	Hoshina Anniversary feat. Kodai of KinKieS	4:16
11.	"Cherryboy Riot"	TeddyLoid	TeddyLoid	4:33
12.	"Technodildo"	Hoshina Anniversary	Hoshina Anniversary	4:30
13.	"CHOCOLAT"	Emyli & Takahashi	TCY FORCE feat. Mariya Ise	4:06
14.	"Theme for Scanty & Kneesocks"	TeddyLoid	TeddyLoid	4:13
15.	"Schranz Chase"	Booty Bronx	Booty Bronx	5:23
16.	"Tenga Step"	TCY FORCE	TCY FORCE	2:52
17.	"See-Through"	Hoshina Anniversary	Hoshina Anniversary	4:47
18.	"Corset Theme"	TeddyLoid	TeddyLoid	4:34
19.	"Champion"	Emyli, Takahashi	TCY FORCE feat. Emyli	4:51
20.	"Fallen Angel" (includes hidden track)	LISA and Mitsunori Ikeda	Mitsunori Ikeda feat. Aimee B	15:55
Total length:				1:18:43

Panty & Stocking with Garterbelt THE WORST ALBUM

Studio album by TCY FORCE presents TeddyLoid
- Released: July 20, 2011
- Genres: Electronic, dance
- Length: 1:12:43
- Label: flying DOG
- Producer: Taku Takahashi

A second album, Panty & Stocking with Garterbelt THE WORST ALBUM, was released on 20 July 2011 and features 24 tracks, including remixes of previous songs from the original anime soundtrack, some new songs, as well as "Cherry Corrida" drama tracks.

Panty & Stocking with Garterbelt THE WORST ALBUM
No.	Title	Writer(s)	Artist	Length
1.	"Milky Way"	TeddyLoid	TeddyLoid feat. Mariya Ise	4:45
2.	"Cherry Corrida I ~cocks gone: the death of a bitch~" (Script by Koji Seko, directed by Yoshikazu Iwanami)	Koji Seko	TeddyLoid	1:13
3.	"D City Rock (TeddyLoid Live Remix)"	TeddyLoid	TeddyLoid feat. Debra Zeer	6:02
4.	"Cherry Corrida II ~a case of Garterbelt's loss~" (Script by Koji Seko, directed by Yoshikazu Iwanami)	Seko	TeddyLoid	1:06
5.	"Fly Away (Taku & TeddyLoid For the Club Edit)" (Mixed by Mitsunori Ikeda, remix and additional production by Taku Takahashi and TeddyLoid)	TeddyLoid	TeddyLoid	5:14
6.	"S-Trip" (Mixed by Mitsunori Ikeda)	Takahashi & TeddyLoid	TCY FORCE	2:01
7.	"Cherry Corrida III ~a case of Brief's loss~" (Script by Koji Seko, directed by Yoshikazu Iwanami)	Seko	TeddyLoid	0:43
8.	"Ghost Town"	TeddyLoid	TeddyLoid	4:06
9.	"Cherry Corrida IV ~dry bitch and wet goth girl~" (Script by Koji Seko, directed by Yoshikazu Iwanami)	Seko	TeddyLoid	2:07
10.	"Beverly Hills Cock Part.2" (Mixed by Ikeda)	Takahashi & TeddyLoid	TCY FORCE	1:59
11.	"Theme For Panty & Stocking (Hoshina Anniversary Remix)"	TeddyLoid	Hoshina Anniversary	4:52
12.	"Cherry Corrida V ~Dmitri Fullchinkov the cock chopper~" (Script by Koji Seko, directed by Yoshikazu Iwanami)	Seko	TeddyLoid	1:08
13.	"Jumping Mole (Nerdcore Switch)"	Booty Bronx, Ikeda & TeddyLoid	Booty Bronx, Ikeda & TeddyLoid	2:58
14.	"Cherry Corrida VI ~the advent of angels?~" (Script by Koji Seko, directed by Yoshikazu Iwanami)	Seko	TeddyLoid	0:59
15.	"Cherryboy Riot Part.2"	TeddyLoid	TeddyLoid	4:24
16.	"Cherry Corrida VII ~black, huge, solid and stinky~" (Script by Koji Seko, directed by Yoshikazu Iwanami)	Seko	TeddyLoid	0:56
17.	"Yesline Dub"	TeddyLoid	TeddyLoid	3:46
18.	"CHOCOLAT (TeddyLoid Remix)"	TeddyLoid	TCY FORCE feat. Mariya Ise	5:30
19.	"Cherry Corrida VIII ~When You Wish upon a Hole~" (Script by Koji Seko, directed by Yoshikazu Iwanami)	Seko	TeddyLoid	0:41
20.	"Fly Away (El Poco Maro Dubstep Remix)" (Mixed by Mitsunori Ikeda)	TeddyLoid	TeddyLoid	3:22
21.	"Cherry Corrida IX ~cock chopper blues or cock fucker rhapsody~" (Script by Koji Seko, directed by Yoshikazu Iwanami)	Seko	TeddyLoid	2:37
22.	"Champion (TeddyLoid Remix)"	TeddyLoid	TCY FORCE feat. Emyli	5:02
23.	"Cherry Corrida X ~cocks back: the resurrection of a bitch~" (Script by Koji Seko, directed by Yoshikazu Iwanami)	Seko	TeddyLoid	1:13
24.	"Fallen Angel (El Poco Maro Drum'n'Bass Remix)"	TeddyLoid	Ikeda feat. Aimee B	6:00
Total length:				1:12:43

== Critical reception and cultural impact ==
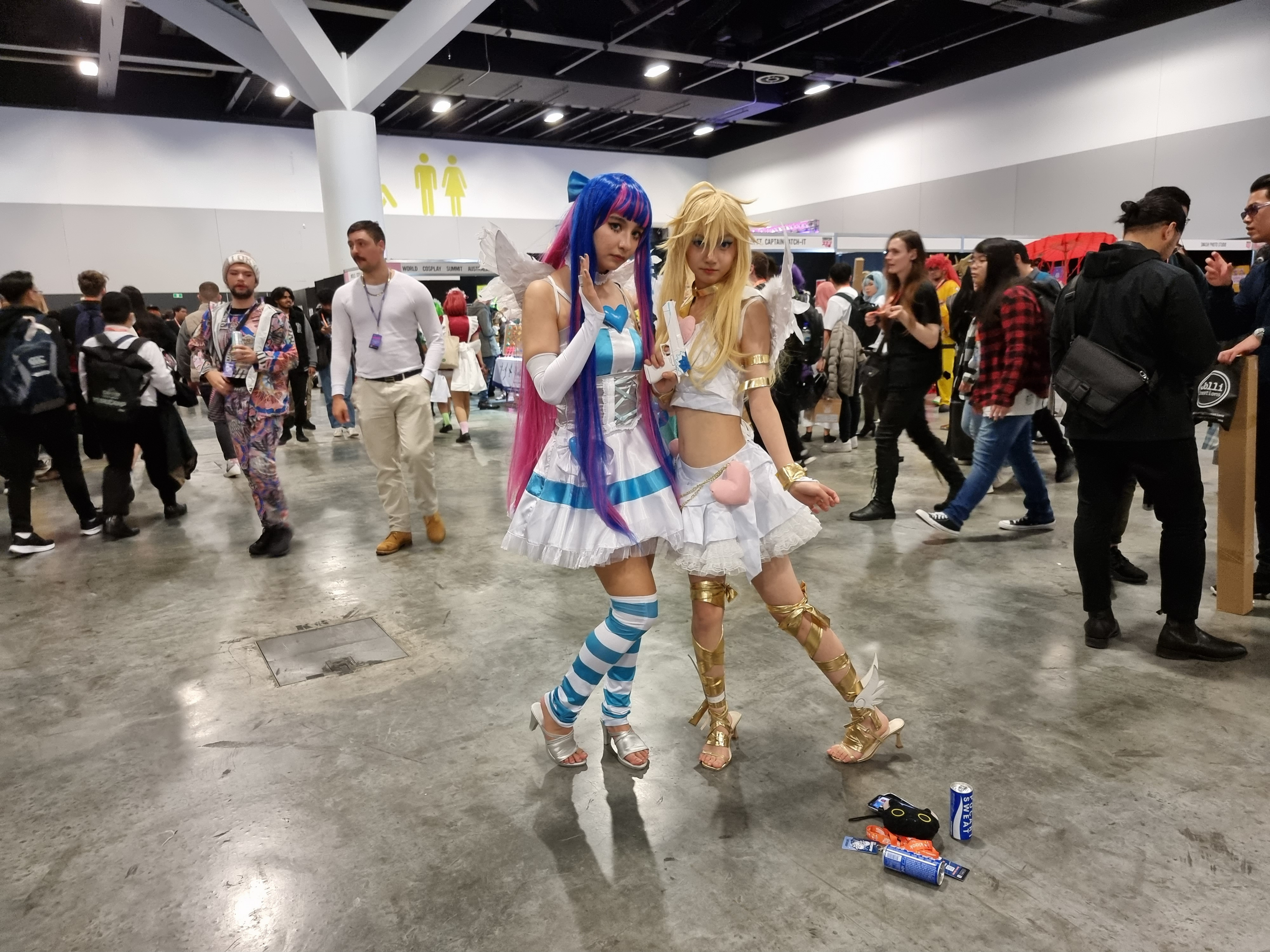
Panty and Stocking cosplayers at a Smash! convention

Panty & Stocking received a polarized reaction from critics. Carl Kimlinger of Anime News Network found the series to be "unremittingly revolting" and "generally not funny". Anime News Network's individual episode reviews were equally critical, accusing the series more than once of having a style-over-substance approach and generally flawed, tasteless and needlessly disturbing comedy in spite of its impressive production values. Reviewer Gia Manry found the visuals and sounds to be overwhelming and the writing substandard, concluding the review with a 1 out of 5 score. Critic Jacob Chapman considered the series to be a "mess" with a "poisonous air hanging around [it]" and thoroughly unpleasant to sit through.

However, David Brothers of Comics Alliance said that the series felt like the result of an "unholy union" between The Ren & Stimpy Show and Dirty Pair. He recommended it, saying "it's raunchy, gross, a whole lot of fun" and that "the mix of disparate influences and material makes it a refreshingly funny anime, and dumb in a way where you can clearly see the hand of smart, experienced animators at work behind the scenes." Mike LeChevallier of Japanator said that "where plot structure is hit or miss, the pure stylization, soundtrack and memorable characters make this a series one worth watching from start to finish."

In 2011, Panty & Stocking with Garterbelt was part of the Jury Selections of the 15th Japan Media Arts Festival in the Animation category. In 2019, Polygon named Panty & Stocking with Garterbelt as one of the best anime of the 2010s, stating that it "delivered raunchy, stupid humor in a great animation style", while Crunchyroll listed it in their "Top 100 best anime of the 2010s" list. IGN also listed Panty & Stocking with Garterbelt among the best anime series of the 2010s, describing it as "an irreverent, entertaining joy-ride with dozens of tributes to western cartoons and a bangin' soundtrack".

New Panty & Stocking with Garterbelt has received generally positive reviews. Critics have praised Studio Trigger's updated animation and character designs for capturing the original series' style while utilizing modern techniques. Joshua Fox of Screen Rant described the original 2010 series as "one of the wildest anime ever produced" by the studio's founders, noting its raunchy dialogue and visuals for maximizing absurdity. He observed that while the series did not achieve the same recognition as other Studio Trigger projects, it is still held in high regard. According to Gizmodo, the show is often characterized as a fusion of the style of The Powerpuff Girls with the crass humor of Adult Swim, and it became a cult favorite for its brazen comedy and exaggerated action.

The performances of the new English voice cast received a mixed reception from critics, with many fans expressing dissatisfaction, particularly noting that the new cast did not match the original cast and lacked their charm. The transition in licensing from Crunchyroll for the first season to Amazon Prime Video for the second season was also a point of disappointment for long-time fans. While critics acknowledged the new cast, many fans felt the recasting diminished the series' humor and character dynamics, reflecting a broader preference for the original cast.
