= Kaze no Ongaku: Radiating from an N.G.O =

Kaze no Ongaku ~Radiating from an N.G.O~

Compilation album by LISA
- Released: July 27, 2005
- Recorded: 1993–1994
- Genre: Pop; rock
- Language: Japanese
- Label: Tokuma Japan Communications; TKCA-72888 (Japan, CD)
- Producer: KouTaro Nakano

LISA chronology
Melody Circus (2005)	Kaze no Ongaku ~Radiating from an N.G.O~ (2005)	God Sista (2006)

Kaze no Ongaku: Radiating from an N.G.O (Japanese: かぜのおんがく~Radiating from an N.G.O~; "Music of the Wind") is the first compilation album by Japanese artist LISA. The album was released by her previous record label, Tokuma Japan Communications, who she had joined in 1993 at the age of 18. She had only released two singles under the label before being dropped and joining with the Kitty MME label for two singles in 1994.

== Background information ==
Kaze no Ongaku: Radiating from an N.G.O is the first compilation album by Japanese R&B record producer LISA. The album, however, was not released by her current record label, Rhythm Zone, but was, instead, released by her first label Tokuma Japan Communications, who she had joined at the age of 18 in 1993. During her time with the label, she released two singles: Out of Cry (stylized as OUT OF CRY) and One World (stylized as ONE WORLD). The album failed to chart, due to the lack of promotion.

The album was released after her Melody Circus album, which was released under Avex, and before her concept album God Sista in March the following year. However, due to Kaze no Ongaku not being released by Avex, the album did not receive promotion, whereas the Tokuma Japan Communications company no longer had the rights to LISA's image.

Kaze no Ongaku contained previously unreleased songs LISA had recorded while under the label, along with two songs she did release, "One World" and its B-side "Natural Human Being". Others are live versions she had performed on the DVD Kaze no Ongaku ~LISA LIVE AID~.

While LISA performed predominantly R&B and reggae later in her career - as with her time in m-flo and as a soloist - Kaze no Ongaku was a blend of pop and rock.

== Track listing ==
CD
No.	Title	Length
1.	"Prologue (Knockin' On Heaven's Door)"	3:13
2.	"Tomodachi ni Narō" (友だちになろう / Let's Be Friends)	6:00
3.	"Message1"	0:41
4.	"Natural Human Being" (live at Jirokichi)	4:13
5.	"Message2"	0:37
6.	"Gypsy Woman"	4:27
7.	"Message3"	0:34
8.	"Komoriuta o Kudasai" (子守唄をください / Please Sing Me a Lullaby)	4:19
9.	"message4"	0:39
10.	"Kibō" (希望 / Hope)	3:56
11.	"Message5"	1:00
12.	"Nagisa Nite -Kobune (Instrumental)" (渚にて -小舟 / By the Seaside -Small Boat)	7:22
13.	"Message6"	0:42
14.	"Kono Inochi" (この命 / This Life)	6:04
15.	"Rinne" (輪廻 / Reincarnation)	5:29
16.	"Message7"	2:06
17.	"Kobune" (小舟 / Small Boat)	4:50
18.	"Message8 -on Natural Human Being-"	3:46
19.	"One World"	4:45
20.	"Message9 -Natural Human Being (Original)-"	3:57
21.	"Epilogue (One World)"	1:54
22.	"Jūnana-sai - Furyō" (十七歳 -不良 / Seventeen Years Old -Delinquent)	4:03
