= Elizabeth (Lisa album) =

Studio album by LISA
- Released: October 25, 2006
- Recorded: 2005–2006
- Genre: R&B; pop
- Language: Japanese
- Label: Avex, Rhythm Zone; RZCD-45445 (Japan, CD)

LISA chronology
God Sista (2006)	Elizabeth (2006)	Lisabest: Mission on Earth 9307 (2007)

Singles from Elizabeth
- 1. "I, Rhythm" Released: October 26, 2005; 2. "Showtime" Released: September 13, 2006

Elizabeth (stylized as ELIZABETH) is the third studio album by Japanese artist LISA, released under the Avex sub-label Rhythm Zone. The album charted at #60 on the Oricon charts, ranking lower than her last studio album, Gratitude, which had charted at #18.

== Background information ==
Elizabeth is LISA's third studio album and sixth overall album. It was released six months after her last album, God Sista. The album charted low on the Oricon Albums Charts at #60 and remained on the charts for four weeks. The album was only released as a CD, not carrying a CD+DVD counterpart.

Elizabeth featured several of her singles, including "I, Rhythm" and "Showtime," along with remixes of "Tripod Baby" and "Precious Message." For the latter, LISA worked with remix artist R. Yamaki, who had previously worked with fellow label-mate Koda Kumi for the remix of her song "Yume with You." LISA had previously performed the original "Tripod Baby" with m-flo on their album Beat Space Nine, which had been released a year prior on August 8, 2005.

The album also featured songs from her concept album, God Sista: "It's On" and "hit da spot." This would be her last studio album until the release of Disco Volante three years later.

== Track listing ==
CD
No.	Title	Length
1.	"I, Rhythm"	3:39
2.	"Tripod Baby" (CLASH the SOUND Remix)	6:05
3.	"It's On"	4:15
4.	"lonely"	5:34
5.	"on the lockdown"	4:21
6.	"Precious Message" (R Yamaki's Groove mix)	4:32
7.	"do yo thing"	3:41
8.	"OUCH!"	3:01
9.	"boy crazy"	4:54
10.	"hit da spot"	4:57
11.	"Stay, forever"	4:36
12.	"Showtime"	4:21
