= Disco Volante (Lisa album) =

Studio album by Lisa
- Released: November 11, 2009
- Recorded: 2007–2009
- Genres: Electro pop; pop; house
- Length: 1:11:48
- Languages: Japanese, English
- Label: Rhythm Zone
- Producer: Lisa

Lisa chronology
Got that Fever (2008)	Disco Volante (2009)	Family (2012)

Singles from Disco Volante
- 1. "Falling for You..." Released: November 11, 2009

Disco Volante (known as No Feva, No Life!! for the digital release) is the fourth studio album by Japanese-Colombian singer Lisa of the group M-Flo, which released on November 11, 2009. The album was the final chapter in Lisa's "luxury disco" series, which started with the extended plays Ready to Disco (2008) and Got that Fever, (2008) and featured a primarily dance, house and electro-pop sound. The album's leading promotional song, "Falling for You...", saw Lisa reunited with her former bandmate Verbal from M-Flo.

== Background and development ==
After releasing her greatest hits album Lisabest: Mission on Earth 9307 in June 2007 which chronicled Lisa's solo career away from M-Flo, Lisa began working on a series of dance music extended plays entitled the "luxury disco series", which focused on house, electro and disco music. Originally the releases were intended to be three extended plays themed around different seasons of the year. The first of these, Ready to Disco, was released in February 2008. The second EP, Got that Fever, was led by the track "Leave", which was produced by Britney Spears collaborators Bloodshy & Avant. It was released in August, and on September 9, 2008, Lisa performed at the El Divino club on Ibiza, in front of a crowd of 2,000 people.

In late 2009, Lisa took part in M-Flo's 10th anniversary project. She recorded the song "Sound Boy Thriller" for the group's compilation album MF10: 10th Anniversary Best in October, and performed during the M-Flo 10 Years Special Live "We Are One" special concerts, held on November 14 and 15 at the Yoyogi National Gymnasium.

The album featured two songs each from the extended plays: "Leave" and "Other Side of Now" from Got that Fever, and "Crave" and "Send My Heart" from Ready to Disco, as well as a Japanese version of a song that Lisa released for the dance music compilation album House Nation: Beach '09 in July. In addition to these songs, the album also featured four high-profile collaborations that featured Lisa as bonus tracks: "House Nation" (2008) from the dance project Ravex's album Trax, "Fire Woo Foo Foo" from rapper Diggy-Mo''s album Diggyism (2009), "My One Star" from DJ Makai's album Stars, and "Sound Boy Thriller" from M-Flo's compilation album MF10: 10th Anniversary Best (2009).

== Promotion and release ==
"Falling for You..." featuring Verbal from M-Flo was the leading promotional single from Disco Volante. The song received a music video, and enough radio airplay to reach number 54 on the Billboard Japan Adult Contemporary Airplay chart. In addition to "Falling for You...", several songs were used in promotional campaigns. Three songs were used as TV Asahi television program theme songs: "Send My Heart" for the variety show G-Tech, "Leave" for the variety show Kanzen Gekijō, "Love" for the music program Future Tracks R, "Traveler" was used as a commercial jingle for Mitsui Outlet Park, while "Shake My Heart" was chosen as the TV jingle for the accessory brand Bliss Bear, after the album's release in December.

== Critical reception ==
CDJournal reviewers described the album as "composed entirely of eurobeat, upbeat positive tunes", and in particular praised the song "Alone", calling it "a precious ballad".

== Track listing ==
No.	Title	Lyrics	Music	Arranger(s)	Length
1.	"Falling for You..." (featuring Verbal (M-Flo))	Lisa; Verbal	Lisa	Satoshi Hidaka	4:37
2.	"Frozen"	Lisa	Lisa	Sugaya Bros	3:46
3.	"Traveler"	Lisa	Lisa	Toshimichi Tsuge (Lil)	5:36
4.	"Send My Heart"	Lisa	Lisa	Shinnosuke (Soul'd Out)	4:28
5.	"Leave"	Lisa	Lisa; Christian Karlsson; Pontus Winnberg	Bloodshy & Avant	3:59
6.	"Love"	Lisa	Lisa	Ryuichiro Yamaki	4:49
7.	"Shake My Heart"	Lisa	Lisa	Ken Arai	4:30
8.	"Crave"	Lisa	Lisa	Yamaki	5:42
9.	"Planet Love"	Lisa	Lisa	Pink Chemeleons	6:04
10.	"Alone"	Lisa	Lisa	Shingo.S	4:00
11.	"Other Side of Now"	Lisa	Lisa	Hisashi Nawata	3:41
12.	"Fire Woo Hoo Hoo" (Diggy-Mo' featuring Lisa)	Diggy-Mo'; Lisa	Diggy-Mo'; Satoshi Hidaka; Lisa	Diggy-Mo'; Satoshi Hidaka	4:47
13.	"House Nation" (Ravex featuring Lisa)	Lisa	Ravex; Lisa	Ravex	4:08
14.	"My One Star" (Makai featuring Lisa)	Lisa	Masanobu Komaba; Koichi Makai	Takashi Ikezawa	5:22
15.	"Sound Boy Thriller" (M-Flo feeeeeeeeeeat. Lisa)	M-Flo; Lisa	M-Flo; Lisa	M-Flo	6:04
Total length:					1:11:48

Digital edition: No Feva, No Life!!
No.	Title	Length
1.	"Falling for You..." (featuring Verbal (M-Flo))	4:37
2.	"Frozen"	3:46
3.	"Traveler"	5:36
4.	"Send My Heart"	4:28
5.	"Leave"	3:59
6.	"Love"	4:49
7.	"Shake My Heart"	4:30
8.	"Crave"	5:42
9.	"Planet Love"	6:04
10.	"Alone"	4:00
11.	"Other Side of Now"	3:41
12.	"House Nation" (Ravex featuring Lisa)	4:08
13.	"Sound Boy Thriller" (M-Flo feeeeeeeeeeat. Lisa)	6:04
14.	"Falling for You... [Extended Ver.]" (featuring Verbal (M-Flo))	6:57
Total length:		1:08:21

== Charts ==
Chart (2014)	Peak position
Japan Oricon weekly albums	146

== Release history ==
Region	Date	Format	Distributing Label
Japan	November 11, 2009	CD	Rhythm Zone
Japan	November 18, 2009	Digital download	Rhythm Zone
