= Juicy Music =

Studio album by LISA
- Released: April 16, 2003
- Recorded: 2002–2003
- Genre: R&B; hip hop; rock; reggae; pop
- Length: 61:00 (CD)
- Language: Japanese
- Label: Avex Trax

LISA chronology
Juicy Music (2003)	Gratitude (2004)

Singles from Juicy Music
- 1. "Move On" Released: January 9, 2002; 2. "Babylon no Kiseki" Released: May 29, 2002; 3. "I'm All You" Released: October 31, 2002; 4. "Superstar" Released: March 26, 2003

Professional ratings
Review scores
Source	Rating
HMV	4.5/5 stars
Amazon Japan	4.5/5 stars

Juicy Music is LISA's debut album, released on April 16, 2003. This is her first solo album after she left M-Flo in the spring of 2002.It debuted at #5 on the weekly albums chart with 19,236 copies sold. The album stayed in the Top 20 the next two weeks and on its fourth week, which accumulated with 42,814 copies sold.

== Track listing ==
No.	Title	Lyrics	Music	Length
1.	"Juicy World" (~Introlude~)		LISA	0:49
2.	"Superstar"	Lisa	Lisa	4:53
3.	"Galaxy"	Lisa	Lisa	5:14
4.	"You are beautiful" (~Interlude~)		Lisa	0:25
5.	"Natural Color"	Lisa	Lisa	4:34
6.	"Best Wishes" (original)	Lisa	Lisa	5:34
7.	"Move On"	Lisa	Lisa	4:35
8.	"Inspiration"	Lisa	Lisa	4:55
9.	"The Shwing feat. DABO"	Lisa	Lisa	4:21
10.	"What you gonna do?" (~break~)		Lisa	0:25
11.	"I Promise"	Lisa	Lisa	5:13
12.	"Ienakute mo..." (言えなくても / Even if you can't say it)	Lisa	Lisa	4:11
13.	"I'm All You"	Lisa	Lisa	5:09
14.	"Let Me Cry"	Lisa	Lisa	6:44
15.	"Babylon no Kiseki" (バビロンの奇跡 / Miracle of Babylon)	Lisa	Lisa	3:32
16.	"Sayounara Juicy ~call and response~"		Lisa	1:41
17.	"Best Wishes" (extended wishes without intro)	Lisa	Lisa	6:06

== Release history ==
Region	Date	Format	Distributing Label
Japan	April 16, 2003	CD	Rhythm Zone
Taiwan	May 2, 2003	CD	Avex Taiwan
