= Maiko Nakamura =

Maiko Nakamura 中村 舞子
- Born: 15 June 1991 (age 35); Manila, Philippines
- Origin: Tokyo, Japan
- Genres: Pop, contemporary R&B
- Occupations: R&B singer
- Years active: 2008–present
- Labels: No Doubt Tracks (2008–2010); King Records (2010–2011); Knife Edge Label (2011-present)

Maiko Nakamura (中村 舞子, Nakamura Maiko; born June 15, 1991) is a Japanese R&B singer who debuted as a musician in 2008 with the song "Because...," a collaboration with LGYankees. Since then, she has collaborated on a number of singles with R&B musicians. In 2011, she broke into the top 10 on the RIAJ Digital Track Chart with her two collaborations with the group Cliff Edge: "The Answer" from her second album Answer, as well as "Endless Tears" from the group's greatest hits album Best of Love.

== Biography ==
Nakamura's mother is of Spanish and Filipino origin, while her father is Japanese. Influenced by her parents, she grew up surrounded by Western music from an early age.

In October 2011, Nakamura switched labels from King Records to Pony Canyon's KnifeEdge, releasing her song "Never Let Me Go" as her first release.

== Discography ==
=== Albums ===
Year	Album information	Chart position	Total sales
2010	Cure: Released: January 20, 2010; Label: No Doubt Tracks (QWCH-10016); Formats: CD, digital download, rental CD	45	6,400
2011	Answer: Debut major label album; Released: January 12, 2011; Label: King Records (KICS-91638); Formats: CD, digital download, rental CD	23	11,000

=== Extended plays ===
Year	Album information
2010	Step By Step: iTunes exclusive EP; Released: March 31, 2010; Label: Damore MC Promotion Inc.; Formats: Digital download
2011	Moment: Wonder Goo exclusive release to celebrate her 20th birthday; Released: June 15, 2011; Label: B-Fairy Records (BRCA-00005); Formats: CD

=== Singles ===
==== Singles as lead artist ====
Release	Title	Notes	Chart positions		Album
Release	Title	Notes	Billboard Japan Hot 100	RIAJ digital tracks	Album
2010	"First Desire" feat. Hiro from LGYankees, Yamazaru	Promotional single, music video filmed	88	25	Cure
2010	"Waiting for Love" feat. Noa	Promotional single	—	31	Cure
2011	"Fragile (Anata ga Ita...)" (あなたがいた; "I Had You")	Promotional single	—	29	Answer
2011	"The Answer" feat. Cliff Edge	Promotional single, music video filmed	47	8	Answer
2011	"Let Go"	Promotional single, M-Flo cover	—	6	M-Flo Tribute: Stitch the Future and Past
2011	"Never Let Me Go"	Debut digital single under Pony Canyon	—	22	-

==== Singles as featured artist ====
Release	Artist	Title	Notes	Chart position		Album
Release	Artist	Title	Notes	Billboard Japan Hot 100	RIAJ digital tracks	Album
2008	LGYankees feat. Maiko Nakamura	"Because..."	Charted in 2009, music video filmed	—	83	No Doubt!!!: No Limit
2009	Noa feat. Maiko Nakamura	"Tsuki no Hikari" (月のヒカリ; "Moon Light")	Promotional single	—	13	Lucy Love: Season II
2009	LGYankees feat. Maiko Nakamura	"Love Sick"	Promotional single	—	16	Made in LGYankees
2009	So-Ta feat. Maiko Nakamura	"Precious Days"	Promotional single	—	13	Why
2010	T CLIFF EDGE feat. Maiko Nakamura	"Aitakute, Sunao ni Narenakute" (会いたくて、素直になれなくて; "I Miss You, I've Gotta Be Honest")	Promotional single	—	18	Re:Birth
2010	Zushi Sankyōdai with Maiko Nakamura	"Love for You..."	Promotional single	—	44	Z3 Drive Music
2011	CLIFF EDGE feat. Maiko Nakamura	"Endless Tears"	Promotional single, music video filmed	26	2	Best of Love
2011	Firework DJs	"This Love" mix Maiko Nakamura	Digital single	—	66	-
2011	KG	"Itsumo Soba de" (いつもそばで; "Always By My Side") duet with Maiko Nakamura	Promotional single	—	13	Still Goes On...
2011	CLIFF EDGE feat. Maiko Nakamura	"The Distance"	Promotional single, music video filmed	24	11	Love Symphony

=== Other appearances ===
Release	Artist	Title	Album
2009	LGYankees feat. Maiko Nakamura	"Because..." (Live)	No Doubt!!!: No Limit Live 2008 (DVD)
2009	Noa feat. Maiko Nakamura	"Tsuki no Hikari" (DJ No.2 (LGYankees) Remix)	Lucy Love Winter Season
2010	So-Ta feat. Maiko Nakamura	"Precious Days" (Live)	No Doubt Life!!: Live Tour 2009 (DVD)
2010	Noa feat. Maiko Nakamura	"Tsuki no Hikari" (Live)	No Doubt Life!!: Live Tour 2009 (DVD)
2010	Maiko Nakamura feat. Hiro from LGYankees, Yamazaru	"First Desire" (Live)	No Doubt Life!!: Live Tour 2009 (DVD)
2010	LGYankees feat. Maiko Nakamura	"Because..." (Live)	No Doubt Life!!: Live Tour 2009 (DVD)
2010	LGYankees feat. Maiko Nakamura	"Because... (LG Mega Mix!!!!!)"	No Doubt Tracks
