= Gratitude (Lisa album) =

Studio album by LISA
- Released: June 30, 2004
- Recorded: 2003–2004
- Genre: R&B; pop
- Language: Japanese
- Label: Avex, Rhythm Zone

LISA chronology
Juicy Music (2003)	Gratitude (2004)	Melody Circus (2005)

Singles from Gratitude
- 1. "Flower For The Lion e.p. ～Peace in Love～" Released: July 24, 2003; 2. "My Dearest" Released: January 21, 2004; 3. "SWITCH" Released: April 21, 2004

Professional ratings
Review scores
Source	Rating
HMV	5/5 stars

Gratitude (stylized as GRATITUDE) is LISA's second album, her first being Juicy Music, and was released on June 30, 2004. The album charted at #18 during its first week on the Oricon Albums Charts, with 11,049 copies sold.

== Background information ==
Gratitude is Japanese R&B/reggae singer LISA's second studio album since she left the hip-hop duo m-flo. The album was released in June 2004 and debuted at #19 on Oricon, staying on the charts for seven weeks. During its run, the album sold 11,049 in its first week and a total of 22,393 by the end of week seven.

The album was released as a CD+Bonus CD edition - the latter of which featured covers of famous songs, both in English and Japanese. Some of the songs included "Lucky Star" by Madonna, "Time After Time" by Cyndi Lauper and "I Only Want to Be with You" by Dusty Springfield.

To help promote the album, some of the songs were used in promotional advertisements. Those songs included "So Beautiful" for Nivea, "I Only Want To Be With You" for an electronics store and "Switch" for the Crimson Tears video game.

The album featured several Japanese artists on various tracks. Japanese salsa band Orquesta de la Luz ("Orchestra of the Light") collaborated with LISA for the track "Gracias a Dios" (lit. Thank God). Reggae band HOME GROWN was featured in two tracks on the album: "Peace in Love" (track #6) and "Tonbo," which was track #3 on the second disc. Eurobeat soloist LISA LION also made an appearance for the song "i am pop."

== Promotional advertisements ==
Some of the album's tracks were used to help promote both shows and products.

"So Beautiful" (track #4) was used in an advertisement for Nivea's Medicated Body Whitening "Stretch Up." (ニベアボディ薬用ホワイトニング・ストレッチアップ / BODI Yakuyou HOWAITONINGU STRETCH UP). "I Only Want To Be With You" was used in a television commercial for TDK Electronics.

The only other track to be used was "Switch," which was used as the theme song to the Japan released Capcom game Crimson Tears for the PlayStation 2.

== Track listing ==
All lyrics are written by LISA

CD
No.	Title	Length
1.	"Opening act: The calling"
2.	"I am pop feat. LISA LION"
3.	"SWITCH feat. Koda Kumi & Heartsdales"
4.	"So Beautiful"
5.	"Remember me"
6.	"Peace in Love feat. HOME GROWN"
7.	"believe, believe"
8.	"GET REAL"
9.	"Interlude: How did it move you?"
10.	"Eien" (永遠 / Forever)
11.	"My Dearest"
12.	"Gracias a Dios feat. ORQUESTA DE LA LUZ"
13.	"Gratilude: Ending act: Thank you"

Bonus CD
No.	Title	Lyrics	Music	Original artist	Length
1.	"Gozen 3-ji no Opu （3.A.M. OP）" (午前3時のオプ / 3 in the Morning)	DOUBLE KNOCKOUT CORP.	DOUBLE KNOCKOUT CORP.	Flipper's Guitar
2.	"Lucky Star"	Madonna	Madonna • Reggie Lucas	Madonna
3.	"Tonbo feat. HOME GROWN" (とんぼ / Dragonfly)	Tsuyoshi Nagabuchi	Tsuyochi Nagabuchi	Tsuyoshi Nagabuchi
4.	"Time After Time"	Cyndi Lauper • Rob Hyman	Cyndi Lauper • Rob Hyman	Cyndi Lauper
5.	"Why do fools fall in love"	Herman Santiago • Frankie Lymon	Herman Santiago	Frankie Lymon & The Teenagers
6.	"I ONLY WANT TO BE WITH YOU"	Mike Hawker • Ivor Raymonde	Mike Hawker • Ivor Raymonde	Dusty Springfield
