= Babylon no Kiseki =

Single by LISA

from the album Juicy Music
- Released: May 29, 2002 (JP)
- Recorded: 2002
- Genre: Pop/Rock
- Label: Rhythm Zone; RZCD-45059 (Japan, CD)

LISA singles chronology
"Move On" (2002)	"Babylon no Kiseki" (2002)	"i'm all you" (2002)

Babylon no Kiseki (バビロンの奇跡 / Miracle of Babylon) is the second single by Japanese recording artist LISA since her split from m-flo, and sixth overall single. It ranked at #31 on the Oricon charts and stayed on the charts for one month. It became the ending theme song for the television show Future Tracks.

== Background information ==
Babylon no Kiseki is the second single by Japanese R&B soloist LISA under the Avex sub-label Rhythm Zone since splitting from the hip-hop duo m-flo. The single peaked at #31 on Oricon, but took the #36 spot on the Weekly Singles Charts, remaining on the charts for four consecutive weeks.

The single was only released as a CD. Although it was given a music video for the single's promotional run, the video would not be released for purchase until her 2005 cover album Melody Circus. The title track was composed by Tokyo Ska Paradise Orchestra, a ska/jazz band created in 1988.

LISA wrote the lyrics to "Babylon no Kiseki" to reflect how the society in Japan was at the time. During an interview for the single, LISA said how "You look at the world right now and there’s war and recession . . . suicide and homeless people.” However, LISA said how the song was also optimistic of what was the come, how people "are alive at this stage for a reason" and that each person "is a miracle . . . even if your situation is Babylon."

== Promotional activities ==
"Babylon no Kiseki" was used as the end theme for the TV Asahi show Future Tracks. It was also used as the promotional song for Kirin's "Hyōketsu Kajū" beer and for the karaoke company Daiichikosho.

None of the single's b-sides were used as promotional tracks.

== Track listing ==
CD
No.	Title	Lyrics	Music	Length
1.	"scene one. Open your eyes. Free is music"	LISA	LISA	0:22
2.	"Babylon no Kiseki" (バビロンの奇跡 / Miracle of Babylon)	LISA	Tokyo Ska Paradise Orchestra	3:30
3.	"scene two. Close your eyes. Set yourself free."	LISA	Ryuichiro Yamaki	2:16
4.	"Ienakute mo..." (言えなくても / Even if I can't say it)	LISA	LISA	4:10
5.	"Ienakute mo..." (Instrumental)		LISA	4:11
6.	"Babylon no Kiseki" (Instrumental)		Tokyo Ska Paradise Orchestra	3:31

== Release history ==
Region	Date	Format	Distributing Label
Japan	May 29, 2002	CD	Rhythm Zone
Taiwan	June 5, 2002	CD	Avex Taiwan
