= Makai =

Japanese house DJ (born 1979)

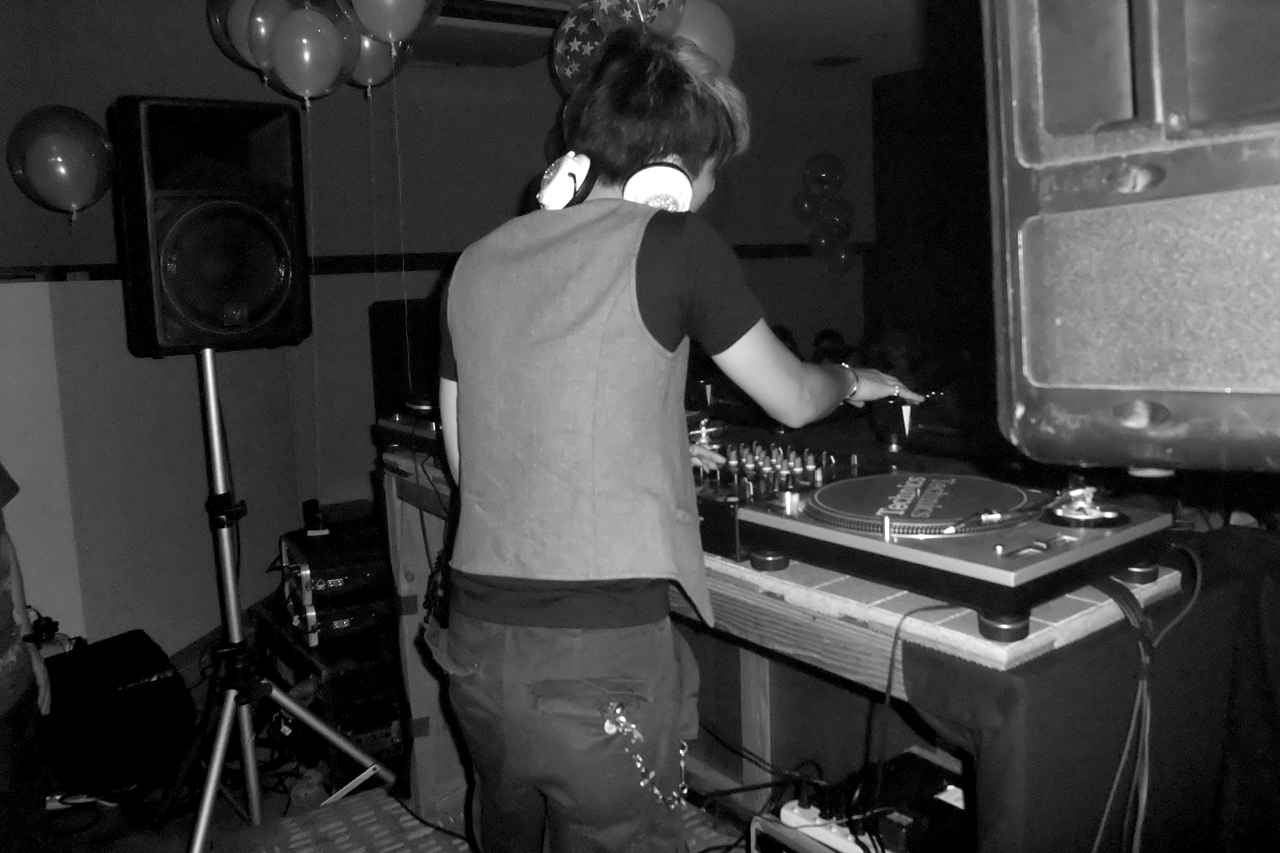
- Guest DJ: MAKAI

Background information
- Born: 27 August 1979 (age 45); Fukuoka Prefecture, Japan
- Genres: J-Pop, house, dance
- Occupation: DJ
- Years active: 1992–present
- Labels: Frontier (Gate Records) (2005–2007); BMG Japan (2008–2009); Universal (2010-present)
- Website: www.makai.tv

Makai (born 27 August 1979, stylized as MAKAI) is a Japanese house DJ. He is well known for his collaborations with Japanese vocalists, such as "Garden of Love" with Thelma Aoyama, which topped the iTunes Japan internal charts.

== Discography ==
=== Studio albums ===
Year	Album Information	Chart positions	Total sales
2005	Frontier: Released: 9 February 2005; Label: Gate Records (GAGH-0013); Formats: CD	237	1,700
2007	Stay True: Released: 14 February 2007; Label: Gate Records (GAGH-0032); Formats: CD	73	7,300
2008	Garden: Released: 5 March 2008; Label: BMG Japan (BVCR-17060); Formats: CD, digital download	43	21,000
2008	Stars: Released: 24 September 2008; Label: BMG Japan (BVCR-11121); Formats: CD, digital download	32	12,000
2010	Love Lite: Released: 28 April 2010; Label: Universal (UPCH-1771); Formats: CD, digital download	TBA	TBA

=== Other albums ===
Year	Album Information	Chart positions	Total sales
2008	Alive: Production compilation album; Only released at HMV; Released: 9 February 2005; Label: U'S Music (USM-016); Formats: CD	—	—
2009	Legend: Cover album; Released: 25 March 2009; Label: BMG Japan (BVCR-17076); Formats: CD	115	3,000
2010	Virtual Party: Remix album; Released: 24 March 2010; Label: BMG Japan (BVCR-17076); Formats: CD	—	—
