= Taku Takahashi =

Japanese DJ, record producer (born 1974)

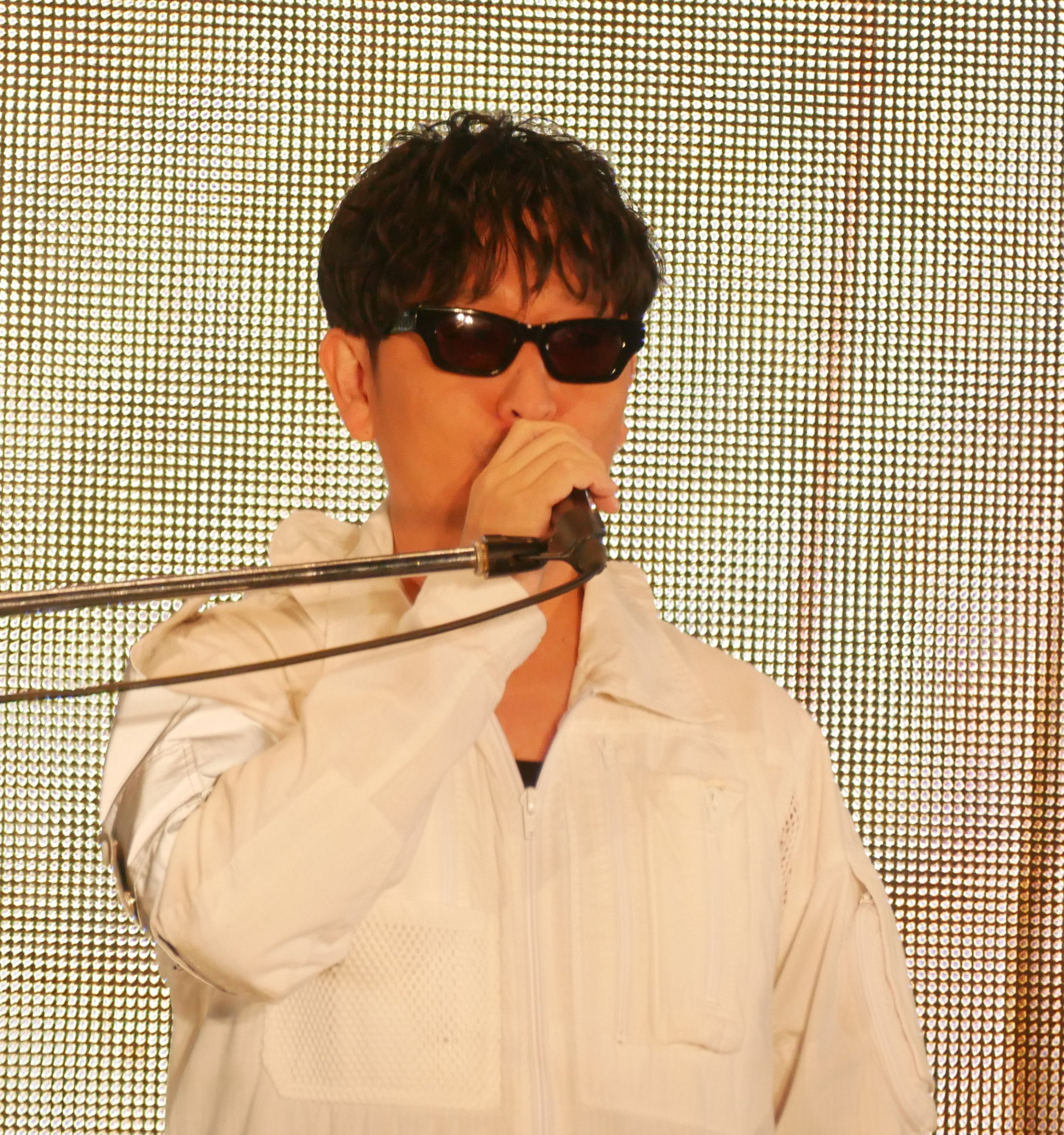
- Takahashi performing in 2019

Background information
- Also known as: Taku, Startak
- Born: 29 March 1974 (age 52); Yokohama, Japan
- Genres: Hip hop; electronic
- Occupations: DJ; record producer
- Years active: 1997–present
- Labels: Rhythm Zone; Tachytelic Records; Tachytelic Records; TCY Recordings

Taku Takahashi (高橋 拓, Takahashi Taku; born 29 March 1974; stylized as ☆Taku Takahashi) is a Japanese DJ and record producer who debuted in 1997 as a producer of the hip hop group M-Flo. The group rose to prominence in the early 2000s, with hit singles such as "How You Like Me Now?" and "Come Again." Takahashi was also a member of Avex's 20th anniversary dance music project Ravex, and has produced songs for musicians such as Crystal Kay, Ami Suzuki and Rie Fu, and remixes for Hikaru Utada and Ayumi Hamasaki. He formed the record labels Tachytelic Records and TCY Recording.

Taku Takahashi has occasionally rapped in his songs, such as on M-Flo's songs "Get On!" and "The Rhyme Brokers," and occasionally sung vocals ("I Wanna Be Down," "Love Long and Prosper", "Toxic Sweet").

== Biography ==
Taku Takahashi grew up in Yokohama, with his father employed in the construction industry. He attended high school in Tokyo, at St. Mary's International School, along with Verbal. In 1992, the pair formed a rap rock band called N.M.D. in 1992, in which Takahashi wrote the music and performed the drums. The band received many offers from major record labels after their live performances, however as Verbal did not see being a rapper as a practical career, these offers were turned down. The pair went their separate ways after high school, with Takahashi travelling to Beverly Hills, Los Angeles in 1994, attending Occidental College, and Verbal to Boston. Takahashi tried majoring in physics, philosophy and Asian Studies with little success. He enrolled in a local music school, beginning his career as a DJ and songwriter.

Takahashi returned to Japan in the mid-1990s, and formed a musical unit with a female vocalist, called Love Soul. After sending a demo tape of this group to Artimage management, Takahashi met Masaji Asakawa from the DJ group GTS. Takahashi began producing music full-time, and in 1998 recorded a cover of Barbra Streisand's "The Way We Were" with Verbal when he returned to Japan for winter break. This song, followed by "Been So Long," featuring vocals from Lisa, was well received by Asakawa, leading the trio to form the group M-Flo, officially debuting in 1999. The group's first release, "The Tripod E.P.," debuted in the top 10 on the Japanese singles chart. The group achieved great success in 2000 and 2001 with the songs "How You Like Me Now?" and "Come Again," with the former selling more than 220,000 copies, and the latter approximately 390,000 copies. The band's second album, Expo Expo, debuted at #4 on the charts.

In 2002, Lisa left M-Flo to follow a solo career, causing the band to begin releasing albums with a variety of famous vocalists. This led to Takahashi working on collaborations with a variety of artists. His first notable produced singles were Crystal Kay's "Hard to Say" and "Boyfriend (Part II)" in 2002/2003. At the same time, he created a production label, Tachytelic Records. An audition was held to find vocalists for Takahashi to produce, with the grand winner being songwriter Emi Hinouchi. Between 2002 and 2003, the label produced six releases: Emi Hinouchi's first four singles and debut album, along with a DJ mix tape created by Takahashi called Tachytelic Night: Welcomes You to the Far East. However, none of the releases were successful, with all of the releases charting under the #100 mark on Oricon charts. The label continued to promote events, such as the regular Tachytelic Night DJ set events, and Takahashi produced the Pro Evolution Soccer 6 theme song, Ukatrats FC's "Win and Shine." However, after 2006 the label ceased to exist.

Takahashi continued working full-time with M-Flo until mid 2007, when the tour for the group's fifth album Cosmicolor finished and M-Flo ceased regular activities. Since then, the group released a string of compilation albums, such as greatest hit albums and outside collaborative work compilation albums. Takahashi has regularly produced songs and remixes for musicians, including several Western artists (Calvin Harris, Lady Sovereign, The Ting Tings). He has participated in many DJ events, including his self-produced Orthosync events, and many House Nation events. In 2008, Takahashi became a member of Ravex, a three DJ group formed for the 20th anniversary of the Avex music group. The group's resulting 2009 album, Trax, was much like M-Flo's later albums, featuring a collection of vocalists from across Avex record labels.

In 2010, Taku Takahashi launched his second record label, TCY Recording, featuring dance music artists such as TeddyLoid and Hoshina Anniversary. He found most of them on MySpace music. He also began working as a music director, for the Gainax animated series Panty & Stocking with Garterbelt, which began airing in October 2010.

In 2011, Taku Takahashi filled in for Kissy Sellout's radio show on BBC Radio 1 as part of "Jaguar Skills and His Amazing Friends." His ten-minute mix included remixes of songs from his time with m-flo and the Godzilla theme.

== Discography ==
=== Albums ===
| Year | Album Information | Oricon albums charts | Reported sales |
|---|---|---|---|
| 2003 | Tachytelic Night: Welcomes You to the Far East: Mix-tape; Released: 5 March 2003; Label: Tachytelic Records (CTCR-14243); Formats: CD, digital download | 138 | 3,900 |
| 2010 | TCY Rec Special Pack EP Vol. 1: Compilation of TCY Recording recordings; Released: 23 June 2010; Label: Artimage; Formats: Digital download | — | — |
| 2010 | TCY Rec Special Pack EP Vol. 2: Compilation of TCY Recording recordings; Released: 1 September 2010; Label: Artimage; Formats: Digital download | — | — |
| 2010 | Panty & Stocking with Garterbelt: The Original Soundtrack: Panty & Stocking with Garterbelt soundtrack, performed with TCY Crew; Released: 29 December 2010; Label: Flying Dog (VTCL-60236); Formats: CD, digital download | 10 | 30,000 |
| 2011 | After 5 Vol. 1: Mix-tape, performed as The Suitboys a.k.a. Taku Takahashi; Released: 20 April 2011; Label: Rhythm Zone (RZCD-46824); Formats: CD, digital download | 88 | 1,200 |
| 2011 | TCY Rec Special Pack Vol. 3: Compilation of TCY Recording recordings; Released: 25 May 2011; Label: Artimage; Formats: Digital download | — | — |
| 2012 | TCY Rec Special Pack Vol. 4: Compilation of TCY Recording recordings; Released: 22 February 2012; Label: Artimage; Formats: Digital download | — | — |
| 2013 | EDM World Presented by ☆Taku Takahashi: Mix-tape; Released: 6 March 2013; Label: Farm Records (FARM-0325); Formats: CD, digital download | — | — |

=== Produced singles ===
| Release | Artist | Title | Notes | Chart positions | | Oricon sales | Album |
| Release | Artist | Title | Notes | Oricon Singles Charts | Billboard Japan Hot 100* | Oricon sales | Album |
|---|---|---|---|---|---|---|---|
| 1999 | Kirari | "Last Piece" | Music, arrangement | 26 | — | 54,000 | Kaleidolife |
| 2000 | K. | "Under the Same Sky" | Music, arrangement | — | — | — | Kaleidolife |
| 2002 | Crystal Kay | "Hard to Say" | Lyrics, music, arrangement | 26 | — | 45,000 | Almost Seventeen |
| 2002 | Emi Hinouchi | "Magic/World" | Lyrics, music, arrangement | 112 | — | 3,900 | Dramatiques |
| 2003 | Crystal Kay | "Boyfriend (Part II)" | Arrangement | 23 | — | 33,000 | 4 Real |
| 2003 | Emi Hinouchi | "Crying" | Arrangement | 134 | — | 2,000 | Dramatiques |
| 2003 | Emi Hinouchi | "Freak!" | Arrangement | 192 | — | 600 | Dramatiques |
| 2003 | Emi Hinouchi | "Painful" | Arrangement | 135 | — | 700 | Dramatiques |
| 2006 | Melody | "See You..." | Music | 19 | — | 13,000 | Be as One |
| 2006 | Ukatrats FC | "Win and Shine" | Co-wrote lyrics/music, produced group | 48 | — | 6,000 | We Love We [We Love Winning Eleven] |
| 2006 | Kozue Ayuse | "Kimi no Yasashisa" (君の優しさ; "Your Kindness") | Production | 63 | — | 3,400 | A♥K |
| 2008 | Rie Fu | "Romantic" | Co-wrote music, arrangement | 100 | 66 | 800 | Urban Romantic |
| 2009 | Sowelu | "Material World" | Co-wrote music, co-arranged | 106 | 92 | 900 | Sowelu the Best 2002—2009 |
| 2009 | Ami Suzuki | "Reincarnation" | Co-wrote music, co-arranged | 42 | — | 3,700 | Ami Selection |
| 2010 | Minmi | "Hibiscus" (ハイビスカス, Haibisukasu) | Co-arranged | 27 | 30 | 7,000 | Mother |
| 2012 | Miliyah Kato | "Heart Beat" | | 14 | 8 | 26,000 | True Lovers |
| 2013 | Ayumi Hamasaki | "Merry-Go-Round" | Co-wrote music, co-arranged | 5 | 13 | 37,000 | Colours |
| 2018 | V6 | "KEEP GOING" | Lyrics, Music, arrangement | 2 | — | — | Very6 BEST |
| 2018 | Kizuna AI | "mirai" | Music, arrangement | — | — | — | hello, world |
| 2019 | EXID | "Bad Girl For You" | Music, arrangement | 14 | 95 | 10,000 | B.L.E.S.S.E.D |
| 2021 | Doberman Infinity | "konomama" | Music, arrangement | 29 | — | — | 6 -Six- |
| 2021 | BE:FIRST | "Shining One" | Music, arrangement | 3 | 2 | — | BE:1 |
| 2022 | DEEN | "mirror ball" | Music, arrangement | — | — | — | Digital single |
| 2022 | Emi Kumamoto | "I'm Not Just A Girl" | Music, arrangement | — | — | — | Digital single |
*Japan Hot 100 established February 2008.

=== Other appearances ===
Below are songs featuring input from Takahashi away from M-Flo (i.e. without Verbal, or without Lisa circa 1998–2002).

| Release | Artist | Title | Notes | Album |
|---|---|---|---|---|
| 1999 | Double | "Make Me Happy" | Music, arrangement, piano | "Shake" |
| 1999 | J Soul Brothers | "Follow Me (M-Flo "Lab of Soul" Remix)" | Arrangement | "J Soul Brothers" |
| 2000 | K. | "Little Wish" | Arrangement | Kaleidolife |
| 2000 | Kirari | "Kokoro Yasumete" (心やすめて; "Take a Holiday for My Heart") | Music, arrangement | Kirariddim |
| 2000 | Cleopatra | "Yes, This Party's Going Right (M-Flo Mix)" | Arrangement | Steppin' Out |
| 2001 | Ayumi Hamasaki | "Wishing (Taku's Chemistry Mix)" | | "You" (12 cm single, re-release) |
| 2001 | Hikaru Utada | "Distance (M-Flo Remix)" | | "Final Distance" (single) |
| 2001 | K. | "Sora no Mukō e" (空のむこうへ; "To the Other Side of the Sky") | Music, arrangement | Keynote |
| 2001 | K. | "Saigo no Cyder" (最後のサイダー; "Final Cyder") | Music, arrangement | Keynote |
| 2002 | Taku Takahashi | "Modulation" | Opening theme song | Mohōhan: The Copy Cat Original Motion Picture Soundtrack |
| 2002 | Taku Takahashi | "Peace no Dilemma" (ピースのジレンマ, Pīsu no Jirenma; "The Dilemma of Peace") | Insert song | Mohōhan: The Copy Cat Original Motion Picture Soundtrack |
| 2003 | Amin | "Shanghai Boogie Woogie (Chāosù Jìnhuà de Táiběi Remix)" (上海Boogie Woogie (超速進化的台北リミックス) "Shanghai Boogie Woogie (Really Fast Evolving Taipei Remix)") | Arrangement, with Asuka Sakai | "Ōki na Kawa to Chiisa na Koi" (single) |
| 2003 | Mic Banditz | "What's Your Secret?" | Arrangement | Sixth Sense |
| 2003 | Crystal Kay | "Kataomoi" (片想い; "One Way Love") | Music, arrangement | 4 Real |
| 2003 | Emi Hinouchi | "Hey Boy..." | Arrangement | Dramatiques |
| 2004 | Ryohei Yamamoto | "Let It Flow" | Co-wrote music | Take Over |
| 2006 | Crystal Kay | "I Know" | Arrangement | Call Me Miss... |
| 2006 | Jin & Kana | "Go West -020609 Tachytelic Remix-" | | Ultras 2006 |
| 2006 | Taku Takahashi | "(Is This the Way To) Amarillo" | | Fuji TV Soccer Legend 2006 |
| 2007 | Marcia | "Amor...Saudade (Versao em Portugues) (Tachytelic Remixed)" | | Upper's Flava Remixes of Watanabe Hit Tune |
| 2008 | Lisa | "Bad Men!" | | Ready to Disco |
| 2008 | The Ting Tings | "That's Not My Name (Taku Takahashi Mix)" | | We Started Nothing (Japanese Edition) |
| 2008 | Boo | "French Girl!!" | | — |
| 2008 | Yoshika | "Goodbye to You" | | "Stand Up" (single) |
| 2008 | Ryukyudisko | "Yume no Future featuring Kotomi (Time Is Dissing Me Remix)" (夢のFUTURE; "Dream Future") | | "Top of the Island" (single) |
| 2008 | Manabu Iwamura | "Summer Carnival (Taku Takahashi Remix)" | | Woman |
| 2008 | Coldfeet | "Intro to Ten" | Narration | Ten |
| 2009 | Anna Tsuchiya mush up Taku Takahashi | "Sweet Rishi Boy" | Music, arrangement | "Brave Vibration" (single) |
| 2009 | Calvin Harris | "I'm Not Alone (Taku Takahashi Remix)" | | Ready for the Weekend (Japanese Edition) |
| 2009 | Lady Sovereign | "Jigsaw (Taku Takahashi Remix)" | | Jigsaw (Japanese Edition) |
| 2009 | Crystal Kay | "Over and Over" | Music, arrangement | Best of Crystal Kay |
| 2009 | Coldfeet | "Billie Jean (Taku Takahashi Remix)" | Michael Jackson cover | Coldfeet Presents MJ the Tour |
| 2009 | Sawa | "Swimming Dancing" | Arrangement | Swimming Dancing (EP) |
| 2009 | Sawa | "World-Wide Tea Party" | Arrangement | Swimming Dancing (EP) |
| 2010 | Ultras | "Ganbare Nippon! (020609 Tachytelic Remix)" (元気ニッポン!; "Go Japan!") | | Ultras 2010 |
| 2010 | Masterlink | "Traveling (Taku Remix)" | | "Traveling" (single) |
| 2010 | Miliyah Kato | "Endless Love" | Arrangement | Heaven |
| 2010 | Taku Takahashi | "What's Your Medium?" | | M-Flo Inside: Works Best IV |
| 2010 | Discothèque | "Goodbye featuring Blanc. (Taku Takahashi Remix)" | | Goodbye |
| 2011 | Revolutions | "SP Break the Wall" featuring V6, Taku Takahashi | Composition and arrangement | — |
| 2011 | Rhymester | "Flashback, Natsu (Taku Takahashi aka The Suitboys Remix)" (フラッシュバック、夏。; "Flashback, Summer") | | "Flashback, Natsu" (single) |
| 2011 | Sowelu | "I Want U To..." featuring Wise | Music, arrangement | Let Me... |
| 2011 | The Lifelines | "The Lifelines" | Production | Secret Diary |
| 2011 | Momoiro Clover Z | "Santa-san (DJ Taku's Christmas A-men Breaks)" (サンタさん; "Mr. Santa") | | "Shiroi Kaze" (single) |
| 2011 | Taku Takahashi | "Ebi Sukui" | Hyouge Mono third opening theme, unreleased. | — |
| 2012 | Iconiq | "Ladies" | Production | — |
| 2012 | Passion Pit | "Take a Walk (Taku Takahashi & El Poco Maro Remix)" | | Gossamer (Japanese edition) |
| 2012 | Meg | "Southpaw" | Production | Wear I Am |
| 2013 | Taku Takahashi | "Searching" | | Biblia Koshodō no Jiken Techō Original Soundtrack |
| 2013 | Taku Takahashi | "Biblorelo" | | Biblia Koshodō no Jiken Techō Original Soundtrack |
| 2013 | Minmi | "Sakura (Eien) (Tachytelic Remix)" (さくら ～永遠～; "Cherry Blossoms (Forever)") featuring Shōnan no Kaze | | "Sakura (Eien)" (single) |
| 2014 | Mika Nakashima & Miliyah Kato | "Fighter (Tachytelic World Cup Brazil 2014 Remix)" | | One Love, One Rhythm – The 2014 FIFA World Cup Official Album |
| 2015 | TeddyLoid | "All You Ever Need feat. ☆Taku Takahashi (m-flo)" | Vocals | Silent Planet |
| 2017 | DJ Taku aka ☆Taku Takahashi | "Last Century Melancholic" (ラストセンチュリーメランコリック) | Music, arrangement | beatmania IIDX 25 CANNON BALLERS |
| 2017 | ☆Taku Takahashi feat. Emyli | "Island" | | FREQUENCY BLITZ 5 |
| 2018 | Raif & ☆Taku Takahashi | "OOLONG HiGH" | | OOLONG HiGH |
| 2018 | ☆Taku Takahashi (m-flo) | "Shimajirou's English Fun Fun Time!" (しまじろうのえいごでFun Fun Time!) | Music Production | J:COM |
| 2018 | ☆Taku Takahashi (m-flo) | "TOKYO2020 PEOPLE" | | 2020 Summer Olympics Image Movie |
| 2018 | NEWS | "AVALON" | Composition, Arrangement | Epcotia |
| 2018 | NEWS | "IT'S YOU" | Composition, Arrangement | Epcotia |
| 2018 | NEWS | "Thunder" | Arrangement | Epcotia |
| 2018 | Lyn | "Last Surprise (☆Taku Takahashi Remix)" | | Persona 5: Dancing in Starlight |
| 2018 | V6 | "TL" | Composition, Arrangement | Crazy Rays/KEEP GOING |
| 2018 | Da-iCE | "Blackjack" | Composition, Arrangement | Bet |
| 2018 | ☆Taku Takahashi (m-flo) + YUC'e + hy4_4yh + Micau Kamura | "LINEUP TOUR 2018 (Dance Remix)" | Production | PlayStation 4 Lineup Music Video |
| 2018 | ☆Taku Takahashi (m-flo, block.fm) | "The Best of Both Worlds" | | beatmania IIDX 26 ROOTAGE |
| 2018 | Tokyo Performance Doll | "Collection feat. ☆Taku Takahashi" | Composition, Arrangement | Hey, Girls! |
| 2018 | ☆Taku Takahashi (m-flo, block.fm) | "Various BGM" | | Project Tokyo Dolls Mobile Game |
2023
| 2023 | Azumi Waki, Marika Kōno, Machico, Tomoyo Takayanagi, Hitomi Ueda, Saori Onishi, Sora Tokui, Naomi Ōzora, Afumi Hashi, Hitomi Sasaki, Sachika Misawa, Yurina Amami, Hikari Kubota, Hikaru Tono, Hina Tachibana, Hinaki Yano, Ruriko Noguchi, Ayumi Hinohara, Kanna Nakamura | "We are DREAMERS!! (Taku Takahashi Remix)" | Arrangement | "Umamusume Pretty Derby" WINNING LIVE Remix ALBUM "Paka Age Mix" Vol. 1 |
| 2023 | @onefive | "F.A.F.O" | Production | Classy Crush |
| 2025 | @onefive | "Magical Irony" | Production | Doh Yoh |
| 2026 | @onefive | "Muteki Atashi Mōdo" (無敵☆アタシモード) | Production | Sakuraization |
