= Lisa (Japanese musician, born 1974) =

Japanese musician (born 1974)

- 成田・エリザベス・サクラ
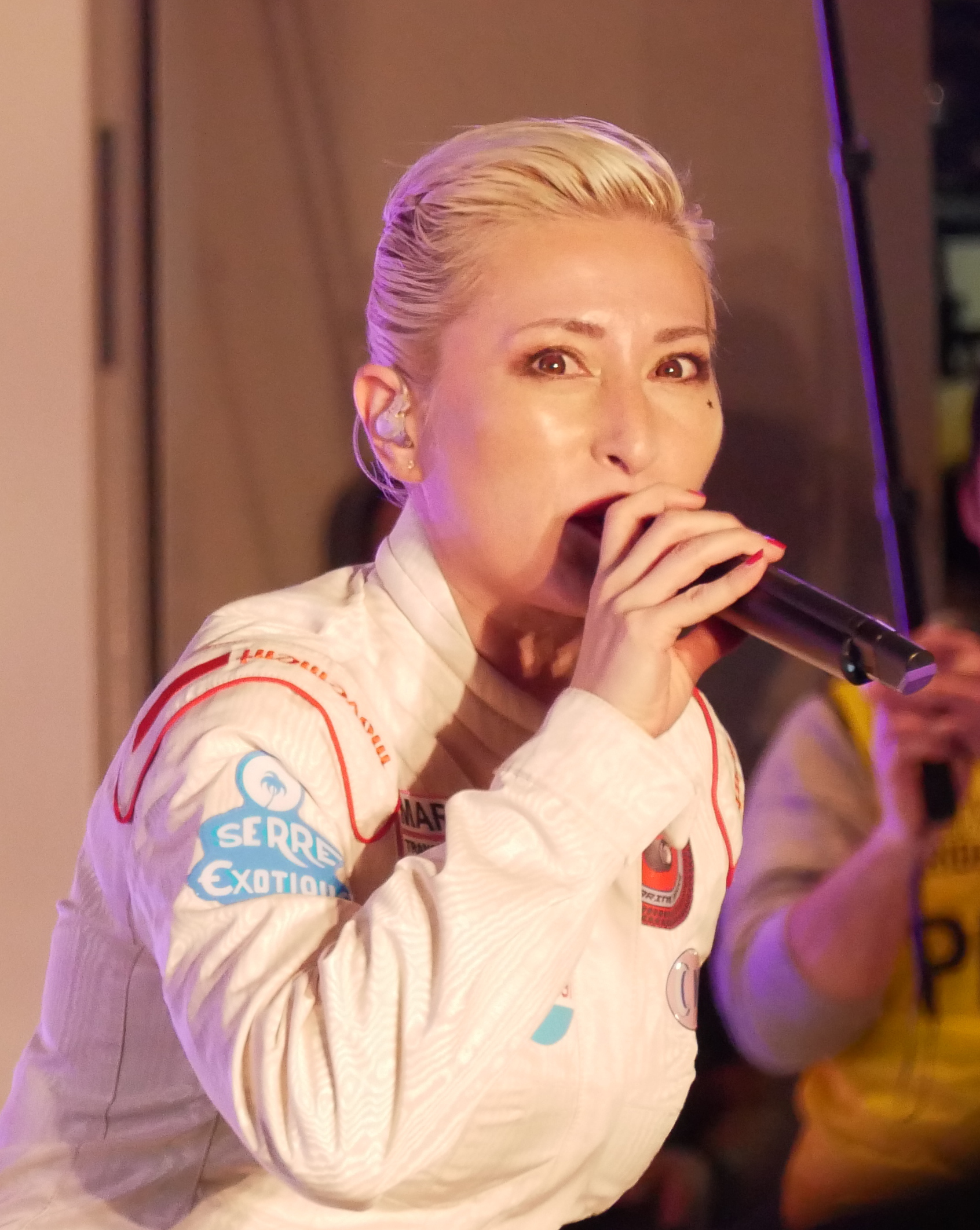
- Born: Elizabeth Sakura Narita; 26 October 1974 (age 52); Tokyo, Japan
- Occupations: Singer; songwriter; producer
- Musical career
- Genres: J-pop; R&B
- Years active: 1993–present
- Label: Rhythm Zone
- Member of: M-Flo, Ram Jam World, Home Grown, Los Kalibres
- Website: avex.jp/lisa

Elizabeth Sakura Narita (成田・エリザベス・サクラ, Narita Erizabesu Sakura; born 26 October 1974), better known by her stage name Lisa (stylized as LISA), is a Japanese singer, songwriter and producer. In 1998, she debuted as a member of the Japanese urban contemporary group M-Flo with Verbal and Taku Takahashi. In 2002, she left the band in order to pursue a solo project and released seven albums as a soloist. In December 2017, she rejoined as a member of M-Flo.

== Biography ==
=== Early life, M-Flo ===
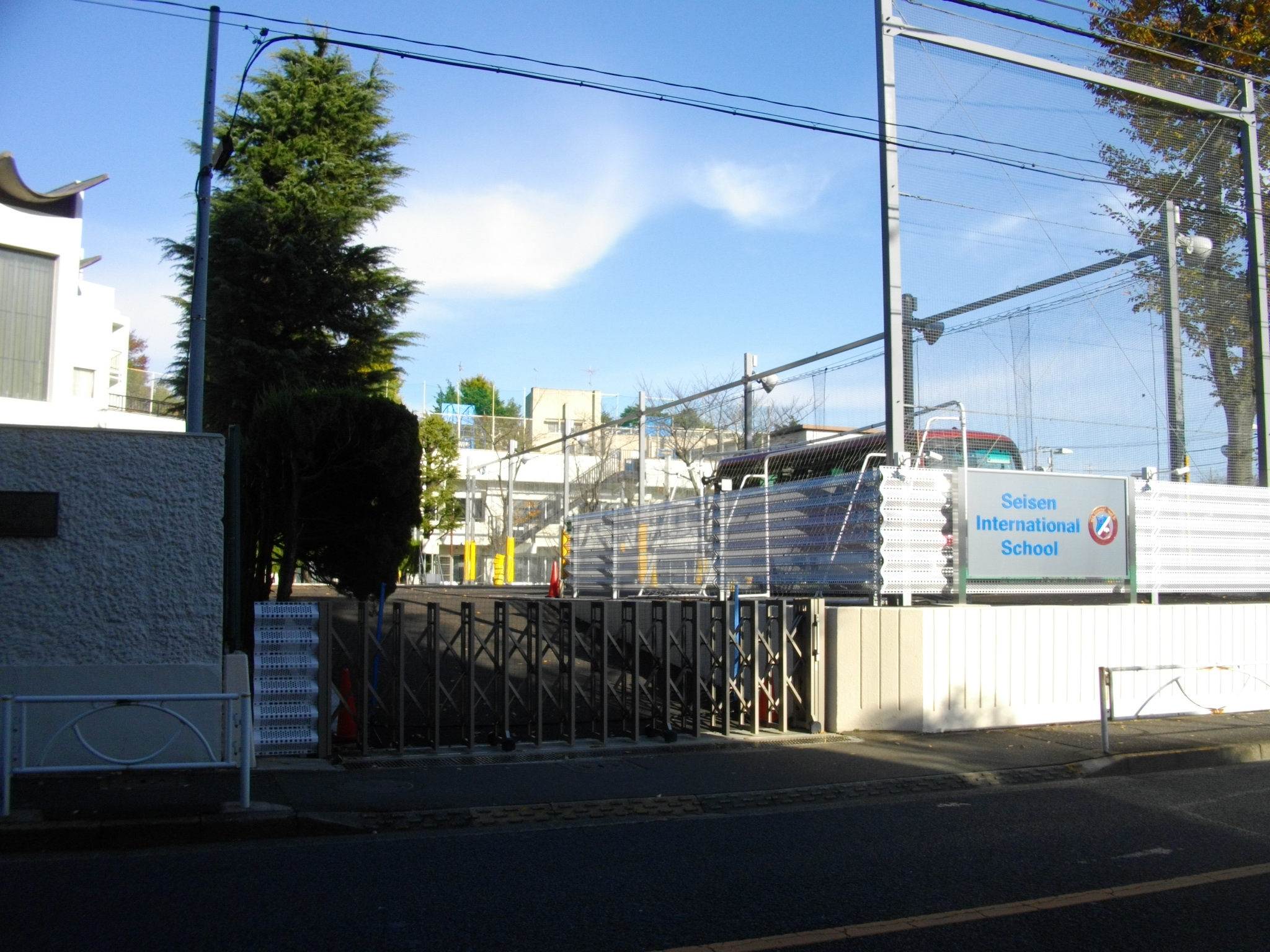
Lisa was inspired to sing in the choir of Seisen International School (pictured).

Lisa was born in Tokyo on October 26, 1974, to a Colombian mother and Japanese father. As a child, Lisa was often bullied due to her mixed race heritage. She attended two international schools in Tokyo: the Seisen International School and the American School in Japan. Lisa found solace in music in her school choir, which grew her interest in music and was often the only reason she would come to school.

At the age of 18, Lisa debuted as a singer, with the single "Out of Cry" (1993) released through Tokuma Japan Communications. In 1994, Lisa collaborated with former Mute Beat keyboardist and producer Hiroyuki Asamoto's project Ram Jam World under the moniker Chica Colombiana, releasing an album of Latin and reggae inspired music in English, Spanish, and Japanese. Later in 1994, Lisa changed labels for her solo career to Kitty Enterprises and released the single "Sea of the Stars", which was used as the third opening theme song for the anime Legend of the Galactic Heroes. Lisa continued to work with Ram Jam World, including on their album Rough and Ready (1997) and extended play Sekai (1998). Between 1993 and 1998, Lisa changed management companies and music labels 10 times, and found that the companies were more interested in providing her songs written by veteran songwriters than showing any interest in the music she wrote, which Lisa found disheartening.

In 1998, Lisa began collaborating with Taku Takahashi and Verbal, two former classmates of hers from high school. Takahashi and Verbal held dance parties, which Lisa used to attend and improvise vocals during Takahashi and Verbal's performances. In 1998, Takahashi began professionally working as a producer and a remixer, after being pushed towards making music by entering a TV music competition. Takahashi's first project was to release a cover of Barbra Streisand's "The Way We Were", featuring vocals by Ceybil Jeffries and Verbal. One of the group's early songs was "Been So Long", which included Lisa as a featured vocalist, was highly praised by Masaji Asakawa from the DJ group GTS, which lead to the formation of M-Flo as a three-person group. "The Way We Were" was released as an independent single and sold out almost immediately. Because of the strong response to the single, they asked Lisa if she wanted to join their project as a full-time member. "Been So Long" was released as an independent single in December 1998. After promotion though radio stations such as J-Wave, the single was even more successful, which led to the band signing a contract with Avex Trax, and in 1999 the group released their major label debut single The Tripod E.P. (featuring "Been So Long" as one of the single's A-sides). The single was a success, reaching number nine on the Oricon singles chart.

Between 1999 and 2001, the band saw great success with their albums Planet Shining (2000) and Expo Expo (2001) and singles such as "LOT (Love or Truth)" (1999) (the theme song of the Ai Kato-starring drama Best Friend), "How You Like Me Now?" (2000) and "Come Again" (2001). Songs from the sessions of these albums featured vocals by Lisa on most songs, including three songs featuring Lisa alone without rap from Verbal ("Come Back to Me" (1999), "One Sugar Dream" (2000) and "Yours Only," (2001)).

=== Solo debut ===
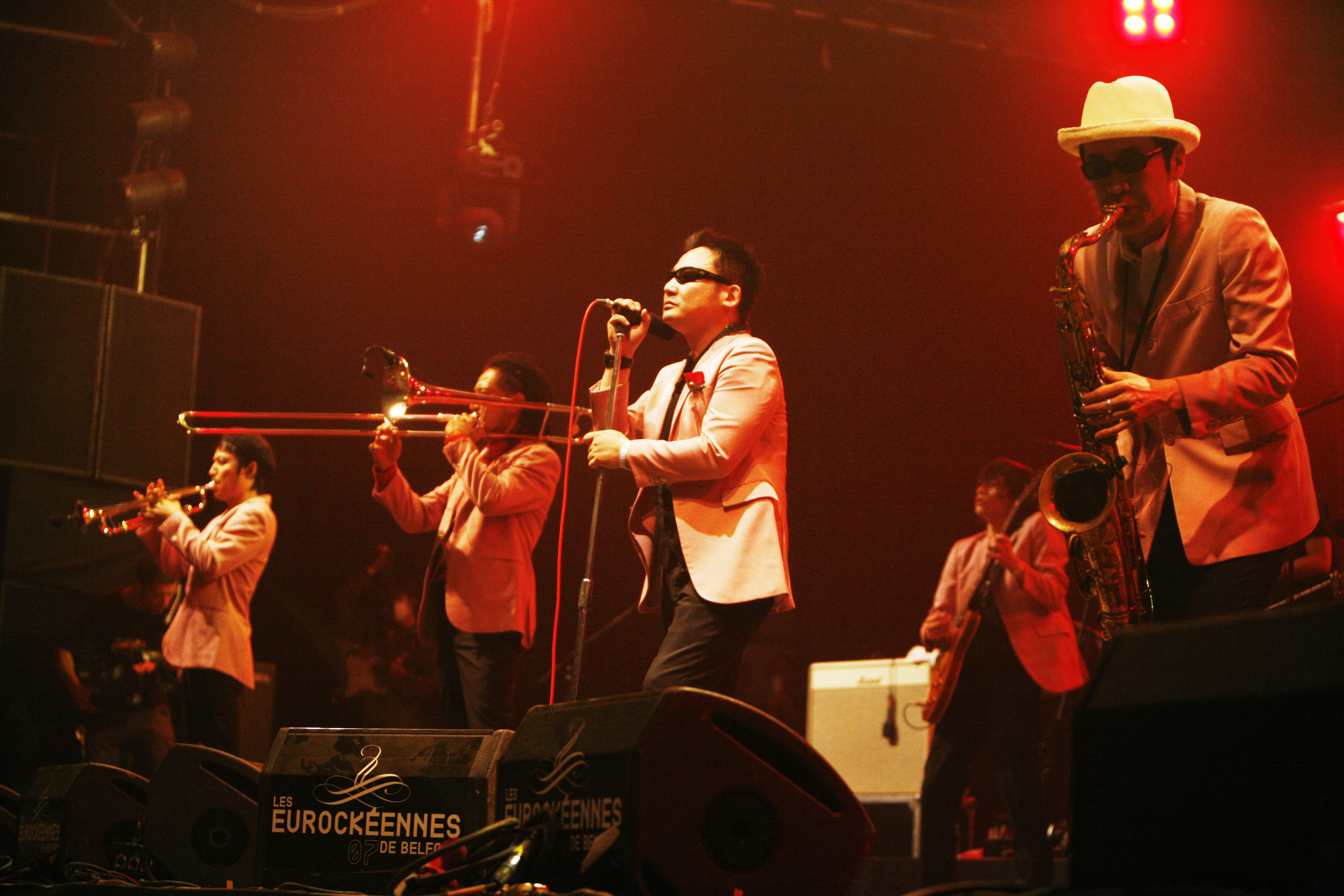
Lisa collaborated with Tokyo Ska Paradise Orchestra for her single "Babylon no Kiseki" (2003).

In January 2002, Lisa released her solo debut single "Move On", which reached number seven on Oricon's single charts, and is currently Lisa's most sold single. In April of the same year she announced that she was leaving M-Flo to focus on herself as an artist and as a singer-songwriter, deciding to do this at the peak of M-Flo's popularity. In late May, Lisa released her first single away from M-Flo, "Babylon no Kiseki", a rock collaboration with Tokyo Ska Paradise Orchestra. In April 2003, Lisa released her debut album Juicy Music, which reached number five on Oricon's albums chart. Between 2003 and 2004, Lisa wrote three songs for R&B singer Koda Kumi's albums Grow into One (2003) and Feel My Mind (2004). Koda, alongside pop/rap group Heartsdales, was also featured on Lisa's single "Switch", which was the leading single from Lisa's second album Gratitude (2004).

M-Flo's albums subsequent to Lisa's departure were inspired by American hip-hop group The Neptunes' method of collaborating with vocalists, while continuing to release music under their own name. Even after Lisa left the group, the trio remained friends, and in 2005 for the group's album Beat Space Nine, Lisa returned to work with M-Flo on the song "Tripod Baby". Lisa agreed to sing on the album due to a gap in her schedule, and recorded the song together with Takahashi and Verbal in June 2005, two months before the album's release. For the song, Verbal stated that they had wanted to recapture the "groove" of working together as a three-person band.

In 2006, Lisa released an R&B concept album God Sista (2006), as well as her third original album Elizabeth (2006). Neither release charted in the top 40 in Japan. In 2007, Lisa's first greatest hits album Lisabest: Mission on Earth 9307 reached number 28, her first top 40 release since 2004.

Between 2008 and 2009, Lisa released the luxury disco series: two extended plays and one studio album of primarily dance music, culminating in her fourth original album Disco Volante. During this period, Lisa collaborated with the members of M-Flo often: "Bad Men!" (2008) and "Falling for You..." (2009) from the luxury disco series was co-written with M-Flo member, and Lisa featured on M-Flo's songs "Love Comes and Goes" from Award Supernova: Loves Best (2008) and "Sound Boy Thriller" from MF10: 10th Anniversary Best (2009). Lisa was a featured vocalist for a song the Ravex project (a dance music project collaboration between Shinichi Osawa, Tomoyuki Tanaka and Takahashi), and Lisa and Takahashi worked together co-writing music: "Sweet Rishi Boy" (2009) for rock musician Anna Tsuchiya, and two songs from the 2010 anime Panty & Stocking with Garterbelt's soundtrack.

In 2012, Lisa released her studio album Family, which featured collaborations with Jamosa and Kotaro Oshio; the release did not chart in the top 300 albums. After this album, Lisa's contract with her management company Artimage expired.

=== M-Flo revival ===
In 2016, Lisa returned to music, collaborating with Taku Takahashi on several projects: Avex Nico presents Kid's Songs Vol. 1, a Takahashi-produced album of children's songs sung in English, two songs co-written songs for the boy band NEWS, and an appearance on the drama Hito wa Mitame ga 100 Percent original soundtrack. In 2016 and 2017, Lisa started performing concerts alongside Takahashi and Verbal. As they all enjoyed the experience, they decided to reunite as a three-member band, and in March 2018 released "The Tripod EP 2".

== Artistry ==
Lisa considers Cyndi Lauper, Madonna and Whitney Houston her musical influences. For her solo debut, Lisa was inspired by Madonna's focus on overseeing all aspects of music production.

== Discography ==
- Juicy Music (2003)
- Gratitude (2004)
- Melody Circus (2005)
- God Sista (2006)
- Elizabeth (2006)
- Disco Volante (2009)
- Family (2012)
