= Switch (Lisa song) =

"Switch/I Only Want to Be with You"
- "Switch" / "I Only Want to Be with You" cover artwork.

Single by Lisa featuring Koda Kumi & Heartsdales

from the album Gratitude
- Released: 21 April 2004
- Genre: R&B, pop, J-pop
- Label: Rhythm Zone
- Songwriters: LISA, Heartsdales, Ryuichiro Yamaki

Lisa singles chronology
"My Dearest" (2004)	"Switch/I Only Want to Be with You" (2004)	"So Beautiful" (2004)

Koda Kumi singles chronology
"Crazy 4 U" (2004)	"Switch/I Only Want to Be with You" (2004)	"Love & Honey" (2004)

Heartsdales singles chronology
"Candy Pop" (2003)	"Switch" (2004)	"I See You" (2004)

Music video
- "Switch" on YouTube

"Switch/I Only Want to Be with You" (stylized as SWITCH/I ONLY WANT TO BE WITH YOU) is a double A-side by ex-m-flo vocalist LISA. The single charted at #43 on the Oricon charts and became the last single by LISA to chart in the top fifty.

The track "Switch" features the hip-hop sibling duo Heartsdales and singer Koda Kumi, while the track "I Only Want to Be with You" is a cover of the 1953 Dusty Springfield song of the same name.

== Information ==
"Switch/I Only Want to Be with You" is Japanese R&B artist LISA's eleventh single under the Avex sub-label Rhythm Zone. The single charted low on the Oricon Singles Charts, coming in at #43 and selling 3,365 copies within its first week. Despite it being one of her better-selling singles, it would be her last album to chart in the Top 50. Although the single was promoted as a double A-side, only "Switch" garnered a music video.

"Switch" features Koda Kumi and hip-hop duo Heartsdales. All four artists had equal parts in the song, with all four joining in the chorus and the various verses. This was the third time LISA had worked with Koda Kumi, whereas she had written the music and helped with the lyrics on Kumi's song "One" from her studio album Grow into One, and for the song "Magic", which was released one month prior to "Switch/I Only Want to Be with You" on her album Feel My Mind.

The second A-side, "I Only Want to Be with You" is a cover of the 1963 Dusty Springfield song of the same name. LISA would perform more cover songs on a bonus disc released on the corresponding album.

Both songs would be placed on her second studio album Gratitude, with "Switch" on the first CD and "I Only Want to Be with You" on the second CD, which consisted of various cover songs.

"Switch" was utilized as the opening theme for the PlayStation 2 Capcom game Crimson Tears.

== Background & composition ==
"Switch" was written and composed by both LISA and artist Ryuichiro Yamaki, who is best known for his remixes under the stage name "R.Yamaki". Yamaki had previously worked with Koda Kumi several songs, including the remix of her song "Yume with You" and "S.O.S ~sound of silence~." They have also worked with the likes of EXILE" and South Korean boy band TVXQ (known as "Tohoshinki" in Japan). While Yamaki and LISA wrote the song, LISA worked with Heartsdales for the lyrical portion.

"I Only Want to Be with You" was originally written and composed by Mike Hawker and Ivor Raymonde for the debut solo of British singer Dusty Springfield's song of the same name in 1963. However, for LISA's version, Japanese songwriter and performer Satoshi Hidaka performed the piece to update it for modern audiences. Despite being an A-side, the song did not receive a music video on the single or corresponding album. The track would be available on the bonus CD for the album Gratitude.

== Music video ==
Despite being a double A-side, only "Switch" received a music video.

The video for "Switch" carried an overall grunge-theme, which was mostly present in North American media in the late 1980s to early 1990s. Most of the video utilized the green screen, showing a rundown Tokyo at night while showing clips of the Crimson Tears video game. The Heartsdales are first introduced by sitting on the flange of an I-beam and Kumi's introduced in frame on a black background. At no point during the video are all four artists shown together.

== Track listing ==
CD
No.	Title	Lyrics	Music	Arranger(s)	Length
1.	"Switch feat. Koda Kumi & Heartsdales"	LISA • Heartsdales	Ryuichiro Yamaki	LISA • Ryuichiro Yamaki	5:26
2.	"I Only Want to Be with You"	Mike Hawker	Satoshi Hidaka	Ivor Raymonde	3:56
3.	"Switch feat. Koda Kumi & Heartsdales" (Radio Edit)	LISA • Heartsdales	LISA • Ryuichiro Yamaki		4:16
4.	"Switch" (Instrumental)		LISA • Ryuichiro Yamaki		5:27
5.	"I Only Want to Be with You" (Instrumental)		Satoshi Hidaka	Ivor Raymonde	3:56

== Chart history ==
=== Sales ===
- Initial week estimate: 3,365
- Total estimate: 7,410

== Release history ==
Region	Date	Format	Label
Japan	April 21, 2004	CD	Rhythm Zone
Taiwan	April 30, 2004	CD	Avex Taiwan
