= Heartsdales =

Japanese-American hip pop duo

- Origin: New York City, New York, United States
- Genre: Hip pop
- Years active: 2001–2006
- Labels: Espionage Records, Rhythm Zone, Avex Trax
- Members: Rum; Jewels
- Website: Heartsdales' official website at the Wayback Machine (archived February 19, 2009)

Heartsdales was a Japanese-American hip pop duo composed of sisters Yumi Sugiyama (杉山ユミ, Sugiyama Yumi) and Emi Sugiyama (杉山エミ, Sugiyama Emi), known by their stage names Rum and Jewels, respectively.

Yumi was born on December 17, 1981, and Emi on December 4, 1976, in Tokyo, Japan. Their family moved to the Yonkers area of New York right after Yumi was born, due to their father's job as an interior designer. In 1995, the family moved back to Japan, and Yumi attended Tama Art University and Emi attended Keio University.

In summer 2001, Yumi and Emi appeared on the TV audition program Asayan after sending in a demo. They won the competition, and landed a contract with Avex Entertainment. They adopted the name "Heartsdales" as a reference to the hamlet of Hartsdale, New York.

They released their first album, Radioactive, in 2002 under Avex Record's sublabel Cutting Edge. Their first single, "So Tell Me," was ranked 6th on the Oricon music rankings. Since then, they released 6 albums and 14 singles. Artimage is Heartsdales' management office, who also manages other Japanese hip-hop artists such as M-Flo and Double.

On June 22, 2006, Heartsdales announced on their official website that they were going to split up to pursue new endeavors.

== Later career ==
Yumi lives in New York City and has started a design studio, "Studio Yumi," and attended the Parsons The New School for Design completing the program in 2009.

Emi lives in Tokyo.

Yumi announced on her blog that she gave birth to her son weighing 7.7 pounds (3.5 kg) on June 25, 2010.

== Discography ==
=== Albums ===
| # | Information | Release date |
|---|---|---|
| 1st | Radioactive | March 20, 2002 |
| 2nd | Sugar Shine | September 25, 2003 |
| 3rd | Super Star | March 2, 2005 |
| 4th | Ultra Foxy | February 22, 2006 |
| 5th | The Legend | June 12, 2006 |
| 6th | The Legend Final Live | December 20, 2006 |

=== Remix albums ===
| # | Album | Release date |
|---|---|---|
| 1st | Heart Attack! The Remixes & Video Clips | February 25, 2004 |
| 2nd | Heart Attack 2 The Remixes & Video Clips | June 29, 2005 |
| 3rd | Heart Attack 3 The Remixes & Video Clips | May 24, 2006 |

=== Singles ===
| # | Single | Release date |
|---|---|---|
| 1st | "So Tell Me" | December 19, 2001 |
| 2nd | "That's Why" | March 6, 2002 |
| 3rd | "Body Rock" | August 28, 2002 |
| 4th | "Should Have What!?" feat. DOUBLE | December 26, 2002 |
| 5th | "Thru With You" | April 16, 2003 |
| 6th | "Candy Pop" feat. SOUL'd OUT | September 3, 2003 |
| 7th | "I See You" | July 28, 2004 |
| 8th | "Love & Joy" | October 14, 2004 |
| 9th | "Fantasy" | December 15, 2004 |
| 10th | "Shining" | February 2, 2005 |
| 11th | "Hey DJ!" | July 27, 2005 |
| 12th | "Angel Eyes" | October 12, 2005 |
| 13th | "冬 gonna love ♥" | January 25, 2006 |
| 14th | "STAY / Foxy Lady" | May 24, 2006 |

=== Collaborations / Compilations ===
- Woman - Keizo Nakanishi featuring Heartsdales (CD Album Idenshi - 07.30.2003)
- Helpless Game - Heartsdales Featuring Verbal and Mika Nakashima (CD Album Radioactive)
- Helpless Rain (But I'm Falling Too Deep Version) - Mika Nakashima Feat. Verbal and Heartsdales (CD Single Helpless Rain)
- Switch - Lisa featuring Kumi Koda & Heartsdales (CD Single Switch/I Only Want to Be with You)
- Switch - Lisa featuring Kumi Koda & Heartsdales (CD Album Gratitude)
- Wet N' Wild - Heartsdales featuring SUITE CHIC (CD Album Sugar Shine)
- Starstruck: "The Return of the LuvBytes" - M-Flo loves AI & Hinouchi Emi & Rum (Heartsdales) (CD Album Astromantic - 05.26.2004)
- It's a Small World - Kumi Koda & Heartsdales (Soundtrack 80 Days - 11.03.2004)
- It's a Small World - Kumi Koda & Heartsdales (CD Album secret (first press) - 02.09.2005)
- Oh Boy - Jhett featuring Heartsdales (CD Album Jhett a.k.a. Yakko for Aquarius - 03.24.2005)
- Push It (Compilation We Love Dance Classics Vol. 1 - 03.24.2005)
- Speedster - Three Nation feat. Heartsdales (CD Album Dance Floor Lovers - 3.15.2006)
- Player - Origa featuring Heartsdales (Soundtrack Ghost in the Shell: Stand Alone Complex - Solid State Society OP Song 11.22.2006)
