= Melody discography =

melody. discography
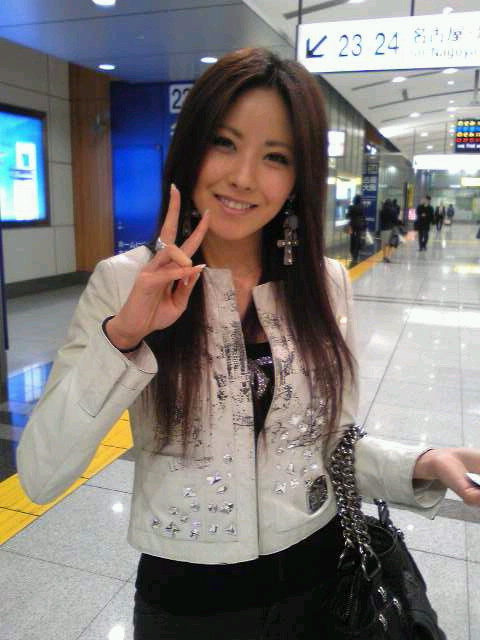
- Studio albums: 4
- Compilation albums: 1
- Singles: 13
- Music videos: 13
- B-sides: 13
- Collaborations: 3
- DVDs: 5

This is the discography of Japanese pop singer melody.

== Albums ==
=== Studio albums ===
Album #	Album information	Peak position	Sales total	Chart run
1st / Debut	Sincerely: Released: January 21, 2004; Languages: Japanese, English; Catalog#: TFCC-86145	3	87,294	14 weeks
2nd	Be as One: Released: April 12, 2006; Languages: Japanese, English; Catalog#: TFCC-86202	5	78,587	10 weeks
3rd	Ready to Go!: Released: July 4, 2007; Language: Japanese; Catalog#: TFCC-86225	6	45,184	2 weeks
4th	Lei Aloha: Released: April 9, 2008; Language: Japanese; Catalog#: TFCC-86252	15	20,609	7 weeks

=== Compilation albums ===
Album #	Album information	Peak position	Sales total	Chart run
1st	The Best of Melody: Timeline: Released: October 8, 2008; Length: 1:11:14; Language: Japanese	4	42,155	-

=== Featured albums ===
Album #	Album information	Peak position	Sales total	Chart run
1st	Astromantic: Artist: M-Flo; Released: May 26, 2004; Featured Track: #2 – Miss You; Language: Japanese	-	-	-
2nd	Cosmicolor: Artist: M-Flo; Released: March 28, 2007; Featured Track: #4 – Stuck in Your Love; Language: Japanese	-	-	-
3rd	The Popular Music: Released: July 11, 2007; Featured Track: Manatsu No Dekigoto; Language: Japanese	-	-	-
4th	Alpen Best: Another Edition: Released: December 15, 2007; Featured Tracks: Crystal Love, Next to You; Language: Japanese	-	-	-
5th	Daybreak: Artist: Tanaka Roma; Released: June 4, 2008; Featured Track: #2 – Boyfriend/Girlfriend; Language: Japanese	84	-	-
6th	Ryohei Best: Artist: Yamamoto Ryohei; Released: September 3, 2008; Featured Track: Miss You (M-Flo Loves Melody & Yamamoto Ryohei); Language: Japanese	-	-	-

== Singles ==
Single #	Single information	Peak position	Sales total	Chart run
1st / Debut	"Dreamin' Away": Released: February 19, 2003; Studio Album: Sincerely; B-sides: Now, 24 Seven; Length: 14:50; Language: Japanese; Catalog#: TFCC-89058	33	20,054	8 weeks
2nd	"Simple as That/Over the Rainbow": Released: June 18, 2003; Studio Album: Sincerely; Length: 11:04; Language: Japanese; Catalog#: TFCC-89070	29	14,608	5 weeks
3rd	"Crystal Love": Released: November 27, 2003; Studio Album: Sincerely; B-side: Do You Hear What I Hear?; Length: 13:40; Language: Japanese; Catalog#: TFCC-89082	34	16,889	11 weeks
4th	"Believe Me (Japanese Version)": Released: June 9, 2004; B-side: So into You (Japanese Version); Length: 17:11; Language: Japanese; Catalog#: TFCC-89103	16	17,539	6 weeks
4th	"Believe Me (English Version)": Released: June 9, 2004; B-side: So into You (English Version); Length: 17:15; Language: English	30	11,950	6 weeks
5th	"Next to You": Released: January 12, 2005; Studio Album: Be as One; B-side: Summer Memory; Length: 16:53; Language: Japanese; Catalog#: TFCC-89127	14	21,876	6 weeks
6th	"Realize/Take a Chance": Released: August 17, 2005; Studio Album: Be as One; Length: 22:00; Language: Japanese; Catalog#: TFCC-89145	6	127,869	16 weeks
7th	"See You...": Released: February 15, 2006; Studio Album: Be as One; B-side: Close Your Eyes; Length: 20:20; Language: Japanese; Catalog#: TFCC-89157	19	13,070	5 weeks
8th	"Lovin' U": Released: November 8, 2006; Studio Album: Ready to Go!; B-sides: Our Journey, Feel the Rush; Length: 18:14; Language: Japanese; Catalog#: TFCC-89188	16	15,434	4 weeks
9th	"Finding My Road": Released: February 14, 2007; Studio Album: Ready to Go!; B-sides: Fragile, My Dear; Language: Japanese; Catalog#: TFCC-89193	13	17,594	5 weeks
10th	"Love Story": Released: May 30, 2007; Studio Album: Ready to Go!; B-sides: BoRn 2 Luv U (Melody Loves M-Flo); Length: 17:08; Language: Japanese; Catalog#: TFCC-89206	21	10,922	4 weeks
11th	"Haruka": Released: February 13, 2008; Studio Album: Lei Aloha; B-side: That's The Way It Is; Length: 19:29; Language: Japanese; Catalog#: TFCC-89237	10	39,042	10 weeks

=== Featured singles ===
Single #	Single information	Peak position	Sales total	Chart run
1st	"Miss You": Artist: M-Flo; Released: October 22, 2003; Studio Album: Astromantic; Language: Japanese	8	70,901	-
2nd	"Boyfriend/Girlfriend": Artist: Tanaka Roma; Released: April 30, 2008; Studio Album: Daybreak; Language: Japanese	60	-	-

== DVDs ==
Single #	Single information	Peak position	Sales total	Chart run
1st	First Visual Issue: Clips and More Sincerely Yours: Released: May 12, 2004; Language: Japanese	-	-	-
2nd	Be as One Tour 2006 Live and Document: Released: November 8, 2006; Language: Japanese	-	-	-

=== Featured DVDs ===
Single #	Single information	Peak position	Sales total	Chart run
1st	Astromantic DVD: Artist: M-Flo; Released: February 23, 2005; Featured Video: Miss You PV; Language: Japanese	-	-	-
2nd	Tour 2005 Beat Space Nine at Nihon Budokan: Artist: M-Flo; Released: February 26, 2006; Featured Video: Miss You Live Performance; Language: Japanese	-	-	-
3rd	Tour 2007 Cosmicolor at Yokohama Arena: Artist: M-Flo; Released: October 31, 2007; Featured Video: Miss You Live Performance; Language: Japanese	-	-	-

== Music videos ==
- Dreamin' Away

Studio Album: Sincerely
Length: 3:14
Director: David Brooks
Released: February 19, 2003

- Simple As That

Studio Album: Sincerely
Length: 4:52
Released: June 18, 2003

- Crystal Love

Studio Album: Sincerely
Length: 5:07
Released: November 27, 2003

- Believe Me

Length: 4:44
Released: June 9, 2004

- Next to You

Studio Album: Be as One
Length: 4:34
Released: January 12, 2005

- Realize

Studio Album: Be as One
Length: 3:46
Released: August 17, 2005

- See You...

Studio Album: Be as One
Length: 4:34
Released: February 15, 2006

- Lovin' U

Studio Album: Ready to Go!
Length: 4:32
Released: November 8, 2006

- Finding My Road

Studio Album: Ready to Go!
Length: 4:28
Released: February 14, 2007

- Love Story

Studio Album: Ready to Go!
Length: 4:47
Released: May 30, 2007

- BoRn 2 luv U (Melody Loves M-Flo)

Length: 3:26
Released: May 30, 2007

- Haruka: Haruka

Studio Album: Lei Aloha
Length: 6:31
Released: February 13, 2008

- Boyfriend/Girlfriend (Tanaka Roma featuring Melody)

Studio Album: Daybreak
Length: 5:09
Released: April 30, 2008
