= 2013 World Masters Athletics Championships =

Coordinates: 30.05638°S 51.21952°W

- Dates: 16 - 27 October 2013
- Host city: Porto Alegre, Brazil
- Venue: CETE
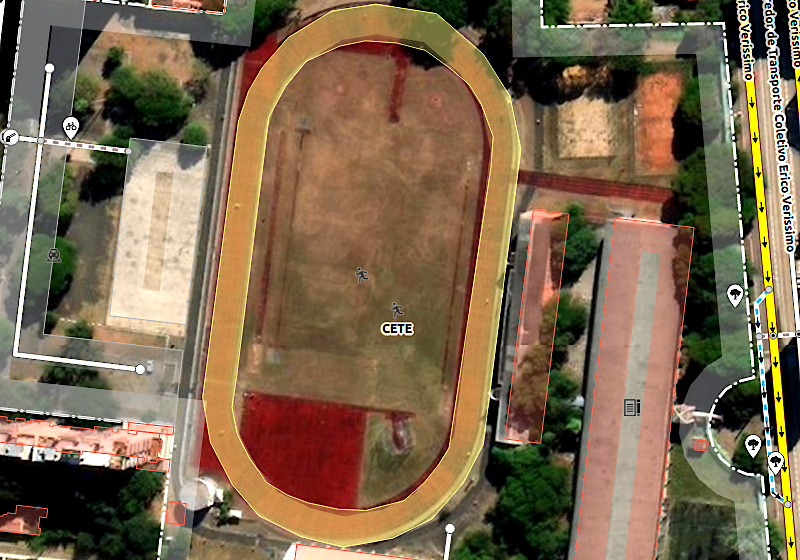
- Level: Masters
- Type: Outdoor
- Participation: 4138 athletes from 82 nations
- Official website: Archived 2013-10-27 at the Wayback Machine

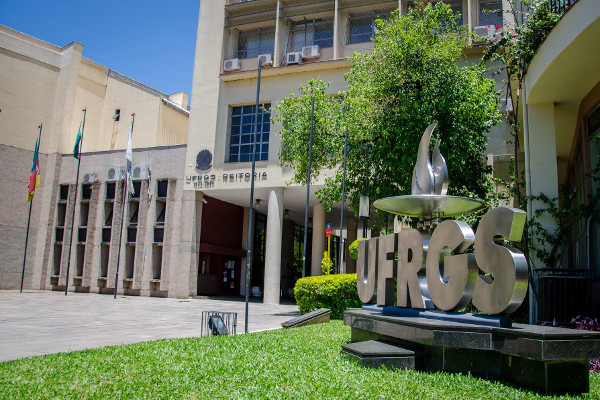
UFRGS

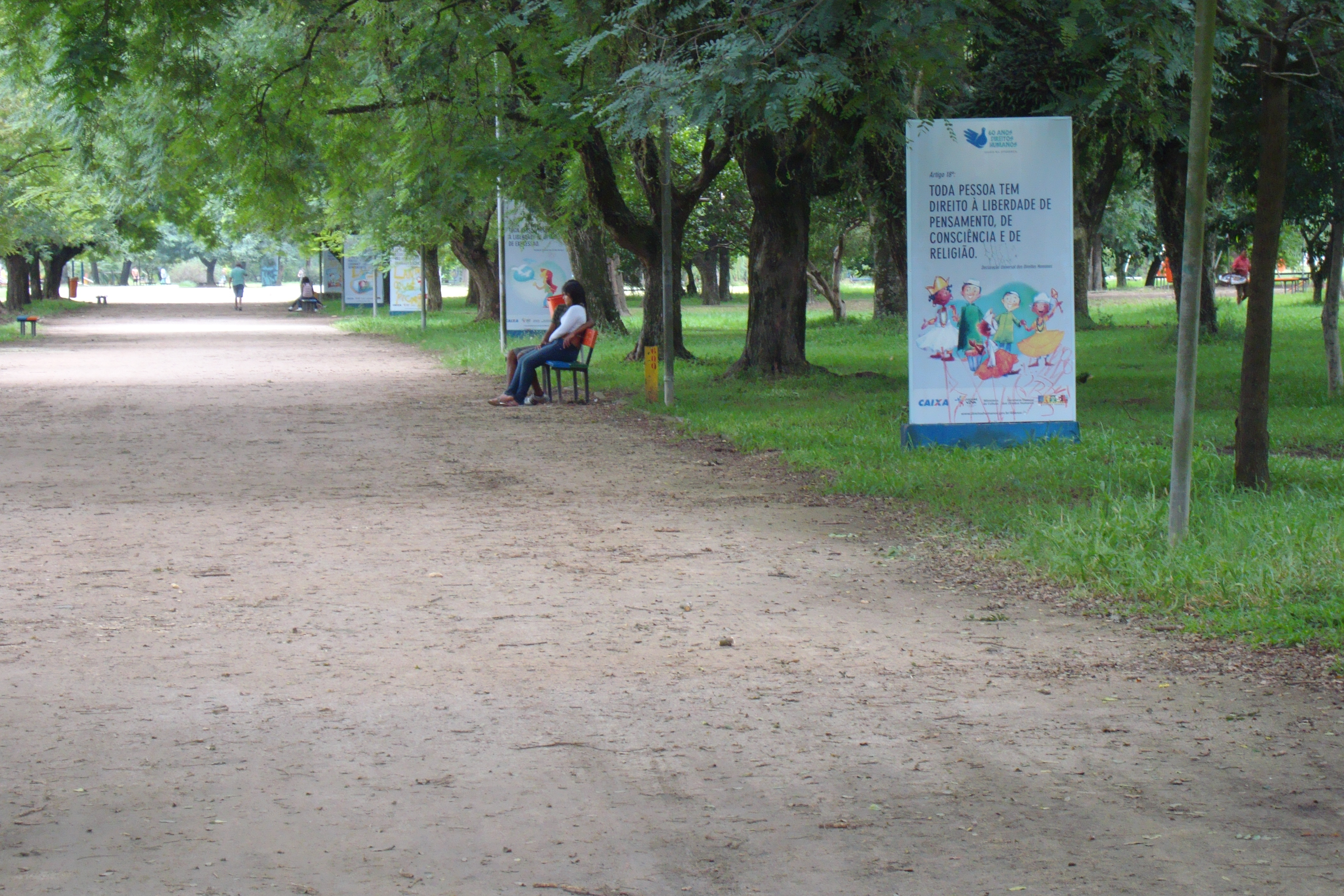
Parque Marinha do Brasil

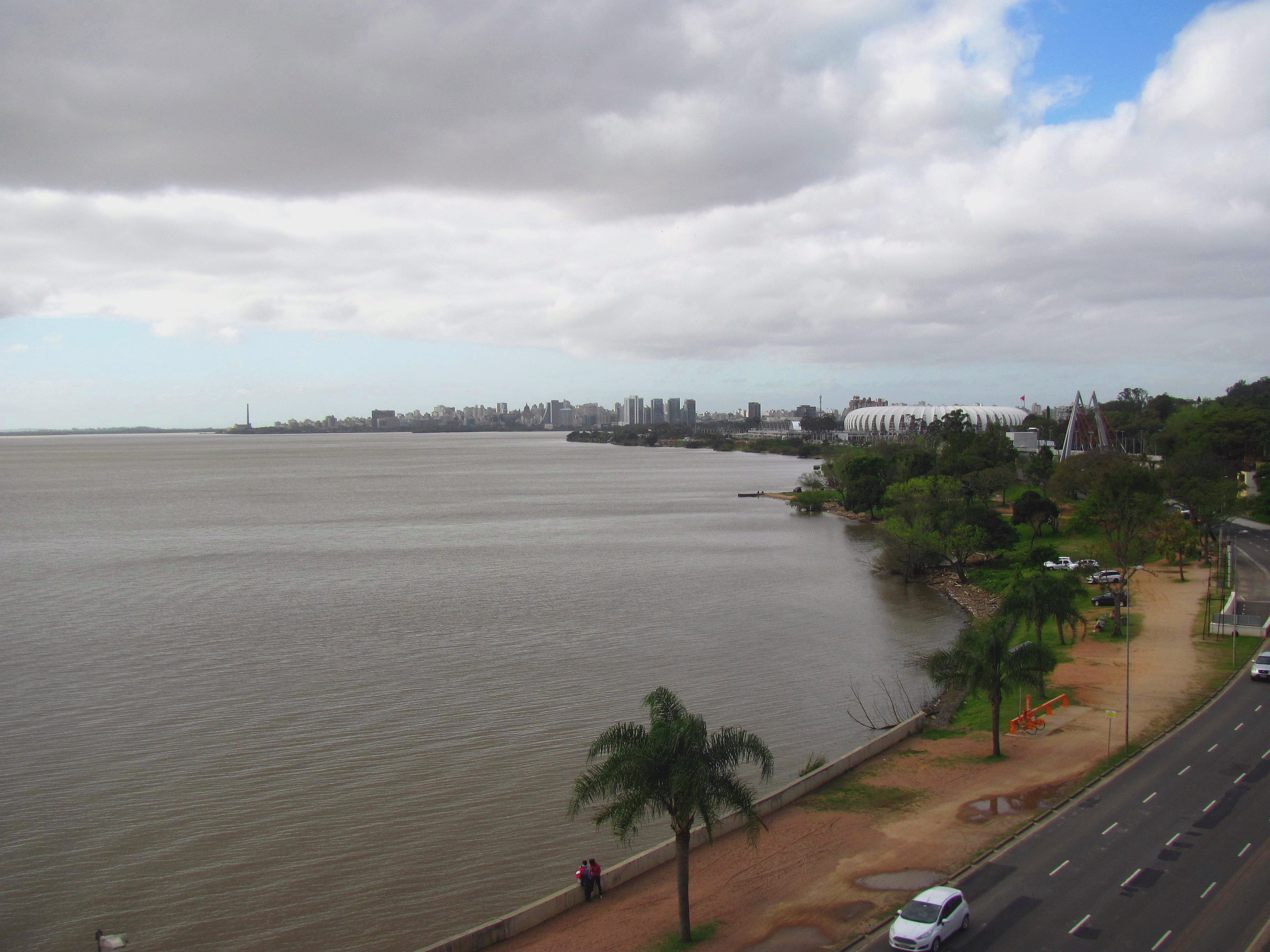
Orla do Guaíba

2013 World Masters Athletics Championships is the 20th in a series of World Masters Athletics Outdoor Championships that took place in Porto Alegre, Brazil from 16 to 27 October 2013.

The main venue was Centro Estadual de Treinamento Esportivo (CETE), which had a newly laid track. Supplemental venues included Estádio Universitário da PUCRS at Pontifical Catholic University of Rio Grande do Sul (PUCRS), Universidade Federal do Rio Grande do Sul (UFRGS), Sociedade de Ginástica Porto Alegre (SOGIPA). Non-stadia road races were held at Parque Marinha do Brasil and Orla do Guaíba.

This Championships was organized by World Masters Athletics (WMA) in coordination with a Local Organising Committee (LOC): Estate of Rio Grande Do Sul, City Hall of Porto Alegre, ABRAM (Brazilian Association of Athletics Master) - Francisco Hypolito da Silveira and Group AUSTRAL - Vinicius Garcia.

The WMA is the global governing body of the sport of athletics for athletes 35 years of age or older, setting rules for masters athletics competition.

In addition to a full range of track and field events, non-stadia events included 8K Cross Country, 10K Race Walk, 20K Race Walk, Half Marathon and Marathon.

== World Records ==
Official results are archived at wma2013. Past Championships results are archived at WMA; the 2013 results are available as a searchable pdf. Additional archives are available from British Masters Athletic Federation in several searchable pdf files and from Museum of Masters Track & Field as a searchable pdf.

Masters world records set at this Championships are listed below. New to the outdoor Championships series is the Half Marathon; therefore all age-group winners set new world records for this event.

=== Women ===
Event	Athlete(s)	Nationality	Performance
W55 100 Meters	Marie Mathieu	PUR	13.24
W60 100 Meters	Karla Del Grande	CAN	13.30
W55 200 Meters	Marie Mathieu	PUR	27.16
W60 200 Meters	Karla Del Grande	CAN	28.11
W55 400 Meters	Marie Mathieu	PUR	1:00.56
W60 400 Meters	Karla Del Grande	CAN	1:06.24
W70 400 Meters	Riet Jonkers-Slegers	NED	1:15.81
W80 10000 Meters	Denise Leclerc	FRA	55:26.46
W70 200 Meters Hurdles	Magdalena Tomlinson	RSA	39.50
W80 20K Race Walk	Denise Leclerc	FRA	2:42:27
W80 High Jump	Rosemary Chrimes	GBR	1.10
W75 Shot Put	Evaun Williams	GBR	11.10
W75 Hammer throw	Evaun Williams	GBR	39.64
W75 Weight Throw	Evaun Williams	GBR	14.74
W75 Javelin Throw	Evaun Williams	GBR	29.92
W75 Throws Pentathlon	Evaun Williams	GBR	5528
W35 Half Marathon	Rosa Jussara Barbosa	BRA	1:22:36
W40 Half Marathon	Jennifer Malavolta	USA	1:20:09
W45 Half Marathon	Maribel Del Carme Osman	ARG	1:25:49
W50 Half Marathon	Ashley Meyer	VEN	1:34:51
W55 Half Marathon	Anne Ryan	AUS	1:36:23
W60 Half Marathon	Britt S M Hellmark	SWE	1:46:56
W65 Half Marathon	Petrina Trowbridge	AUS	1:53:57
W70 Half Marathon	Marisa da Silva Cruz	BRA	1:49:19
W75 Half Marathon	Erika Kruger	GER	2:31:56

=== Men ===
Event	Athlete(s)	Nationality	Performance
M85 100 Meters	Yoshiyuki Shimizu	BRA	15.97
M95 100 Meters	Frederico Fischer	BRA	20.41
M85 200 Meters	Yoshiyuki Shimizu	BRA	33.27
M90 200 Meters	Lucas Nel	RSA	38.04
M85 400 Meters	Yoshiyuki Shimizu	BRA	1:20.46
M85 800 Meters	Francisco do Carmo Oliveira	BRA	3:17.45
M85 1500 Meters	Francisco do Carmo Oliveira	BRA	6:37.75
M65 5K Race Walk	Ian Richards	GBR	24:13.10
M65 Throws Pentathlon	Arild Busterud	NOR	5255
M35 Half Marathon	Claudir Rodrigues	BRA	1:10:19
M40 Half Marathon	Jefferson Rivas Sanchez	VEN	1:10:25
M45 Half Marathon	Cesar Troncoso Troncoso	ARG	1:10:10
M50 Half Marathon	Gianluca Grassi	ITA	1:16:02
M55 Half Marathon	Tore Axelsson	SWE	1:17:20
M60 Half Marathon	Mario Vargas Mac-Donald	CHI	1:21:28
M65 Half Marathon	Kauko Kuningas	FIN	1:25:04
M70 Half Marathon	Roberto Vasquez	ARG	1:40:55
M75 Half Marathon	Bernardino Pereira	POR	1:39:13
M80 Half Marathon	Bert Janes	AUS	2:44:42
