= Galina Kovalenskaya =

Russian Masters track and field athlete (born 1934)

Galina Kovalenskaya (born September 24, 1934) is a Russian Masters track and field athlete. She is the former W75 World Record holder in the shot put. Her record of 8.93 m (29 ft 3 1/2 in) was retired as the farthest outdoor mark with the 3 kg implement; the age division now throws a 2 kg implement. Her distance was surpassed by former Olympian Rosemary Chrimes indoors with 9.21, but World Masters Athletics do not accept indoor marks as equal to outdoor marks. At the 2010 World Indoor Masters Championships in Kamloops, British Columbia, Canada, she also set the W75 World Indoor Record in the weight throw.

== Career ==
She won the same event at the 2015 World Masters Athletics Championships, in the process setting the W80 World Throws Pentathlon Bests in the shot Put, discus and javelin throw. Separately she also won the World Championship in those same three events. leaving Lyon, France, with four gold medals plus a bronze in the weight throw. She had won a silver medal in the 5 throwing events in 2009 and a bronze in 2007. In 2009, she was a silver medalist in the hammer throw. She ran the 2000 metres steeplechase in Porto Alegre, Brazil in 2013 at age 79, to become the oldest woman to complete a steeplechase while winning a silver medal, until in 2015 Florence Meiler ran the steeplechase at age 80. She won the weight pentathlon at the 2013 and 2005 editions of the World Masters Games. She almost ran the table in the 2005 throwing events, only prevented by a second place in the discus.

At the 2010 World Indoor Masters Championships she successfully ran the table, winning all the throwing events
