= Ebihara =

Ebihara (written: 海老原 or 蛯原) is a Japanese surname. Notable people with the surname include:

- Hiroyuki Ebihara (海老原 博幸, 1940–1991), Japanese boxer
- Seiji Ebihara (海老原 清治, born 1949), Japanese golfer
- Shin Ebihara (海老原 紳, born 1948), Japanese diplomat
- Yuka Ebihara (海老原 由佳, born 1986), Japanese ballet dancer
- Yuka Ebihara (announcer) (海老原 優香, born 1994), Japanese television announcer
- Yuki Ebihara (海老原 有希, born 1985), Japanese javelin thrower
- Yuri Ebihara (蛯原 友里, born 1979), Japanese model and actress
