= J-Melo =

- Title card
- Genre: Music show
- Directed by: Harada Nobuyuki
- Presented by: Kayna & Sascha
- Country of origin: Japan
- Original languages: English; Japanese

Production
- Producer: Harada Nobuyuki
- Camera setup: Multicamera setup
- Running time: 30 minutes

Original release
- Network: NHK
- Release: 7 October 2005 – present

J-Melo is a weekly Japanese music television program broadcast by NHK. It is recorded almost entirely in the English language. It began broadcasting on October 7, 2005. The program is available on NHK's World Service television station, Radio Japan, Digital Educational TV and on its Domestic General Channel.

== History and Programming ==
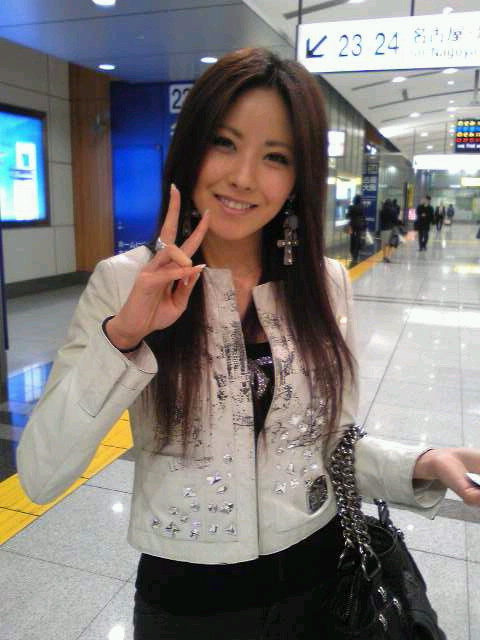
melody. hosted the program from April 2007 until September 2008.

The program started broadcasting on October 7, 2005, and was hosted by Mai Takematsu, a Japanese harpist. The name "J-Melo" comes from the words, "Japan", "Melody", and "Mellow". The show is the first Japanese music program produced by NHK to be recorded entirely in English, and presents various Japanese music and musicians to the rest of the world through its global television station, NHK World. The show is also aired in Japan in English with Japanese subtitles. In March 2007, Mai Takematsu left the show in order to pursue her medical career, and in April 2007, she was replaced by Japanese singer, melody. She hosted the show until September 2008, when it was announced that May J. would host the succeeding episodes. The new J-Melo debuted in October 2008, with May J. along with Shanti presenting the program, with an updated set and website and a new opening billboard. It was the first time that the program had two permanent presenters. Shanti, however, left the show in 2010. Aside from music videos, the program features interviews and recorded performances.

In 2009, J-Melo started a music project, a fictitious band called Rough-T with manga characters fronted by Takekawa Ai, produced by Marty Friedman, and with additional production by international independent artists kevn, Kirby and Crazy Dragon. J-Melo features comments from Dave Spector, who hosts most episodes together with May J.

In March 2026, May J. announced that she has hosted her last J-Melo episode.

Starting in April 2026, Kayna & Sascha were announced as the new co-hosts.

== Segments ==
J-Melo has a weekly theme, where most of the video content of the show revolve around. These include topics such as "Summer Favorites", "Musicians from Okinawa" or "Summer Rock Festivals". Every other month, the show also has a request special, where viewers send requests through the J-Melo website. (In a June 2007 request special, it was revealed that the most requested Japanese musical act is L'Arc-en-Ciel.) In 2007, the show introduced the segment, "Japan Dance Music Adventure," a monthly dance special, where the host tours Japan in search of traditional and modern dance music.

Currently, J-Melo features normally two acts, either a Japanese singer, band or idol group, and they perform one or two of their songs in studio. The show will also feature the guest's latest music video, but limited showing for broadcast time.

== Specials ==
Every year since 2005, the show has an annual special, counting down the top singles of the year. Since 2007, however, J-Melo aired among others, aired a summer special, several "live to the world" specials (filmed in front of a live audience, not aired live), an Okinawa special and a Tokushima special. Occasionally, the show will also broadcast guest highlights every quarter.

=== E-mail Special ===
In December 2007, the program started to air an E-mail special. It counted down the countries where the show received the most e-mail from, as well as the year's top requested artists.

==== 2007 ====
E-Mail Countdown (by country)

Rank	Country
1	Philippines
2	Peru
3	United States
4	Canada
5	Brazil; Mexico; Indonesia
6	Nepal
7	Japan
8	Malaysia
9	Vietnam
10	Portugal

Most Requested Artists

Rank	Artist
1	L'Arc-en-Ciel
2	melody.
3	KAT-TUN
4	Hikaru Utada
5	NEWS
6	Morning Musume
7	DIR EN GREY
8	YUI
9	Ai Otsuka
10	Namie Amuro

==== 2008 ====
E-Mail Countdown (by country)

Rank	Country
1	Philippines
▲2	United States
▼3	Peru
▲4	Japan
5	Indonesia
▼6	Brazil
▼7	Canada
8	Vietnam; Nepal (▼)
9	Thailand (New)
10	United Arab Emirates (New)

Most Requested Artists

Rank	Artist
1	L'Arc-en-Ciel
2	Arashi
3	Hey! Say! JUMP
4	melody.
5	KAT-TUN
6	NEWS
7	Tohoshinki
8	Hikaru Utada
9	Alice Nine
10	YUI

==== 2009 ====
E-Mail Countdown (by country)

Rank	Country
1	Philippines
2	United Kingdom (New)
▼3	United States
▲4	Indonesia
▼5	Peru
6	Brazil
7	Saudi Arabia (New)
8	United Arab Emirates (▲); Vietnam
▼9	Nepal
10	Australia (New); Ireland (New)

Most Requested Artists

Rank	Artist
1	L'Arc-en-Ciel
2	Tohoshinki
3	Arashi
4	NEWS
5	Hey! Say! JUMP
6	KAT-TUN
7	May J.
8	The Gazette
9	GACKT
10	Ayumi Hamasaki

==== 2010 ====
E-Mail Countdown (by country)

Rank	Country
▲1	United Kingdom
▼2	Philippines
▲3	Indonesia
▼4	United States
5	Germany (New)
6	Chile (New)
▼7	Brazil
▼8	Peru
▼9	Saudi Arabia
▲10	Mexico

Most Requested Artists

Rank	Artist
1	The Gazette
2	Hey! Say! JUMP
3	L'Arc-en-Ciel
4	Arashi
5	May J.
6	KAT-TUN
7	NEWS
8	YUI
9	SCANDAL
10	GACKT

==== 2011 ====
E-Mail Countdown (by country)

Rank	Country
▲1	Indonesia
▲2	United States
▼3	United Kingdom
▼4	Philippines
▲5	Peru
6	France (New)
▲7	Mexico
▼8	Chile
9	Saudi Arabia
▼10	Brazil

Most Requested Artists

Rank	Artist
1	L'Arc-en-Ciel
2	The Gazette
3	Morning Musume
4	SCANDAL
5	YUI
6	Hey! Say! JUMP
7	Alice Nine
8	Arashi
9	May J.
10	AKB48

==== 2012 ====
E-Mail Countdown (by country)

Rank	Country
1	Indonesia
2	United States
▲3	Philippines
▼4	United Kingdom
▲5	Brazil
▼6	Peru
▲7	Saudi Arabia
▼8	Mexico
▼9	France
▲10	Germany

Most Requested Artists

Rank	Artist
1	The Gazette
2	Arashi
3	L'Arc-en-Ciel
4	Morning Musume
5	Alice Nine
6	AKB48
7	KAT-TUN
8	Hey! Say! JUMP
9	SCANDAL
10	GACKT

==== 2013 ====
E-Mail Countdown (by country)

Rank	Country
▲1	United States
▲2	Philippines
▼3	Indonesia
4	United Kingdom
▲5	Peru
▲6	France
▼7	Brazil
8	Mexico
9	Singapore (New)
10	Germany

Most Requested Artists

Rank	Artist
1	The Gazette
2	Arashi
3	Alice Nine
4	Morning Musume '14
5	Hey! Say! JUMP
6	L'Arc-en-Ciel
7	SCANDAL
8	AKB48
9	ONE OK ROCK
10	KAT-TUN

==== 2014 ====
E-Mail Countdown (by country)

Rank	Country
▲1	Indonesia
▼2	United States
▼3	Philippines
4	United Kingdom
▲5	Brazil
▲6	Mexico
▼7	France
▲8	Malaysia
▲9	Australia
10	Germany

Most Requested Artists

Rank	Artist
1	SCANDAL
2	The Gazette
3	Morning Musume '14
4	Alice Nine
5	Arashi
6	Hey! Say! JUMP
7	ONE OK ROCK
8	AKB48
9	L'Arc-en-Ciel
10	Diaura

==== 2015 ====
E-Mail Countdown (by country)

Rank	Country
▲1	United States
▼2	Indonesia
▲3	United Kingdom
▲4	Mexico
▼5	Philippines
▲6	France
7	China (New)
▼8	Brazil
▲9	Singapore
10	Germany

Most Requested Artists

Rank	Artist
1	The Gazette
2	Scandal
3	Morning Musume '15
4	Arashi
5	L'Arc-en-Ciel
6	One Ok Rock
7	KAT-TUN
8	Vamps
9	AKB48
10	Babymetal

==== 2016 ====
E-Mail Countdown (by country)

Rank	Country
1	United States
2	Indonesia
3	United Kingdom
▲4	Philippines
▼5	Mexico
▲6	China
▲7	Singapore
8	Brazil
▲9	Chile
▼10	France

Most Requested Artists

Rank	Artist
1	The Gazette
2	Scandal
3	Morning Musume '16
4	Arashi
5	L'Arc-en-Ciel
6	Babymetal
7	AKB48
8	One Ok Rock
9	Band-Maid
10	Silent Siren

==== 2017 ====
E-Mail Countdown (by country)

Rank	Country
1	United States
▲2	United Kingdom
▼3	Indonesia
4	Philippines
▲5	Brazil
6	Algeria (New)
7	India (New)
▲8	France
9	Turkey (New)
▲10	Peru

Most Requested Artists

Rank	Artist
1	Babymetal
2	Morning Musume '17
3	Scandal
4	The Gazette
5	Arashi
6	One Ok Rock
7	L'Arc-en'Ciel
8	Hey! Say! JUMP
9	AKB48
10	Silent Siren

==== 2018 ====
Most Requested Artists

Rank	Artist
1	The Gazette
2	Scandal
3	Morning Musume '18
4	May J.
5	Arashi
6	L'Arc-en'Ciel
7	One Ok Rock
8	Hey! Say! JUMP
9	AKB48
10	Diaura

== Guests ==
Aside from a weekly theme, J-Melo also has a guest at least once a month. Most of the time, guest greetings are recorded on video to thank their supporters from outside Japan. There are also some episodes where the guests will sit down on set for an interview and sometimes, a performance. The theme for these shows will usually be the works of the guest musician. These appearances are rather significant, as the show is primarily recorded for foreign viewers. Interviews and messages are also subtitled in English whenever needed.

=== Notable Guests ===
The following are notable guests who appeared in the show. Those with dates in light blue are guests who appeared on set, while those in light yellow are guests who appeared on video.

==== 2006 ====
Title	Date
Bonnie Pink	July 2006
Demon Kogure	August 2006
melody.	November 2006

==== 2007 ====
Title	Date
Dir En Grey	March 2007
HIGH and MIGHTY COLOR	March 2007
Angela Aki	April 2007
Sowelu	April 2007
M-Flo	April 2007
Akikawa Masafumi	June 2007; December 2007
L'Arc-en-Ciel	June 2007; December 2007
Crystal Kay	July 2007
Nora (Orquesta de la Luz)	August 2007
Morning Musume	August 2007
Monkey Majik	August 2007
Terumasa Hino	August 2007
Kazumi Watanabe	August 2007
Emyli	August 2007
Jyongri	August 2007
Akira Jimbo	September 2007
Soichi Muraji	September 2007
Kousuke Atari	October 2007
Jesse (RIZE)	September 2007
Makoto Ozone	November 2007
WISE	November 2007
May J.	November 2007

==== 2008 ====
Title	Date
Shonen Knife	January 2008
indigo blue	January 2008
Polysics	February 2008
Zeebra	February 2008
Tanaka Roma	March 2008
M-Flo	March 2008; April 2008
Tokyo Ska Paradise Orchestra	April 2008
Hiromi Uehara	April 2008
Miyavi	May 2008
Yasuji Ohagi	May 2008
The Gazette	May 2008
GO! GO! 7188	May 2008
Tanaka Roma	May 2008
JYONGRI	May 2008
Spontania	May 2008
Leo Imai	May 2008
SoulJa	May 2008
Tiana Xiao	May 2008
jammin’Zeb	May 2008
Yosuke Yamashita	June 2008
INFINITY16	June 2008
MONKEY MAJIK	June 2008
Leah Dizon	June 2008
Maki Ohguro	July 2008
Crystal Kay	July 2008
Perfume	July 2008
Hiromi Go	July 2008
RANKIN TAXI	August 2008
Ryohei	August 2008
JUJU	August 2008
