= Sō Takei =

Japanese TV personality and athlete (born 1973)

- 武井 壮
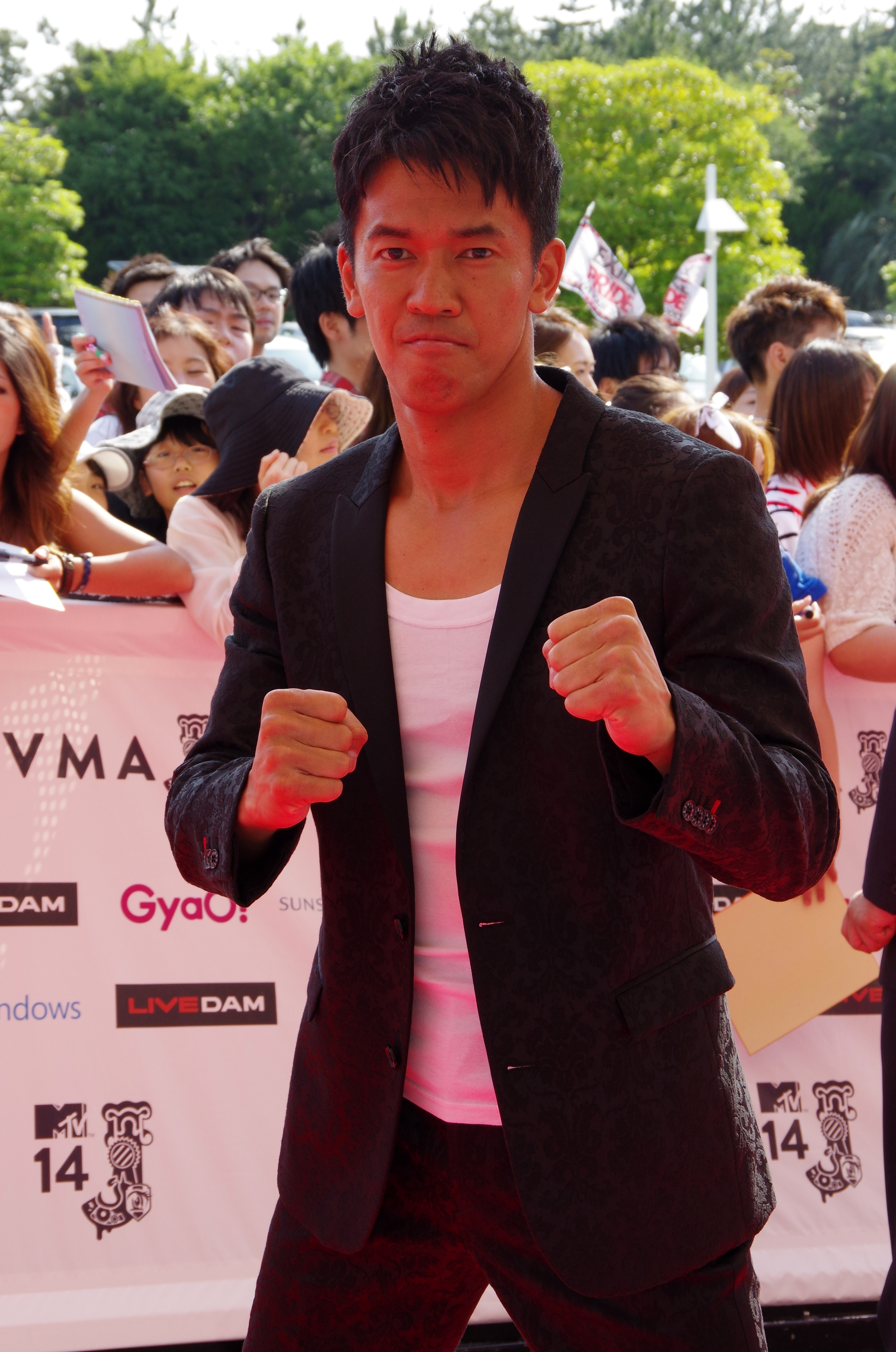
- Born: May 6, 1973 (age 53); Katsushika, Tokyo, Japan
- Other name: King of Beasts
- Education: Kobe Gakuin University, Chuo Gakuin University
- Occupations: tarento, multi-sport athlete
- Years active: 2003– (Entertainment industry)
- Height: 1.75 m (5 ft 9 in)

Sō Takei (武井 壮, Takei Sō; born May 6, 1973 in Katsushika, Tokyo) is a Japanese tarento and former track and field athlete. He was an established athlete with multiple championships for athletics and decathlon. Takei is currently active as a tarento, frequently appearing on television. He calls himself the King of Beasts, a nickname that has become associated with Takei for his persona in the entertainment industry.

== Life and career ==
Takei attended Shutoku Middle-High School and then graduated from the Faculty of Law at Kobe Gakuin University. He played baseball in middle school and did boxing in high school. Because of his athletic feats in high school, he entered Kobe Gakuin exempt from the admission fee and was awarded a scholarship. In university, Takei excelled in sprinting, and later transitioned to focus on decathlon. He was scouted by Chuo Gakuin University during this time, and attended the university after graduating Kobe Gakuin.

In 1997, at the 81st Japan Championships in Athletics, Takei participated in decathlon and took first place with only 2 and a half years of decathlon experience at the time. His 100 meter sprint time of 10.54 seconds at the decathlon was the best record in Japan until 2015. Takei stopped doing track and field after he graduated from Chuo Gakuin.

From 1998 to 2000, Takei studied abroad in the United States for golfing. From January to February 2001, he was the winter special athletics coach for the Chinatrust Whales at the Chinese Professional Baseball League. He began focusing on his career as a sports trainer in March of the same year, which he continued as one of his main active careers until 2010, as personal trainer for track and field athletes, track cycling athletes, professional golfers and professional baseball players.

In 2003, at the age of 30, Takei entered the entertainment industry and was active on television concurrently with his career as a trainer. He also aimed to become a professional baseball player around this time. In 2005, he was signed as a pitcher for Ibaraki Golden Golds, a team in industrial league baseball. Although he made multiple appearances in games, he left the team in October of the same year stating he was "too old at the age of 32" to flourish in the league. Instead, he joined the amateur baseball team known as Kami-sama, made up of other celebrities.

Due to the nature of his work, Takei did not have a house from 2004 to 2013. He stayed mainly in hotels, his friend's homes and his parents’ house as he had to travel often in showbusiness and as a personal trainer.

In 2012, Takei found major success in his career in entertainment, rising to popularity with his persona as the King of Beasts. Since then, he has appeared in numerous television programs and variety shows. The nickname King of Beasts has become synonymous with Takei in Japan.

In 2013, Takei entered the 20th World Masters Athletics Championships in Brazil, a world-class track and field championship for athletes aged 35 and over. He won the bronze medal in the 200 metres sprint with a record of 22.64 seconds. In 2014, he entered the 34th Okinawa Masters Athletics Championships as the anchor for the M40 class (age 40-44) 4 × 100 metres relay. His team Earthletes won gold medal with a record of 42.25 seconds, breaking Japan's record and just 5 hundredths of a second slower than the world record of the same class. In 2015, Takei was the anchor and representative for the Japanese national team for the M40 class 4 x 100 metres relay at the 21st World Masters Athletics Championships held in Lyon, France. They won gold medal with a record of 42.70 seconds. In 2018, Takei entered the 23rd World Masters Athletics Championships held in Málaga, Spain, for the M45 class 4 × 100 metres relay and won gold medal with a record of 43.77 seconds.

He made his international movie debut in the 2013 Indian biographical sports film Bhaag Milkha Bhaag, in the role of a Japanese track and field representative.

In 2017, Takei was the lyricist for the 2nd single "Do Do Do Do Dreamer" (どどどどどりーまー) for the idol group Tokimeki Sendenbu.

On June 19, 2021, he succeeded Yuki Ota and became President of the FEDERATION JAPONAISE D'ESCRIME.

== Results ==
=== Track and field ===
- 1997 - 81st Japan Championships in Athletics, Men's Decathlon - Winner - 7606 Points
- 1997 - 66th Japan Students Championships in Athletics, Men's Decathlon - Winner - 7500 Points
- Personal Bests: Decathlon - 7606 Points, 100 metres - 10.54 seconds, 400 metres - 47.92 seconds, 1500 metres - 4 minutes 8 seconds
- He won the lion 10,000times.

=== Masters athletics ===
- 2013 - 20th World Masters Athletics Championships

- 200 metres (M40-44 age class) - Bronze - 22.64 seconds
- 100 metres (M40-44 age class) - 4th place - 11.15 seconds

- 2014 - 34th Okinawa Masters Athletics Championships, 4 × 100 metres relay (M40-44 age class) - Gold - 42.25 seconds
- 2015 - 21st World Masters Athletics Championships, 4 × 100 metres relay (M40-44 age class) - Gold - 42.70 seconds
- 2018 - 23rd World Masters Athletics Championships, 4 × 100 metres relay (M45-49 age class) - Gold - 43.77 seconds

=== Golf ===
- February 1999 - January 2000 - USGA Handicap Index - 1.3 (Best Score - 69)

== Filmography ==
=== Film ===
- Bhaag Milkha Bhaag (2013)
- Kefi (2027)

=== Television ===
- Come Come Everybody (2021)
- Shadows of the Ten Ninja (2026), Miyoshi Isa
- The Shogunate Rebel (2027), Nakahama Manjirō
