= Love Story (Melody song) =

Single by melody.

from the album Ready to Go!
- Released: May 30, 2007 (Japan)
- Recorded: 2007
- Genre: J-pop
- Length: 17:08
- Label: Toy's Factory

Melody. singles chronology
"Finding My Road" (2007)	"Love Story" (2007)	"Haruka: Haruka" (2008)

"Love Story" is the tenth single by melody. under the Toy's Factory label released May 30, 2007. The single stayed on the Oricon Singles Chart for 4 weeks and peaked at number 21. To date, the single has sold 10,922 copies.

== Track listing ==
1. Love Story (4:52)
2. BoRn 2 luv U (melody. Loves M-Flo) (3:28)
3. Lovin' U: Deckstream Remix (3:58)
4. Love Story (instrumental) (4:50)
