= Ready to Go! =

Studio album by melody.
- Released: July 4, 2007 (Japan)
- Genre: J-Pop
- Length: 61:27
- Label: Toy's Factory

Melody. chronology
Be as One (2006)	Ready to Go! (2007)	Lei Aloha (2008)

Alternative covers
- CD+DVD Cover

Singles from Ready to Go!
- 1. "Lovin' U" Released: November 8, 2006; 2. "Finding My Road" Released: February 14, 2007; 3. "Love Story" Released: May 30, 2007

Ready to Go! is the third album released by Melody. It is her second album (and third release) to be released in a CD Only version as well as a CD+DVD version (limited edition). All of the A-sides from her singles leading up to the album are included in the track list, but none of the B-sides are, making for a total of ten brand-new songs. "Glory of Love" is a cover of Peter Cetera's hit song of the same name. The title track was also used as a Subaru Forester CM song. The album peaked at number 6 on Oricon Albums Chart. The album's release was accompanied by both standard and limited-edition formats, with the later including a DVD.

== Track listing ==
=== CD ===
1. Finding My Road (4:32)
2. With You (4:42)
3. Love Story (4:50)
4. All for Love (4:16)
5. Hope (3:47)
6. Glory of Love (4:09)
7. Ready to Go! (4:46)
8. One Day (4:14)
9. Lovin' U (4:32)
10. Real Me (4:00)
11. All I Do (4:26)
12. Shine (4:03)
13. Dangerous (3:30)

=== DVD (Limited Edition only) ===
- Music Video
1. Lovin' U
2. Finding My Road
3. Love Story
- Live Video
1. Believe Me
2. Gift of Love
