= Crystal Love =

Single by melody.

from the album Sincerely
- B-side: "Do You Hear What I Hear?"
- Released: November 27, 2003 (Japan)
- Genre: J-Pop
- Length: 22:26
- Label: Toy's Factory

Melody. singles chronology
"Miss You" (2003)	"Crystal Love" (2003)	"Believe Me" (2004)

"Crystal Love" is the third single by melody. under the Toy's Factory label released November 27, 2003. The single stayed on the Oricon Singles Chart for 12 weeks and peaked at number 34. To date, the single has sold 16,889 copies.

== Track listing ==
1. Crystal Love (5:27)
2. Do You Hear What I Hear? (3:19)
3. Crystal Love: m&M Remix (4:54)
4. Crystal Love: Instrumental (5:27)
5. Do You Hear What I Hear? Instrumental (3:19)
