= See You... =

Single by melody.

from the album Be as One
- B-side: "Close Your Eyes"
- Released: February 15, 2006 (Japan)
- Recorded: 2005
- Genre: J-Pop
- Length: 20:20
- Label: Toy's Factory

Melody. singles chronology
"Realize/Take a Chance" (2005)	"See You..." (2006)	"Lovin' U" (2006)

"See You..." is the seventh single by melody. under the Toy's Factory label released February 15, 2006. It was produced by Taku Takahashi of M-Flo. The single stayed on the Oricon Singles Chart for 5 weeks and peaked at number 19. To date, the single has sold 13,070 copies.

== Track listing ==
1. See You... (4:26)
2. Close You Eyes (5:08)
3. See You... (Mel Funk Remix) (4:12)
4. Realize (Sugiurumn House Mission Mix) (6:34)
