= Dave Spector =

American TV personality and producer in Japan

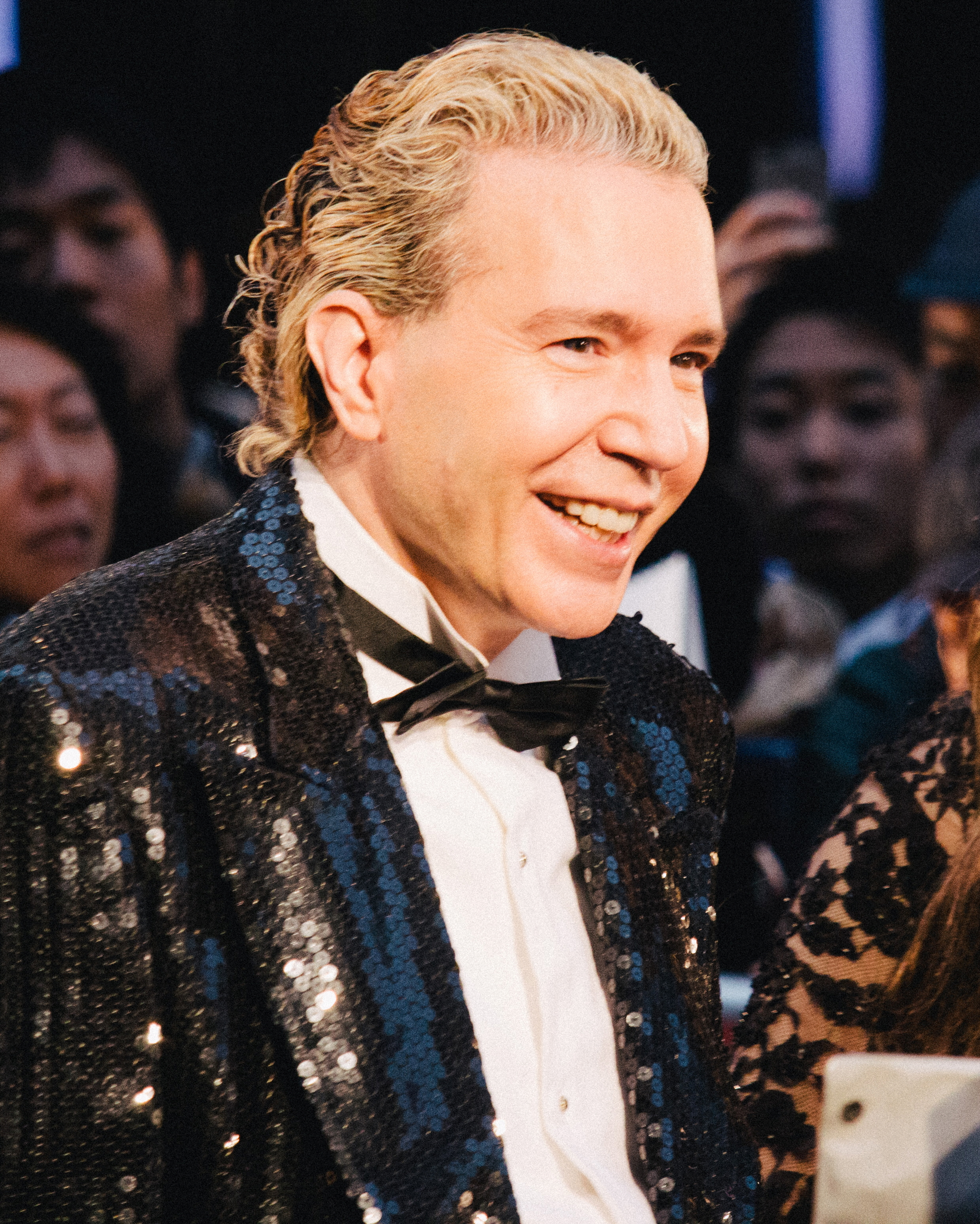
- Spector at the 27th Tokyo International Film Festival in October 2014
- Born: Chicago, Illinois, U.S.
- Education: Sophia University
- Occupations: Commentator, producer, author, actor, spokesperson
- Organization: Spector Communications
- Spouse: Kyoko Spector (m. 1981)
- Website: www.spector.co.jp

Dave Spector (Japanese: デーブ・スペクター, Hepburn: Dēbu Supekutā) is an American gaijin tarento, television producer, author, and actor based in Japan. Originally from Chicago, he moved to Japan in 1983 after visiting as a producer with the American television program Ripley's Believe It or Not!. He appears regularly as a commentator on several different Japanese television programs, including a Wednesday spot on Fuji TV's daily morning news program Tokudane!, and TBS's weekly Sunday Japon.

== Early life and education ==
As a child, Dave Spector appeared in American TV commercials, including one for the cereal manufacturer Kellogg Company. He says that he first became interested in all things Japanese in the fifth grade at elementary school when he made friends with an immigrant classmate from Japan, Michael Sugano. As a gesture of friendship, he tried to speak Japanese to him by saying "Where is the post office?" in Japanese. His friend was impressed and moved by that gesture and particularly praised Dave's Japanese pronunciation. He soon became interested in Japanese manga which his friend owned. As he desired to understand Japanese manga, he began taking Japanese lessons once a week at the Japanese school his friend attended every Sunday. He stated in his autobiography that he learned 50 new Japanese words every day, eventually becoming capable of comprehending serialized Japanese manga such as Obake no Q-tarō and Ashita no Joe. He later joined Japanese weekend classes with other Japanese children, eventually becoming the class president of the graduating class. He astonished the Japanese-American community by winning the Chicago Japanese speech contest hosted by the Chicago Japanese community, the first person of non-Japanese descent to do so. The title of his speech was "The Life and Suicide of Yukio Mishima". Spector studied at Sophia University in Tokyo, before returning to America a year later. After returning to Chicago, he enrolled at the Institute of Broadcast Arts.

== Career ==
Spector moved to Japan in 1983 to research exotic film clips from Japanese television to be used on the American TV show Ripley's Believe It or Not!. While this work continued until Ripley's Believe It or Not! ended in 1986, Spector became well known in Japan after becoming a regular guest on Fuji TV's lunchtime TV variety show Waratte Iitomo! in 1984, alongside other foreign personalities such as Canadian Kent Derricott, American Kent Gilbert, and Guinean Ousmane Sankhon. He described his work at the time as "[d]oing things like the lowest Bozo, circus kind of stuff. But it doesn't bother me at all. A lot of times the foreigners on TV, models and what-not, are compared to pandas. They use that term here—pandas—because they're cuddly, you can go and have fun with them, and throw a marshmallow and that's about it. And you don't get involved any more deeper than that. But ... since I'm making half a million dollars a year, I'm very happy to be a panda." Due to his fluency in Japanese, he also developed career as a serious commentator on Anglo-American culture and events. He became a regular commentator on foreign news and established the Tokyo-based Spector Communications in 1988, which he used to obtain clippings or video grabs from foreign media to use for his commentary role. He is ranked as one of the most, and in some years the most, well-regarded commentator in Japan for all age groups according to Oricon survey. In reference to his success in Japan, he stated that "I set a goal early on to be different from other gaijin tarento [foreign TV personalities] by trying to compete with Japanese rather than with other foreigners." Spector also has worked as a contributor to National Lampoon.

== Personal life ==
Spector is married to Kyoko Spector (京子スペクター, Kyōko Supekutā), a native of Chiba Prefecture, whom he met in the U.S.

== Filmography ==
- Nihon Igai Zenbu Chinbotsu (2006)
- Handsome Suit (2008)
- One Missed Call (2008)

== Television work ==
- Waratte Iitomo! (Fuji TV, 1984 – ?)
- Tokudane! (Fuji TV, 1999 – present)
- Wide! Scramble (ワイド!スクランブル) (NTV, July 2001 – present)
- Sunday Japon (サンデージャポン) (TBS, October 2002 – present)
- Jōhō Live Miyaneya (情報ライブ ミヤネ屋) (NTV, April 2008 – present)
- J-Melo (NHK World)

== Publications ==
- Kore wa Jōku no Gohon desu (これはジョークのご本です; This Is a Joke Book) (Shueisha, June 1986, ISBN 978-4086108546)
- Nihonjin wa Eigo ga Tokui - Hanasenai to Omoikondeiru Anata e (日本人は英語が得意―話せないと思い込んでいるあなたへ) (Goma Shobo, September 1986, ISBN 978-4341013967)
- Dēbu Supekutā no Amerika Daigimon (デーブ・スペクターのアメリカ大ギモン) (Heibonsha, November 1986, ISBN 978-4582610116)
- Bunmeitaika no Oto ga suru (文明退化の音がする) (Shinchosha, April 1987, ISBN 978-4103656012)
- Eigo de Gaijin o Warawaseru Hō (英語で外人を笑わせる法; How to Make Foreigners Laugh in English) (Shinchosha, December 1988, ISBN 978-4108015012)
- Amerikan Sunakku Geitaikai (全米スナック芸大会―道具・練習いらずで、大ウケ・大モテ) (Goma Shobo, December 1988, ISBN 978-4341030728)
- Dēbu Supekutā no Tōkyō Saiban (デーブ・スペクターの東京裁判; Dave Spector's Tokyo Trials) (Nesco, October 1989, ISBN 978-4890367771)
- Eigo wa "Nagashima-ryū" de Ike (英語は"ナガシマ流"でいけ; Nagashima-style English Is Fine) (Goma Shobo, November 1997, ISBN 978-4341018054)
- Boku wa kō shite Nihongo o oboeta (僕はこうして日本語を覚えた; This Is How I Learned Japanese) (Dobunshoin, September 1998, ISBN 978-4810375404)
- Itsumo Kokoro ni Kūru Gyaggu o (いつも心にクールギャグを) (Gentosha, June 2011, ISBN 978-4344020047)

His wife, Kyoko, wrote the following book about him:

- How to Make Dave Spector (デーブ・スペクターの作り方, Dēbu Supekutā no Tsukurikata) (Tokyo Shoseki, July 2013, ISBN 978-4487807222)
