= Kazuhide Uekusa =

Japanese economist (born 1960)

- 植草 一秀
- Born: December 18, 1960 (age 65); Edogawa, Tokyo

Academic background
- Education: University of Tokyo
- Influences: John Maynard Keynes, Milton Friedman

Academic work
- Discipline: Monetarism, Japanese economic theory, financial theory, theory of economic policy
- Awards: 23rd Tanzan Ishibashi award (2002)

Kazuhide Uekusa (植草 一秀, Uekusa Kazuhide; born December 18, 1960) is a Japanese economist, economic analyst, former senior economist at Nomura Research Institute, and chairman of the Three-Nations Research Institute. He was arrested for sexual offenses in 2004 and 2006.

== Life and career ==
He entered the University of Tokyo in 1979 and majored in economics. Uekusa joined Nomura Research Institute in April 1983 after graduating from the University of Tokyo in March 1983. He became a researcher at the Fiscal and Monetary Policy Institute of the Ministry of Finance in July 1985, an assistant professor at the Economic Research Institute of Kyoto University in June 1991, an honorary fellow at the Hoover Institution of Stanford University in October 1993, a senior economist at Nomura Research Institute in April 2002, and a professor at the Graduate School of Waseda University from April 2003 until his retirement in April 2004. He then founded the Three-Nations Research Institute and became its president on April 1, 2005. In April 2006, he made a career comeback in an academic position as a visiting professor at the Graduate School of Nagoya University of Commerce & Business in Nagoya. He lectured on "national economic strategy" until his arrest in September of that year.

He appeared as a commentator on television programs such as Fuji TV's morning show Tokudane!.

=== Criminal charges ===
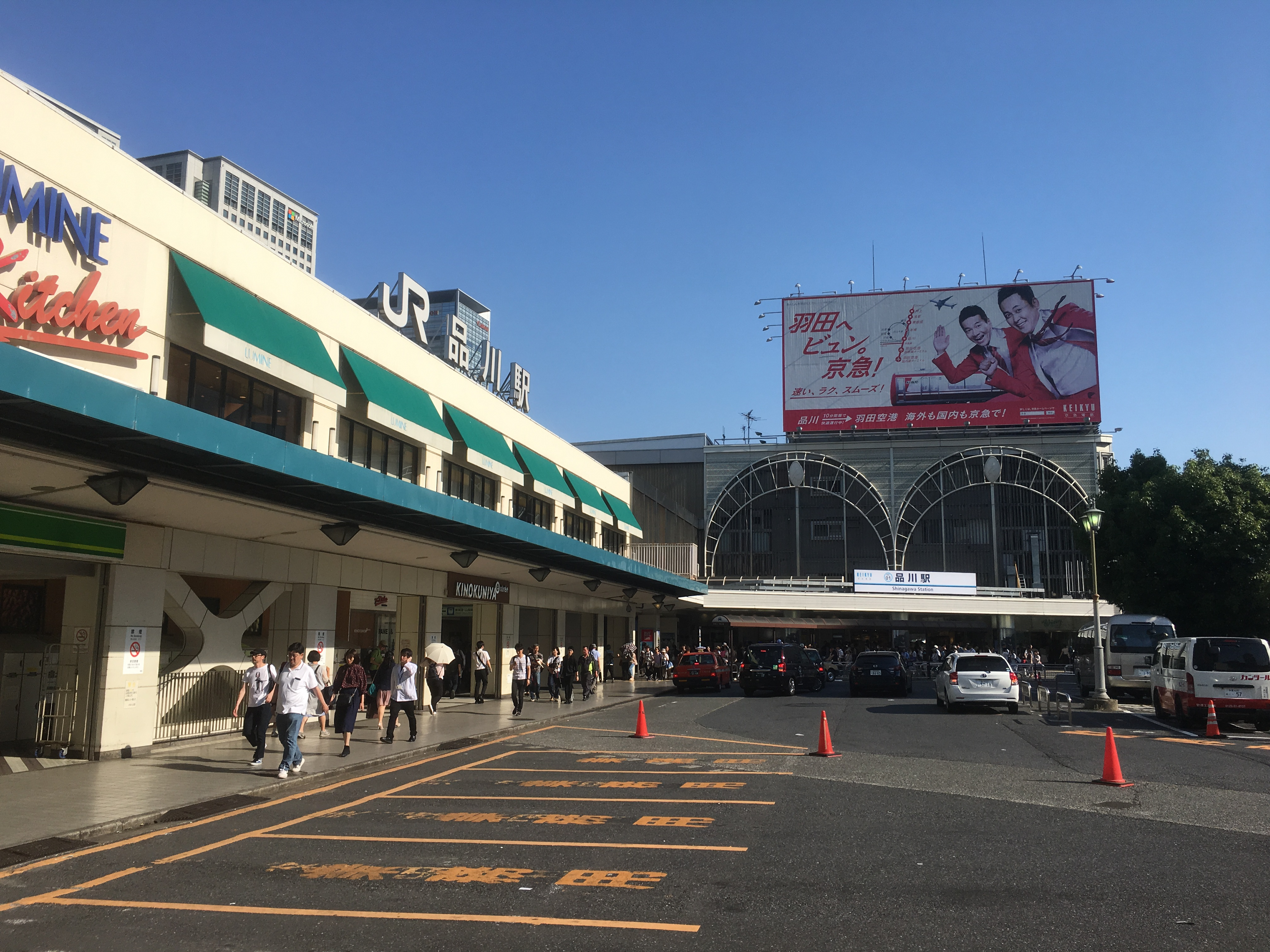
Shinagawa Station, where Uekusa was arrested for looking up a high school girl's skirt with his hand mirror on the escalator.

On April 8, 2004, Uekusa was arrested for trying to look up a high school girl's skirt with his hand mirror on an escalator at Shinagawa Station of the East Japan Railway Company in Minato, Tokyo. Immediately after his arrest, Uekusa admitted his guilt and apologized. He was dismissed from his position as a professor on May 7, 2004 over the arrest, although he denied the charges.

His trial began at the Tokyo District Court on March 23, 2005, and the presiding judge fined him 500,000 yen and confiscated his hand mirror. He insisted that it was an "unfair verdict" and intended to appeal. However, the verdict became final when he failed to file an appeal by the deadline of April 6, 2005.

Uekusa was arrested again at Keikyū Kamata Station on September 13, 2006, at around 10:10 p.m. for molesting a girl on a Keikyu train. On September 27, 2006, Nagoya University of Commerce & Business announced that it had dismissed him from his duties as a visiting professor. Uekusa maintained his innocence, saying that he was drunk when he was arrested and did not remember what happened that night. He was charged with chikan on October 4, 2006.

On January 22, 2007, Uekusa was released from Tokyo Detention House on bail of 6 million yen.

On October 16, 2007, Uekusa was sentenced to four months in prison by Tokyo District Court Presiding Judge Shō Kamisaka. He repeated his earlier denials, but fabric traces on his suit and witness testimony were enough to convince the court that he had groped under the victim's skirt. In handing down the sentence, Kamisaka noted that "The court cannot anticipate that the accused will be rehabilitated" on his own recognizance. Uekusa vowed to appeal, saying in a statement that "the truth will always prevail." On April 16, 2008, the Tokyo High Court upheld a four-month prison sentence for Uekusa. On June 25, 2009, the Supreme Court rejected Uekusa's final appeal.

In an interview with journalist Benjamin Fulford on June 19, 2008, he stated that he was arrested as part of a national politics investigation after criticizing the economic policies of Junichiro Koizumi and Heizō Takenaka on a television program.

== Bibliography ==
- The Political Economics of Interest rates, Foreign Exchanges, and Stock Prices (金利・為替・株価の政治経済学, Kinri kawase kabuka no seiji keizaigaku). Iwanami Shoten Publishing, Tokyo 1992, ISBN 4-00-004173-8
- The Future Japanese Economy: Resolutions for the Prosperity (これからの日本経済 景気回復への方策, Korekara no nihon keizai: Keiki kaifuku e no hosaku) with Kentaro Hasegawa. Gattkyusha, Tokyo 1993, ISBN 4051056368
- Japan's Bottom Line (日本の総決算, Nihon no sōkessan). Kodansha, Tokyo 1999, ISBN 4-06-206330-1
- Modern Japanese Economic Policy Theory (現代日本経済政策論, Gendai Nihon keizai seisakuron). Iwanami Shoten, Tokyo 2001, ISBN 4-00-026268-8
- Idealized Financing: Regeneration needs Marketing the Risks (あるべき金融 リスクの市場化なくして再生なし, Arubeki kinnyu: Risuku no shijoka nakushite saisei nashi) with Taichi Sakaiya and Takeaki Kariya. Toyo keizai shinposha, Tokyo 2003, ISBN 4492653341
- The Uekusa Report: Factors Defining FY2006 (ウエクサ・レポート 2006年を規定するファクター, Uekusa Repōto Nisenroku nen o Kitei suru Fakutā). Shisei Bungaku, Tokyo 2006 ISBN 4-902995-01-8
- Untold Truth - At The Detention Center (知られざる真実－勾留地にて－, Shirarezaru Shinjitsu - Koryuchi nite). Epushiron Publishing Project, Tokyo 2007, ISBN 490314528X
- Traitor's Last Days (売国者たちの末路, Baikokushatachi no Matsuro) with Takahiko Soejima. Shodensha, Tokyo 2009 ISBN 4-396-61334-2
- Independence of Japan From The Continued U.S. Occupation Since World War Two (日本の独立, Nihon no Dokuritsu). Asukashinshya, Tokyo 2010, ISBN 4864100489
- Regeneration of Japan: Breaking Away from the Declining Slavish Economy to the U.S. (日本の再生 機能不全に陥った対米隷属経済からの脱却, Nihon no saisei: Kino fuzen ni ochiitta taibei reizoku kara no dakkyaku). Seishisha, Tokyo 2011, ISBN 4905042321
- Increasing Consumption Taxes destroy the Country: Revise The Three Political Deception (消費増税亡国論 三つの政治ペテンを糺す!, Shohi zozei bokokuron: mitsu no seiji peten o tadasu). Asukashinsha, Tokyo 2012, ISBN 4864101639
- Miscarriage of justice: How the Government makes the Innocent Guilty (国家は「有罪(えんざい)」をこうして創る, Kokka wa enzai o koushite tsukuru) with Takahiko Soejima and Hirohiko Takahashi. Shodensha, Tokyo 2012 ISBN 439661425X
- Interest Rates・Foreign Exchange・Stock Prices' Changes: In Search of the Trap of Leading Towards Inflation (金利・為替・株価大躍動 ~インフレ誘導の罠を読み抜く, Kinri, Kawase, Kabukahendo: Infure yudo o yomitoku). Businesssha, Tokyo 2013, ISBN 4828417044
- The Cursed Plague of The Slavish Obedience to the United States (鳩山由紀夫 孫崎享 植草一秀 「対米従属」という宿痾(しゅくあ), Taibei juzoku toiu shukua) with Ukeru Magosaki and Yukio Hatoyama. Asukashinsha, Tokyo 2013, ISBN 4864102546
- Abenorisk:The Seven Sins that Meltdown Japan (アベノリスク 日本を融解させる7つの大罪, Abenorisk: Nihon o yukai saseru nanatsu no taizai). Kodansha, Tokyo 2013, ISBN 4062184656
- 20 Intelligentsia approaching The Truth of Ozawa Incident: Question of the Conspiracy of authorities and the media (20人の識者がみた「小沢事件」の真実―捜査権力とメディアの共犯関係を問う！, Nijunin no shikisha ga mita Ozawa jiken no shinjitsu: Sosakenryoku to medhia no kyohan kankei o tou). Nihonbungeisha, Tokyo 2013, ISBN 4537260521
- The Collapse of Japanese Economy:The Terror of Reactionary Policy (日本経済撃墜 -恐怖の政策逆噴射-, Nihon keizai gekitsui: Kyofu no seisaku gyakufunsha). Businesssha, Tokyo 2013, ISBN 4828417346
