= Next to You (Melody song) =

Single by melody.

from the album Be as One
- B-side: "Summer Memory"
- Released: January 12, 2005 (Japan)
- Genre: J-Pop
- Length: 16:53
- Label: Toy's Factory

Melody. singles chronology
"Believe Me" (2004)	"Next to You" (2005)	"Realize/Take a Chance" (2005)

"Next to You" is the fifth single by melody. under the Toy's Factory label released January 12, 2005. The single stayed on the Oricon Singles Chart for 6 weeks and peaked at number 14. To date, the single has sold 21,876 copies.

== Track listing ==
1. Next to You (4:37)
2. Summer Memory (4:27)
3. So into You (Only One Remix) (3:14)
4. Next to You (instrumental) (4:35)
