= Television personalities in Japan =

Celebrities who regularly appear in mass media in Japan

Television personalities in Japan, known as tarento (タレント; derived from Portuguese talento) in Japanese, are celebrities who regularly appear in mass media in Japan, especially as panelists on variety shows.

== Careers ==
Tetsuko Kuroyanagi hosts a daytime talk show Tetsuko's Room (徹子の部屋, Tetsuko no Heya). This program, as of 2022, has been broadcast for 47 years and more than 11,000 times, repeatedly winning Guinness World Records.

Japanese television programs often feature these media personalities. Many, sometimes dozens at a time, are called in to take part in these prime time shows. Their participation in these programs varies greatly and includes performing, voicing opinions, mimicking fellow celebrities in a practice called monomane, taking part in game shows, joking or just being present for the entire duration of the show (known as being part of the "gallery").

While it is very common for tarento to appear in serious Japanese television drama or movies, they are distinguished from mainstream actors by the fact that, where an actor might go on variety television to advertise their latest venture, tarento often appear on variety shows with no apparent promotional agenda outside of a personal one.

Often, tarento, whether men or women, have notoriously short career spans (around one or two years) and their earning capabilities are not as high as popularly imagined. The vast majority make just enough to maintain a middle-class lifestyle in Tokyo, Japan's media capital. This is because their talent agencies take a majority share of their earnings for the appearances that they make on TV. Part of the money given up by the tarento is to pay for initial support the agencies gave them in terms of free housing, financial stipends, and promotion of that person. These cuts can sometimes be as much as 90%. However, their work achieves social prominence (and all the associated benefits) and a successful tarento career can be the launching point for a career as movie actor or even political figure. Tarento who are unable to leverage their career into something larger sometimes slowly fade away into eventual obscurity.

Important considerations for tarento include the degree to which their names are publicly known (知名度, chimeido), which is the Japanese equivalent of a Q Score, the degree to which they are generally liked by the public (好感度, kōkando), and the character or personality by which they are known (often just "chara"). The distinction between the first two terms is an important one, as celebrities such as Egashira 2:50 might be widely disliked by audiences and still make a living; being disliked is a part of their character. Additional elements of a tarento's character may include their origins and other careers (e.g., author/illustrator Lily Franky), intelligence (e.g., Masaru Hamaguchi, a comedian who once misspelled his own name on a televised test), hobbies and skills (many female celebrities are known for how well or poorly they can cook, from the former members of Pink Lady on the high end of the continuum to race queen Yinling on the low end) or appearance (many non-Japanese talents such as Bobby Ologun use their looks to this effect). The way by which a person becomes tarento can more often than not be categorized.

== Types ==
=== Multi-tarento ===
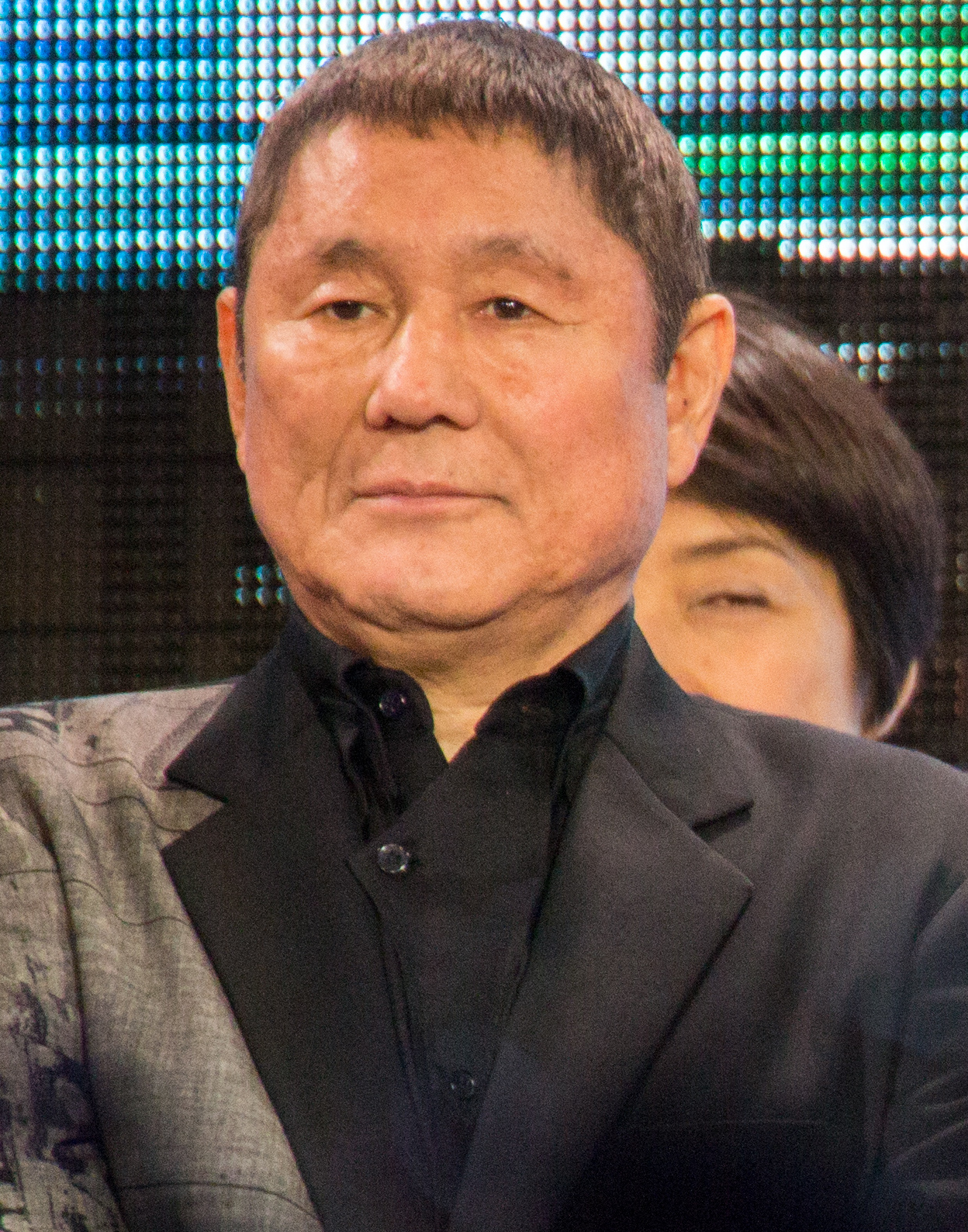
Takeshi Kitano

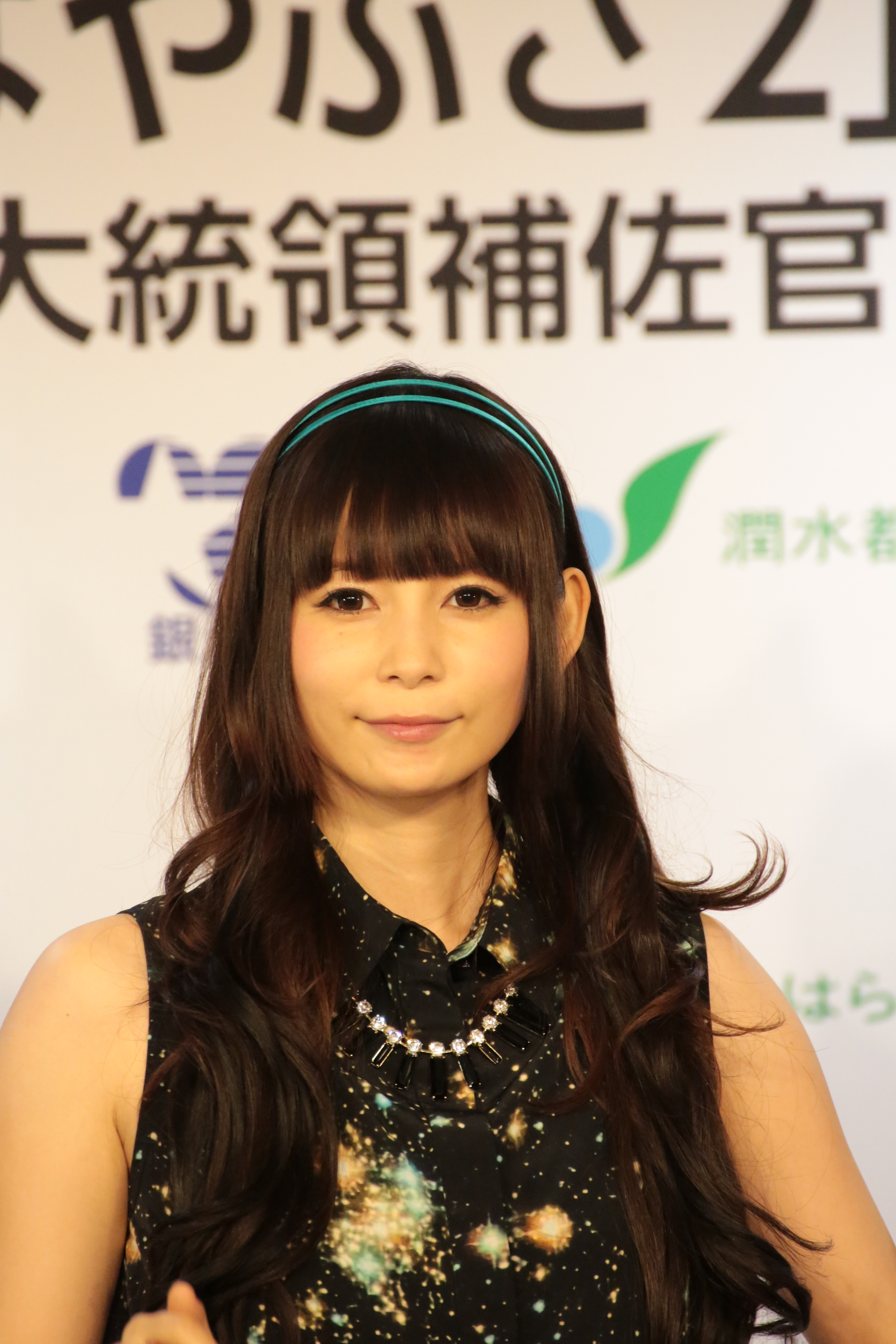
Shoko Nakagawa

Celebrities that have established themselves or are/were active in another field within the industry are considered to be multi-tarento. These people usually come from a different background within the entertainment industry than just appearing on television programs. They then transition into becoming television personalities. Multi-tarento can be actors, musical artists, models, voice actors, directors or anyone known for their work within the industry. In the United States and European countries, Takeshi Kitano is recognized as a prominent director, but is still evaluated as a "multi-talent" in Japan and still appears on Japanese talk shows in a humorous context. Other examples are IKKO, Shoko Nakagawa and Shinobu Sakagami.

=== Owarai tarento ===
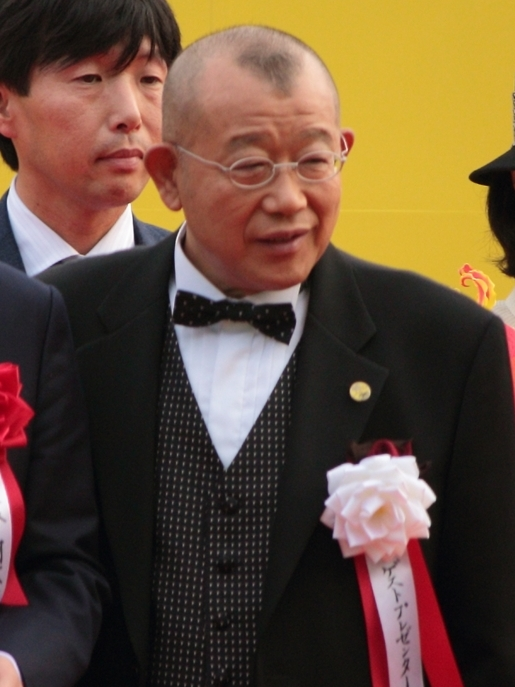
Shōfukutei Tsurube II

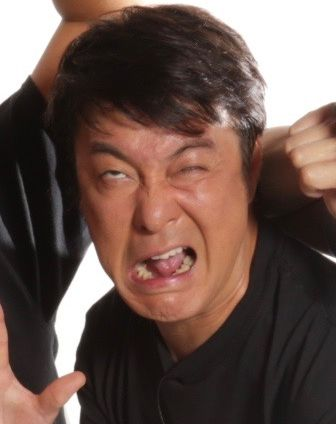
Kōji Katō

'Owarai' is Japanese for laughter, or in this case a "comic talent". Owarai tarento are generally former comedians, often in manzai (type of stand up), who, after becoming famous, make appearances on variety television programs that are comedic in nature.

Owarai tarento have different genres and cast-types on television programs. In variety shows, they are generally cast to create comedic effect and to keep conversation flowing. Some owarai tarento become MCs (Masters of Ceremony) in later stages of their career, where they direct the flow of a program and often the most important individuals for the show. The MCs are usually those with exceptional conversational abilities and reaction, as they hold an important role. Examples are Shinya Ueda, Sanma Akashiya, Shōfukutei Tsurube II and George Tokoro.

See list of Japanese comedians.

=== Nepotic tarento ===
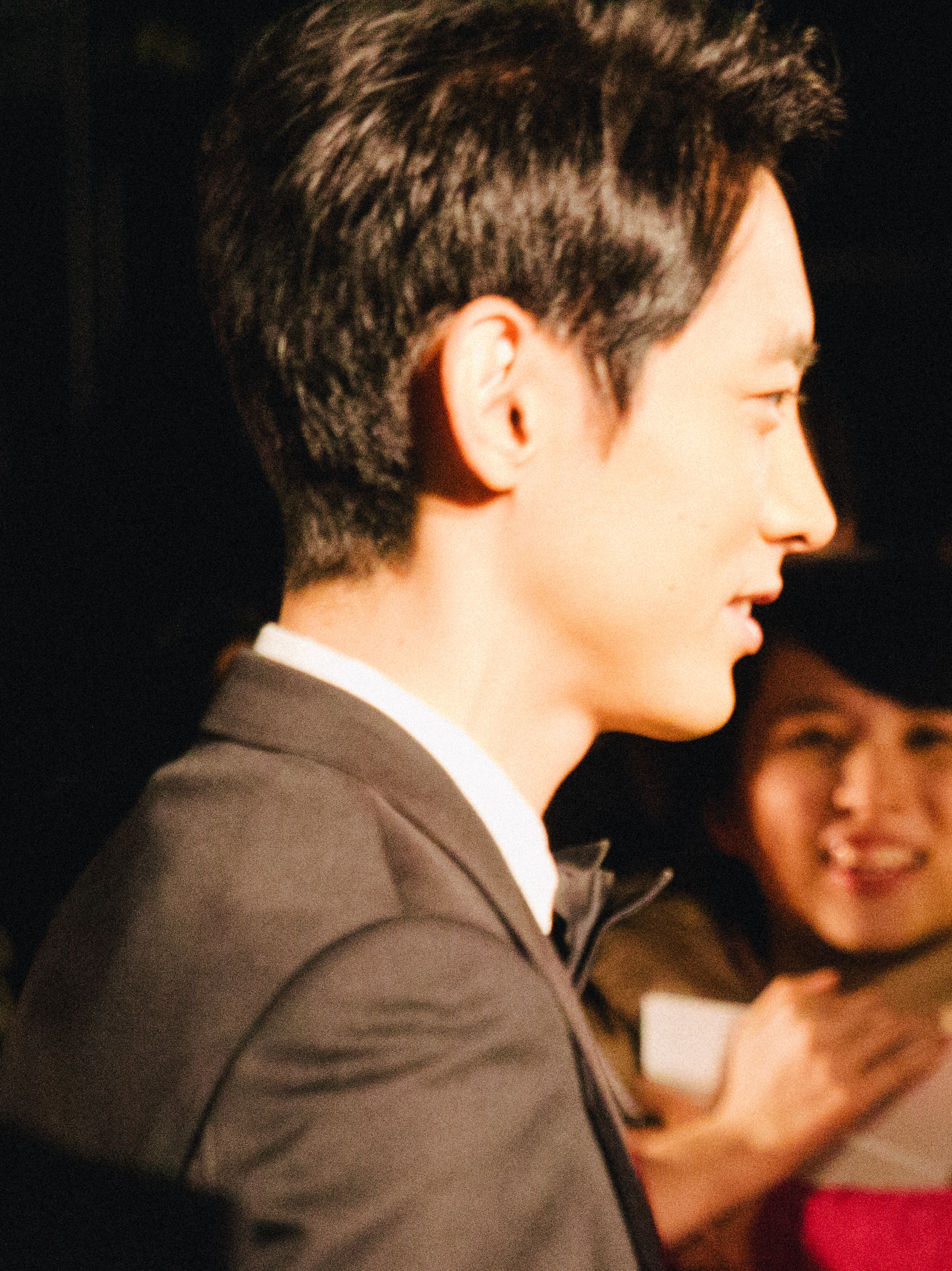
Kotaro Koizumi

Sometimes, Tarento are given prominent air time on TV and are promoted heavily due to their association or relationship to an established celebrity or politician, and not because they possess any discernible skills for entertaining audiences. One of the bigger examples of this phenomenon is Kazushige Nagashima, the son of the legendary Yomiuri Giants player and manager Shigeo Nagashima. After a nine-year career as a professional baseball player, he turned to the entertainment circuit and used his father's name to make inroads. The son of controversial Tokyo governor Shintaro Ishihara, Yoshizumi Ishihara, has also achieved a measure of exposure due to nepotism as well as Kotaro Koizumi, son of former Prime Minister Junichiro Koizumi.

=== Athlete tarento ===
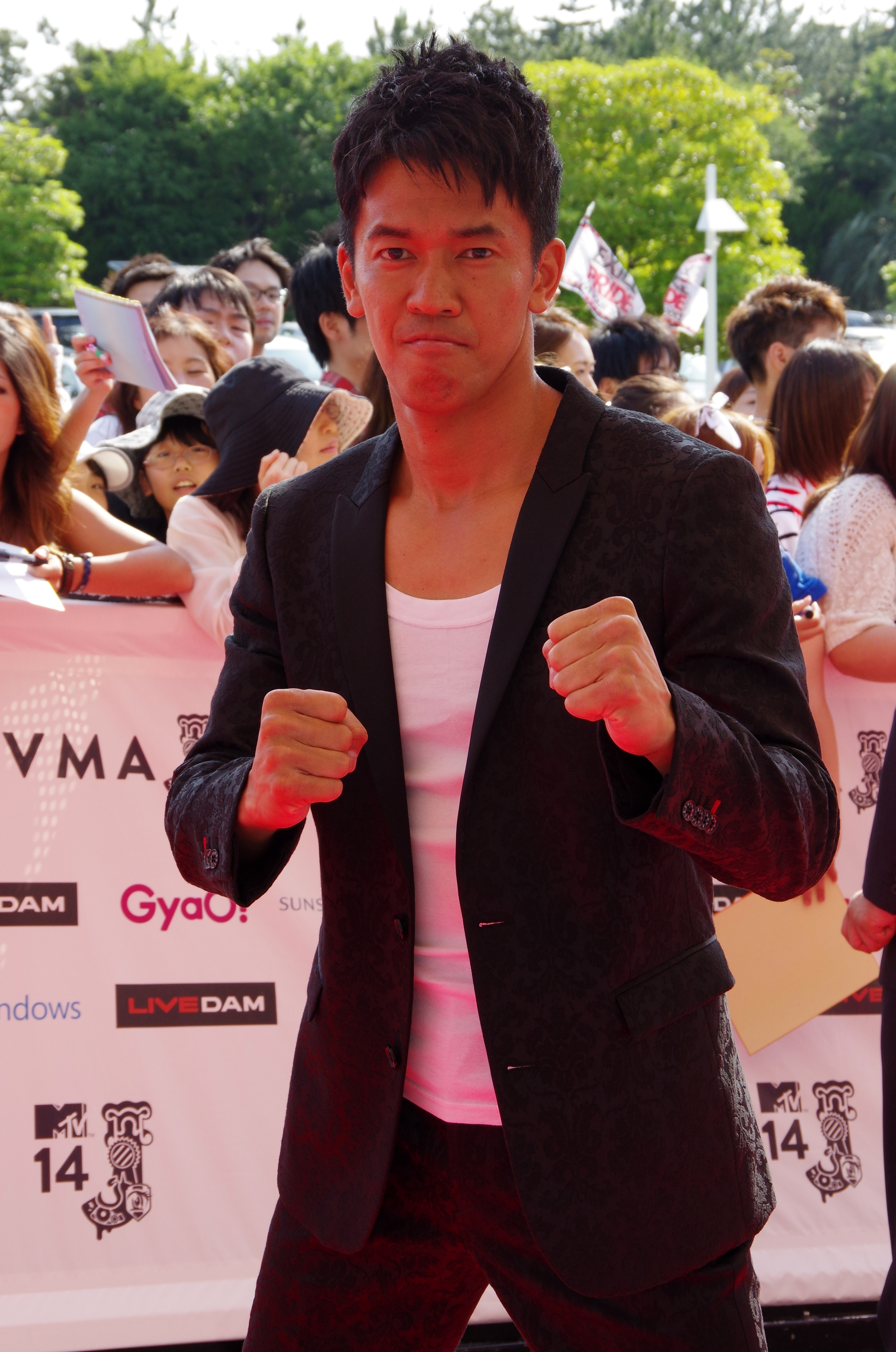
Sō Takei

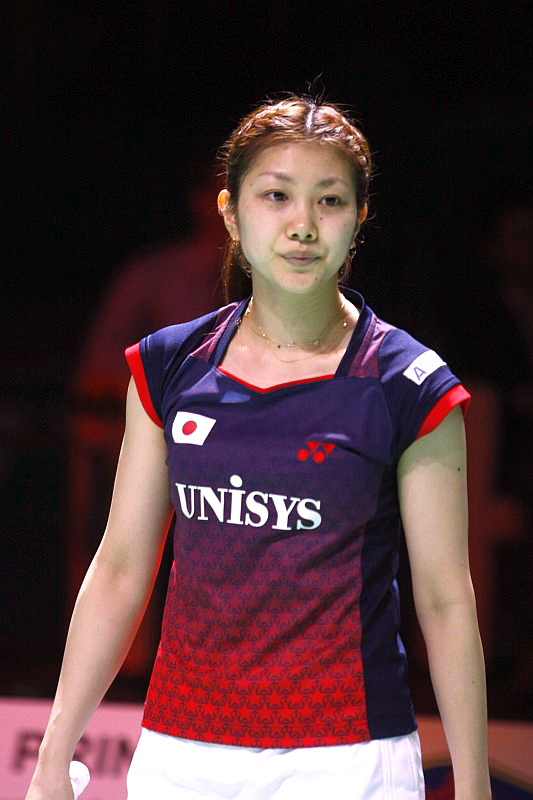
Reiko Shiota

These are usually former athletes who flourished as sportspeople and have retired to become a tarento in the entertainment industry. Due to their achievements as athletes in their respective sports, they garner a good deal of attention and often become successful television personalities. Athlete tarento can be active athletes as well, although most often they do not enter the entertainment industry until after retirement. Examples are Masakiyo Maezono, Karina Maruyama, So Takei, Konishiki Yasokichi, and Saori Yoshida.

=== Gimmicked tarento ===
These are people on programs that have a "trademarked" phrase, wardrobe, or mannerism that is used to elicit laughs from the audience. Their on-TV characters tend to be very shallow as they milk the comic device or neta (ネタ) that gave them notoriety and hardly ever expand on their character. It is these figures that tend to have the shortest shelf life on TV as they quickly fade into obscurity after the novelty of their act wears off. They are known in Japan as ippatsuya (一発屋), or "one trick ponies". Examples are Yoshio Kojima, Dandy Sakano, and Razor Ramon Hard Gay.

=== Idol tarento ===
Additionally, Tarento, both male and female, may be discovered and be given considerable exposure due to their perceived physical beauty and endowments, but the way they are promoted is different from being strictly a fashion model. This is because they spend time making music CDs, star vehicles, and television appearances that capitalize on their physical beauty or on-screen charisma. These people are occasionally referred to as obaka-aidoru or "dumb idols". Many of the men that fall into this category come from Johnny & Associates, a male talent agency.

=== Gaijin tarento ===
A gaikokujin tarento (外国人タレント), also known as gaijin tarento (外人タレント) and abbreviated gaitare, is a foreign celebrity active exclusively or almost exclusively in Japan. The phrase literally means "foreign talent". Having at least a conversational level Japanese, combined with foreign looks as well as a standout personality, they are often chosen because they meet the Japanese stereotypes of foreigners (for example, the notion that Americans generally look rugged and have blond hair and blue eyes). Gaikokujin tarento are seen as curiosities by the Japanese, just as other tarento, and are cast differently depending on their ethnicities. In the 1991 documentary "The Japanese Version", veteran foreign personality, Dave Spector, stated, "[I'm] doing things like the lowest bozo, circus kind of stuff. But it doesn't bother me at all. A lot of times the foreigners on TV, models and what-not, are compared to pandas. They use that term here—pandas—because they're cuddly, you can go and have fun with them, and throw a marshmallow and that's about it. And you don't get involved any deeper than that. But ... since I'm making half a million dollars a year, I'm very happy to be a panda."

Gaijin tarento largely inspire interest in the Japanese viewer due to their use of the Japanese language, a feat considered especially remarkable by the Japanese. Native Japanese speakers consider their language to be especially difficult to learn due to the depth of ritual expressions, methods of referring to the self and others, and indirect and empathetic speech. These skills are viewed as unlikely and impressive in a non-native Japanese speaker. Thus the main attraction of gaijin tarento is not their talent or fame but their clown-like clumsy use of the Japanese language, which serves to further define the Japanese as 'those who can speak Japanese'. Gaijin tarento is overall an objectification of foreigners that reinforces the separateness, uniqueness, and specialness of "Japaneseness".

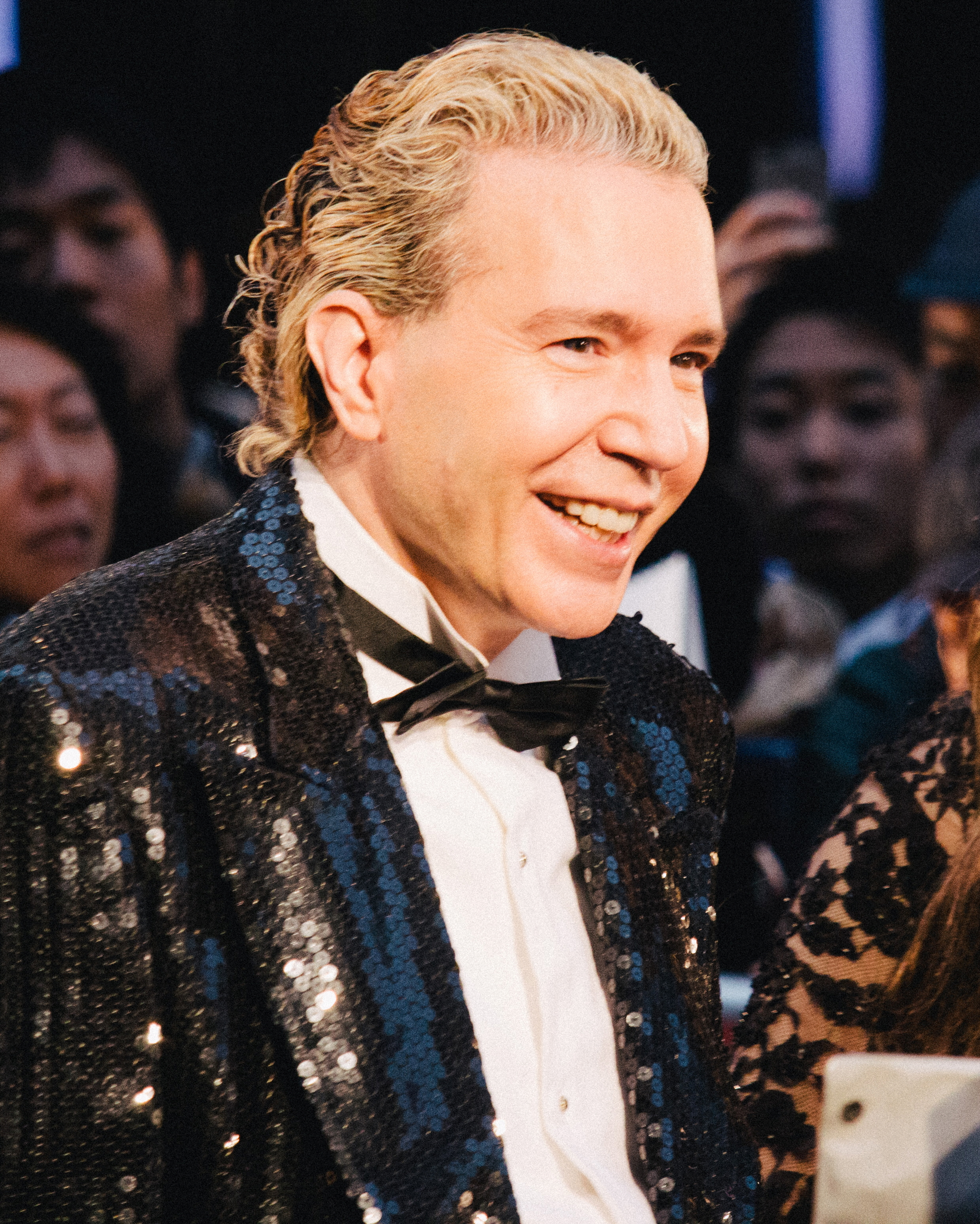
Dave Spector

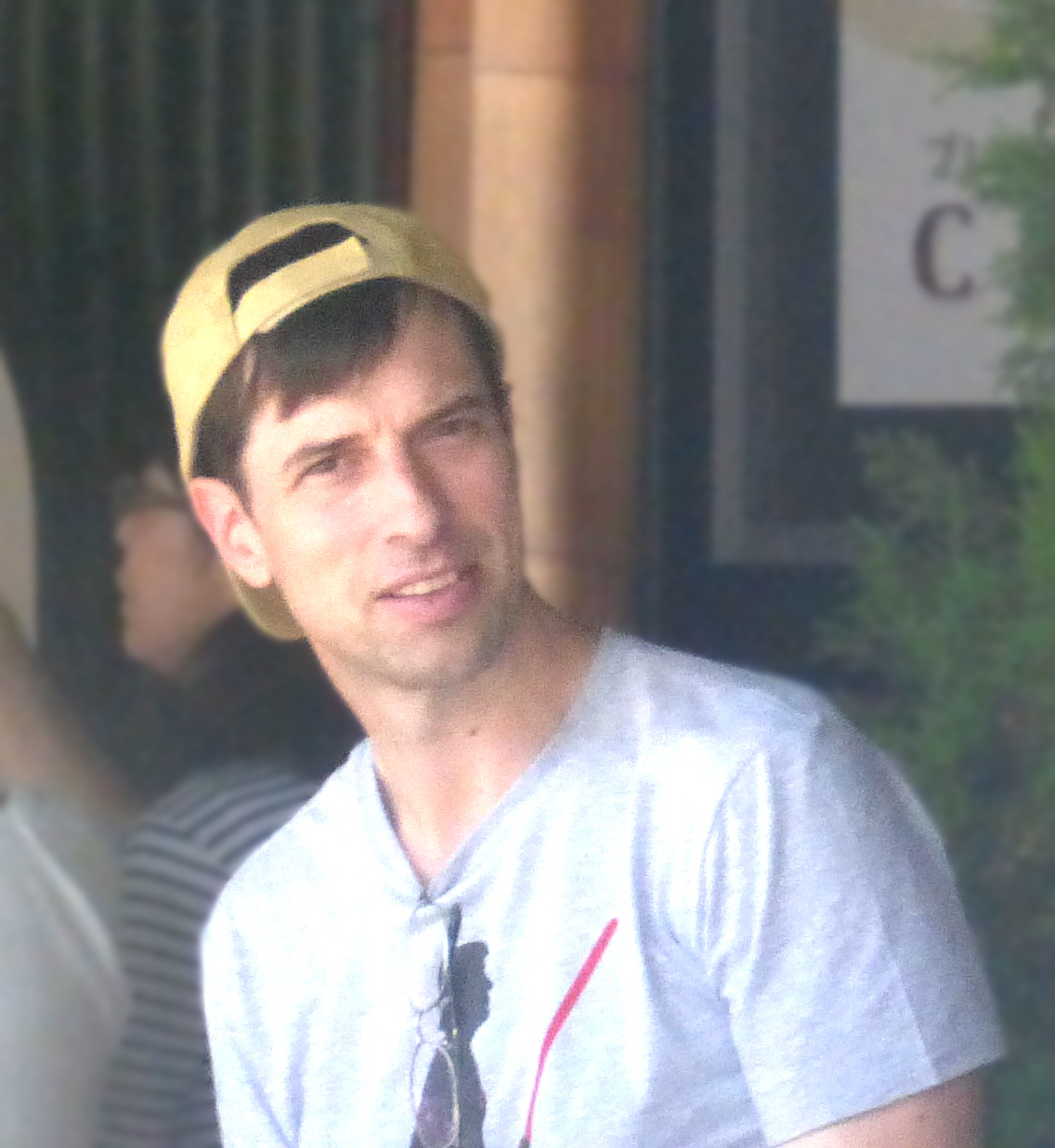
Patrick Harlan

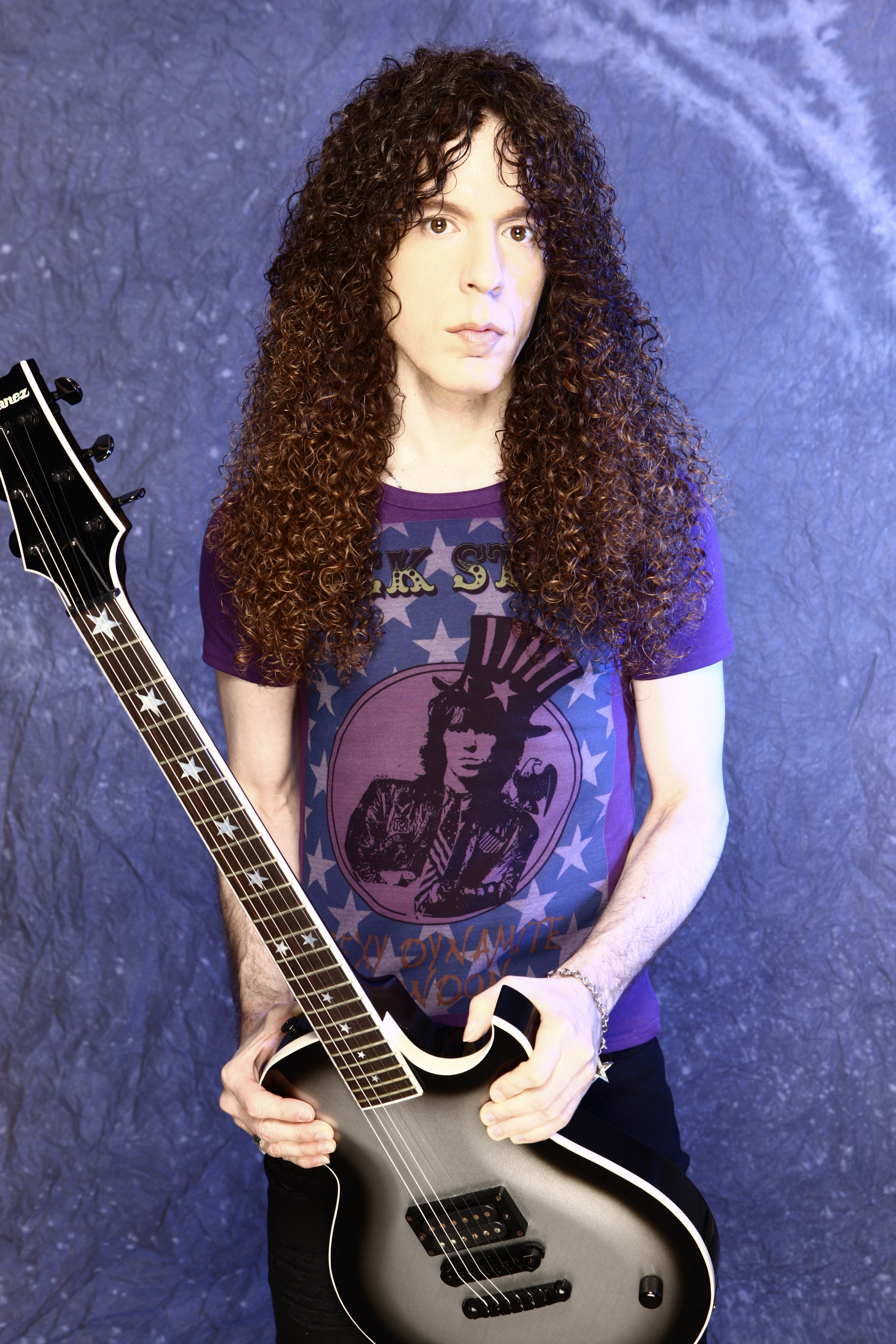
Marty Friedman

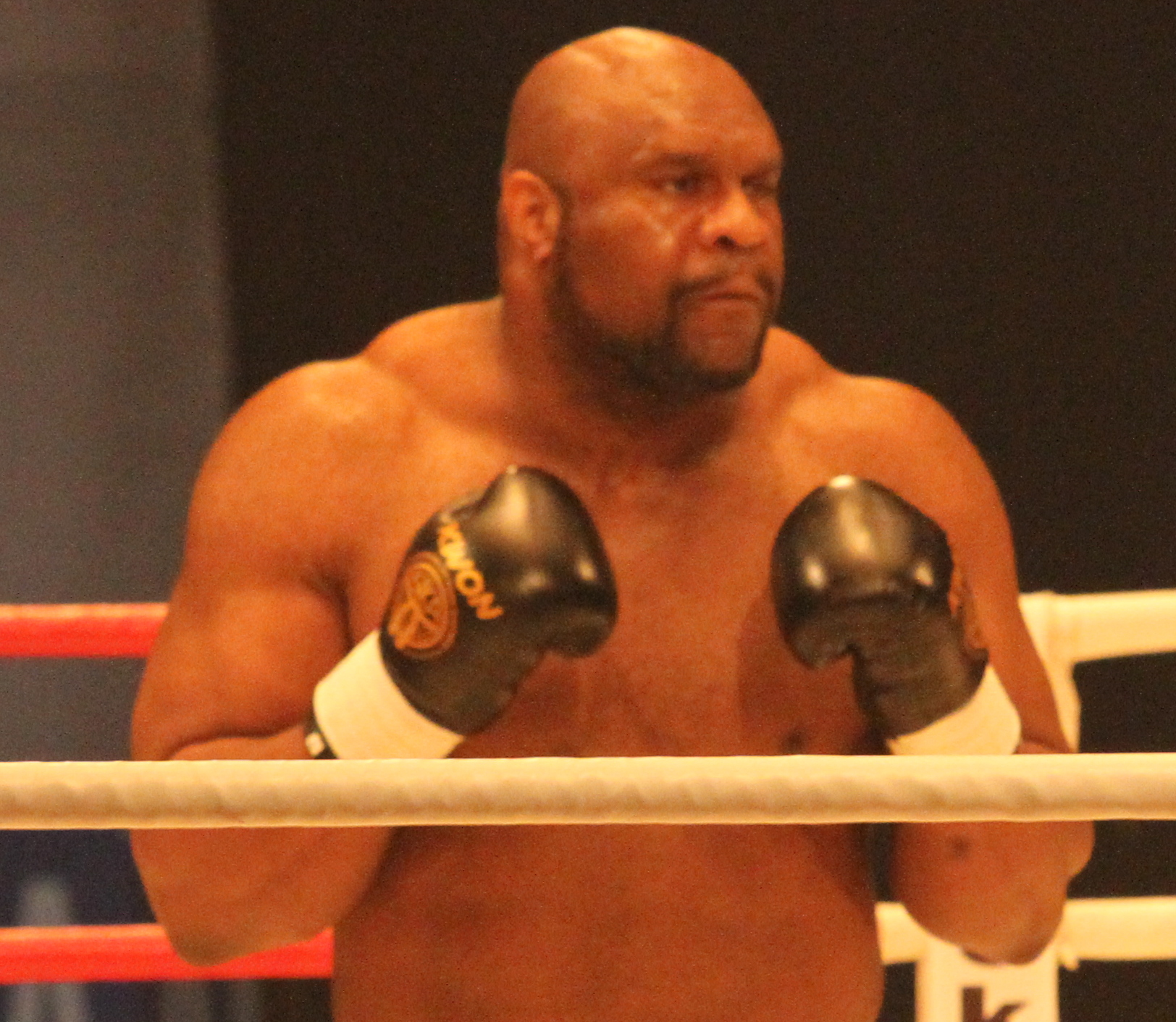
Bob Sapp

== Maintaining relevance ==
Occasionally, people will become tarento as a result of a directional shift in their career due to a loss of popularity and relevance in their original field. It is especially common for musicians to become tarento due to the tremendous turnover in acts that are featured by record labels. Some examples include Kiriko Isono, who debuted as part of a singing trio and made a name for herself based on a rapid wit and willingness to put herself down for a laugh; Mari Yaguchi, the third leader of Morning Musume who left the group in 2005 due to a scandal but has continued to appear on variety shows and Japanese television drama since leaving; the late Ai Iijima, a former porn starlet; and Yūsuke Santamaria, who fronted several bands before moving into acting and being a tarento. Fashion modeling can also provide an entry path, with such examples as Rinka and Aya Sugimoto.

== See also ==
- Model
- Talent scout
- Talent show
- Talent manager
