= Three-Nations Research Institute =

Japanese research institute

Three-Nations Research Institute Co., Ltd. (スリーネーションズリサーチ株式会社) is a company that offers information about international politics and economy, and does investment consulting based in Minato, Tokyo, Japan. It was established on April 1, 2005. Its company's founder and chairman is Japanese former professor of graduate school at Waseda University, economist Kazuhide Uekusa.

== Company's business ==
- Publication of "Interest, Exchange, Stock prices flash" (Membership system report)
- Giving lectures
- Planning and administration of lectures, classes about economy, management, and investment
- Investigation about economy, trust of research business
- Publication of books and magazines
- Planning, administration, and enforcement of special events
- Consulting about investments
