= Tokudane! =

Japanese morning news program, 1999–2021

- Japanese: 情報プレゼンター とくダネ!

Production
- Running time: 110 minutes
- Production company: Fuji Television

Original release
- Network: FNS (Fuji TV)
- Release: April 1, 1999 – March 26, 2021

Tokudane! (情報プレゼンター とくダネ!) was a weekday morning news program airing on Fuji TV in Japan. It was first broadcast on April 1, 1999, and currently airs from 08:00 to 09:50 Mondays to Fridays. Air time of this program previously was from 8:00 to 9:55 until March 29, 2013. The program ended on March 26, 2021, and was replaced by Mezamashi 8 by the following week.

== Presenters ==
=== Main presenters ===
==== Anchor ====
- Tomoaki Ogura (April 1, 1999 – March 26, 2021)

==== Main assistants ====
- Shinsuke Kasai (April 1, 1999 – March 26, 2021)
- Yaeko Umezu (March 24, 2014 – March 31, 2019)
- Yuka Ebihara (October 2, 2017 – March 31, 2019)

==== Sub-assistants ====
- Shotaro Kinoshita (March 24, 2014 – March 26, 2021)
- Sayaka Morimoto (October 2, 2006 – March 26, 2021)
- Ayako Yamanaka (March 24, 2014 – March 26, 2021)

==== Show-biz reporter ====
- Chumei Maeda (April 1, 1999 – March 26, 2021)

==== Weather ====
- Takeshi Amatatsu (October 3, 2005 – March 26, 2021)

=== Past presenters ===
==== Main assistants ====
- Kyoko Sasaki (April 1, 1999 – March 27, 2009)
- Minako Nakano (March 30, 2009 – June 29, 2012)
- Rei Kikukawa (July 2, 2012 – September 29, 2017)

==== Sub-assistants ====
- Yutaka Hasegawa (April 2, 2001 – September 24, 2010)
- Daiki Tanaka (September 27, 2010 – March 21, 2014)
- Yumi Kasuga (April 1, 1999 – September 29, 2006)
- Reina Uchida (March 24, 2014 – September 18, 2015)

=== Former regular commentators ===
- Dave Spector (Wednesday)
- Hiroko Mita (Wednesday)
- Seiko Niizuma (Thursday)
- Tetsuya Bessho (Friday)
- Manami Hashimoto (Friday)

=== Notable past commentators ===
- Kaori Manabe
- Kazuhide Uekusa

== Theme music ==
Opening and ending theme: "Good One" (Kay, until March 2021)

=== Past ===
- April 1999 to March 2003: "Veronica" (Elvis Costello)
- April 2003 to September 2005: "Shout to the Top!" (opening) / "My Ever Changing Moods" (ending) (The Style Council)
- October 2005 to September 2007: "Don't Get Me Wrong" (The Pretenders)
- October 2007 to March 2009: "We Built This City" (Starship)
- April 2009 to March 2011: "Invisible Touch" (Genesis)
- April 2011 to March 2012: "Heaven Is a Place on Earth" (Belinda Carlisle)
- April 2012 to September 2012: "Tell Her About It" (Billy Joel)
- October 2012 to March 2014: "Tubthumping" (Chumbawamba)
- March 2014 to March 2018: "Morning Cheers" (pal@pop)
- April 2018 to March 2019: "Rainbow" (Kay)
- March to September 2019: "Tap Knock DaNce" (Yuta Mori)
- September 2019 to March 2021: "Good One" (Kay)
