= Simple as That/Over the Rainbow =

"Simple As That/Over the Rainbow"

Single by melody.

from the album Sincerely
- Released: June 18, 2003 (Japan)
- Genre: J-Pop
- Length: 11:04
- Label: Toy's Factory

Melody. singles chronology
"Dreamin' Away" (2003)	"Simple As That/Over the Rainbow" (2003)	"Miss You" (2003)

"Simple As That/Over the Rainbow" is the second single by melody. under the Toy's Factory label released June 18, 2003. The single stayed on the Oricon Singles Chart for 5 weeks and peaked at number 29. To date, the single has sold 14,608 copies.

== Track listing ==
1. Simple As That (4:20)
2. Over the Rainbow (3:14)
3. Simple As That: BL Remix (3:30)
