= Dreamin' Away =

2003 single by Melody Miyuki Ishikawa

Single by melody.

from the album Sincerely
- B-side: "Now, 24 seven"
- Released: February 19, 2003 (Japan)
- Genre: J-pop
- Length: 14:50
- Label: Toy's Factory
- Songwriter(s): Robb K Boldt, Stacy Ferguson, Stefanie Ridel, Renee I Sandstrom

Melody. singles chronology
"Dreamin' Away" (2003)	"Simple as That/Over the Rainbow" (2003)

"Dreamin' Away" is the debut single by melody. under the Toy's Factory label released February 19, 2003. The single stayed on the Oricon charts for 8 weeks and peaked at number 33. To date, the single has sold 20,054 copies.

== Track listing ==
1. Dreamin' Away (3:18)
2. Now (3:33)
3. 24: Seven (3:30)
4. Dreamin' Away: Remix (4:59)
