= The Best of Melody: Timeline =

The Best of melody.: Timeline

Compilation album by melody.
- Released: October 8, 2008 (Japan)
- Recorded: 2002–2007
- Genre: J-Pop
- Length: 1:11:14
- Label: Toy's Factory

Melody. chronology
Lei Aloha (2008)	The Best of melody.: Timeline (2008)	TBA

Alternative cover
- CD + DVD cover

Timeline is the first "best-of" compilation album by Japanese pop singer melody., released on October 8, 2008. It includes all of her a-sides from her debut single Dreamin' Away to her most recent single, Haruka. It was released in a CD-only edition as well as a CD + DVD edition and includes no new songs. A few b-sides are included, as well as a collaboration single with M-Flo.

This album is also her last release with Toy's Factory.

== Track listing ==
=== CD ===
1. Dreamin' Away
2. Simple As That
3. Over the Rainbow
4. Crystal Love
5. Believe Me
6. So into You
7. Next to You
8. Realize
9. Take a Chance
10. See You...
11. Lovin' U
12. Finding My Road
13. My Dear
14. Love Story
15. Haruka (遥花～はるか～; Eternal Flower)
16. Miss You (M-Flo Melody. & Ryohei Yamamoto) (Bonus Track)

=== DVD ===
1. Dreamin' Away (PV)
2. Simple As That (PV)
3. Crystal Love (PV)
4. Believe Me (PV)
5. Next to You (PV)
6. Realize (PV)
7. See You... (PV)
8. Lovin' U (PV)
9. Finding My Road (PV)
10. Love Story (PV)
11. Haruka (遥花～はるか～; Eternal Flower) (PV)
12. Miss You (M-Flo Melody. & Ryohei Yamamoto) (PV)
