= Masters W80 high jump world record progression =

This is the progression of world record improvements of the high jump W80 division of Masters athletics.

Key

Incomplete information Pending

| Height | Athlete | Nationality | Birthdate | Location | Date |
|---|---|---|---|---|---|
| 1.10 | Rosemary Chrimes | United Kingdom | 19.05.1933 | Porto Alegre | 21.10.2013 |
| 1.08 i | Christa Happ | Germany | 25.12.1929 | Magdeburg | 29.01.2010 |
| 1.04 | Helgi Pedel | Canada | 21.01.1924 | Toronto | 19.06.2004 |
| 0.95 | Margaret Hinton | United States | 14.08.1919 | Orono | 10.08.2002 |
| 0.94 | Mary Bowermaster | United States | 26.07.1917 | Orlando | 19.10.1999 |
| 0.93 | Margareta Thesleff Sarvana | Finland | 30.08.1908 | Espoo | 21.07.1990 |
