= Masters M85 100 metres world record progression =

This is the progression of world record improvements of the 100 metres M85 division of Masters athletics.

Key

Incomplete information Wind aided Pending

Hand	Auto	Wind	Athlete	Nationality	Birthdate	Location	Date
	15.08	1.9	Hiroo Tanaka	Japan	08.12.1930	Akita	25.06.2017
	15.97	0.5	Yoshiyuki Shimizu	Brazil	14.07.1928	Porto Alegre	19.10.2013
	16.13		Roderick Parker	United States	09.11.1918	Catoosa	17.07.2004
	16.22	0.0	Roderick Parker	United States	09.11.1918	Decatur	06.08.2004
	16.16	1.3	Giichi Suda	Japan	16.09.1912	Konosu	23.08.1998
16.0			Vittorio Colo	Italy	09.11.1911	Santhià	28.06.1997
16.3			Duncan McLean	United Kingdom	22.12.1884	San Diego	06.07.1973
