= Be as One =

Studio album by Melody Ishikawa
- Released: April 12, 2006 (Japan)
- Recorded: 2004–2006
- Genre: J-Pop
- Length: 51:52
- Label: Toy's Factory

Melody Ishikawa chronology
Sincerely (2004)	Be as One (2006)	Ready to Go! (2007)

Alternative covers
- CD+DVD Cover

Singles from Be as One
- 1. "Next to You" Released: January 12, 2005; 2. "Realize/Take a Chance" Released: August 17, 2005; 3. "See You..." Released: February 15, 2006

Be as One is the second album released by Melody Ishikawa. The「CD+DVD」version is Limited edition.

== Track listing ==
=== CD ===
1. Be as One (4:13)
2. See You... (4:24)
3. De ja Vu (3:22)
4. Realize (3:48)
5. Close Your Eyes: English Version (5:19)
6. Promises (3:40)
7. Dear Love (2:46)
8. Take a Chance (4:23)
9. Next to You (4:35)
10. Stay with Me (4:48)
11. Gift of Love (4:56)
12. Miss You: Nagareboshi Remix (M-Flo Loves Melody. & Yamamoto Ryohei) (5:38)

=== DVD ===
- Music clip & TV-CM
1. Next to You
2. Realize
3. See You...
- making of "See You..."
