= Yasuji Ohagi =

- Born: 7 April 1978 (age 48); Miyazaki, Japan
- Genre: Classical
- Occupation: Guitarist
- Instrument: Classical guitar
- Years active: 2000 - present
- Label: Victor Entertainment
- Website: Yasuji Ohagi - unofficial fan site

Yasuji Ohagi (大萩康司, Ohagi Yasuji) is a Japanese classical guitarist. He has been named a "guitar poet" by Japanese newspaper Mainichi Shinbun.

== Biography ==
Ohagi studied with Japanese guitarist Shin-Ichi Fukuda. In 1998, he won the second place of the Havana International Guitar Competition while studying in France. Two years later, Ohagi made his debut and since then has released 14 music albums. Among diverse music styles, several of Ohagi's recordings pays tribute to Latinamerican music including compositions of Argentinian Piazzolla, Cuban Leo Brouwer, Brazilian Sérgio Assad, and others. Ohagi has performed concerts in several countries. He has been invited to perform with National Symphony Orchestra of Cuba; in 2014, he performed at the International Guitar Festival Compensar in Colombia, and, in 2010, completed a successful tour around Canada with Japanese artist Kazunori Seo (flute) and Gentaro Kagitom (violin).

Paraguayan guitarist Berta Rojas invited Ohagi to be jury member of the 2011 Worldwide Barrios Competition in honor to Agustin Barrios; he has been juror of other major international competitions. Ohagi is also faculty at the Senzoku Gakuen College of Music and has inspired new guitarists around the world.
