= Believe Me (Melody song) =

Single by melody.
- B-side: "So into You"
- Released: June 9, 2004 (Japan)
- Genre: J-Pop
- Length: 17:11 (Japanese Version); 17:15 (English Version)
- Label: Toy's Factory

Melody. singles chronology
"Crystal Love" (2003)	"Believe Me" (2004)	"Next to You" (2005)

Believe Me (English Version)

"Believe Me" is the fourth single by melody. under the Toy's Factory label released June 9, 2004. The single was completed in two versions, English and Japanese, released simultaneously. The Japanese version peaked at #16 on the Oricon, and sold 17,539 copies. The English version peaked at #30 on the Oricon, and sold 11,950 copies.

== Track listing (Japanese Version) ==
1. Believe Me (Japanese Version) (4:39)
2. So into You (Japanese Version) (3:57)
3. Believe Me (Instrumental) (4:39)
4. So into You (Instrumental) (3:56)

== Track listing (English Version) ==
1. Believe Me (English Version) (4:41)
2. So into You (English Version) (3:57)
3. Believe Me (Instrumental) (4:41)
4. So into You (Instrumental) (3:56)
