= Finding My Road =

Single by melody.

from the album Ready to Go!
- B-side: "Fragile, My Dear"
- Released: February 14, 2007 (Japan)
- Recorded: 2006
- Genre: J-Pop
- Length: 4:32
- Label: Toy's Factory

Melody. singles chronology
| "Lovin' U" (2006) | "Finding My Road" (2007) | "Love Story" (2007) |

CD + DVD

"Finding My Road" is the ninth single by melody. under the Toy's Factory label released February 14, 2007. The Japanese single stayed on the Oricon Singles Chart for 5 weeks and peaked at number 13. To date, the single has sold 17,594 copies.

== Track listing ==
1. Finding My Road
2. Fragile
3. My Dear
4. Finding My Road: SiZK "Water Drop" MiX
