= Realize/Take a Chance =

Single by melody.

from the album Be as One
- Released: August 17, 2005 (Japan)
- Genre: J-Pop
- Length: 22:00
- Label: Toy's Factory

Melody. singles chronology
"Next to You" (2005)	"Realize/Take a Chance" (2005)	"See You..." (2006)

"Realize/Take a Chance" is the sixth single by melody. under the Toy's Factory label. It was released August 17, 2005. The single stayed on the Oricon Singles Chart for 16 weeks and peaked at number 6. To date, the single has sold 127,869 copies. This is melody.'s best-selling single. It was used as the theme song for the drama Dragon Zakura.

== Track listing ==
1. Realize (3:45)
2. Take a Chance (4:23)
3. Next to You (Fredisco Remix) (5:44)
4. Realize (instrumental) (3:45)
5. Take a Chance (instrumental) (4:23)
