= Masters W75 javelin world record progression =

Masters W75 javelin world record progression is the progression of world record improvements of the javelin throw W75 division of Masters athletics. Records must be set in properly conducted, official competitions under the standing IAAF rules unless modified by World Masters Athletics. The W75 division consists of female athletes who have reached the age of 75 but have not yet reached the age of 80, so exactly from their 75th birthday to the day before their 80th birthday. The W75 division throws a 400g implement.

Key

Incomplete information Pending

Distance	Athlete	Nationality	Birthdate	Location	Date
29.92	Evaun B. Williams	United Kingdom	19.12.1937	Porto Alegre	22.10.2013
28.81	Evaun B. Williams	United Kingdom	19.12.1937	Birmingham	15.09.2013
26.42	Evaun B. Williams	United Kingdom	19.12.1937	London	10.03.2013
26.21	Birutė Kaledienė	Lithuania	02.02.1933	Malmö	04.09.2008
23.84	Rachel Hanssens	Belgium	06.04.1929	Poznań	20.07.2006
23.06	Ethel Lehmann	United States	24.11.1929	Pittsburgh	09.06.2005
23.02	Johanna Gelbrich	Germany	19.01.1913	Budapest	04.07.1990
