= Yuka Ebihara (announcer) =

Japanese TV presenter

- 海老原 優香
- Born: 3 April 1994 (age 31); Tokyo, Japan
- Education: Gakushuin University Faculty of Literature English English & American Culture
- Years active: 2017–
- Employer: Fuji Television
- Website: Fuji Television Yuka Ebihara

Yuka Ebihara (海老原 優香, Ebihara Yuka; born 3 April 1994) is a Fuji Television female announcer.

== Biography ==
Yuka was born in Tokyo. She graduated from Tokyo Gakugei University International Secondary School and Gakushuin University Faculty of Literature, English and American culture.

In April 2017, she joined Fuji Television as an announcer, joining with Koki Adake, Akiko Kuji, and Shoui Kurose.

From October 2017 until March 2018, she served as MC Assistant for Tokudane!

== Personal life ==
Yuka has been interested in international affairs since she was young and has had the experience of studying abroad in three countries.

She received an award at the Model United Nations All-Japan Competition at the time of her third grade high school. During college, she belonged to the "Model United Nations Hiyoshi Study Group," which is active mainly at Keio University, and was mainly studying the agenda items handled by the United Nations Security Council. In high school she belonged to the volleyball club and served as a captain.

== Current appearance programmes ==
- Pro Yakyū News (28 Mar 2021 – present, Fuji TV One)
- FNN Live News α (8 Apr 2022 – present) - Sports anchor

== Former appearances ==
- Downtown Now (9 Jun 2017)
- Flag7 (Houdou Kyoku, 20 Jun – 29 Aug 2017) - Tuesday announcer
- Yoru no Announcer Kenshū (6–30 Jun 2017)
- Tokudane! (CX, 2 Oct 2017 – 30 Mar 2018) - MC Assistant
- Prime News Evening (2 Apr 2018 – 29 Mar 2019) - Co-anchor
- Go! Go! Chuggington (4 Feb 2018 – 5 May 2019) - 6th navigator
- Live News it! (1 Apr 2019 – 25 Sep 2020) - Field reporter
- attest ~Weekly Golf News~ (5 Oct 2020 – 28 Mar 2022, BS Fuji)
