= Masters W75 shot put world record progression =

Masters W75 shot put world record progression is the progression of world record improvements of the shot put W75 division of Masters athletics. Records must be set in properly conducted, official competitions under the standing IAAF rules unless modified by World Masters Athletics. The W75 division consists of female athletes who have reached the age of 75 but have not yet reached the age of 80, so exactly from their 75th birthday to the day before their 80th birthday. Since 2010, the W75 division throws a 2 kg implement. Prior to that, the division threw a 3 kg implement, so both progressions are included here.

Key

Incomplete information Pending Indoor mark before 2000, not acceptable for record better indoor records

== 2.0 Kg Shot Put ==
| Distance | Athlete | Nationality | Birthdate | Location | Date |
|---|---|---|---|---|---|
| 12.29 | Marianne Maier | Austria | 25 December 1942 | Götzis | 5 September 2020 |
| 12.12 | Marianne Maier | Austria | 25 December 1942 | Málaga | 4 September 2018 |
| 11.39 i | Anne Chatrine Rühlow | Germany | 30 September 1936 | Erfurt | 3 March 2012 |
| 11.10 | Evaun Williams | United Kingdom | 19 December 1937 | Porto Alegre | 18 October 2013 |
| 10.35 | Rosemary Chrimes | United Kingdom | 19 May 1933 | Cardiff | 3 July 2010 |

== 3.0 Kg Shot Put ==
| Distance | Athlete | Nationality | Birthdate | Location | Date |
|---|---|---|---|---|---|
| 9.12 i | Rosemary Chrimes | United Kingdom | 19.05.1933 | Lee Valley | 27.03.2010 |
| 8.93 | Galina Kovalenskaya | Russia | 24.09.1934 | Sydney | 11.10.2009 |
| 8.88 i | Susanne Wissinger | Germany | 07.02.1934 | Stadtallendorf | 10.02.2009 |
| 8.40 | Heather Doherty | Australia | 21.07.1933 | Gold Coast | 01.11.2008 |
| 8.11 | Marianne Hamm | Germany | 02.10.1927 | Büdelsdorf | 23.08.2003 |
| 8.02 i | Edith Mendyka | United States | 12.12.1910 | Reno | 19.01.1986 |
| 7.96 | Jean Brubaker | United States | 01.05.1927 | Norfolk | 28.05.2003 |
| 7.95 | Hilja Bakhoff | Estonia | 23.12.1926 | | 2002 |
| 7.91 | Anny Binder | Germany | 13.04.1915 | Pforzheim | 05.06.1992 |
| 7.80 | Irja Sarnama | Finland | 27.09.1905 | Brighton | 22.08.1984 |
