= Lovin' U =

Single by melody.

from the album Ready to Go!
- B-side: "Our Journey, Feel the Rush"
- Released: November 8, 2006 (Japan)
- Recorded: 2006
- Genre: J-Pop
- Length: 18:14
- Label: Toy's Factory

Melody. singles chronology
| "See You..." (2006) | "Lovin' U" (2006) | "Finding My Road" (2007) |

"Lovin' U" is the eighth single by melody. under the Toy's Factory label released November 8, 2006. The single stayed on the Oricon Singles Chart for 4 weeks and peaked at number 16. To date, the single has sold 15,434 copies.

== Track listing ==
1. Lovin' U (4:33)
2. Our Journey (4:26)
3. Feel the Rush (4:29)
4. Feel the Rush (Junkie XL Remix) (4:46)
