= Lei Aloha =

Studio album by melody.
- Released: April 9, 2008 (Japan)
- Recorded: 2007–2008
- Genre: J-Pop
- Label: Toy's Factory

Melody. chronology
Ready to Go! (2006)	Lei Aloha (2008)	The Best of melody.: Timeline (2008)

Singles from Lei Aloha
- 1. "Haruka: Haruka" Released: February 13, 2008

Lei Aloha is the fourth album released by melody. It contains 1 single track "Haruka: Haruka" and 13 brand new songs. Unlike her other albums, there is no CD + DVD edition of Lei Aloha available.

In a blog entry on February 25, 2008, melody. stated that the theme of the album is "bonds" and it reflects who she was before she moved from Hawaii to Japan, as well as the people and things in her life that she can't live without. On her MySpace, melody. made a blog entry on March 15, 2008 and indicated that the photoshoot for the album took place in January in Hawaii. The album reached the #20 spot on the Billboard Japan Top Albums Chart one week after its release.

This album is also her last original album with Toy's Factory. Her next release was a 'best of' collection.

== Track listing ==
1. Daybreak
2. Say Hello
3. Haruka (Eternal Version) (遥花～はるか～; Eternal Flower)
4. Peace Song
5. Never Goodbye
6. Memories in Time
7. Horizon
8. Kiss Away
9. Anata no Soba ni (あなたのそばに; By Your Side)
10. No Return
11. Sunset Love
12. Beneath My Skin
13. Door
14. Paradise

== Oricon chart positions ==
Daily	Weekly	Sales
12	15	20,609
