= Melody (Japanese singer) =

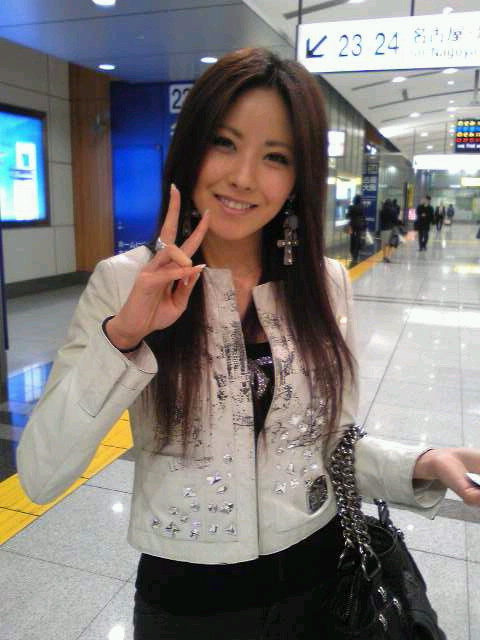
- Melody in March 2008

Background information
- Also known as: Melody Ishihara
- Born: Melody Ishikawa; February 24, 1982 (age 44); Honolulu, Hawaii, U.S.
- Genre: J-pop
- Occupations: Singer; television host; fashion designer
- Instrument: Vocals
- Years active: 2003–2008 (singer); 2023–present (fashion designer)
- Label: Toy's Factory
- Spouse: Miyavi (m. 2009)

Melody Ishikawa (born February 24, 1982), known mononymously as Melody, stylized as melody., is a Japanese-American singer and fashion designer. She debuted in February 2003 with the song "Dreamin' Away", under Toy's Factory. In October 2008, Melody announced on her blog ending her career as a music artist to focus on pursuing a career as a fashion designer.

== Biography ==
Melody was born to Japanese parents in Honolulu, Hawaii. When she was young, she would occasionally watch shows that involved J-pop, and she has also listed Celine Dion, TLC, and Destiny's Child as inspirations. She took ballet and piano, as well as vocal training. When she was 16, she worked as a Hawaiian model for Japanese commercials. While she was a high school student at Punahou, she had a secret audition with record producer Tetsuya Komuro, who was forming an international unit, but when they wanted her to join the next day, she negotiated to wait until she graduated. At the age of 19, she moved to Japan to pursue a singing career. After some time with Komuro's company, where she was allocated to various groups in development, she eventually left and signed with Toy's Factory.

Her debut song, "Dreamin' Away", was released in February 2003 where it peaked at number 33 on the Oricon weekly charts and stayed charted for eight weeks. In June, she released the single "Simple as That" along with a cover of "Over The Rainbow" from The Wizard of Oz; the latter was used in a commercial for Mitsubishi Motors. The single reached number 19 on Oricon. In October, she was a featured artist along with Ryohei in m-flo's song "Miss You", which reached number eight on Oricon.

She is also known for singing the single "Realize" which was the theme song for a TV drama series called Dragon Zakura, which debuted sixth on the Oricon charts. Her single "Lovin' U" was used in a Raycious commercial in 2006. The single included "Our Journey", which was the theme song for the 2006 movie Gen Yu Den starring Rena Tanaka, who also co-wrote the lyrics to the song. Melody made an appearance in a Japanese Subaru Forester commercial in 2007, in which her single "Finding My Road", was used as promotion. In April 2007, she started hosting the English-language Japanese music show J-Melo on NHK World TV. Her single, "Love Story", written by her sister Christine (KURIS), was used in the drama series Kodoku no Kake – Itoshikihito Yo in the summer of 2007.

She was cast as Yumi in the Electronic Arts video game Need for Speed Carbon. The song "Feel the Rush", which was remixed by Junkie XL, was also used in the game.

Her fourth album Lei Aloha was released on April 9, 2008 and had one preceding single, "Haruka: Haruka". In September 2008 was announced that Melody would no longer be the host of J-Melo. Japanese singers May J. and Shanti would take her place. On October 8, 2008, Melody released her first compilation album The Best of melody. ~Timeline~. On October 22, she announced on her blog that she would be retiring as a J-pop singer in January 2009 and would be pursuing a career in fashion design.

In 2012, she announced a children's music project Gold Belle, with sister Christine Saimo. She found it difficult to teach her kids English while living in Japan so they put together the project to give children a fun way to learn. Saimo produced the music and they released the album Kid's Melodies in December 19, under their own record label, EverDream.

== Personal life ==
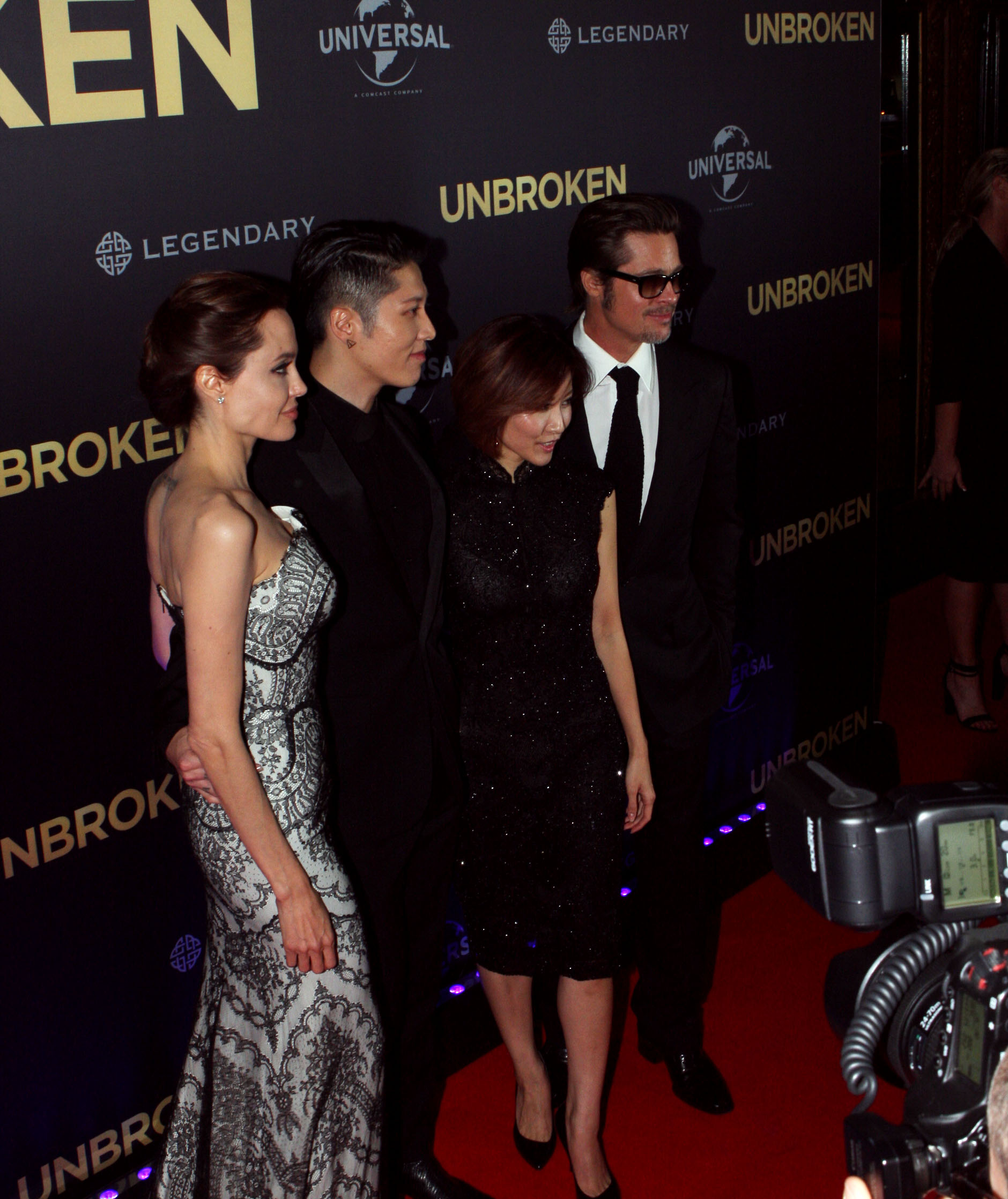
Melody with her husband Miyavi, Angelina Jolie and Brad Pitt at the premiere of Unbroken

Melody has three sisters named Christine, Harmony, and Rhythmy. On March 14, 2009, Melody married Japanese singer and actor Miyavi. The couple has three children, Lovelie "Aily" (born July 29, 2009, in Japan), Jewelie Aoi (born October 21, 2010, in Japan), and Skyler Kakeru (born February 24, 2021, in the United States). From 2014 to 2021, Melody and her family were living in Los Angeles, California, having moved to the area during the release of Miyavi's film Unbroken. After the birth of her son Skyler, she and her family returned to Tokyo, Japan. In March 2025, they moved to Seoul, South Korea.

== Discography ==
=== Studio albums ===
- 2004: Sincerely
- 2006: Be as One
- 2007: Ready to Go!
- 2008: Lei Aloha

=== Compilation albums ===
- 2008: The Best of melody.: Timeline
