= Synchronized =

Synchronized may refer to:

- Synchronization (US) or synchronisation (UK), the coordination of events to operate a system in unison
- Synchronized (album), a 2002 album by Sheavy
- Synchronised (horse) (2003–2012), a racehorse
- synchronized, a programming reserved word that subjects a block of code to mutual exclusion, for thread safety
- Synchronized trampoline, an event in trampoline gymnastics

== See also ==
- Synchronic (disambiguation)
- Synchronizer (disambiguation)
- Synchronization (disambiguation)
- Synchrony (disambiguation)
