= Synchronism =

Synchronism may refer to:

- Synchronism (Davidovsky), compositions by Argentine-American composer Mario Davidovsky incorporating acoustic instruments and electroacoustic sounds
- Chronological synchronism, an event that links two chronologies such as historical and datable astronomical events
- Synchronization, the coordination of events to operate a system in unison

== Film ==
- Synchronized sound, film sound technologically coupled to image
- Post-synchronization, the process of re-recording dialogue after the filming process

== See also ==
- Synchromism an early 20th-century art movement, commonly misspelled as "synchronism"
- Synchronicity (disambiguation)
- Synchronizer (disambiguation)
- Synchrony (disambiguation)
