= I-Doser =

Application for audio content playback

- Developer: Nick Ashton
- Stable release: 5
- Operating system: Windows, Mac OS X, iOS, Android
- Type: Binaural beats
- License: Proprietary
- Website: i-doser.com

I-Doser is an application for the playback of proprietary audio content. The developer claims the separately purchasable content aims to simulate specific mental states through the use of binaural beats, some of it is named after various recreational drugs. The I-Doser player has been downloaded millions of times and is based on the audio technology of a GPL-licensed binaural beat generator, SBaGen. The player can be downloaded for free, and includes some sample audio content. Additional audio content can be purchased.

== Marketing ==
I-Doser tracks are usually 30–40 minutes long and administered with a program called I-Doser. The file format containing the encoded sounds ends in .drg which only the I-Doser program can run. Most doses are priced in the US $1.99–3.99. There are a small number of premium experimental doses costing more. Some are marketed as intended for relaxation, others to simulate substances and others for mind/mental improvement, like the title Brain+, or 3 called Alpha, Beta, and Theta to target those parts of the brainwaves. There are also mobile applications available for iOS and Android with an extensive in-app store for additional doses. MP3 can also be purchased.

The I-Doser .drg files are a derivation of the open source SBaGen file format.

== Evaluation of claims ==
Research into the neurological technology behind I-Doser is sparse. Peer-reviewed studies exist suggesting that some specific binaural beat mixes can affect aspects of mental performance and mood, act as analgesic supplements or affect perceptions, but there have been no formal studies of any effects of mixes particular to I-Doser. Researchers from Oregon Health and Science University interviewed about I-Doser have expressed skepticism over its scientific basis, citing a four-person controlled study of binaural beats that demonstrated no evidence of brainwave entrainment. Other universities have also stated skepticism.
