= Victoria Leong =

Researcher

Victoria Leong is a developmental cognitive neuroscientist whose research into the neural synchrony between mothers and infants has been widely reported. Leong's PhD thesis won the Robert J. Glushko Prize of the Cognitive Science Society in 2014 "in recognition of outstanding cross-disciplinary work integrating neuroscience, psychology, linguistics and computational modelling." She has a dual appointment at Nanyang Technological University and the University of Cambridge and is head of the Baby-LINC Lab at the Department of Psychology at Cambridge. She is a recipient of the 2020 Social Science and Humanities Research Fellowship by the Social Science Research Council.
