= Bennie K =

Japanese musical group

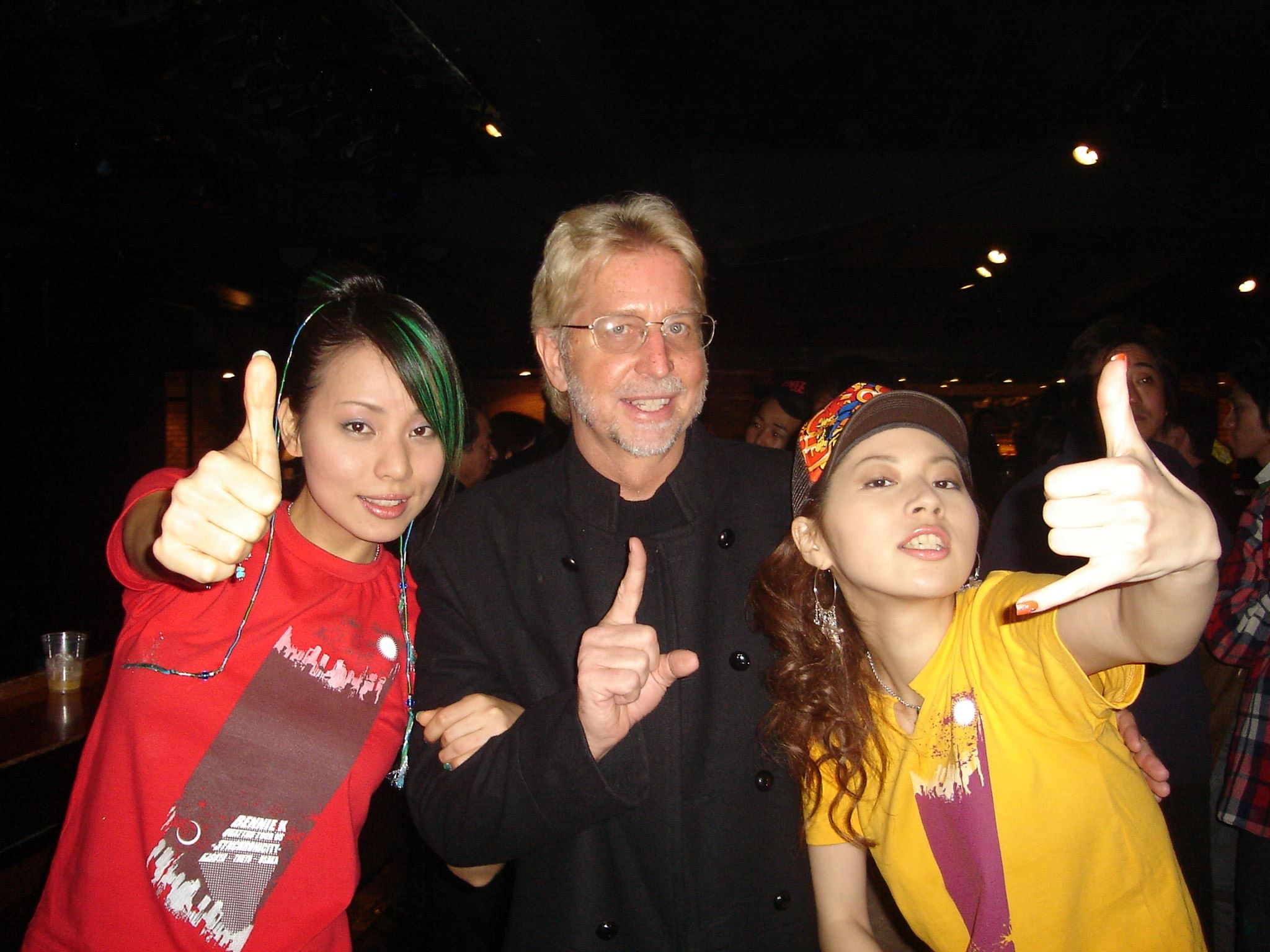
- Cico (left) and Yuki (right) with Kamasami Kong

Background information
- Origin: Japan
- Genres: Urban; J-pop
- Years active: 1999–2022
- Label: For Life Music
- Members: Yuki; Cico; DJ Hi-Kick
- Website: benniek.jp

Bennie K was an urban contemporary music female duo formed in 1999 that consists of vocalist Yuki and rapper Cico. They met while Yuki was in Los Angeles undergoing voice training with Roger Burnley. They made their debut in January 2001 with the single "Melody," released on the For Life Music label.

Bennie K's 8th single "Sunrise" reached the top 10 of the Oricon singles chart in 2004, and their 9th single "Dreamland" reached #2 in 2005. Their 4th album "Japana-rhythm" debuted at #1 on the Oricon albums chart.

Bennie K's songs usually combine Japanese and English. Their sound is primarily urban, but they often use a variety of diverse musical styles, including Latin and country.

== Members ==
=== Yuki (ユキ) ===
- Full Name: Yamamoto Yukiyo (山本ゆきよ)
- Birthday: 2.23.84

Yuki was born in Osaka Prefecture, but grew up in Kashima (鹿島市), Saga Prefecture, located in Japan's Kyūshū region. She has a brother who is 4 years older than she is. Yuki is a graduate of Kashima City's westside public junior high school. At the age of 14, Yuki successfully passed an audition as her graduation date approached. She subsequently did not appear at her junior high school graduation ceremony so that she could go over to America. While living in Los Angeles, California, she went back and forth between attending a local prep school, formal voice training, and dance lessons.

=== Cico (チコ) ===
- Full Name: Yamamoto Chieko (山本知恵子)
- Birthday: 1.7.78

Cico grew up in Suita (吹田市), Osaka Prefecture, located in Japan's Kansai region. She has an older brother and sister. Her alma mater was Osaka Kunei Senior High School. At one time, she was enrolled in Ritsumeikan University’s college of international relations, but dropped out mid-semester. Cico eventually went over to Los Angeles to begin producing rap and hip-hop.

=== DJ Hi-Kick (ハイキック) ===
Hi-Kick is Bennie K’s manager and DJ. His hometown is in Nagano Prefecture, located in Japan’s Chūbu region. He graduated from Tokai University.

== History ==
=== Formation ===
During the summer of 1999, Yuki and Cico had a chance encounter. Yuki was on a homestay in Los Angeles, and her residence was that of Cico’s aunt. While sharing the same quarters, the two became friends. Returning to Japan separately, they continued their musical endeavors. Not too long after, they had the opportunity to collaborate at a Christmas event, and decided afterward to unite and devote themselves to music.

=== Name origins ===
In the new year after deciding to work together, Yuki and Cico went to Kyōto (京都) and prayed for future success at the Fushimi Inari Taisha (伏見稲荷大社), a shrine famous for Inari, a god of business and harvest. On their way back, they came across the Gojō Bridge, recalling it as the site of a famous Japanese legend — the battle between Benkei (弁慶) and Ushiwakamaru (牛若丸). The powerful Japanese warrior monk Benkei is said to have posted himself at this bridge, fighting and winning consecutive duels with 999 passing swordsmen. His 1,000th duel was with Ushiwakamaru and did not end in Benkei’s favor. Benkei joined Ushiwakamaru as a retainer.

=== BK Project ===
Following the release of "The "Bestest" Bennie K Show," Bennie K went off the radar for many months. On 8.19.09, Yuki and Cico updated the official Bennie K website, announcing that they would be starting a new venture called BK Project. The duo apologized for their delay in dispelling any rumors about their absence that may have stirred up anxiety in fans. Yuki has decided to put her singing on hold — and will shift to the role of producer — desiring to take on a greater goal of supporting other amateur and professional musicians. Yuki and Cico both recognize that they have received a great deal of help from other artists over the years — which greatly contributed to their successes — and feel that now is the time to show their gratitude by giving back to the music community. They will be working with American singer Becca for their first production under the project — a single entitled "Dreamer" that will be released under the name Bennie Becca on 11.4.09.

In late 2021, Bennie K announced their disbandment and released their final single "Finale" on December 1, 2021. On their official site they stated that their official date of disbandment will be January 24, 2022.

== Discography ==
=== Studio albums ===
- [2002.07.24] Cube – #235
- [2003.11.05] Essence – #124
- [2004.11.04] Synchronicity – #5
- [2005.11.09] Japana-rhythm – #1
- [2007.05.23] The World – #3

=== Mini-albums ===
- [2004.05.08] The Bennie K Show (ザ･ベニーケー･ショウ) – #48
- [2006.08.02] The Bennie K Show: On the Floor Hen (ザ・ベニーケー・ショウ: On the Floor編) – #5

=== Best albums ===
- [2008.04.23] Best of the Bestest – #1 (Billboard Japan); #2 (Oricon)
- [2008.10.29] The "Bestest" Bennie K Show

=== Singles ===
- [2001.01.24] "Melody"
- [2001.05.23] "School Girl"
- [2001.10.31] "Sunshine"
- [2002.04.24] "Nai / P-Dad"
- [2003.03.05] "My Way"
- [2003.07.23] "Better Days"
- [2003.10.22] "Tegami / Nagori Natsu" (手紙 / なごり夏; Letter / Traces of Summer)
- [2004.09.22] "Sunrise" (サンライズ) – #10
- [2005.06.08] "Dreamland" – #2
- [2005.09.21] "Sky" – #9
- [2006.11.08] "Joy Trip" – #5
- [2007.03.07] "1001Nights" – #17
- [2008.02.20] "Monochrome" (モノクローム) – #9
- [2008.09.03] "Music Traveler / with SOFFet"
- [2021.12.01] "Finale"

=== BK project singles ===
- [2009.11.04] Bennie Becca – "Dreamer"

=== BK project albums ===
- [2010.4.09] Bennie Becca – Bennie Becca

=== Collaborations and other works ===
- [2004.12.15] 2Backka feat. Bennie K – "Orugooru Tokei" (オルゴール時計; Orgel Clock) (found on 2Backka indie album Turn)
- [2005.08.24] M-Flo Loves Bennie K – "Taste Your Stuff" (found on M-Flo studio album Beat Space Nine)
- [2005.10.12] Seamo with Bennie K – "A Love Story" (found on Seamo single "A Love Story" and studio album Get Back on Stage)
- [2005.11.02] M-Flo Loves Bennie K – "Taste Your Stuff" (Happy Drive) (Remix by Kevin Blechdom) (found on M-Flo remix album Dope Space Nine)
- [2007.10.24] 2Backka + Bennie K – "Home" (found on 2Backka single "Home" and studio album Touch)
- [2009.04.29] 2Backka + DJ Hi-Kick – "Orugooru Tokei" feat. Bennie K '09 Remix (オルゴール時計; Orgel Clock) (found on compilation album Sparks)

=== DVD ===
- [2006.05.10] Trippin' Channel: Live Japana-Rhythm
- [2006.09.06] The Bennie K Show: On the Floor Hen? (ザ・ベニーケー・ショウ: On the Floor編?)
- [2007.11.07] The "New" World: World Tour!? in Japan
