= Synchronicity (disambiguation) =

Synchronicity is a concept first introduced by analytical psychologist Carl G. Jung "to describe circumstances that appear meaningfully related yet lack a causal connection."

Synchronicity may also refer to:

== Albums and songs ==
- Synchronicity (The Police album), 1983
  - "Synchronicity I", a 1983 song by The Police from the Synchronicity album
  - "Synchronicity II", a 1983 song and single by The Police from the Synchronicity album
- Synchronicity (Bennie K album), 2004
- Synchronicity (Olivia Lufkin album), 2000
- "Synchronicity" (Yui Makino song), 2007
- "Synchronicity" (Nogizaka46 song), 2018

== Other ==
- Synchronicity (book), a 1960 book about synchronicity by Carl Jung
- Synchronicity (film), a 2015 American science fiction film
- "Synchronicity" (Grimm), an episode of Grimm
- "Synchronicity" (Wire in the Blood), a 2005 television episode
- Synchronicity (Rock Festival, IIT Kanpur), India
- Sinchronicity, a BBC TV drama

== See also ==
- Synchronic (disambiguation)
- Synchrony (disambiguation)
- Synchronism (disambiguation)
- Synchronizer (disambiguation)
- Synchronization, the coordination of events to operate a system in unison
  - Synchronization (computer science)
  - Synchronization (alternating current)
