= Dreamland (Bennie K song) =

Song recorded by Japanese music duo Bennie K

Single by Bennie K

from the album Japana-rhythm
- Released: June 8, 2005
- Genre: Pop-rap
- Length: 4:12
- Label: For Life Music
- Songwriters: Bennie K; Mine-Chang

Bennie K singles chronology
"Sunrise" (2004)	"Dreamland" (2005)	"Sky" (2005)

Audio sample
- "Dreamland": file; help

"Dreamland" is a Japanese-language song recorded by Japanese music duo Bennie K. It was released through For Life Music on June 8, 2005. The song was used in commercials for Coca-Cola, for which it was specifically written, starting in March 2005. It quickly gained in popularity, prompting Bennie K's management to be flooded with inquiries about a potential release date. Due to overwhelming fan demand and attention from the general public, Yuki and Cico reworked the song and released it as the lead single to their fourth studio album Japana-rhythm. The single became Bennie K's most successful single, with multiformat sales of 3 million units.

== Chart performance ==
"Dreamland" debuted at number 2 on the Oricon Singles Chart with 112,000 copies sold, behind Orange Range's "Onegai! Señorita". It slid down to number 3 the following week where it stayed for three consecutive weeks, bringing its four-week total to just short of the 250,000 mark. The single spent three more weeks within the top ten, before falling off the top twenty a week later. "Dreamland" charted for twenty-five weeks on the Oricon Singles Chart, selling a reported total of 349,000 copies during its run. The single ranked at number 18 on the year-end chart and peaked at number 4 on the monthly chart, where it stayed for two straight months.

== Track listing ==
All lyrics are written by Bennie K.

No.	Title	Music	Length
1.	"Dreamland"	Bennie K; Mine-Chang	4:12
2.	"Unity"	Bennie K; Mine-Chang	5;49
3.	"Tabibito" (旅人, "Traveller")	Bennie K; Hammer	4:37
Total length:			14:38

== Charts ==
Chart (2005)	Peak position
Japan Weekly Singles (Oricon)	2
Japan Monthly Singles (Oricon)	4
Japan Yearly Singles (Oricon)	18

== Certifications ==
Region	Certification	Certified units/sales
Japan (RIAJ)	Platinum	250,000^{^}
Japan (RIAJ) Full-length ringtone	2× Platinum	500,000^{*}
Japan (RIAJ) Ringtone	2× Million	2,000,000^{*}
^{*} Sales figures based on certification alone.^{^} Shipments figures based on certification alone.

== See also ==
- List of best-selling singles in Japan
