= Skip Beat! =

Japanese manga series and its franchise

- Cover of the first manga volume, featuring Kyoko Mogami

スキップ・ビート! (Sukippu Bīto!)
- Genre: Comedy, coming-of-age, romance
- Manga
- Written by: Yoshiki Nakamura
- Published by: Hakusensha
- English publisher: NA: Viz Media
- Magazine: Hana to Yume
- Original run: February 15, 2002 – present
- Volumes: 53
- Anime television series
- Directed by: Kiyoko Sayama
- Produced by: Shinji Horikiri; Kōsuke Suzuki; Hiroto Kumagai
- Written by: Mayori Sekijima
- Music by: Akifumi Tada
- Studio: Hal Film Maker
- Licensed by: AUS: Hanabee; NA: Pied Piper; UK: MVM Films
- Original network: TXN (TV Tokyo)
- Original run: October 5, 2008 – March 29, 2009
- Episodes: 25
- Other
- Skip Beat! TV drama series
- icon

Skip Beat! (Japanese: スキップ・ビート!, Hepburn: Sukippu Bīto!), abbreviated as Sukibi, is a Japanese shōjo manga by Yoshiki Nakamura. It is the story of Kyoko Mogami (最上 キョーコ, Mogami Kyōko), a 16-year-old girl who discovers that her childhood friend and romantic goal, Shotaro Fuwa, only keeps her around to act as a maid and to earn his living expenses, while he works his way to become the top pop idol in Japan. Furious and heartbroken, she vows revenge by beating him in show business.

In Japan, the manga was first published in Hakusensha's shōjo manga magazine Hana to Yume in February 2002, while in the United States, it began publishing under Viz Media's Shojo Beat label in 2006. Fifty-three volumes and one fanbook have been released in Japan, and fifty-one of the volumes have been released in the United States. In 2002, a drama CD adaptation was made and released by Marine Entertainment and covers the first volume (chapters one to five) of the manga. An anime adaptation was produced by Hal Film Maker and began airing on October 5, 2008. It ended airing with episode twenty-five on July 12, 2009.

== Plot ==
Skip Beat! follows the story of Kyoko Mogami, a sixteen-year-old girl (seventeen by volume 20) who loves her childhood friend, Shotaro Fuwa, but is betrayed by him. Having spent a large part of her childhood at Shotaro's parents' inn, she learned a great deal about hostelry and other such jobs. Shotaro, not wishing to take over his parents' business, asks Kyoko to run away with him to Tokyo, leaving high school and her life in Kyoto Prefecture behind to help him pursue a music career. Upon arrival in Tokyo, Kyoko lives an unreasonably frugal life and works multiple jobs to support Sho, as he is called by his fans, spending nothing on herself and doing whatever she can for Sho, who eventually becomes ranked seventh of the top twenty most popular male celebrities of Japan. One day, she overhears Shotaro complaining about her to his manager, saying that she is a boring and plain girl who he thinks of as a doormat. He proceeds to sweet-talk and flirt with his manager, in stark contrast to the cold and demanding attitude he usually exhibits towards Kyoko.

As she storms away, Kyoko doesn't shed many tears when she learns that Sho wanted her along only to handle housekeeping duties. Instead, her "Pandora's box" opens and she vows vengeance on Sho. As she is carried away by security, Sho mockingly tells her that if she wants revenge, she had better become a bigger star than he is. And so, Kyoko changes her appearance and enters the entertainment industry, facing many challenges along the way.

After this introduction, Skip Beat! follows Kyoko's journey climbing up the showbiz ladder at first to gain her revenge but later out of her love of acting. Along the way, Kyoko meets many interesting people, troublemakers, foes, and friends alike, as she develops both as a person and as an actress. Additionally, she begins to regain the sense of compassion and other tender emotions that she lost when her heart was broken by Sho (Shotaro). Once she enters show biz Kyoko meets Ren Tsuruga, who at first disapproves of Kyoko for such a silly reason to begin acting, a profession he holds semi-sacred. As Kyoko cultivates her acting and friendships, she soon discovers a sense of self separate from her initial plans for revenge.

== Media ==
=== Manga ===
Skip Beat! began as a manga series written and illustrated by Yoshiki Nakamura which started serialized in Hakusensha's shōjo manga magazine Hana to Yume on February 15, 2002. The first bound volume was released in Japan on July 19, 2002, and fifty-three volumes have been released to date. The manga was licensed by Viz Media for release in English in North America on Viz Media's Shojo Beat imprint. The first volume was released in English on July 5, 2006. As of 4 March 2025, fifty volumes were released in English. Furthermore, Viz Media has also re-released Skip Beat! as 3-In-1 omnibus editions since December 1, 2020 Sixteen volumes have been released, the latest combining volumes 46–48.

As of January 2021, the manga has sold more than 14 million copies in Japan.

=== Drama CD ===
In total, eight drama CDs have been released as of April 2021.

The first, titled Skip Beat! Drama CD, was released by Marine Entertainment bearing the catalog number "MMCC-7029" on September 26, 2002. It covers the first volume (chapters one to five) of the manga.

The second, titled BLACK Drama CD, was released on August 21, 2012, and focuses on the Dark Breath arc. The BLACK Drama CD features the voice actors for the anime, with the addition of Yuki Kaida as Jelly Woods in the BLACK Drama CD

The third, titled KISS×KISS Drama CD Valentine Weapon, was released on January 19, 2013, and covers Shou's kiss and Ren's cheek kiss on Valentine's Day. KISS×KISS Drama CD Valentine Weapon like the BLACK Drama CD feature the voice actors for the anime.

The fourth, titled DARK BREATH, Drama CD was released in March 2017. It covers the Cain and Setsuka Heel love bite scene in chapters 194 through 196.

A fifth adaptation featuring Kyouko's reunion with Corn in Guam was bundled with the first printing of the 40th volume as a limited-edition release, on sale March 20, 2017, with Marina Inoue and Katsuyuki Konishi reprising their respective roles.

On September 20, 2019, two more drama CDs were released. One drama CD was included in a limited edition of the 44th volume; it adapts the "Kitchen Words" short story. The other CD came with an issue of Hana to Yume and adapted the short stories "Otherworld With Love" and "Until You Sleep."

Another drama adaption was released with a January 2021 issue of Hana to Yume, covering the manga chapters 274 through 279.

=== Anime ===
The anime adaptation was directed by Kiyoko Sayama and animated by Hal Film Maker, it began airing in Japan on October 5, 2008, and ended on March 29, 2009. The first opening theme is "Dream Star" by the generous. The first ending theme is "Namida" by 2BACKKA. The second opening theme is "Renaissance" by the generous, and the second ending theme is "Eien" by Yūsaku Kiyama. Anime streaming website Crunchyroll also officially streams the anime online with English subtitles through an agreement with TV Tokyo.

Pied Piper licensed the series and launched a Kickstarter campaign to fund the series on DVD and Blu-ray with an English dub. The Kickstarter campaign was successful, meeting the goal and the stretch goal needed to produce the Blu-ray release.

=== Live-action adaptation ===
In 2008, a Taiwanese drama of Skip Beat! was announced in a press conference in Japan, titled (Chinese: 華麗的挑戰; pinyin: Huá Lì De Tiǎo Zhàn) or Extravagant Challenge in English, starring Ivy Chen as Kyōko, Choi Siwon as Tsuruga Ren, and Lee Donghae as Shō Fuwa. It was to be directed by Niu Cheng Ze (鈕承澤) and produced by Gala Television (GTV). A few days before shooting was due to begin, in January 2009, Lai Cong Bi (賴聰筆), Deputy General Manager of GTV stated that the production had been postponed indefinitely due to factors such as restructuring of the joint venture company in Japan and script re-write.

In March 2011, it was announced that the project would resume filming in April 2011 with the leading role of Gong Xi (Kyōko) played by Ivy Chen, Dun He Lian (Tsuruga Ren) played by Choi Siwon, and Bu Puo Shang (Shō Fuwa) played by Lee Donghae of Korean boy band Super Junior.

The series aired from December 18, 2011, to April 1, 2012, with a total of 15 episodes. The live-action adaptation also aired in Japan, China, Thailand, Singapore, Malaysia, Indonesia, and the Philippines. Each episode ran about an hour long and stuck very closely to the plot line of the manga, albeit with some comedic elements added in. Given its ending (much like the anime, it left loose ends, although it still managed to get further along in the plot) and the many fans the series acquired, there has been speculation as to whether there will be a season two; many believe the producers are waiting for the manga to finish to provide a proper ending.

=== Video game ===
A video game was released on May 28, 2009, for the PlayStation 2.

The opening song of this game is "Blow Wind" by SMILY☆SPIKY. The game takes place after the animation of Skip Beat! where the main character, Kyoko Mogami, needs to choose her next job and develop her relationships with others. The game is imported from Japan and has yet to be translated into English. Although the game is a continuation of the manga it does not follow the plot specifically.

=== Novelization ===
An original story Kitchen★Wars (きっちん★うぉ～ず！？, Kitchin★Wōzu!?), written by Ayuna Fujisaki, appeared in Hana to Yume Bunkei Shōjo, vol. 2. The literary adaptation centered on Kyōko's guest appearance in a cooking show and used art from the manga as an illustration.

A second story, Fairy Tale♥Ride (メルヘン♥ライド, Meruhen♥Raido), appeared in The Hana to Yume released on April 25, 2015. Also written by Ayuna Fujisaki, it centered on a Love Me job for Kyōko and Kanae at a theme park.

A third story, From the Otherworld With Love (あの世から愛をこめて, Ano Yo kara Ai o Komete), appeared in The Hana to Yume released on July 25, 2015. Written by Ayuna Fujisaki, the story has Kyōko possessed by a ghost, and features Shō, Reino, and Ren.

A fourth story, Yukihito Yashiro's Illness Diary (社倖人の闘病日記, Yashiro Yukihito no Tōbyōnikki), appeared in The Hana to Yume released on October 25, 2015. Also written by Ayuna Fujisaki, the story features Ren's manager on a day off due to a cold.

Ayuna Fujisaki has written a fifth story featuring Kyōko working as Bō the Chicken, which appeared in The Hana to Yume released on January 25, 2016.

On September 20, 2016, the five short stories were published in a collection that includes another original Skip Beat! short story by Ayuna Fujisaki as well as original art by Yoshiki Nakamura.
