= Tokyo Crazy Paradise =

Japanese manga series

- Cover of the first manga volume

東京クレイジーパラダイス
- Manga
- Written by: Yoshiki Nakamura
- Published by: Hakusensha
- Magazine: Hana to Yume
- Original run: 1996 – 2002
- Volumes: 19

Tokyo Crazy Paradise (東京クレイジーパラダイス, Tōkyō Kureijī Paradaisu) is a shōjo manga series by Yoshiki Nakamura. It takes place in Tokyo, Japan, in the year 2020, revolving around the lives of fourteen-year-old Tsukasa Kozuki as she acts as bodyguard for her classmate, Ryuji Shirogami, who is the third generation boss of the yakuza group, Kuryugumi.

== Plot ==
It's the year 2020 AD. Tokyo which is a futuristic society, complete with flying skateboards, laser guns and a variety of advanced technology. It is also a city infested with crime with far fewer women than men, with a subsequently higher amount of violence against women. It is also an example of moral decay; the series opens with a girl being attacked in broad daylight with people apathetically passing by, remarking that she should take care of herself.

Not wanting their daughter to suffer the same fate, Tsukasa Kozuki's cop parents raise and teach her to live as a boy. While Tsukasa's parents investigate the murder of her classmate's, Ryuji Shirogami's, father, who is the leader of the powerful Kuryugumi yakuza group, they are both killed in one of the yakuza's in-fights. The deaths leave both Tsukasa and Ryuji orphans, with Ryuji succeeding the group as their third generation boss, known as the Sandaime, and Tsukasa on the streets with her three brothers.

With no other options left, she goes to Ryuji whom she has known for eight years with hopes for shelter. After catching their parents' killer, Tsukasa becomes indebted to Ryuji when her brothers eat a veritable fortune on his tab and he uses the opportunity to tie her into becoming his personal bodyguard until her debt is paid off. Intrigued by her, Ryuji keeps slapping on an increasing amount of debt onto Tsukasa using all manners of ploys necessary to keep the reluctant Tsukasa by his side.

The story mainly centers on the developing romance and relationship between Tsukasa and Ryuji, which has a vast array of difficulties. Tsukasa has dreams of becoming a police officer like her parents, which conflicts with Ryuji's position as the boss of the largest syndicate in the Kantō area of Japan. At the same time, Kuryugumi, as an extremely powerful yakuza group, has many conflicts and gang wars with other groups, making up the rest of the story's conflict.

== Characters ==
=== Main characters ===
Tsukasa Kozuki (紅月 司, Kōzuki Tsukasa)
Tsukasa is the only daughter of two police officers. Upon their deaths in investigating the death of the second Kuryugumi boss, she becomes involved with the next boss of Kuryugumi, Ryuji, who has been her classmate for the past eight years. She was raised as a boy because her mother saw too many women as victims at crime scenes and wanted to shield her from the excessive sexual and violent mistreatment of women. As the child of two cops, she despises corruption and cruelty and wants to be a cop herself one day.
She has an extremely happy and bright personality and thinks that the world is a crazy place, but that she can do her part to make it better. She was trained to fight by her parents and subsequently, at the start of the story, is already an excellent fighter and is rarely defeated in a fight. (She fights with a chain whip that ends in a handle that can alternately be extended into a blade.) Incidentally, she also hates the yakuza, citing them at fault for many of the wrongs of the world.
Although Tsukasa dresses up as a boy for most of the story (she has a chest protector that flattens out her breasts), she is actually a very attractive female with a tall and excellent figure. Hence, whenever she dresses in female clothes and wigs (which she calls it "cross-dressing", since she thinks of herself as a man), she looks much more mature and is often the subject of catcalling and other sexual overtures. Despite this, she is completely clueless of other people's romantic interest towards her, especially with Ryuji. She is also blind to the feelings she develops for him, often confusing her for most of the story.
Tsukasa and Ryuji have attended school together since kindergarten. When she was eleven years old, Tsukasa slipped on a river bank and fell in. Due to hiding as a boy, she never attended swimming classes and nearly drowns. Ryuji, who was watching her from the bridge, quickly jumped in and saved her and performed CPR on her, therefore discovering that she's actually female. Ryuji is thus aware of Tsukasa's true gender from the beginning of the story.
Tsukasa has three brothers: her supposedly fraternal twin, Toshiyuki (14), younger brother, Shohei (13), and older brother, Takuma (16).
Tsukasa later found out that she is the adopted daughter of the Kozukis and that she is actually the daughter of Wakasa Ayabe and the yakuza leader of Hougougumi, which after the deaths of Wakasa and her husband consequently fell apart. Wakasa had given her daughter to her friends, the Kozukis, along with the kagi to the drug, shortly after Tsukasa's birth knowing that she was going to die. Tsukasa finds inklings about her true parentage after Ryuji was shot and in the hospital, and having it confirmed by Wakasa's former bodyguard. Since learning her origins and after Ryuji's been shot, she promises him to stay always by his side (thus, she implies on becoming his seisai).
Ryuji Shirogami (白神 竜二, Shirogami Ryūji)
As the Sandaime – third generation leader – of the Kuryugumi group, he has been raised with the constant goal of succeeding. He rarely shows his emotions on his face and, as long as Tsukasa can remember, has been an excessively gloomy and sober child. Though not obsessive about exacting justice in the way Tsukasa is, he has his own moral code and holds himself to high standards of behavior if not society's.
Though Tsukasa is his bodyguard, she has wondered why he needs one as he is excellently skilled in karate, kendo, judo, aikido, and kyūdō. He is additionally always well-armed (he fought Shiva, Tsukasa's true uncle who had his memories imprinted on a core and survived death, with a knife embedded in his watch) and an excellent fighter, though Tsukasa generally fights the most central battles in the story.
His mother died giving birth to him and he was given over to Toshiyuki Kamojima, a lower-ranked yakuza whose pregnant girlfriend had recently been murdered, to be raised. While his own father did love him, he felt that distance was necessary in raising the next-generation leader and generally kept away from Ryuji in his formative years, leaving Kamojima as his father-figure.
Ryuji is intelligent, cynical, manipulative and in some respects very Machiavellian. However, he is very loyal and does what he can to be kind to the people he cares about, though that is a very short list. Alternately, he is not at all hampered by Tsukasa's naïveté and is fully aware of his attraction towards her from the beginning of the story. He feels relaxed around Tsukasa, she is the only person he has allowed to see him sleeping, and his bodyguard comments to Tsukasa that around her, Ryuji actually looks and appears his young age. He enjoys tormenting and teasing Tsukasa, but under all the teasing does truly care for her to a large extent. It is shown that she is literally the only person who can make him smile and lively in life. It is also revealed that he has had a crush on Tsukasa since elementary school, but was initially disturbed by his feelings when believing her to be a boy until discovering her true gender, much to his relief. Later in the story, after Kamo-san was killed by one of the Ultimate weapons, Tsukasa confronts him, saying that he doesn't need to hide his true emotions in front of her. He then gives into his grief and begins to weep and Tsukasa embraces and comforts him.
Despite his relationship with Tsukasa, Ryuji is engaged to Asago Sumon, the daughter of one of his lower bosses, who has essentially been raised for the role of being his wife. While Ryuji cares for Asago, who is genuinely in love with him, it is in the way that a brother cares for a sister, which Asago does not fully realize until much later. He cares for Asago so much that he always try to protect her from danger; he even takes a bullet, which almost costs him his life, during a dispute with another gang in order to save her. His engagement to her is to prevent clan conflict since the clans under Kuryugumi all accept Asago as an appropriate candidate. Despite his engagement to Asago, it doesn't stop Ryuji whatsoever from pursuing Tsukasa, causing great tension among the three. At the end, he manages to cancel the engagement with Asago and his relationship with Tsukasa becomes stronger.

=== Kuryugumi ===
Kuryūgumi (九竜組; lit. The Sociation of Nine Dragons)

Tatsuya Shirogami (白神 龍弥, Shirogami Tatsuya; Kuryūgumi no Nidaime)
Ryuji's late father known by his title Nidaime (the second generation) who was killed by Odawara. He was admired much by Kamo-san and Ryuji developed his almost identical look. He made a promise with Kaya regarding her sister, that Ryuji went on to fulfill in his own time, and took personal interest in Kamo-san's intent on getting revenge. He had given Ryuji to Kamo-san after he was released from the hospital, giving him the name 'Ryuji'; the name Kamo-san was planning to give to his own son. His name and Ryuuji's have the kanji for 'dragon' (龍) in them (Ryū in Ryūji and Tatsu in Tatsuya).

Ayane Shirogami (白神 綾音, Shirogami Ayane)
She is Ryuji's late mother and was Tatsuya's seisai. Her existence is finally mentioned in ep. 85. It is left assumed that she died while giving birth to Ryuji.
Toshiyuki Kamojima (鴨島 俊之, Kamojima Toshiyuki; Kamo-san, Kamocchi (42))

One of Ryuji's main associates and bodyguards. Kamo-san is the older of the two and has served Nidaime, Ryuji's father as well. He probably knows Ryuji the best out of all the Kuryugumi members and is usually seen with a smile on his face. He would very much like to see Tsukasa and Ryuji get together, knowing how happy the two make each other, and that Tsukasa would make an excellent seisai for Ryuji. Hence, he is determined to find ways to get the two closer to each other romantically, often making observations of the two's interactions with each other and helping them navigate through their growing and often complicated feelings, and to finally admit their feelings for one another. He is a father-like figure to Ryuji, since he had raised him since he was a baby and sees him as his own son. When he dies during the great gang war, his final request is for Tsukasa to look after Ryuji. When younger, he went on a killing spree because Hanawa killed and raped Kamo-san's pregnant wife while recording a video and sell it on the black market.

Yoshiyuki Shibuya (渋谷 良行, Shibuya Yoshiyuki; Bun-san)
Bun-san is more serious compared to Kamo-san. He is more of a brotherly figure contrasted with Kamo-san's fatherly nature. He accepts that Tsukasa is very capable of the position of seisai. He greatly lacks skill at using his gun (according to Tsukasa) and is also Ryuji's main chauffeur. He is shown not to be fond of children. He and Kamo-san are one of the few people who know of Tsukasa's true gender and her ties with Wakasa.
Footgear Guardians (下足番衆, Gesokubanshū)
Mitsugi Shigaraki (信楽 御調, Shigaraki Mitsugi; Age 20) and Shinji Muko (向日 真道, Mukō Shinji; Age 20), The two younger members of Kuryugumi who get into trouble often. Shigaraki has light coloured hair and has his left ear pierced a couple of times while Muko has dark coloured hair mostly swept back. The both of them do not get along well with each other, even when teamed up, and both shared a dislike towards Tsukasa at first. Mitsugi and Shinji were disowned by their parents before finishing elementary school and were passed around to different relatives before simply becoming runaways at the age of 13. They were picked off the street by Ryuji two years prior to the story and are very loyal to Ryuji.
Yui
She was in a relationship with Kamo-san 14 years prior to the story and the two were deeply in love. She was pregnant with his child, a son, and planned on naming him Ryuji. However, she is soon raped and killed by Hanawa, the kumicho of Hanawagumi. She had made a promise with Kamo-san to keep smiling. When Kamo-san is killed and departs from the living world, the two happily reunite in the after life.
Meiko (命子)
Doctor of Kuryugumi's private hospital (inside Kuryugumi's main house). She was ordered by Ryuji to find out how Paramelt works and to "cure" Tsukasa. She was concerned about Tsukasa's decision to continue staying like a boy despite being aware of Tsukasa and Ryuji's mutual feelings towards each other. She tries to convince Tsukasa to act more like a female, much to little success. She enjoys teasing both Ryuji and Tsukasa, especially about the relationship between them.

=== Silver Dragon Clan ===
Ginryūkai (銀竜会; lit. Association of Silver Dragons)

Sumon (守門)
Asago's father, and head of the Silver Dragon Clan. He raised Asago strictly so that she would become the perfect seisai candidate and expects a lot from her, often fearing he will be shamed by her actions. He was shot by a sniper, but has since recovered. He has a wife who has been given very little information. He appears to be more timid than the other clan heads, highly kumi oriented, and very strict in the upbringing of Kuryugumi's main lady. After Ryuji is shot, he refused to allow Asago back in his house, saying that she is no longer a Sumon. While he used to shower Asago with sarcastic remarks, he abruptly stopped after a single comment from Ryuji.
Asago Sumon (守門 朝来, Sumon Asago; Age: 14)
In the beginning of the story, she was introduced as Ryuji's fiancee (seisai, literally translated as the good/right/holy wife). She was aiming to be like Durga, a legendary female figure whom she admires, who acts as her husband's right hand, although has little success in doing so. She is the only daughter of Sumon, the head of the Silver Dragon Clan and the head clan under Kuryugumi. Asago is very jealous that Ryuji spends most his time with Tsukasa and not her, even when under the impression that Tsukasa is a boy. She is quick to show her temper and is reluctant to trust Tsukasa as she is a katagi (a child of a cop/law-abiding citizen). Like Ryuji, she's can use a gun well and can use two at once, although not initially good at it. She doesn't seem to truly trust anyone except Ryuji.
In the beginning, Asago believes that Tsukasa is male until later realizing that, much to her dismay, Tsukasa is actually a girl. After seeing the attraction between the two, she was willing to do anything to prevent Ryuji and Tsukasa from being together, even threatening Tsukasa's brothers lives and shooting one of them in the leg as a warning to keep her distance from him. During a fight between Karyugumi and other gangs, she loses her left arm and she's quite worried of her unstable status. After Ryuji protected Asago from being shot, nearly killing him, she began living in guilt and even contemplated suicide, but changed her mind after meeting Munakata, a cop, and even began to regret her actions towards Tsukasa. Eventually, she accepts that Tsukasa is the only one who Ryuji can truly be comfortable with. She eventually shows some feelings towards the scarred cop and later confesses her feelings to him at the hospital after the great gang war, which he returns. Her father tries to break the two up, due to Munakata being a cop, but she refuses to give in since he truly makes her happy.

=== Gold Dragon Clan ===
Konryūkai (金竜会; lit. Association of Gold Dragons)

Hiroto Shibata (新発田 弘人, Shibata Hiroto)
Oyabun of the Gold Dragon Clan under Kuryugumi. He has short curly dark hair, and is very greedy. He let out the kumi's secret about the Inverted Cross and lured customers away from the Silver Dragon Clan's business by passing out the illegal weapons. Like his daughter, he carries a gun, but is not very good. (He had missed shooting Tsukasa even in a close range shot.) He wanted to be promoted to become leader of the head clan.
Azumi Shibata (新発田 安澄, Shibata Azumi; Age 18)
Daughter of Shibata Hiroto, oyabun of the Gold Dragon clan under Kuryugumi. She looks like a female version of Ryuji with long wavy light colored hair and large breasts with a large ego. She fell in love with Ryuji at first sight, although she's much older than he is. This caused her to challenge Asago in her position as Durga. She can handle a gun, but not very well. She loves to show off her wealth and her body, glares a lot and treats other people especially those "inferior" to her as scum.
Odawara (尾田原)

The person who betrayed Kuryugumi and killed the Nidaime. He was later kept alive, but living a life worse than death, according to what Ryuji told him.

Fujioka (藤岡)

A good friend of Kamo-san, who knew him since they were younger. He is also one of the people who knew Yui and Kamo-san's relationship and that Yui and their unborn baby were killed. Later, he was there with Kamo-san when he died.

=== Purple Dragon Clan ===
Shiryūkai (紫竜会; lit. Association of Purple Dragons)

Kyuragi (厳木, Kyūragi)
The oyabun of the Purple Dragon Clan. One of the evil quartet, and often speaks on their behalf. He has a daughter who was raised to be a possible seisai, the one who spoke out at the recent executive meeting. He appears to be power hungry and always seems to be picking on Asago and always gets beat up by Tsukasa. He never thought he'd listen to any of Tsukasa's orders, but in the battle against the Ultimate Weapons, he found himself doing just that.
Hitomi Kyuragi (厳木 瞳, Kyūragi Hitomi; Age 13)
The daughter of the Purple Dragon Clan's Kyuragi. She has short light coloured hair, false large [inflatable] breasts, and is madly in love with Ryuji, but was rejected. She is shown to be conniving and sneaky and was the one who injected Asago with a drug that paralyzed her left arm temporarily. She is pretty good with a gun and wants to be the kage no seisai. She almost made Tsukasa misunderstand that she saw Ryuji's sleeping face, when Tsukasa was initially happy believing that she was the only one who saw his sleeping face. However, it turned out that she drugged him with sleeping pills, which caused him to fall asleep for three days straight. She is genetically modified to become a female, just to be his seisai. She is also the reason that Tsukasa came to realize that she loves Ryuji differently from how she loves Akira.

=== White Dragon Clan ===
Byakuryūkai (白竜会; lit. Association of White Dragons)

Usui (碓井)
The oyabun of the White Dragon Clan and one of the evil quartet, who opposed to Asago being the seisai. Has a daughter who was raised to be a possible seisai.
Mamiko Usui (碓井 真美子, Usui Mamiko)
The daughter of the White Dragon Clan's Usui. She seems to be the youngest out of the "evil quartet's" daughters. She has long wavy hair, and the biggest eyes out of the four girls while the shortest of them who are trying to become the ura no seisai. She is younger than Ryuji.

=== Red Dragon Clan ===
Akaryūkai (赤竜会; lit. Association of Red Dragons)

Kawazoe (川副)
The oyabun of the Red Dragon Clan. He is one of the evil quartet. The guy with the major receding hairline and has a daughter who was raised to be a possible seisai.
Kumi Kawazoe (川副 紅美, Kawazoe Kumi)
A daughter of the Red Dragon Clan's Kawazoe. She long straight dark hair and looks the most evil of the "evil quartet's" daughters. She appears to be around eighteen.

=== Green Dragon Clan ===
Rokuryūkai (緑竜会; lit. Association of Green Dragons)

Mooka (真岡, Mōka)
The oyabun of the Green Dragon Clan. One of the evil quartet, who recommended that Asago have a bodyguard.
Misuzu Mooka (真岡 美鈴, Mōka Misuzu)
Daughter of the Green Dragon Clan's Mooka with long brown wavy hair and the tallest of the four girls. Possibly, she is the oldest of the girls.

=== Blue Dragon Clan ===
Jōryūkai (青竜会; lit. Association of Blue Dragons)

=== The Kōzuki Family ===
Ikumi Kozuki (紅月 育美, Kōzuki Ikumi)
The mother of the four Kozukis and the one who decided to raise Tsukasa as a boy rather than as a girl. Also a member of the police special task force GRAVE. She was killed while investigating Hizakigumi. She possibly has orange hair and was entrusted a deep secret of Garyukai. She seems to have had contact with Wakasa and a strong sense of justice. She raised Tsukasa to be strong.
Yutaka Kozuki (紅月 豊, Kōzuki Yutaka)
The father of the four Kozukis and the person that Kise Akira admired. He was a member of the police special task force known as GRAVE that dealt with the rising crime. He was killed while chasing Hizakigumi while off duty, a few days after Ryuji's father was killed. He was the one who trained Tsukasa when she was little. He also had a strong sense of justice and was the inventor of Tsuaksa's protector. He knew Ayabe Wakasa and even called her "Waka-chan".
Shohei Kozuki (紅月 昭平, Kōzuki Shōhei; Sho, Age 13)
Tsukasa's youngest brother who is known as cutest and probably the most spoiled. He too wouldn't mind seeing his sister getting together with Ryuji. He also works as a host of a gay bar. He light coloured hair and does not plan on abandoning Tsukasa, even if she was not related to him by blood.
Toshiyuki Kozuki (紅月 季之, Kōzuki Toshiyuki; Toshi, Age 14)
Tsukasa's apparent twin brother, although in the first story, he was introduced as Sho's twin. He's the younger twin and has no problem with Tsukasa getting along with Sandaime. Like his other brothers, he works as a host of a gay bar. He has medium dark hair. Even after learning he is not related to his sister by blood, he continues to care very much for her.
Takuma Kozuki (紅月 詫間, Kōzuki Takuma; Taku-nii, Age 16)
Tsukasa's older brother. Unlike his other brothers, he doesn't approve of his sister forming any form of connection with Ryuji. He dropped out of school to help with his family's expenditure and works as a dealer at a casino. He is very reliable and is family-oriented. He is a friend of Onda and highly recommends Akira as a boyfriend to Tsukasa. He knows a deep dark secret about Garyukai and is trying to prevent Tsukasa from being involved with them. He will forever act as big brother towards Tsukasa even if they're not blood relatives.
Kaya Shozu (生水 加悦, Shōzu Kaya)
The woman who lives with the Kozuki brothers. She lost her parents since childhood, and her younger sister left her some time ago, due to a martial arts competition where she was killed. When the will to live left her, Tatsuya (Kuryugumi's Nidaime) has saved her. She hates fighting and often tries to discourage Tsukasa from fighting, much to little effect.

=== Police Officers ===
Akira Kise (紀勢 全, Kise Akira)
A cop who kept appearing whenever the police were called. He admired Tsukasa's father, Kozuki Yutaka, and decided to become a police officer after meeting with him. He's really tall, muscular, unbelievably strong, funny and honest. He hates the yakuza, especially Kuryugumi, who he thinks is responsible for Kozuki Yutaka's death. He seems to have a bit of a sad past, as he was abandoned by his parents. He got to be a member of the GRAVE section of the Control Police after catching the person involved in the bombing at New Heaven Tokio. He is Munakata's partner. He is also one of the few people who knows that Tsukasa is female and has an interest in her, even though he's much older (24). He views Ryuji as a rival for her affection.
Kai Munakata (宗像 嵬, Munakata Kai)
A member of the GRAVE section of the control police and is Akira's partner, after the latter joined GRAVE. He is usually cool and calm and has a scar that runs down the right side of his face. He appears to have a tendency to become as violent as the criminal he catches. He has to be stopped from killing the criminal according to other colleagues. When he changes to his "violent" side, all colleagues stay clear of him in fear, and consider it to be his partner's (Akira) job to stop him. Despite his violent side, he has a very sweet side to him. He also claims that he lives only to protect women and is known to use his police cruiser as a mobile hotel. He's the same age as Akira, but looks like an oyaji according to Asago. He has a soft spot for Asago. He happens to be Nakamura's (the author's) favorite character.
Tomioka (冨丘)
A female cop who took Akira as a date to New Heaven Tokio. She has light colored hair up in a ponytail. She has a strong sense for justice, very direct and can be short tempered at times. A good friend of Akira. Currently, she is a member of GRAVE, likely promoted the same time Akira was. She is last seen in the scene before Akira decides to take Tsukasa as his date to Tokonome Island. She also is aware of the fact that Tsukasa is actually female.

=== Hogougumi ===
Hogōgumi (宝豪組)

Wakasa Ayabe (綾部 若桜, Ayabe Wakasa; Kage no Seisai (陰の聖妻, lit. Shadow Concubine))
The legendary shadow seisai to the currently disbanded Hogougumi. She looks like a more mature version of Tsukasa with long dark hair. Not much is known about her except that she took the fighting half of the weak omote no seisai to the Hogougumi kumicho. She was very good at fighting, either weaponless or with a katana. She was the origin for the title of Durga. Despite being rumored to have had no physical contact with her 'husband', she pledged complete loyalty to him. However, it was found out that she slept with Hogou's kumicho, fell pregnant and had a baby girl (who is later revealed to be Tsukasa). It was later found out further that she only slept with him because he said that is the only way he can get over her, but Shiva misunderstood and thought she loved Sou. She was abandoned by Hogougumi when it was threatened by Garyukai over 14 years ago according to Shiki. She went out to kill Mikaido Shiva, according to Azuma. She entrusted the kagi, or the key to Garyukai's top secret, to the Kozuki family. She went to kill Shiva due to her love for him and wanted to die together with him at the same time.
{Omote no seisai}
The 'real' wife to Hogougumi's kumicho and mother to Shiki. She was the visible wife of the kumi, and was unable to fight. However, she was rumored to be the motherly figure for the kumi. She was good friends with Wakasa, and even persuaded Wakasa to continue on with her pregnancy (leading to Tsukasa's birth). She is presumed dead. She had long, wavy light colored hair.
So Mikaido (御海道 草, Mikaidō Sō)
The kumicho to Hogougumi and father to Shiki and Tsukasa. He had two seisais, a visible one and an invisible one. He has short dark hair and a younger brother known as Shiva. He is also presumed dead.

=== Garyūkai ===
Shiva Mikaido (御海道 シバ, Mikaidō Shiba)
He was killed by Wakasa for betraying Hogougumi, yet appears in Misumi's body. Due to a brain core operation, he is able to live in someone else's body. It is shown in the story that he has a strong interest for Tsukasa because she looks exactly like her mother whom he had feelings for. Even though he's biologically Tsukasa's uncle (since he's Sou's younger brother), there is a time when he marks her neck. He has a long flowing black hair, when in Misumi's body. He has quite a sad past, and he stated that Wakasa was the only one who looked at him rather than past him, unlike the others around him, who only paid attention to his older brother. He had a weak constitution and thought of his brother as a rival. He is in love with Wakasa, and was devastated when she had sex with his brother, believing that she loved his brother. He returned Misumi's body to Shiki after watching Wakasa's video, which was left to Tsukasa, and decided to return to the time when Wakasa killed him, so that he can die together with her.
Kahry (カーリー, Kārī)
The artificial panther-like creature that has been created for the purpose of searching for Wakasa's related DNA. It was first seen when Tsukasa was on the trip with her classmates after their exam. When she saw it, she noticed the eyes lit up red, and got scared. It was later found out that the eyes lit up red when it sensed Wakasa's blood nearby. When Shiva was almost shot by Oguro, Kahry protected him by taking the bullet. Despite being shot, it did not die since it is not a real panther. Shiva lets him stay by Tsukasa in the end to protect her, much to Shiki's surprise, as he commented that he never let it out of his sight because Kahry was created to look like Wakasa. In the last few chapters of the manga, Kahry was shown to be really playful with Tsukasa, sensing her presence when she reaches Kuryugumi and ends up wrestling with her until Tsukasa is tired.
Shiki Mikaido (御海道 志揮, Mikaidō Shiki; Scorpion)
One of the sole survivors of Hogougumi. He is the only son of Sou and the omote no seisai, making him Tsukasa's biological half brother – even if he says he hates her, they truly act like siblings. During the battle between Garyukai and Hogougumi, he was seen as a child hidden inside a box, found by a member of Garyukai. Shiki has a deep hatred for Wakasa because he believes that she had abandoned him and the gumi. The first time he shows up is when he harasses a woman into taking drugs and gets a major beating from Tsukasa who happened to be passing by at the time.
Freya
The most powerful 'ultimate weapon' of the drug. She plays a big role to the story because she is the reason why Tsukasa got found out as a girl by Kuryugumi in volume 17. She fought and killed the 'ordinary' gokudos very quickly, and saved the handsome ones for her playing. At the time, it was Akira, Tsukasa, and Ryuji. However, being angry when she was deceived by Tsukasa, Tsukasa ended up going one on one with her, knocking Akira unconscious, and he tried to protect her. She stopped Ryuji and the other members of Kuryugumi, those who were still living since they were not in the first batch of people with Ryuji, from participating in the fight, and can only watch as Tsukasa practically fights with a single dagger. During the fight, they described it as a great imitation of the Goddess of fighting, Durga. She also killed many of the police, and severely injured Munakata. She later dies during a fight with Tsukasa.
Oguro (奥黒, Ōguro)

An aura and face that clearly states "The Bad Guy". The only reason he wants the kagi (the key to opening the door to the plant that a drug Garyukai seeks is stemmed from) is to 'rule the world' because he is the only one with the 'right to do so'. His reasons for ruling the world or his background is unknown. Freya gets depressed because he was in charge of her and because he was "very ugly". He's later arrested by the police.

Sakaki (榊)

Not much is known about him other than the fact that he resurrected Shiva in Misumi's body and he also wanted the key to rule the world. He's later murdered by Shiva while disputing over the key. He also might have been a brain core user.

Misumi Soryo (総領 深角, Sōryō Misumi)

Not much is known about him other than the fact that Shiva is using his body due to the brain core operation, and Shiki is very protective of his body, not wanting any part of him to get damaged. The main reason is that Misumi took care of Shiki as a child after the disbandment of Horougumi. His body is also the only reason why Shiki remained with Shiva, so as to get his body back from Shiva.

== Reception ==
The manga has been analyzed for the way it portrays female power and agency within the yakuza world. For example, East Asian Studies scholar Erik Ropers comments that the author "Nakamura can be seen to argue for and make a case for young women to question and challenge existing societal expectations and gender roles." At the same time, Ropers notes that the manga and drama also downplays the illegality of the criminal activities engaged in by the organization and does not address issues of the abuse of women within such organizations.

== Volumes ==
1. ISBN 4-592-12861-3 published in December 1996
2. ISBN 4-592-12862-1 published in March 1997
3. ISBN 4-592-12863-X published in June 1997
4. ISBN 4-592-12864-8 published in October 1997
5. ISBN 4-592-12865-6 published in January 1998
6. ISBN 4-592-12866-4 published in May 1998
7. ISBN 4-592-12867-2 published in August 1998
8. ISBN 4-592-12868-0 published in December 1998
9. ISBN 4-592-12869-9 published in March 1999
10. ISBN 4-592-12870-2 published in July 1999
11. ISBN 4-592-17611-1 published in October 1999
12. ISBN 4-592-17612-X published in January 2000
13. ISBN 4-592-17613-8 published in May 2000
14. ISBN 4-592-17614-6 published in September 2000
15. ISBN 4-592-17615-4 published in January 2001
16. ISBN 4-592-17616-2 published in May 2001
17. ISBN 4-592-17617-0 published in August 2001
18. ISBN 4-592-17618-9 published in November 2001
19. ISBN 4-592-17619-7 published in April 2002
