= Eikichi Yazawa =

Japanese singer (born 1949)

Eikichi Yazawa 矢沢 永吉
- Born: September 14, 1949 (age 77)
- Origin: Hiroshima, Hiroshima Prefecture, Japan
- Genre: Rock
- Instruments: Vocals; bass guitar; guitar
- Years active: 1972–present
- Label: Garuru (his indie label)
- Website: www.eikichiyazawa.com

Eikichi Yazawa (矢沢 永吉, Yazawa Eikichi; born September 14, 1949) is a Japanese singer and songwriter. He is the father of singer-songwriter Yoko Yazawa. He has been nicknamed as "Ei-chan" (永ちゃん), "Boss" and "The King of Rock".

== Biography ==
=== 1949–1967: Early life in Hiroshima ===
Yazawa was born in Hiroshima, on September 14, 1949. His father was a bicycle shop owner but died of radiation sickness when Eikichi was in the 2nd grade of elementary school. His mother had disappeared, leaving her husband and son behind when Eikichi was 3 years old. He was mainly raised by his paternal grandmother in poverty until he graduated high school. Being bullied in school, such as having a cake thrown at his face, he started to think and practice his philosophy of "being big" which allowed him to survive the poverty and the bullying. When he was in junior high school, he listened to music such as The Ventures and The Beatles, which led him to a career as a rock musician. He started to learn the guitar, and on New Year's Day of 1968, he composed his first song, “I Love You, OK”.

=== 1968–1975: Yokohama and Carol ===
In 1968, three weeks after he graduated from high school, Yazawa left Hiroshima by train to Tokyo. On the way, he experienced pain from sitting too long and decided to get off and start living in Yokohama.

Making ends meet by working a few jobs, he formed several bands: The Base, E-Set and Yamato. All of these bands mainly played in the clubs of Yokohama. But after the breakup of Yamato, Japanese musical trends switched to folk music, which led to several clubs closing one after another.

In early 1972, he started recruiting members for a new band by placing notices in music stores. With new members, Johnny Okura (side guitar and side vocals) and Toshikatsu Uchiumi (lead guitar), he formed the band Carol. Yazawa was the lead vocalist and bassist of the group. The band received wide recognition after their appearance on the October 1 episode of "Live Young!" on Fuji TV. After seeing their performance on the program, Mickey Curtis helped produce their debut single "Louisiana" on December 20 of the same year. Mickey also introduced them to a drummer, You Okazaki, who later become a member of the band.

Carol's style was deeply influenced by The Beatles, especially when they were based in Liverpool. With their motorcycle jackets, pompadour hairstyles, and early rock 'n' roll style numbers, along with their cover versions of "Johnny B. Goode" and "You've Really Got a Hold on Me", the band gained notable popularity and greatly influenced Japanese popular music. Their biggest hit "Funky Monkey Baby" released on June 25, 1973 and became a standard of Japanese rock music.

Carol broke up in 1975 after their infamous final concert in Hibiya Open-Air Concert Hall, Tokyo. After the last song "Last Chance" was played, firecrackers accidentally exploded and burned down the stage. In the history of this traditional hall, the event is referred to as the biggest "Hibiya Legend".

=== 1975–1980: Solo debut and Gold Rush ===
In May 1975, Yazawa flew to the U.S. to start his solo career after signing with CBS Sony. His debut solo album, I Love You, OK, was recorded at the A&M Studios in Los Angeles and produced by The Godfather soundtrack producer, Tom Mack. Because Yazawa switched his style of music, I Love You, OK got generally unfavorable reviews. His first solo concert tour, ‘Around Japan Part-1, sold poorly. At the concert at Sasebo Civic Hall in Sasebo, Nagasaki, which held over 1,000 people, only 200 tickets were sold. After the poorly attended concert, Yazawa claims to have made an oath to himself to “Remember Sasebo”. He continued to tour around the country to show that Carol's former leader was now a solo artist.

On July 24, 1976, under the name “The Star in Hibiya”, he returned to Hibiya Open-Air Concert Hall to a sold-out audience and a new album, A Day. On his “33000 Miles Road” tour of Japan, Yazawa played 66 concerts and steadily gained popularity.

After the remarkable success of his third album, Open Your Heart, Yazawa played his first solo performance at Nippon Budokan on August 26, 1977, to a sold-out crowd of over 13,000 people. His live album, Super Live Nippon Budokan, which contains most of these concert, was then released three months after the show.

1978 is regarded as one of the biggest years of Yazawa's career. Not only did his 4th album, Goldrush, which was later rated No. 5 on list of the “100 Greatest Japanese Rock Albums of All Time" of Rolling Stone Japan, go to #1 in the Oricon charts. His autobiography Nari-Agari, edited by video game designer and writer Shigesato Itoi, sold over a million copies. On August 28, he performed a concert in Korakuen Stadium in front of a crowd of 50,000 people. He also ranked 1st of top-earning musicians by Japanese government, beating the Enka queen Hibari Misora. The following year, he performed at 96 venues, including Nagoya Stadium.

Despite his success, he described experiencing an “emptiness” in spite of his success. In 1980, Yazawa signed a contract with Warner Pioneer (now Warner Music Japan) and moved to the West Coast of the United States.

=== 1981–1987: Career in the United States, performing with the Doobie Brothers ===
Yazawa moved to Los Angeles and started to find musicians to record his new album. In 1981, he released his first English album, Yazawa. The album was produced by Bobby LaKind of the Doobie Brothers, and Paul Barrere of Little Feat. The musicians included John McFee, Patrick Simmons, Keith Knudsen, Cornelius Bumpus, Willie Weeks, Richard Hayward, Kenny Gradney, and Mark Jordan. He also released the album Rising Sun for the Japanese market.

In 1982, he released the single “Rockin’ My Heart” and his second English album, Yazawa It's Just Rock'n'Roll, produced by Bobby and John McFee. “Rockin’ My Heart” was recommended by Billboard magazine in its February 19, 1983 issue. He also released the album P.M.9 for the Japanese market. In September, he began his ‘P.M.9 1982 E.Yazawa’ Concert Tour with John McFee, Richie Zito, Dennis Belfield, Keith Knudsen, Mark Jordan, and Bobby LaKind. This tour included two Budokan concerts. John and Keith would be long term musicians of Yazawa's concerts until 1996.

The next few years included Yazawa releasing an album in Japanese, 1984’s E’, which was the first of his albums produced by Andrew Gold. In 1985, he sang at Live Aid, where his performance of “Take It Time” was broadcast worldwide. During this period, Yazawa's music style could almost be described as AOR, under the influence of his American friends. Unfortunately, Yazawa’s marketing in the U.S. was near non-existent. Distributed through Elektra Records, the label had no obligation to advertise Yazawa’s music. Following this period, he decided to sign with EMI Music Japan and return to Japan. In 1987 he released his last album in English, Flash in Japan (later released in Japan in 1999). During that year’s ‘Rock ‘n’ Roll Knight 2’ tour, bassist George Hawkins joined Yazawa's band and would play with them until 2016.

=== 1988–1999: Media appearances ===
In 1988, Yazawa’s first album on EMI, Kyohansha (Accomplice in English), was released. The album was recorded in London, with British musicians such as Jaz Lochrie, Alan Murphy, Micky Moody, and Jimmy Copley. He played 76 concerts this year, with the last one being his first at the Tokyo Dome. On the 1990 tour Rock ‘n’ Roll Army, Keyboardist Guy Allison joined the band.

Yazawa’s 1991 album, Don’t Wanna Stop, was a new challenge for him. Half of the album was recorded in London by producer George McFarlane, and the other half was produced in L.A. by Andrew Gold.

In 1992, he started to appear in advertising for Suntory's brand-new canned coffee product, Boss. It was a very surprising commercial because he played an unfortunate worker, breaking the impression of rock music charisma. During this period, Yazawa continued to appear in the media. In 1994, he starred in the Japanese drama Ari Yo Saraba (lit. Goodbye, Ants) as a high school biology teacher. In this drama, he sings both the opening theme and the ending theme.

In 1995, Yazawa held a concert tour called ‘Just Tonight’, which included several stadium or dome concerts (Yokohama Stadium, Hankyu Nishinomiya Stadium, Fukuoka Dome). This concert's back-up band (John McFee, Bruce Gowdy, George Hawkins, Keith Knudsen, Guy Allison) is referred to as the best interation of Yazawa’s live band.

In 1996, by recording his new album live in front of his fans. This event, Open Recording Gig, was released on VHS and DVD along with the recorded album, Maria. In 1997, he was invited to ‘Songs and Visions’, a rock festival held in Wembley Stadium, as the special guest and representative of Asia, alongside Rod Stewart, Jon Bon Jovi, Chaka Khan, and Robert Palmer. He sang “Don't Be Cruel” solo, and “Heartbreak Hotel” and “Hey Jude” with other musicians.

In 1998, Yazawa was swindled out of about 3.5 billion yen (approx. $35 million U.S.) for a huge building construction project in Australia. It took him several years to pay off the debt.

He also starred in the film, Ojuken (lit. Entrance Exam) as a corporate-owned marathon runner. On September 15 1999, the day after his 50th birthday, he held an anniversary concert called ‘Tonight the Night!’ in Yokohama International Stadium, keeping the promise he made in his book Nari-Agari. Many people believe that this concert was one of the best performances of his career as well as the best concert in the history of Japanese rock music.

=== 2000–2012: Period of musical challenges ===
In 1999 and 2000, Yazawa performed three concerts each year in the U.S. These were the only concerts held outside of Japan.

In 2002, the 30th anniversary of his debut, Yazawa tried a few new challenges. First, he held his first acoustic tour ‘Voice’ in 22 cities, a change from his normal rock-style concert tour. Second, he performed at Tokyo Stadium for the first time, at his special concert ‘The Day’.

In 2003, he gave an unannounced performance, singing “When You Wish Upon a Star” as part of a Tokyo Disney Sea parade. He also appeared at the domestic rock festival for the first time. In this year's tour, he invited the Czech National Symphony Orchestra to hold Rock Opera, under the concept of a “fusion of rock and classical music”.

In December 2005, Yazawa ran a sold-out Japan tour of “live houses” (Japanese-English for a live-music club) as a part of his “back to roots” approach to his 30th anniversary as a solo artist. ‘Ei-chan’ delighted fans with a rendition of “Whiskey Coke”, a hit from that year (and a Karaoke library mainstay), as well as numbers from his 2005 album, Only One.

The tour of 2006 was a continuance of Rock Opera, called ‘New Standard: Rock Opera 2’. In this tour, with Czech National Symphony Orchestra, he played some orchestrated version of songs, including epic version of his popular ballad, “Tokyo”. He also played jazz version of the songs in the Blue Note Tokyo, a traditional jazz club.

On December 16, 2007, Yazawa performed his 100th concert at Nippon Budokan. In it, he appeared in the same clothes as the first Budokan concert. In addition, he chose “Come on Baby” as the opening number, just like he did at the first Budokan live. John McFee, George Hawkins, and Guy Allison joined as special guests

On September 19, 2009, 5 days after the day of his 60th birthday, he held a concert in Tokyo Dome for the first time in 20 years. Kyosuke Himuro, Hiroto Kōmoto, and Masatoshi Mashima joined as special guests to sing “Kuroku Nuritsubuse” (lit.Fill It With Darkness) with Yazawa.

On September 1, 2012, he held the concert called Blue Sky, in Yokohama International Stadium (now Nissan Stadium) to commemorate his 40th anniversary of his debut. Former Carol guitarist Toshikatsu Uchiumi appeared as a guest to play a few Carol hits, including “Funky Monkey Baby”, and their debut single “Louisiana”.

=== 2013–2021: Holding several Dome concerts, and the coronavirus pandemic ===
From 2013 to 2016, Yazawa reduced the number of concerts on his annual tour. He mainly held concerts in large cities like Tokyo, Osaka, Fukuoka, and Nagoya. He formed the band Z’s with young musicians and held the concerts in more provincial cities such as Miyazaki, Shizuoka, and Akita.

On the Christmas of 2013, he started a dinner show called ‘Dreamer’ at the Grand Hyatt Tokyo. This show was also performed in the Christmas seasons of 2014, 2016, and 2019. The performance on the Christmas Day of 2016 was released on Blu-ray and DVD the following year.

On September 5, 2015, he held ‘Rock in Dome’, his 5th Tokyo Dome concert. The dome was filled with over 50,000 people.

In 2017, he resumed large-scale live tour, Traveling Bus 2017. This tour is named after 1977 concert tour Traveling Bus, which includes 1st Budokan live. This tour’s band including Geoff Dugmore, Jeff Kollman, Guy Allison, and Snake Davis.

In 2018, because he turned 69 (the number 69 can be read as “rock” in Japanese), the tour, ‘Stay Rock’, was held in 5 cities, which included his first concert in Kyocera Dome Osaka. The tour finished at the Tokyo Dome on September 15, 2018 and was aired live on TV.

Two concerts in 2019 tour ‘Rock Must Go On’ were canceled because of Yazawa's throat ache. That was his first time to cancel his concert. He successfully came back on the live in Sendai, and the tour was concluded in Osaka-jō Hall. He planned the extra concerts of this tour in 2020 but canceled due to Coronavirus pandemic. During the pandemic, he distributed three unreleased live on streaming platforms. Yazawa has been back on stage in the autumn of 2021. On the ‘I'm Back!! -Rock is Unstoppable-’ tour, he held 31 concerts in 23 cities, including 4 concerts in Nippon Budokan.

=== 2022–present: Half-century anniversary, "King of Rock" ===
In 2022, the half-century anniversary of his debut, Yazawa continued his activities. In July, the rock festival organized by Yazawa himself was held. On August 27, he started the 50th anniversary stadium and dome tour My Way at the Japan National Stadium. NHK recorded this live rehearsal, calling him the “King of Rock”. That was first concert held in this place with audiences (idol group Arashi taped the concert without audiences in 2020). The tour continued at the Fukuoka Dome on September 17 and at the Kyocera Dome Osaka on September 24.

== Discography ==
=== Singles ===
Sources:

- I Love You, OK (September 21, 1975)
- Mayonaka no Rock n' Roll (真夜中のロックンロール (lit. Rock n' Roll of Midnight)) (March 21, 1976)
- Hikishio (ひき潮 (lit. Ebb Tide)) (September 21, 1976)
- Kuroku Nuritsubuse (黒く塗りつぶせ (lit. Fill It With Darkness)) (June 21, 1977)
- Jikan yo Tomare (時間よ止まれ (lit. Let time stop)) (March 21, 1978)
- I Say Good-Bye, So Good-Bye (April 1, 1979)
- This Is A Song For Coca-Cola (March 10, 1980)
- Namida no Love Letter (涙のラブレター (lit. Love Letter of Tears)) (May 10, 1980)
- Love That Was Lost (抱かれたい、もう一度 (lit. I Want to Hold You, Once More)) (April 25, 1981)
- You (September 25, 1981)
- Yes My Love (February 20, 1982)
- Lahaina (April 10, 1982)
- Rockin' My Heart (October 9, 1982)
- Misty (June 29, 1983)
- Last Christmas Eve (November 16, 1983)
- The Border (March 10, 1984)
- Toubousha (逃亡者 (lit. Runaways)) (July 10, 1984)
- Take It Time (June 25, 1985)
- Believe in Me (May 25, 1986)
- Flash in Japan (May 13, 1987)
- Kyohansha (共犯者 (lit. Accomplice)) (July 6, 1988)
- New Grand Hotel (ニューグランドホテル) (September 21, 1988)
- Kuchizuke ga Tomaranai (くちづけが止まらない (lit. Can't Stop Kissing)) (November 30, 1988)
- Somebody's Night (April 26, 1989)
- Itoshi Kaze (愛しい風 (lit. Lovely Breeze)) (July 19, 1989)
- Ballad yo Eien ni (バラードよ永遠に (lit. Ballad Forever)) (October 11, 1989)
- Pure Gold (May 23, 1990)
- Yume no Kanata (夢の彼方 (lit. Over the Dream)) (April 19, 1991)
- Last Scene (ラスト・シーン) (May 31, 1991)
- Big Beat (December 11, 1991)
- Anytime Woman (June 3, 1992)
- Anytime Woman - English Version - (June 17, 1992)
- Tokyo (東京) (February 10, 1993)
- Tasogare ni Sutete (黄昏に捨てて (lit. Abandon in Twilight)) (October 27, 1993)
- Ari yo Saraba (アリよさらば (lit. Goodbye, Ants)) (April 27, 1994)
- Itsuno Hi ka (いつの日か (lit. Someday)) (May 25, 1994)
- Natsu no Owari (夏の終り (lit. End of the Summer) (February 8, 1995)
- Aozora (青空 (lit. Blue Sky)) (May 24, 1995)
- Maria (May 16, 1996) incl. vocals by Zeeteah Massiah
- Mouhitori no Ore (もうひとりの俺 (lit. Another Myself)) (November 7, 1996)
- Still (September 3, 1997)
- Anohi no Youni (あの日のように (lit. Like that Day)) (November 7, 1997)
- Chinatown (チャイナタウン) (July 29, 1998)
- Oh! Love Sick (June 30, 1999)
- The Truth (August 9, 2000)
- Tonight I Remember (October 25, 2000)
- Senakagoshi no I Love You (背中ごしの I Love You (lit. I Love You Through the Back) (August 29, 2001)
- Kusari wo Hikichigire (鎖を引きちぎれ (lit. Tear the Chains)) (July 26, 2002)
- Only One (August 24, 2005)
- Natsu no Owari (夏の終り (lit. End of the Summer) (September 5, 2007)
- Loser (February 25, 2009)
- Cobalt no Sora (コバルトの空 (lit. Sky of Cobalt Blue) (June 3, 2009)

=== Albums ===
Sources:

- I LOVE YOU, OK (September 21, 1975)
- A Day (June 21, 1976)
- Open Your Heart (ドアを開けろ (lit. Open the Door)) (April 21, 1977)
- Gold Rush (ゴールドラッシュ) (June 1, 1978)
- KISS ME PLEASE (June 21, 1979)
- KAVACH (June 10, 1980)
- YAZAWA (August 5, 1981)
- RISING SUN (October 25, 1981)
- P.M.9 (July 10, 1982)
- YAZAWA (1981)
- It's Just Rock'n Roll (December 4, 1982)
- I am a Model (July 20, 1983)
- E' (July 25, 1984)
- YOKOHAMA Hatachi Mae (YOKOHAMA 二十才まえ (lit. Yokohama, Before the age of 20)) (July 25, 1985)
- TEN YEARS AGO (November 28, 1985)
- Tokyo Night (東京ナイト) (July 25, 1986)
- FLASH IN JAPAN (May 18, 1987)
- Kyohansha (共犯者 (lit. Accomplice)) (July 21, 1988)
- Jyoji (情事 (lit. Love Affair)) (June 21, 1989)
- Eikichi (永吉) (July 31, 1990)
- DON'T WANNA STOP (July 5, 1991)
- Anytime Woman (June 24, 1992)
- HEART (March 31, 1993)
- the Name Is ... (July 6, 1994)
- Somewhere in the Dark (この夜のどこかで (lit. Somewhere in This Night)) (July 5, 1995)
- MARIA (July 3, 1996)
- YES (August 8, 1997)
- SUBWAY EXPRESS (September 8, 1998)
- LOTTA GOOD TIME (August 6, 1999)
- STOP YOUR STEP (September 27, 2000)
- YOU, TOO COOL (September 7, 2001)
- SUBWAY EXPRESS 2 (September 4, 2002)
- Yokogao (横顔 (lit. Profile)) (September 1, 2004)
- ONLY ONE (September 14, 2005)
- Rock 'n' Roll (August 5, 2009)
- Twist (June 9, 2010)
- Only One -touch up- (July 6, 2011)
- Last Song (August 1, 2012)
- Itsuka, Sono Hi ga Kuru Hi made (いつか、その日が来る日まで ... (lit. Until Someday that the Day would come ...)) (September 4, 2019)

=== Live albums ===
Sources:

- THE STAR IN HIBIYA (November 21, 1976)
- Super Live Nippon Budokan (スーパーライブ 日本武道館) (November 21, 1977)
- LIVE Korakuen Stadium (LIVE 後楽園スタジアム) (December 5, 1978)
- The Rock 6.2.1980 NIPPON BUDOKAN LIVE (November 28, 1980)
- 1982 P.M.9 LIVE (March 26, 1983)
- STAND UP!! 5 Years Realive Document (February 15, 1989)
- Anytime Woman LIVE ALBUM (September 30, 1992)
- LIVE! YES, E (April 22, 1998)
- LIVE DECADE 1990 ~ 1999 (March 29, 2000)
- CONCERT TOUR "Z" 2001 (March 30, 2002)
- Live History 2000 ~ 2015 (March 5, 2018)

=== Compilations ===
Sources:

- THE GREAT OF ALL (July 1, 1980)
- THE GREAT OF ALL VOL. 2 (December 1, 1980)
- THE GREAT OF ALL - Special Version - (November 21, 1983)
- THE BORDER (February 15, 1984)
- ROCK'N ROLL (March 25, 1988)
- BALLAD (March 25, 1988)
- THE ORIGINAL (October 31, 1990)
- THE ORIGINAL 2 (December 8, 1993)
- E. Y 70'S (October 1, 1997)
- E. Y 80'S (October 1, 1997)
- E. Y 90'S (October 1, 1997)
- Your Songs 1 (May 17, 2006)
- Your Songs 2 (May 17, 2006)
- Your Songs 3 (May 17, 2006)
- Your Songs 4 (September 26, 2007)
- Your Songs 5 (September 26, 2007)
- Your Songs 6 (September 26, 2007)
- ALL TIME BEST ALBUM (May 15, 2013)
- ALL TIME BEST ALBUM II (July 1, 2015)
- STANDARD ~ THE BALLAD BEST ~ (October 21, 2020)
