= Yoshiki Nakamura =

Japanese manga artist

Yoshiki Nakamura 仲村佳樹
- Born: June 17, 1969 (age 57) Tokushima Prefecture, Japan
- Area: Manga artist
- Notable works: Skip Beat!

Yoshiki Nakamura (仲村佳樹, Nakamura Yoshiki; born June 17, 1969 in Tokushima Prefecture) is a Japanese manga artist. Nakamura made her manga debut with Yume de Auyori Suteki in the manga magazine Hana to Yume in 1993.

== Manga works ==
- Blue Wars
- Can't Give Up the MVP (MVP wa Yuzurenai)
- Skip Beat! 『スキップ・ビート！』
- Tokyo Crazy Paradise 『東京クレイジーパラダイス』
- Yume de Au yori Suteki (Better Than Meeting In A Dream)
- Saint Love (basketball series)
- Dramatic Love Album (oneshot)
