= Yoko Yazawa =

Yoko Yazawa 矢沢 洋子
- Also known as: yoko
- Born: November 12, 1985 (age 40); Tokyo, Japan
- Genres: Pop; Rock
- Instrument: Vocals
- Years active: 2008–present
- Label: Garuru Records
- Formerly of: The Generous
- Website: www.yokoyazawa.com

Yoko Yazawa (矢沢 洋子, Yazawa Yōko) is a Japanese singer-songwriter, formerly the lead vocalist of The Generous. She is Eikichi Yazawa's eldest daughter, and her mother is one quarter American. While she was 12, she went to school in Los Angeles at the Ojai Valley School and Palos Verdes Peninsula High School. In 2010, she made her solo debut with her self-titled album. She is also featured on Joe Inoue's album Dos Angeles as a featured vocalist on the song "Animal"; the two singers originally met in high school in Los Angeles. She is currently the lead vocalist for the group, Piggy Banks, formed in 2014.

== Discography ==
=== Albums ===
- YOKO YAZAWA – August 25, 2010
  1. "H♡NEY BUNNY"
  2. "don't look back"
  3. "crazy for you"
  4. "Eiyū ~HERO~" (英雄～HERO～)
  5. "Gekkō" (月光; "Moonlight")
  6. "fade away"
  7. "high☆tention"
  8. "Aitai" (逢いたい; "Let's Meet")
  9. "SUGAR!SUGAR!!SUGAR!!!"
  10. "Owarinaki Tabiji" (終わりなき旅路; "Never-Ending Journey")
  11. "Let me…"
- Give Me!!! – August 3, 2011
  1. "SOS"
  2. "Adrenaline" (アドレナリン, Adorenarin)
  3. "Natsukaze" (夏風; "Summer Wind")
  4. "Ageha" (アゲハ; "Swallowtail Butterfly")
  5. "Give Me!!!"
  6. "Amanojaku" (アマノジャク; "Heavenly Evil Spirit")
  7. "JOKER"
  8. "hane" ("Wing")
  9. "too late"
  10. "Rashinban" (羅針盤; "Compass")
- "BAD CAT" – November 13, 2013
- "Bad Cat"
- "Spider Web"
- "Don't Get Me Wrong" (cover)
- "Breakaway" (cover)
- "Hope"

=== Singles ===
- "SUGAR!SUGAR!!SUGAR!!!" – August 18, 2010 (iTunes Store exclusive)
- "Rashinban" (羅針盤; "Compass") – May 11, 2011 (iTunes Store exclusive)
- "BAD CAT" – November 13, 2013

== Bad Cat mini album ==
"Bad Cat" was released on November 13, 2013 by Garuru Records. It spawned the Top 40 single, "Bad Cat." The song debuted on the Japan Billboard charts at #59. It then rose to #28, making it Yoko's first Top 40 hit ever. As of November 28, 2013 it remains in the Top 40 at #40.

== Bad Cat single ==
The song debuted on the Japan Billboard charts at #59. It then rose to #28, making it Yoko's first Top 40 hit ever. As of November 28, 2013 it remains in the Top 40 at #40. The song was originally titled, "Hot Mess," but was changed to "Bad Cat" for its Japanese translation.

== Charts ==
Chart (2013)	Position
Japan Billboard Top 40	28
