= The World (Bennie K album) =

Studio album by Bennie K
- Released: May 23, 2007
- Recorded: 2006–2007
- Genre: J-pop, urban
- Label: For Life (FLCF-4180) CD
- Producer: Bennie K

Bennie K chronology
Japana-rhythm (2005)	The World (2007)

The World is Bennie K's fifth album.

== Track listing ==
1. Aru Asa: Opening (ある朝) (Some Morning)
2. Joy Trip
3. Passista de Samba
4. Satisfaction
5. Ei->Futsu->Doi: Interlude (英→仏→独) (Eng->Fr->Ger)
6. Hooligan in the House (風利眼 in the House) _{The Kanjis reading would be: Fuurigan which would be the same als Hooligan}
7. Rararai Lie?! (ララライ Lie?!)
8. 1001 Nights
9. Echo
10. Matador Love
11. Safari
12. Kiro...: Interlude (帰路) (The Way Back)
13. Aoi Tori (青い鳥) (Blue Bird)
14. Around the World: Reprise
15. Waiha (ワイハ) (Hawaii)

== Charts ==
Oricon Sales Chart (Japan)

Chart	Peak position	First week sales	Sales total
Oricon Weekly Charts	3	46,381	46,381
