= Japana-rhythm =

Studio album by Bennie K
- Released: November 9, 2005
- Recorded: 2005
- Genre: J-Pop, Urban
- Label: For Life (FLCF-4180) CD
- Producer: Bennie K

Bennie K chronology
Synchronicity (2004)	Japana-rhythm (2005)	The World (2007)

Japana-rhythm is Bennie K's fourth album.

== Track listing ==
1. Haru: Opening (春: Opening)
2. Utopia (ユートピア)
3. Happy Drive: Taste Your Stuff
4. Unity
5. Natsu: Interlude (夏: Interlude)
6. Dreamland
7. Osaga
8. Puppy Love Pt. 2
9. Aki: Interlude (秋: Interlude)
10. Tabibito (旅人)
11. Sky
12. Moonchild
13. Fuyu: Interlude (冬: Interlude)
14. A Love Story feat. Seamo
15. The Christmas (ザ★クリスマス)
16. 4 Seasons

== Charts ==
Oricon Sales Chart (Japan)

Release	Chart	Peak position	First week sales	Sales total
November 9, 2005	Oricon Daily Charts	1		
November 9, 2005	Oricon Weekly Charts	1		
November 9, 2005	Oricon Monthly Charts			
November 9, 2005	Oricon Yearly Charts	53		256,332
