= The Generous =

Japanese musical duo

the generous
- Origin: Japan
- Genres: Pop, rock
- Years active: 2008–2009
- Label: Tearbridge
- Members: Yoko Yazawa; Katsumi Ohnishi
- Website: www.thegenerous.com

The Generous was a Japanese musical duo consisting of Yoko Yazawa on vocals and Katsumi Ohnishi on guitar. The song "Dream Star" from their mini-album released October 29, 2008 is featured as the first opening theme for the anime Skip Beat!.

== Discography ==
=== Albums ===
- the generous - October 29, 2008
  1. Melody
  2. Dream Star
  3. 旅人
  4. Rainbow
  5. Open your eyes
  6. Melody(English ver.)
  7. Dream Star(English ver.)

=== Singles ===
- "Heart" - March 11, 2009
  1. Heart
  2. 未来への扉
  3. Renaissance
