= Synchronic =

Synchronic may refer to:

- Synchronic (film), a 2019 American science fiction film starring Anthony Mackie and Jamie Dornan
- Synchronic analysis, the analysis of a language at a specific point of time
- Synchronicity, the experience of two or more events that are apparently causally unrelated or unlikely to occur together by chance, yet are experienced as occurring together in a meaningful manner
- Synchronization, the coordination of events to operate a system in unison

== See also ==
- Synchrony (disambiguation)
- Synchronicity (disambiguation)
- Synchronizer (disambiguation)
- Diachronic (disambiguation)
