= Diachronic (disambiguation) =

Diachronic approaches in linguistic analysis consider the development and evolution of a language through history.

Diachronic may also refer to:

- Diachronic linguistics, the scientific study of language change over time
- Diachronism, a sedimentary rock formation in which material varies in age with the place where it was deposited

== See also ==
- Synchronic (disambiguation)
- Dichronic, an anti-inflammatory drug also known as Voltaren or Diclofenac
- Dichroic, material which causes light to be split up into beams of different wavelengths or polarizations
- Max More (born 1964), a futurist and the author of The Diachronic Self
