= Brainwave entrainment =

Neural activity synching to external stimuli

Brainwave entrainment, also referred to as brainwave synchronization or neural entrainment, refers to the observation that brainwaves (large-scale electrical oscillations in the brain) will naturally synchronize to the rhythm of periodic external stimuli, such as flickering lights, speech, music, or tactile stimuli.

As different conscious states can be associated with different dominant brainwave frequencies, it is hypothesized that brainwave entrainment might induce a desired state. Researchers have found, for instance, that acoustic entrainment of delta waves in slow wave sleep had the functional effect of improving memory in healthy subjects.

== History ==
The establishment of the concept of brainwave entrainment is based on several key insights. A relationship between neural activity and external stimuli has been a subject of investigation since Berger's findings (the inventor of EEG) in the late 1920s. He registered event-related desynchronization of the ongoing alpha rhythm, evidenced by an alpha-amplitude decline after stimulation.

The notion of entrainment was introduced in science in the middle of the 20th century as an activation of a timing cue for a biological rhythm, being an inherited circadian oscillator. This biochemical oscillator in animals cycles with a stable phase and is synchronized with solar time. The entrainment concept describes animals' capacity to synchronize with one another or with external stimuli. In 1971, Professor Aschoff and his colleagues pioneered the study of entrainment in biological systems. Their experiments reported that social cues synchronize human circadian rhythms. Since physiology largely reflects neural activity, this discovery demonstrates neural entrainment (or brainwave entrainment ) and shows that neural entrainment to external periodic stimuli is an essential mechanism in physiology.

In 1988, two physiological researchers, Leon Glass and Michael Mackay, contributed to understanding dynamic processes in physiology by explaining "dynamic diseases" that arise from disruptions in the synchronization of vital functions. They explored central theoretical questions about physiological rhythms from the perspectives of biology, medicine, physics, and mathematics. This knowledge provided insights into the development of complex systems theory, explaining how two or more independent, autonomous oscillators with differing rhythms or frequencies, when situated in proximity and able to interact for long enough, influence each other to a degree dependent on the coupling force.

In 1999, Professor Thaut and colleagues demonstrated, in numerous experiments, that acoustic oscillations could entrain movement patterns in patients with neurological disorders, establishing the use of neural entrainment in medicine.

In 2018, Professor McCraty found that one's electrocardiogram signal was registered in another person's electroencephalogram and elsewhere on the other person's body. While this signal was most potent when people were in contact, it was still detectable when subjects were in proximity but not connected. Professor Gordon and colleagues reported the empirical evidence of similar heartbeats' inter-beat intervals (measured by electrocardiograms) of group members due to an external rhythmical oscillator. Quantitative studies have supported the claim that people's heart rates synchronize when they are in close physical proximity to each other.

In 2022, Professor Pejstrup Agger and colleagues invented a novel treatment for Alzheimer's disease, brainwave entrainment using invisible spectral flicker at 40 Hz.

In 2023, Professor Thomas J. Nichting from Eindhoven University of Technology showed evidence of maternal-fetal cardiac coupling, which refers to entrainment of the fetal heart to maternal heart rhythms.

The interaction between the nervous system and the heart is an emerging area of study. In 2024, Latvian professor Igor Val Danilov proposed a theory on the evolutionary basis of brainwave entrainment to external oscillations. He developed a mother-fetus neurocognitive model, which provides neurophysiological insights into how cognition begins through fetal neural entrainment to the natural oscillations (coined natural neurostimulation) produced by the mother's body.

In 2024, researchers from MIT, led by Professor TaeHyun Kim, found that daily exposure to light and sound at 40 hertz may protect cancer patients from chemotherapy-induced damage, memory impairment, and other cognitive effects.

== Origin ==
Brainwave entrainment to the rhythm of periodic external stimuli largely relies on evolutionary mechanisms. A hypothesis of natural neurostimulation explains brainwave entrainment as evolutionarily inherited processes for the mother-fetus nervous system synchronization during gestation, ensuring fetal neural growth and the onset of cognitive functions. According to the prevailing view in cognitive science, the manifestation of cognitive functions is associated with the temporal coordination of neural oscillations across different brain regions. Most brain activities are related to events in which large sets of neurons cooperate, displaying oscillations in four frequency orders, from the infra-low (<0.01 Hz) to ultra-fast (200 Hz) oscillations: delta (0.5–4 Hz), theta (4–8 Hz), alpha activity (8–13 Hz), beta (13–30 Hz), and gamma (30–200 Hz) frequency bands. High-frequency oscillations are associated with the temporal coordination of local cell ensembles. Research reported that they are localized in time and space, reflecting the synchronous activation of smaller ensembles of cells. Considering the propagation of high-frequency waves in tissues over a distance of only a few millimetres, the hypothesis of natural neurostimulation explains why high-frequency oscillations from anatomically non-connected nervous system zones become synchronized.

Based on a review of numerous neuroscience studies, Professor Vinck and colleagues highlighted four hypotheses on a mechanism of temporal coordination:

(1) Oscillatory synchronization (communication-through-coherence);

(2) communication-through-resonance;

(3) nonlinear integration; and

(4) linear signal transmission (coherence-through-communication).

Among them, the idea of brainwave interactions for network oscillatory synchronization is the most influential. Then, Latvian professor Igor Val Danilov extended these findings. He argues that, in temporal coordination, low-frequency heart oscillations can harmonize high-frequency brain oscillations across the nervous system due to the law of interference. Indeed, in physics, when incoherent waves are superimposed, the intensity of the resulting wave is equal to the sum of the powers of the superimposed waves. The energy of the resulting oscillations of each point of the medium is similar to the sum of the energies of its oscillations due to all incoherent waves. So, interference occurs when two oscillations combine: low-frequency oscillations modulate the high ones and propagate them at the distance of their own propagation. In neuroscience, this wave interference, where the phase of the underlying slow rhythm modulates the power of faster oscillations, is often called nested oscillations. Due to the low-frequency waves' ability to propagate over long distances in human tissues, heartbeats-nested high-frequency brain oscillations from anatomically non-connected nervous system zones become synchronized. That is, interference between heart oscillations and high-frequency brain oscillations is crucial for temporal coordination, integrated neuronal processing, and cognition. During pregnancy, the mother's heart oscillations consolidate neuronal activity across both organisms, which coexist in the same ecological context, i.e., voice stimuli from the mother's environment. The fetal environment includes both physicochemical interactions with the mother's body and sounds from the mother's environment that can reach the fetus's auditory system. In this manner, physical interactions between the mother and fetus stimulate the fetal sentience. Due to neural synchrony, particular reactions of the mature nervous system become a template for the naive organism in the early stages of perception development, and subsequently, cognition.

According to Professor Val Danilov, the maternal electromagnetic field, complex acoustic wave, and the mother's ecology are fundamental factors in the proper development of the child's nervous system. The fetal nervous system learns to react in the same way as the mother's nervous system responds to stimuli. The coupling of the two nervous systems in perceiving environmental stimuli contributes to the initiation of cognition and the development of emotions by associating affective cues with stimuli that activate neural pathways for simple reflexes.

== Neural oscillation ==
Neural oscillations are rhythmic or repetitive electrochemical activity in the brain and central nervous system. Such oscillations can be characterized by their frequency, amplitude and phase. Neural tissue can generate oscillatory activity driven by mechanisms within individual neurons, as well as by interactions between them. They may also adjust frequency to synchronize with the periodic vibration of external acoustic or visual stimuli.

The activity of neurons generate electric currents; and the synchronous action of neural ensembles in the cerebral cortex, comprising large numbers of neurons, produce macroscopic oscillations. These phenomena can be monitored and graphically documented by an electroencephalogram (EEG). The EEG representations of those oscillations are typically denoted by the term 'brainwaves' in common parlance.

The technique of recording neural electrical activity within the brain from electrochemical readings taken from the scalp originated with the experiments of Richard Caton in 1875, whose findings were developed into EEG by Hans Berger in the late 1920s.

== Neural oscillation and cognitive functions ==
The functional role of neural oscillations is still not fully understood; however they have been shown to correlate with emotional responses, motor control, and a number of cognitive functions including information transfer, perception, and memory. Specifically, neural oscillations, in particular theta activity, are extensively linked to memory function, and coupling between theta and gamma activity is considered to be vital for memory functions, including episodic memory.

== Etymology ==
Entrainment is a concept first identified by the Dutch physicist Christiaan Huygens in 1665 who discovered the phenomenon during an experiment with pendulum clocks: He set them each in motion and found that when he returned the next day, the sway of their pendulums had all synchronized.

Such entrainment occurs because small amounts of energy are transferred between the two systems when they are out of phase in such a way as to produce negative feedback. As they assume a more stable phase relationship, the amount of energy gradually reduces to zero, with systems of greater frequency slowing down, and the other speeding up.

The term 'entrainment' has been used to describe a shared tendency of many physical and biological systems to synchronize their periodicity and rhythm through interaction. This tendency has been identified as specifically pertinent to the study of sound and music generally, and acoustic rhythms specifically. The most familiar examples of neuromotor entrainment to acoustic stimuli is observable in spontaneous foot or finger tapping to the rhythmic beat of a song.

Brainwaves, or neural oscillations, share the fundamental constituents with acoustic and optical waves, including frequency, amplitude and periodicity. Consequently, Huygens' discovery precipitated inquiry into whether or not the synchronous electrical activity of cortical neural ensembles might not only alter in response to external acoustic or optical stimuli but also entrain or synchronize their frequency to that of a specific stimulus.

Brainwave entrainment is a colloquialism for 'neural entrainment', which is a term used to denote the way in which the aggregate frequency of oscillations produced by the synchronous electrical activity in ensembles of cortical neurons can adjust to synchronize with the periodic vibration of external stimuli, such as a sustained acoustic frequency perceived as pitch, a regularly repeating pattern of intermittent sounds, perceived as rhythm, or of a regularly rhythmically intermittent flashing light.

== See also ==
- Beat (acoustics)
- Electroencephalography
- Neural oscillation
- Neural synchrony
- Behavioural synchrony
- Shared intentionality
