= Synchronization (disambiguation) =

Synchronization is the coordination of events to operate a system in unison.

Synchronization may also refer to:

- Synchronization (alternating current), the process of matching the speed and frequency of a generator or other source to a running network
- Synchronization (computer science), the synchronization of processes and data
- Synchronization (Nazi Germany) or Gleichschaltung, the process by which the Nazi Party established control over all aspects of German society
- Synchronization rights, also called "sync licensing", to provide copyright permission for music to be used in video, videogames, or other AV works

== See also ==
- Sync (disambiguation)
- Synchronization in telecommunications
