= Neural synchrony =

Correlation of brain activity across two or more people over time

Neural synchrony is the correlation of brain activity across two or more people over time. In social and affective neuroscience, neural synchrony specifically refers to the degree of similarity between the spatio-temporal neural fluctuations of multiple people. This phenomenon represents the convergence and coupling of different people's neurocognitive systems, and it is thought to be the neural substrate for many forms of interpersonal dynamics and shared experiences. A hypothesis of natural neurostimulation explains the correlation of brain activity across two or more organisms as an evolutionary mechanism of the nervous system growth (see section "Origin"). Some research also refers to neural synchrony as inter-brain synchrony, brain-to-brain coupling, inter-subject correlation, between-brain connectivity, or neural coupling. In the current literature, neural synchrony is notably distinct from intra-brain synchrony—sometimes also called neural synchrony—which denotes the coupling of activity across regions of a single individual's brain.

Neural synchrony approaches represent an important theoretical and methodological contribution to the field. Since its conception, studies of neural synchrony have helped elucidate the mechanisms underlying social phenomena, including communication, narrative processing, coordination, and cooperation. By emphasizing the social dynamics of the brain, this area of research has played a critical role in making neuroscience more attuned to people's social proclivities—a perspective that is often lost on individual-level approaches to understanding the brain.

== History ==
=== Motivation ===
Driven by the desire to understand the social nature of the human brain, the study of neural synchrony stems from social cognition, a subfield of psychology that explores how we understand and interact with other people through processes like mentalization or theory of mind. Given that it relies on measuring brain activity, neural synchrony also has its roots in cognitive neuroscience.

Despite the growth of social cognition and cognitive neuroscience prior to the early 2000s, research into the brain neglected interpersonal processes, focusing mostly on the neural mechanisms of individuals' behaviors. Furthermore, neuroscience research that did probe social questions only investigated how social processes affect neural dynamics in a single brain. Considering that researchers clearly recognized how interpersonal interaction was fundamental to human cognition, the paucity of social and multi-brain neuroscience research represented a tension in the field. In response to the discrepancy between the complexity of social interaction and the single-brain focus of cognitive neuroscience, researchers called for a multi-person, interaction-oriented approach to understanding the brain.

=== Early history ===
In 2002, the American neuroscientist P. Read Montague articulated the need to examine the neural activity of multiple individuals at one time. To this point, Montague and his colleagues wrote, "Studying social interactions by scanning the brain of just one person is analogous to studying synapses while observing either the presynaptic neuron or the postsynaptic neuron, but never both simultaneously." They performed the first brain scan of more than one person by using functional magnetic resonance imaging (fMRI) to take simultaneous recordings of two people engaged in a simple deception game. While this study marked the first example of multi-brain neuroimaging, in 2005, King-Casas and others combined neuroimaging with an economic exchange game to conduct the first study that directly compared neural activity between pairs of subjects. Since then, multi-brain imaging studies have grown in popularity, leading to the formation of preliminary neural synchrony frameworks.

Early conceptualizations of neural synchrony, largely shaped by the work of Uri Hasson at Princeton University, were motivated by models of stimulus-to-brain coupling. In these models, aspects of the physical environment emit mechanical, chemical, and electromagnetic signals, which the brain receives and translates into electrical impulses that guide our actions and allow us to understand the world. Researchers presumed that the synchronization of neural activity between two brains should leverage the same system that binds one's neural activity to environmental stimuli. If the stimulus is another person, then the perceptual system of one brain may couple with the behaviors or emotions of the other person, causing "vicarious activations" that manifest as synchronized neural responses across perceiver and agent. According to the theory, this process also occurs through more complex, synergistic interactions, especially when people communicate and convey meaning.

=== Further development ===
Over the last two decades, neural synchrony has become an increasingly common topic of study in social and affective neuroscience research, spurring conceptual and methodological development. Along with an emphasis on ecologically valid, naturalistic experimental designs, the focus on multi-brain neuroscience studies has increased researchers' ability to explore neural synchrony in social contexts. As a result, conceptualizations of neural synchrony have been expanded to incorporate a wider range of ideas, though it is often viewed as a neural correlate for two or more people's shared experiences. Studies now involve a variety of social processes, with applications spanning simple motor synchronization to classroom learning.

Notable methodological advancements have come from the evolution of multi-brain imaging techniques beyond fMRI, especially magnetoencephalography/electroencephalography (MEG/EEG) and functional near-infrared spectroscopy (fNIRS)—methods which afford more socially interactive experimental designs. These technologies are also complemented by comprehensive data processing techniques that are useful in multi-brain analyses, such as Granger causality or Phase Locking Value (PLV).

As a progressively paradigmatic approach in social and affective neuroscience, neural synchrony undergirds the field's search for the brain basis of social interaction.

A 2022 study by the University of Helsinki measured brain synchronization among players during cooperative online video gaming.

In 2024, Latvian scientist Igor Val Danilov from Riga Nordic University introduced the mother-fetus neurocognitive model. It explains cognitive development of the naive organism (fetus) where neural synchrony provides the mature (mother) and naive organisms cooperative interactions with the environment that ensure gaining positive/negative valence of stimuli by the naive organism. The significance of this model lies in explaining how the naive organism, with no prior experience, begins to categorize the world through positive/negative valence of stimuli.

== Origin ==
A hypothesis of natural neurostimulation explains the correlation of brain activity across two or more organisms as an evolutionarily inherited mechanism of nervous system growth. Inspired by recent findings in ontogeny, Latvian professor Igor Val Danilov argues that proper nervous system development in a child during gestation is facilitated by physical interactions with the mother, where the mother's heart plays a central role. Indeed, the most potent physical forces in the human body are the low-frequency pulsed electromagnetic field and the complex acoustic wave of the heart; research shows evidence of the heart-brain interplay. During pregnancy, the mother's heart oscillations consolidate neuronal activity in both organisms indwelling in the same ecological context, i.e. voice stimuli from the mother's environment. The environment of the fetus includes both physicochemical interactions with the mother's body and sounds from the mother's environment that can reach the auditory system of the fetus. In this manner, physical interactions between the mother and fetus stimulate the fetal sentience. Adequate sentience (the ability of neurons to transmit electrochemical signals to other cells and to respond appropriately to electrochemical signals received from other cells) is the proper response to specific input stimuli through the sensory system. Due to neural synchrony, particular reactions of the mature nervous system become a template for the naive organism in the early stages of perception development, and subsequently, cognition. Research shows that the maternal electromagnetic field, complex acoustic wave, and the mother's ecology are fundamental factors in the proper development of the child's nervous system. The fetal nervous system learns to react in the same way as the mother's nervous system responds to stimuli. The coupling of the two nervous systems in perceiving environmental stimuli contributes to the initiation of cognition and the development of emotions through the association of affective cues with stimuli that activate neural pathways for simple reflexes. This explanation of cognitive development as a function of the mature and naive organisms cooperative interaction with the environment is called the mother-fetus neurocognitive model. The model argues that cognitive development is inherently a social process that begins months before the first breath. The mother does not just sustain the fetus physically; she acts as a biological "proxy" that interprets the complexity of the world into a binary language of safety and danger, effectively sculpting the architecture of the developing mind. This hypothesis contributes to understanding ontogenesis, particularly the binding problem and of morphogenesis in the early stages of development.

== Methods ==
=== Hyperscanning ===
The study of neural synchrony is predicated on advanced neuroimaging methods, particularly hyperscanning. Coined in 2002 by Montague et al., hyperscanning refers to the method of simultaneously measuring the hemodynamic or neuroelectric responses of two or more brains as they engage with the same task or stimulus. The ability to record time-locked activity from multiple brains makes hyperscanning conducive to exploring the variation in activity across brains. It also allows experimenters to examine various aspects of neural recordings in naturalistic scenarios, from low-level stimulus processing to high-level social cognition. For these reasons, hyperscanning has helped foster a systematic investigation of interpersonal dynamics at the level of the brain.

Though hyperscanning has become the most common imaging technique for studying neural synchrony, researchers do not necessarily need to scan brains simultaneously. Sometimes referred to as off-line measurement, or "pseudo-hyperscanning"; this alternative approach follows the same basic premise as hyperscanning, except that participants' brain activity is recorded one at a time. Data from different scans of isolated participants are then analyzed to compare functional similarities during identical tasks or stimuli.

=== Imaging techniques ===
Hyperscanning and off-line scanning methods can be achieved through common noninvasive hemodynamic or neuroelectric brain imaging techniques. A review of neural synchrony hyperscanning studies showed that the most prevalent methods are EEG, fNIRS, and fMRI, which account for 47%, 35%, and 17% of studies, respectively. Each technique offers unique contributions to the understanding of neural synchrony given their relative advantages and limitations.

EEG measures the brain's electrical activity through the scalp. It is widely used to study neural synchrony because of its superior millisecond-range temporal resolution. Though susceptible to head movements, EEG still allows for exploring neural synchrony through naturalistic designs where people can interact socially. The downside to EEG is its relatively poor spatial resolution, which makes it difficult to elucidate spatial qualities of brain activation in social contexts.

fNIRS uses near infrared waves to measure the blood-oxygen-level-dependent (BOLD) response in the brain. It is an increasingly popular imaging method for neural synchrony studies because of its portability and motion tolerance, which makes it ideal for testing real-world social stimuli. fNIRS only measures the cortical regions of the brain, and its temporal resolution is not as fine as EEG. However, the balance between spatial and temporal properties, combined with subjects' ability to move around and interact with relative freedom during scanning, qualify fNIRS as a versatile option for exploring neural synchrony.

fMRI uses magnetic resonance to measure the brain's BOLD response. The major advantage of fMRI is the precise spatial resolution. fMRI allows researchers to examine in-depth neurocognitive processes that occur across brains. However, fMRI has low temporal resolution, is highly sensitive to motion, and requires that subjects lie flat in a loud MRI machine while interacting with a screen. These factors pose limitations to the study of neural synchrony, which often calls for naturalistic environments and tasks that are representative of real-world social contexts.

=== Analysis ===
A standard approach to investigating neural synchrony, especially with data from naturalistic experimental designs, is inter-subject correlation (ISC). Often, ISC is the Pearson correlation, or robust regression, of spatio-temporal patterns of neural activity in multiple subjects. In ISC, an individual's brain responses are either correlated across the average of the other subjects in a leave-one-out analysis, or all pairs of subjects are correlated in a pairwise analysis. This method leverages time-locked stimuli in order to understand how brain activity across participants relates to different parts of the task. Rather than focusing on the strength of activation in brain areas, ISC explores the variability in neural activity across subjects, allowing researchers to probe the level of similarity or idiosyncrasy in people's brain responses. Shared variance in neural activity is assumed to be indicative of similar processing of identical stimuli or tasks. Similar to the general linear model, it is important to compare ISC values to a null, which can be derived from recordings of resting states or irrelevant stimuli. Because it depends on extended designs that allow for activity recording over time, ISC is especially conducive to social interaction studies, which makes it a powerful approach for exploring neural synchrony in social contexts. However, ISC depends on stimulus-driven responses, which poses difficulties for researchers interested in resting-state activity.

Recently, inter-subject representational similarity analysis (IS-RSA) has been put forward as a way to detect the individual differences, or "idiosynchrony," across people experiencing naturalistic experimental stimuli. This analysis takes the neural synchrony of each subject to the other subjects and relates it to known individual behavioral measures, allowing researchers to compare multi-person-level brain data with individual-level traits and behaviors.

=== Best practices ===
Neural synchrony is a relatively new area of study that affords a variety of approaches, and no prevailing paradigm exists to collect, analyze, and interpret the data. Many decisions, such as imaging techniques or analysis methods, depend on researchers' goals. However, there are some generally agreed upon best practices when designing these experiments. For example, sample sizes of about 30 are necessary to acquire reliable and reproducible statistical ISC maps. Furthermore, when studying shared responses, researchers typically prefer a strong stimulus that is able to generate significant brain responses, allowing researchers to detect greater levels of neural synchrony across participants. The exception to this preference is when researchers are more interested in the individual differences that drive synchrony. In these cases, researchers should employ stimuli that are strong enough to evoke neural synchrony, yet modest enough to maintain sufficient neural variability that researchers can later relate to the variability in behavioral measures.

One of the biggest considerations for conducting neural synchrony studies concerns the ecological validity of the design. As an inherently social phenomenon, neural synchrony calls for multidimensional stimuli that emulate the richness of the social world. Furthermore, by nature of how it is measured—through computing the variance in multiple brains' responses to a task over time—neural synchrony is particularly amenable to extended social stimuli. Ecological designs are notably difficult in most neuroimaging studies, yet they are especially important for capturing social processes, and they also play to the strengths and affordances of neural synchrony approaches.

== Experimental evidence and implications ==
=== Communication ===
Examining neural synchrony through multi-brain studies has offered insight into the shared and idiosyncratic aspects of human communication. As a potential neural mechanism for the effective transfer of information across brains, neural synchrony has shown how brain activity temporally and spatially couples when people communicate. Synchrony during communication occurs in a number of brain frequencies and regions, notably alpha and gamma bands, the temporal parietal junction, and inferior frontal areas.

In a seminal study, Stephens et al. demonstrated this inter-brain link through an fMRI analysis of speakers and listeners. Using the speaker's spatial and temporal neural responses to model the listener's responses during natural verbal communication, they found that brain activity synchronized in dyads in both a delayed and anticipatory manner, but this synchrony failed to occur when subjects did not communicate (e.g., speaking in a language the listener does not understand). Greater synchrony across brains, especially in the predictive anticipatory responses, indicated better scores on comprehension measures. Building on this work, other research has sought to pinpoint communicative factors associated with neural synchrony. By manipulating conversation modality and instruction, research has found that neural synchrony is strongest during face-to-face conversations that incorporate turn-taking behavior and multi-sensory verbal and nonverbal interaction. Network structure dynamics also play a role in neural synchrony, such that central figures, like conversation leaders, tend to show greater neural synchrony than non-leaders with other discussion partners.

Neural synchrony is also found in nonverbal communication, such as hand gestures and facial expressions. An early study found synchronization across participants playing a game of charades. Using fMRI to record brain activity as people gestured or watched the gestures, researchers found synchronized temporal variation in brain activity in mirror neuron and mentalizing systems. Another study showed that communicative behaviors like shared gaze and positive affect expression generated neural synchrony in romantic partners, though not in strangers. As a whole, neural synchrony studies surrounding verbal, multi-sensory, and nonverbal communication demonstrate its potential as a tool for exploring the underlying mechanisms of interpersonal communication.

=== Narrative processing ===
Another focus of neural synchrony studies involves narrative processing. This direction of research has some crossover with neural synchrony studies of communication, but there remains sufficient interest in the similarities and differences in how people specifically process multimodal narrative information, such as watching movies, hearing stories, or reading passages. Importantly, narrative processing studies of neural synchrony observe hierarchical levels of processing that unfold over time, starting in areas responsible for low-level processing of auditory or visual stimuli. As semantic information becomes more salient in the narrative, synchronized processing moves to more integrative networks, such as the inferior parietal lobe or temporal parietal junction.

Research shows that neural synchrony is indicative of the similarity in people's narrative recall and understanding, even for ambiguous narratives. One study demonstrated this phenomenon using Heider and Simmel's classic paradigm, where simple shapes move around the screen in a way that causes people to imbue the shapes with stories and social meaning. Participants who interpreted the movement of shapes in similar ways showed greater neural synchrony in cortical brain regions. This connection between neural synchrony and similarity in comprehension reliably occurs across other types of narratives, including listening to stories and free viewing of visual content, and it persists throughout different stages of the narrative, such as consuming the story, recalling the story, and listening to another person recall the story. Together, these findings highlight neural synchrony as a reliable neural mechanism for the convergence of people's hierarchical narrative processing, suggesting that synchrony plays a critical role in how, if, and why we see meaning in the world similarly.

=== Coordination ===
The pursuit of complex goals for individuals or groups depends on successful coordination, and neural synchrony provides a window into the underlying mechanisms of these processes as well. A review of hyperscanning research shows that neural synchrony approaches have explored coordination through a range of paradigms, including joint attention, movements, ideas, and tasks. These findings also demonstrate synchronization across a variety of brain areas associated with sharing actions and mentalizing, namely the inferior and temporal parietal areas, as well as alpha band and other frequencies. Furthermore, converging evidence suggests that inter-brain models (i.e., neural synchrony) are more effective than intra-brain models at predicting performance for tasks requiring social coordination.

Understanding how coordination via joint attention relates to neural synchrony, and how this relationship drives performance, is of particular interest to researchers. Research shows that even simple social interactions, like attention convergence, can induce synchrony. For example, in a task where one participant must direct another participant to a target location through eye gazing only, which requires that both participants eventually coordinate eye movements, researchers found significant neural synchrony in mentalizing regions of interacting pairs. Other studies show strong neural synchrony during simple coordinated events like hand and finger movement imitation, humming, and even eye-blinking.

Coordination studies also find neural synchrony in more complex social coordinations. A set of studies has demonstrated the prevalence of neural synchrony in music production while people coordinate rhythms and movements. Early studies showed that dyads of guitarists generate greater low frequency band neural synchrony when playing together than when playing solo. Also, people who performed distinct roles in an intricate musical piece showed synchrony between brains during periods of coordination. Another series of studies examined pilots and copilots in a flight simulator, finding that synchrony was strongest when the situation demanded more social coordination, such as during stressful scenarios or takeoff and landing. These findings implicate neural synchrony as a reliable correlate of social coordination, even when interactions call for coordination of various forms and complexities.

=== Cooperation ===
As measured through tasks that involve interactive decision-making and games, results from the field suggest a close association between neural synchrony and cooperation. Decision-making contexts and games that demand greater levels of social, high-level, and goal-directed engagement with other people are typically more conducive to neural synchrony. In this domain, researchers are particularly interested in how neural synchrony levels vary depending on whether people collaborate, compete, or play alone.

For example, one study that employed a computer video game found high levels of neural synchrony – and better performance – across subjects when they played on the same team, but this effect disappeared when people played against each other or by themselves. Similarly, researchers that administered a puzzle solving task found neural synchrony for people when they are working as a team, yet synchrony decreased for the same people when they worked separately or watched others solve the puzzle. Another study using a classic prisoner's dilemma game showed that participants experienced higher neural synchrony with each other in the high-cooperation-context conditions than they did in the low-cooperation-context conditions or when they interacted with the computer. Subjective measures of perceived cooperativeness mediated this effect. Critically, the idea that neural synchrony is robust during cooperation, that more interactive and demanding cooperative tasks recruit greater neural synchrony, and that better cooperation often links to better performance is corroborated throughout the neural synchrony literature.

=== Individual-level differences ===
Much of the neural synchrony literature examines how stimuli drive responses across multiple brains. Because these responses are often task-dependent, it becomes hard to disentangle state-level factors from individual-level factors (e.g., traits). However, creative experimental designs, access to certain populations, and advances in analysis methods, like IS-RSA, have offered some recent insight into how individual-level differences affect neural synchrony.

Using an ambiguous social narrative, Finn et al. report that individuals with high-trait paranoia showed stronger neural synchrony with each other in socially-motivated cortical regions than they did with low-trait paranoia subjects - a finding that also scales when examining the semantic and syntactic similarities of their narrative recall. Similarly, research shows that people's cognitive styles affect their level of synchrony with each other. In response to viewing a film, Bacha-Trams et al. demonstrated that holistic thinkers showed greater neural synchrony with each other, and presumably understood the film more similarly, than analytic thinkers did with each other. The two groups also exhibited within-group synchrony in different brain regions.

The idea that individual-level differences affect neural synchrony extends to clinical areas as well. Some research indicates that people who manage autism spectrum disorder exhibit distinct and diminished patterns of neural synchrony compared to people without autism spectrum disorder. Clinically driven discrepancies in neural synchrony have also been shown to increase along with symptom severity.

=== The brain-as-predictor approach ===
Neural synchrony has major implications for the brain-as-predictor approach, which encourages the use of neuroimaging data to predict robust, ecologically valid behavioral outcomes. The brain-as-predictor approach has been effective in predicting outcomes across a variety of domains, including health and consumer choices. Given its social nature, neural synchrony has the potential to build on brain-as-predictor models by allowing for predictions about real-world social processes. Some researchers have started to employ this approach.

In one study, members of a bounded social network watched a battery of short audiovisual movies in an MRI scanner. Hypothesizing that similarity in neural responses tracks with social closeness, the researchers used the strength of neural synchrony measures across participants to reliably predict real-world social network proximity and friendship. Another example of how neural synchrony can be leveraged to predict outcomes involves the use of neural reference groups, which can predict behaviors like partisan stance on controversial topics at above-chance levels. This approach requires identifying groups of people that perceive and respond to the world in similar ways, measuring their brain activity and dispositional attitudes related to any stimuli of interest, and then using a synchrony-based classification method to predict whether new individuals see the world similarly or differently depending on their synchrony with the reference group. Together, these findings illustrate the power and potential for neural synchrony to contribute to brain-as-predictor models, ultimately framing neural synchrony as a tool for understanding real-world outcomes above and beyond behavioral measures alone.

== See also ==
- Social cognition
- Social neuroscience
- Cognitive neuroscience
- Behavioural synchrony
- Brainwave entrainment
- Group cohesiveness
- Electroencephalography
- Functional near-infrared spectroscopy
- Functional magnetic resonance imaging
