= 2Backka =

Japanese hip-hop group

2BACKKA (ツーバッカ, Tsū Bakka) is a Japanese hip-hop (also known as lyrical pop in Japan) group formed in 1999. Their single "Namida," released on November 5, 2008, is the first ending theme to the anime Skip Beat!. Their single, "Sky もう一度あの時のように" was used for the soundtrack to the 2005 Xbox 360 video game Project Gotham Racing 3.

Their singles "Home" and "Namida" reached 65 and 87 on the Oricon Singles Chart.
