= Synchronicity (Bennie K album) =

Studio album by Bennie K
- Released: November 4, 2004
- Recorded: 2004
- Genre: J-Pop, Urban
- Label: For Life (FLCF-4031) CD
- Producer: Bennie K

Bennie K chronology
essence (2003)	Synchronicity (2004)	Japana-rhythm (2005)

Synchronicity is Bennie K's third album.

== Track listing ==
CD Track List:

1. Synchroni-city ~Opening~
2. Oasis feat. Diggy-MO' (Soul'd Out) (オアシス)
3. Treasure
4. Sunrise (サンライズ)
5. Okay
6. Stay Awhile ~Interlude~
7. 1 4 3 ~Yuki's Room~
8. Draculea ~Cico's Castle~
9. Benkei & Ushiwakamaru (弁慶&牛若丸)
10. Tengu VS Benkei feat. Sea-Mo Nator (シーモネーター) (天狗VS弁慶)
11. Puppy Love feat. Gipper (Nora)
12. Lost Paradise feat. Tsuyoshi
13. Sunday"after"noon

== Charts ==
Oricon Sales Chart (Japan)

Total sold: 341,626

Release	Chart	Peak Position	First Week Sales	Sales Total	Chart Run
November 4, 2004	Oricon Daily Charts				
November 4, 2004	Oricon Weekly Charts	5			
November 4, 2004	Oricon Monthly Charts				
November 4, 2004	Oricon Yearly Charts	#71 (2005)			
