= Synchronizer =

Synchronizer may refer to:

- Part of a synchromesh manual transmission in an automobile
- Synchronization gear, a device that permits a gun to fire between the blades of a revolving airplane propeller
- Arbiter (electronics), which orders signals in asynchronous circuit
- Synchronizer, an electronic circuit technique; see metastability in electronics
- Synchronizer (film editing), a device for aligning multiple film strips in a replay or editing device
- Synchronizer (algorithm), an algorithm that can be applied to a synchronous distributed algorithm to produce a version that operates in asynchronous networks

== See also ==
- Synchrony (disambiguation)
- Synchronicity (disambiguation)
- Synchronization
