= Behavioural synchrony =

Ability to coordinate collective action

The term behavioural synchrony refers to the ability of a group of agents to coordinate collective action efficiently, a concept originally introduced by a series of empirical animal and human studies, and modelling papers in animals, and humans. The agents are trying to coordinate collective action on a social network in which the communication is restricted to dyadic information flows.

== Research background ==
The behavioural synchrony model universe relies on two key sets of assumptions. The first set of assumptions concerns the structure of the network: it is assumed that (a) the agents form a social network in a way that the network is connected, i.e., all agents have some direct or indirect connection to every other agent, and sparse, i.e., the network the agents form is not fully connected; and (b) all agents have the same network degree, i.e., every agent is connected to the same number of other agents. In network science terms, the assumption is that the agents form a k-regular n-sized connected graph, where k is the degree of the agents, and n is the number of agents. The second set of assumptions concern the nature of coordination: it is assumed that the content of the coordination is not important (independent of whether it is a linguistic cue, cultural identity, or simple compass direction), but is set up in a way that the agents cannot guess the location of the final convergence point of the group from any individual information exchange. These assumptions cause coordination to slow, where the speed is dependent on the network structure, and the agents need to think hard during the coordination process.

The behavioural synchrony approach introduced behavioural realism into social network coordination, via assuming that the network structure is similar to actual human groups, and by making the coordination process not-trivial, and thus making the modelled group processes reflect human behaviour. The behavioural synchrony approach has led to a range of human application, especially concerning the human evolutionary past:

- Synchronisation of physical activity, especially of exertion, contributes to group bonding.
- Social hierarchy can be beneficial for collective action, but can lead to stratification and elite delineation that is harmful for collective action.
- Supernatural beliefs, especially when mediated by a priestly cast, can increase the efficiency of large but not small groups.
- Increased brain size during human evolution only leads to increased cooperation efficiency if associated with increased complexity of communication, in particular with language.
- All lasting human societies must have found a solution to regulate social inequality.

== See also ==
- Human behaviour
- Human evolution
- Dunbar's number
- Robin Dunbar
- Social network
- Neural Synchrony
