= Synchrony =

Synchrony may refer to:

- Synchronization, the coordination of events to operate a system in unison
- Synchrony and diachrony, viewpoints in linguistic analysis
- Behavioural synchrony, coordinated action in animals and humans
- Synchrony Financial, an American financial services company
- Synchrony (Dune), a fictional planet
- "Synchrony" (The X-Files), an episode of the American science fiction television series The X-Files

== See also ==
- Synchronic (disambiguation)
- Synchronicity (disambiguation)
