= Koda Kumi discography =

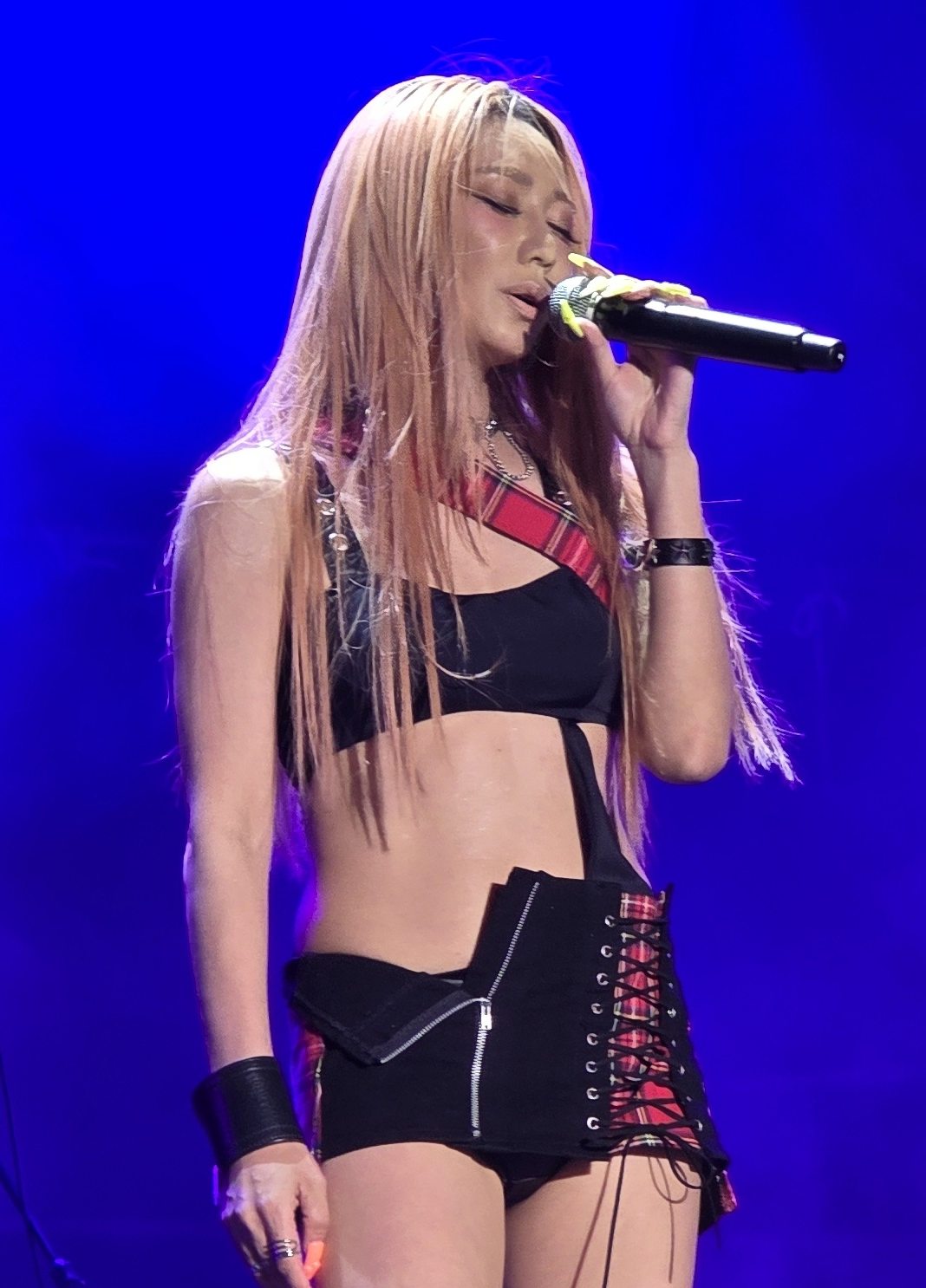
- Koda in 2025
- Studio albums: 18
- Extended plays: 4
- Live albums: 9
- Compilation albums: 10
- Remix albums: 12
- Singles: 57

The discography of Japanese pop singer Koda Kumi includes 18 studio albums, 2 cover albums, 10 compilation albums, 10 remix albums, 9 live albums and 57 singles. All of her Japanese musical releases have been with Rhythm Zone, a sub-label of Avex Group.

Koda originally debuted in the United States on Orpheus Records under the name Koda, with the singles "Take Back" (2000) and later "Trust Your Love" (2001), sung in English. The Japanese versions of these songs were used for her debut in Japan, and were released in December 2000 and May 2001. Her first album, Affection, was released in March 2002.

In the 12 weeks between December 2005 and February 2006, Koda released a single consecutively every week, which resulted in her first number one singles in Japan, "You" and "Feel". Her 2005 and 2006 compilation albums Best: First Things and Best: Second Session were both certified for two million copies shipped by the Recording Industry Association of Japan. Koda was the top-selling artist in Japan during 2006 and 2007 according to Oricon, earning ¥12.7 billion in 2006 and approximately ¥7.3 billion in 2007.

Starting in 2006 with 4 Hot Wave, Koda started to release annual summer singles featuring multiple promoted A-sides. This continued with "Freaky" (2007), Moon (2008), 3 Splash (2009), Gossip Candy (2010), 4 Times (2011), Summer Trip (2013), and "Hotel" (2014). Songs from these releases were compiled onto the album Summer of Love in 2015.

From 2009, Koda began releasing a series of non-stop dance remix albums called Driving Hit's, featuring songs from her career mixed together into a 70-minute medley remix. In October 2010, Koda released her first album of covers, entitled Eternity: Love & Songs, featuring recordings of songs by Japanese musicians. Her second, Color the Cover, was released in February 2013.

== Albums ==
=== Studio albums ===
List of albums, with selected chart positions
Title	Album details	Peak positions			Sales (Note: Sales provided by Oricon database and are rounded to the nearest thousand copies.)	Certifications
Title	Album details	JPN	TWN (Note: Week references for G-Music: Black Cherry 2007 week 3, Kingdom 2008 week 7, Trick 2009 week 7, Universe 2010 week 6, Dejavu 2011 week 10, Japonesque 2012 week 6, Bon Voyage 2014 week 11.)	TWN East Asia	Sales	Certifications
Affection	Released: March 27, 2002; Label: Rhythm Zone; Formats: CD, digital download	12	—	—	JPN: 105,360	RIAJ: Gold
Grow into One	Released: March 19, 2003; Label: Rhythm Zone; Formats: CD, digital download	8	—	—	JPN: 201,033	RIAJ: Gold
Feel My Mind	Released: February 2, 2004; Label: Rhythm Zone; Formats: CD, digital download	7	—	—	JPN: 153,746	RIAJ: Gold
Secret	Released: February 9, 2005; Label: Rhythm Zone; Formats: CD, CD/DVD, digital download	3	—	—	JPN: 600,201	RIAJ: 2× Platinum
Black Cherry	Released: December 20, 2006; Label: Rhythm Zone; Formats: CD, CD/DVD, CD/2DVD, digital download	1	10	1	JPN: 1,031,000	RIAJ: Million
Kingdom	Released: January 30, 2008; Label: Rhythm Zone; Formats: CD, CD/DVD, CD/2DVD, digital download	1	3	1	JPN: 750,000	RIAJ: 3× Platinum
Trick	Released: January 28, 2009; Label: Rhythm Zone; Formats: CD, CD/DVD, CD/2DVD, digital download	1	7	1	JPN: 391,000	RIAJ: 2× Platinum
Universe	Released: February 3, 2010; Label: Rhythm Zone; Formats: 2CD, 2CD/DVD, digital download	1	18	4	JPN: 372,000	RIAJ: Platinum
Dejavu	Released: March 2, 2011; Label: Rhythm Zone; Formats: CD, CD/DVD, CD/2DVD, digital download	1	16	3	JPN: 211,000	RIAJ: Platinum
Japonesque	Released: January 25, 2012; Label: Rhythm Zone; Formats: CD, CD/DVD, CD/2DVD, digital download	1	15	1	JPN: 151,000	RIAJ: Gold
Bon Voyage	Released: February 26, 2014; Label: Rhythm Zone; Formats: CD, CD/DVD, CD/Live DVD, CD/Blu-ray, digital download	1	11	3	JPN: 59,000	
Walk of My Life	Released: March 18, 2015; Label: Rhythm Zone; Formats: CD, CD/DVD, CD/Live DVD, CD/Blu-ray, digital download	1	—	—	JPN: 50,000	
W Face ~inside~	Released: March 8, 2017; Label: Rhythm Zone; Formats: CD, CD/DVD, CD/Blu-ray, digital download	2	—	—	JPN: 28,000	
W Face ~outside~	Released: March 8, 2017; Label: Rhythm Zone; Formats: CD, CD/DVD, CD/Blu-ray, digital download	1	—	—	JPN: 28,000	
And	Released: February 28, 2018; Label: Rhythm Zone; Formats: CD, CD/DVD, CD/Blu-ray, digital download	6	—	—	JPN: 19,000	
DNA	Released: August 22, 2018; Label: Rhythm Zone; Formats: CD, CD/DVD, CD/Blu-ray, CD+3DVD, digital download	3	—	—	JPN: 20,000	
re(CORD)	Released: November 13, 2019; Label: Rhythm Zone; Formats: CD, CD/DVD, CD/Blu-ray, CD+3DVD, digital download	4	—	—	JPN: 16,000	
Heart	Released: March 2, 2022; Label: Rhythm Zone; Formats: CD, CD/DVD, CD/Blu-ray, CD+3DVD, digital download	9	—	—	JPN: 6,000	
Unicorn	Released: April 17, 2024; Label: Rhythm Zone; Formats: CD, CD/DVD, CD/Blu-ray, digital download	14	—	—	JPN: 3,000	

=== Tribute and cover albums ===
List of albums, with selected chart positions
Title	Album details	Peak positions		Sales	Certifications
Title	Album details	JPN	TWN East Asia (Note: Week references for G-Music: Color the Cover 2013 week 10.)	Sales	Certifications
Eternity: Love & Songs	Released: October 13, 2010; Label: Rhythm Zone; Formats: CD, digital download	3	—	JPN: 92,000	RIAJ: Gold
Color the Cover	Released: February 27, 2013; Label: Rhythm Zone; Formats: CD, digital download	3	12	JPN: 48,000	

=== Compilation albums ===
List of albums, with selected chart positions
Title	Album details	Peak positions			Sales	Certifications
Title	Album details	JPN	TWN (Note: Week references for G-Music: First Things 2005 week 40 and 41, Second Session 2006 week 12, Bounce & Lovers 2007 week 15, Universe 2010 week 6.)	TWN East Asian	Sales	Certifications
Best: First Things	Released: September 21, 2005; Label: Rhythm Zone; Formats: 2CD, 2CD/DVD, digital download	1	15	2	JPN: 1,917,000	RIAJ: 2× Million
Best: Second Session	Released: March 8, 2006; Label: Rhythm Zone; Formats: CD, CD/DVD, CD/2DVD, digital download	1	14	2	JPN: 1,804,000	RIAJ: 2× Million
Best: Bounce & Lovers	Released: March 14, 2007; Label: Rhythm Zone; Formats: CD/DVD, digital download	2	16	1	JPN: 296,000	RIAJ: Platinum
Out Works & Collaboration Best	Released: March 25, 2009; Label: Rhythm Zone; Formats: CD, digital download	7	—	—	JPN: 49,000	
Best: Third Universe	Packaged as Best: Third Universe/Universe; Released: February 3, 2010; Label: Rhythm Zone; Formats: CD, 2CD, 2CD/DVD, digital download	1	18	4	JPN: 372,000	RIAJ: Platinum
Summer Single Collection 2013	Released: July 31, 2013; Label: Rhythm Zone; Formats: digital download	—	—	—		
mu-mo Gentai Koda Kumi 2013 Summer Best 3	Released: September 30, 2013; Label: Rhythm Zone; Formats: digital download	—	—	—		
mu-mo Gentai Koda Kumi 2013 Summer Best 6	Released: September 30, 2013; Label: Rhythm Zone; Formats: digital download	—	—	—		
Kumi Koda Complete Best	Released: October 1, 2013; Label: AVEX MARKETING INC; Formats: CD	—	—	—		
Winter Ballad Collection 2013	Released: November 13, 2013; Label: Rhythm Zone; Formats: digital download	—	—	—		
Happy Love Song Collection 2014	Released: June 6, 2014; Label: Rhythm Zone; Formats: digital download	—	—	—		
Summer of Love	Released: July 22, 2015; Label: Rhythm Zone; Formats: CD, CD/DVD, CD/Blu-ray, digital download	7	—	—	JPN: 23,000	
Winter of Love	Released: January 20, 2016; Label: Rhythm Zone; Formats: CD, CD/DVD, CD/Blu-ray, digital download	2	—	—	JPN: 30,000	
My Name Is...	Released: September 11, 2020; Label: Rhythm Zone; Formats: CD, CD/DVD, CD/Blu-ray	—	—	—		
Best: 2000-2020	Released: December 6, 2021; Label: Rhythm Zone; Formats: CD, CD/DVD, CD/Blu-ray	16	—	—	JPN: 15,000	
Live in Metaverse: The Best	Released: March 26, 2025; Label: Rhythm Zone; Formats: CD, CD/DVD, CD/Blu-ray	24	—	—	JPN: 3,199	

=== Remix albums ===
List of albums, with selected chart positions
Title	Album details	Peak positions			Sales (JPN)	Certifications
Title	Album details	JPN	TWN (Note: Week references for G-Music: Driving Hits 2009 week 13, Driving Hits 3 2011 week 19, Beach Mix 2012 week 31, Driving Hits 6 2014 week 13.)	TWN East Asia	Sales (JPN)	Certifications
Koda Kumi Remix Album	Released: February 22, 2006; Label: Rhythm Zone; Formats: Digital download	—	—	—		
Koda Kumi Driving Hit's	Released: March 25, 2009; Label: Rhythm Zone; Formats: CD, digital download	6	—	11	JPN: 66,000	RIAJ: Gold
Koda Kumi Driving Hit's 2	Released: March 31, 2010; Label: Rhythm Zone; Formats: CD, digital download	5	—	—	JPN: 43,000	
Koda Kumi Driving Hit's 3	Released: May 4, 2011; Label: Rhythm Zone; Formats: CD, digital download	6	—	16	JPN: 28,000	
Koda Kumi Driving Hit's 4	Released: March 14, 2012; Label: Rhythm Zone; Formats: CD, digital download	13	—	—	JPN: 15,000	
Beach Mix	Released: August 1, 2012; Label: Rhythm Zone; Formats: CD, CD/DVD, Playbutton, digital download	4	—	14	JPN: 36,000	
Koda Kumi Driving Hit's 5	Released: March 20, 2013; Label: Rhythm Zone; Formats: CD, digital download	19	—	—	JPN: 10,000	
Koda Kumi Driving Hit's 6	Released: March 19, 2014; Label: Rhythm Zone; Formats: CD, CD/DVD, digital download	19	—	11	JPN: 9,000	
Koda Kumi Driving Hit's 7	Released: April 5, 2017; Label: Rhythm Zone; Formats: CD, digital download	18	—	—	JPN: 5,000	
Koda Kumi Driving Hit's 8	Released: March 28, 2018; Label: Rhythm Zone; Formats: CD, digital download	40	—	—	JPN: 3,051	
Koda Kumi Driving Hit's 9	Released: February 20, 2019; Label: Rhythm Zone; Formats: CD, CD+Goods, digital download	24	—	—	JPN: 3,525	
re(MIX)	Released: March 11, 2020; Label: Rhythm Zone; Formats: CD, CD+Goods, digital download	33	—	—	JPN: 1,231	
KODA KUMI LIVE TOUR 2019 re(LIVE) -Black Cherry- iamSHUM Non-Stop Mix	Released: March 11, 2020; Label: Rhythm Zone; Formats: digital download	—	—	—		
KODA KUMI LIVE TOUR 2019 re(LIVE) -JAPONESQUE- REMO-CON Non-Stop Mix	Released: March 11, 2020; Label: Rhythm Zone; Formats: digital download	—	—	—		
Koda Kumi Driving Hit's 10	Released: October 18, 2025; Label: Rhythm Zone; Formats: digital download	—	—	—		
Koda Kumi Driving Hit's 11	Released: August 28, 2026; Label: Rhythm Zone; Formats: digital download	—	—	—		

=== Live albums ===
Title	Album details
KODA KUMI SPECIAL LIVE "Dirty Ballroom" ~One Night Show~ (10 Songs Version)	Released: March 4, 2009; Label: Rhythm Zone; Formats: digital download
Koda Kumi Live Tour 2011 ~Dejavu~	Released: Marc 14, 2012; Label: Rhythm Zone; Formats: rental CD, digital download
Eternity: Love & Songs at Billboard Live	Released: March 20, 2013; Label: Rhythm Zone; Formats: rental CD, digital download
Live Tour 2008: Kingdom	Released: March 20, 2013; Label: Rhythm Zone; Formats: rental CD, digital download
Live Tour 2009: Trick	Released: March 4, 2009; Label: Rhythm Zone; Formats: rental CD, digital download
Live Tour 2010: Universe	Released: March 20, 2013; Label: Rhythm Zone; Formats: rental CD, digital download
10th Anniversary: Fantasia in Tokyo Dome	Released: March 20, 2013; Label: Rhythm Zone; Formats: rental CD, digital download
Premium Night: Love & Songs	Released: March 20, 2013; Label: Rhythm Zone; Formats: CD, rental CD, digital download
Live Tour 2013: Japonesque	Released: December 4, 2013; Label: Rhythm Zone; Formats: digital download
Hall Tour 2014: Bon Voyage	Released: October 8, 2014; Label: Rhythm Zone; Formats: digital download
Live Tour 2015: Walk of My Life	Released: December 2, 2015; Label: Rhythm Zone; Formats: rental CD, digital download
Live Tour 2016: Best Single Collection	Released: November 16, 2016; Label: Rhythm Zone; Formats: rental CD
Live Tour 2017: W Face	Released: December 6, 2017; Label: Rhythm Zone; Formats: CD, digital download
Koda Kumi Live Tour 2017 - W Face - Set List	Released: December 6, 2017; Label: Rhythm Zone; Formats: digital download
Koda Kumi Fanclub Tour ~AND~ SET LIST	Released: March 28, 2018; Label: Rhythm Zone; Formats: digital download
KODA KUMI LIVE TOUR 2018 ~DNA~ SET LIST	Released: January 1, 2019; Label: Rhythm Zone; Formats: digital download
Koda Kumi Fanclub Tour -AND-	Released: March 20, 2019; Label: Rhythm Zone; Formats: digital download
Live Tour 2018: DNA	Released: March 20, 2019; Label: Rhythm Zone; Formats: rental CD, digital download
KODA KUMI LIVE TOUR 2019 re(LIVE)-JAPONESQUE-	Released: March 11, 2020; Label: Rhythm Zone; Formats: CD, digital download
KODA KUMI LIVE TOUR 2019 re(LIVE) -Black Cherry-	Released: March 11, 2020; Label: Rhythm Zone; Formats: CD, digital download
KODA KUMI Love & Songs 2022	Released: December 6, 2022; Label: Rhythm Zone; Formats: digital download

== Extended plays ==
Title	EP details	Peak positions	Sales
Title	EP details	JPN	Sales
Fever Live In Hall	Released: July 2007; Label: Rhythm Zone; Formats:DVD	11	
Fever Live In Hall II	Released: July 2009; Label: Rhythm Zone; Formats:CD+DVD	—	
Gossip Candy	Released: July 7, 2010; Label: Rhythm Zone; Formats: CD/DVD	11	JPN: 84,000
Love Romance (Note: Extended play limited to 50 copies compiling the songs and videos featured in her Pachinko game of the same title.)	Released: April 16, 2012; Label: Rhythm Zone; Formats: CD/DVD	—	
Fever: Legend Live (Note: Extended play limited to 400 copies compiling the songs and videos featured in her Pachinko game of the same title.)	Released: August 20, 2014; Label: Rhythm Zone; Formats: CD/DVD	—	
Angel	Released: December 2, 2020; Label: Rhythm Zone; Formats: CD, digital download	123	JPN: 442
Monster	Released: December 2, 2020; Label: Rhythm Zone; Formats: CD, digital download	129	JPN: 428
Angel + Monster	Released: December 2, 2020; Label: Rhythm Zone; Formats: CD, 2CD/DVD, digital download	12	JPN: 7,000
Wings	Released: January 18, 2023; Label: Rhythm Zone; Formats: CD, CD/DVD, CD/2DVD, CD/Blu-ray, digital download	10	JPN: 4,340
De-CODE	Released: August 13, 2025; Label: Rhythm Zone; Formats: CD/DVD, CD/Blu-ray, digital download	28	

== Singles ==
=== As a lead artist ===
==== 2000s ====
List of singles, with selected chart positions
Title	Year	Peak chart positions			Sales (JPN)	Certifications	Album
Title	Year	JPN	JPN Hot (Note: The Japan Hot 100 was established in February 2008.) (Note: Sources for chart positions are as follows: "Koi no Tsubomi", "Anytime", "Moon Crying", "Taboo", "Stay with Me", "It's All Love", "Lick Me", "Alive", "Physical Thing", "Can We Go Back", "Superstar", Gossip Candy, "Lollipop", "Suki de Suki de Suki de", "Pop Diva", "Poppin' Love Cocktail", "Ai o Tomenaide", "Love Me Back", "Go to the Top", "Koishikute", "Pink Spider", "Lalalalala", "Summer Trip", "Dreaming Now", "Hotel", "Walk of My Life", "Trust・Last")	TWN East Asia (Note: G-Music positions refer to the combined albums and physical singles chart.) (Note: Week references for G-Music: "Moon" 2005 week 27, "Taboo" 2008 week 41, "Stay with Me" 2008 week 52, "It's All Love" 2009 week 14, "3 Splash" 2009 week 28, "Alive/Physical Thing" 2009 week 40.)	Sales (JPN)	Certifications	Album
"Take Back"	2000	59	—	—	23,000		Affection
"Trust Your Love"	2001	18	—	—	42,000		Affection
"Color of Soul"	2001	29	—	—	13,000		Affection
"So into You"	2002	50	—	—	6,000		Affection
"Love Across the Ocean"	2002	19	—	—	22,000		Grow Into One
"Maze"	2002	25	—	—	13,000		Grow Into One
"Real Emotion"	2003	3	—	—	282,000	RIAJ (physical): Gold; RIAJ (digital): Gold	Grow Into One
"1000 no Kotoba" (1000の言葉, Sen no Kotoba; "1000 Words")	2003	3	—	—	282,000	RIAJ (digital): Gold	Grow Into One
"Come with Me"	2003	14	—	—	41,000		Feel My Mind
"Gentle Words"	2003	15	—	—	27,000		Feel My Mind
"Crazy 4 U"	2004	12	—	—	28,000	RIAJ (digital): Gold	Feel My Mind
Love & Honey (Note: Marketed exclusively as a single, Love & Honey featured four original songs associated with the 2004 film revival of Cutie Honey, and was primarily promoted by "Cutie Honey".)	2004	4	—	—	151,000	RIAJ (physical): Gold	Feel My Mind
"Chase"	2004	18	—	—	22,000		Secret
"Kiseki" (奇跡; "Miracle")	2004	7	—	—	60,000		Secret
"Hands"	2005	7	—	—	49,000	RIAJ (ringtone): 2× Platinum; RIAJ (digital): Gold	Secret
"Hot Stuff" (featuring KM-Markit)	2005	10	—	—	30,000		Secret
"Butterfly"	2005	2	—	—	126,000	RIAJ (ringtone): 3× Platinum; RIAJ (cellphone): Platinum; RIAJ (physical): Gold	Best: First Things
"Flower"	2005	4	—	—	106,000	RIAJ (ringtone): 2× Platinum; RIAJ (physical): Gold	Best: First Things
"Promise"	2005	4	—	—	62,000	RIAJ (ringtone): 2× Platinum; RIAJ (cellphone): Gold; RIAJ (physical): Gold	Best: First Things
"Star"	2005	4	—	—	62,000	RIAJ (physical): Gold	Best: First Things
"You"	2005	1	—	—	190,000	RIAJ (ringtone): 3× Platinum; RIAJ (cellphone): Platinum; RIAJ (physical): Gold	Best: Second Session
"Birthday Eve"	2005	6	—	—	48,000		Best: Second Session
"DDD" (featuring Soulhead)	2005	5	—	—	48,000		Best: Second Session
"Shake It Up"	2005	6	—	—	47,000		Best: Second Session
"Lies"	2006	7	—	—	47,000	RIAJ (cellphone): Gold	Best: Second Session
"Feel"	2006	1	—	—	48,000		Best: Second Session
"Candy" (featuring Mr. Blistah)	2006	3	—	—	48,000		Best: Second Session
"No Regret"	2006	4	—	—	131,000	RIAJ (ringtone): 2× Platinum; RIAJ (cellphone): Platinum; RIAJ (physical): Gold	Best: Second Session
"Ima Sugu Hoshii" (今すぐ欲しい; "I Want You Right Now")	2006	5	—	—	47,000		Best: Second Session
"Kamen" ("Mask") (featuring Tatsuya Ishii)	2006	3	—	—	47,000		Best: Second Session
"Wind"	2006	3	—	—	47,000	RIAJ (ringtone): 2× Platinum; RIAJ (cellphone): Gold	Best: Second Session
"Someday"	2006	3	—	—	89,000	RIAJ (ringtone): 3× Platinum; RIAJ (cellphone): Platinum; RIAJ (physical): Gold	Best: Second Session
"Boys & Girls"	2006	3	—	—	89,000	RIAJ (physical): Gold	Non-album single
"Koi no Tsubomi" (恋のつぼみ; "Bud of Love")	2006	2	73 (Note: Charted in 2010.)	—	273,000	RIAJ (ringtone): 2× Million; RIAJ (cellphone): Platinum; RIAJ (physical): Platinum	Black Cherry
4 Hot Wave (Note: Marketed as a single, 4 Hot Wave featured four A-side compositions: "I'll Be There", "Ningyo-hime", "Juicy" and "With Your Smile".)	2006	2	—	—	489,000	RIAJ (physical): Platinum	Black Cherry
"Yume no Uta" (夢のうた; "Dream Song")	2006	1	—	—	301,000	RIAJ (ringtone): Million; RIAJ (cellphone): Platinum; RIAJ (physical): Platinum	Black Cherry
"Futari de..." (ふたりで…; "Together...")	2006	1	—	—	301,000	RIAJ (ringtone): 2× Platinum; RIAJ (cellphone): Gold; RIAJ (physical): Platinum	Non-album single
"Cherry Girl"	2006	3	—	—	100,000	RIAJ (ringtone): 2× Platinum; RIAJ (digital): Gold; RIAJ (physical): Gold	Black Cherry
"Unmei" (運命; "Fate")	2006	3	—	—	100,000	RIAJ (ringtone): Million; RIAJ (cellphone): Platinum; RIAJ (physical): Gold	Black Cherry
"But"	2007	2	—	—	129,000	RIAJ (ringtone): 3× Platinum; RIAJ (cellphone): Platinum; RIAJ (physical): Gold	Kingdom
"Aishō" (愛証; "Proof of Love")	2007	2	—	—	129,000	RIAJ (digital): Platinum; RIAJ (physical): Gold	Kingdom
"Freaky"	2007	1	—	—	195,000	RIAJ (physical): Platinum; RIAJ (digital): Gold	Kingdom
"Ai no Uta" (愛のうた; "Love Song")	2007	2	—	—	136,000	RIAJ (ringtone): Million; RIAJ (download): Million; RIAJ (physical): Gold; RIAJ (streaming): Platinum	Kingdom
"Last Angel" (featuring Tohoshinki)	2007	3	—	—	90,000	RIAJ (cellphone): Gold; RIAJ (physical): Gold	Kingdom
"Anytime"	2008	4	4	—	53,000	RIAJ (ringtone): 3× Platinum; RIAJ (cellphone): Platinum	Kingdom
Moon (Note: Marketed as a single, Moon was promoted by the compositions "Moon Crying" and "That Ain't Cool", featuring American single Fergie.)	2008	2	—	9	141,000	RIAJ (physical): Gold	Trick
"Taboo"	2008	1	2	6	88,000	RIAJ (digital): Platinum; RIAJ (physical): Gold	Trick
"Stay with Me"	2008	1	1	11	66,000	RIAJ (ringtone): 2× Platinum; RIAJ (digital): Platinum; RIAJ (physical): Gold	Trick
"It's All Love!" (Koda Kumi x Misono)	2009	1	1	12	99,000	RIAJ (cellphone): Platinum; RIAJ (physical): Gold	Universe
3 Splash (Note: Marketed as a single, 3 Splash was promoted by the compositions "Lick Me", "Ecstasy" and "Hashire!".)	2009	2	—	8	93,000	RIAJ (physical): Gold	Universe
"Alive"	2009	1	4	12	45,000		Universe
"Physical Thing"	2009	1	90	12	45,000		Universe

==== 2010s ====
List of singles, with selected chart positions
Title	Year	Peak chart positions			Sales (JPN)	Certifications	Album
Title	Year	JPN	JPN Hot	TWN East Asia (Note: Week references for G-Music: "Can We Go Back" 2010 week 4, "Gossip Candy" 2010 week 29, "Suki de Suki de Suki de/Anata Dake ga" 2010 week 39, "4 Times" 2011 week 34, "Ai o Tomenaide" 2011 week 39, "Love Me Back" 2011 week 49, "Summer Trip" 2013 week 31, "Hotel" 2014 week 33.)	Sales (JPN)	Certifications	Album
"Can We Go Back"	2010	2	6	11	37,000		Universe
"Suki de, Suki de, Suki de." (好きで、好きで、好きで。; "Love Love Love")	2010	2	2	7	85,000	RIAJ (digital): 2× Platinum; RIAJ (physical): Gold	Dejavu
"Anata Dake ga" (あなただけが; "Only You")	2010	2	—	7	85,000	RIAJ (digital): Platinum; RIAJ (physical): Gold	Dejavu
"Pop Diva"	2011	4	11	—	40,000	RIAJ (digital): Gold	Dejavu
4 Times (Note: Marketed as a single, 4 Times was promoted by the compositions "Poppin' Love Cocktail" featuring rapper Teeda, "In the Air", "VIP" and "Ko-so-ko-so".)	2011	6	—	11	74,000		Japonesque
"Ai o Tomenaide" (愛を止めないで; "Don't Stop the Love")	2011	6	7	6	44,000	RIAJ (digital): Platinum	Japonesque
"Love Me Back"	2011	6	9	15	44,000	RIAJ (digital): Gold	Japonesque
"Go to the Top"	2012	1	10	—	69,000	RIAJ (physical): Gold	Bon Voyage
"Koishikute" (恋しくて; "Beloved")	2012	7	8	—	24,000	RIAJ (digital): Gold	Bon Voyage
Summer Trip (Note: Marketed as a single, Summer Trip was promoted by the compositions "Lalalalala", "Touch Down", and "Is This Trap?".)	2013	6	45	9	23,000		Bon Voyage
"Dreaming Now!"	2013	9	33	—	26,000		Bon Voyage
"Hotel"	2014	7	23	10	22,000		Walk of My Life
"Dance in the Rain"	2014	—	— (Note: Charted at number 54 on the Adult Contemporary Airplay chart.)	—			Walk of My Life
"Shhh!"	2016	—	—	—			Non-album single
"Lit"	2017	—	—	—			And
"Hush"	2017	—	—	—			DNA
"Never Enough"	2017	—	—	—			And
"Eh Yo"	2019	—	—	—			re(CORD)
"Summer Time"	2019	—	—	—			re(CORD)
"Do Me"	2019	—	—	—			re(CORD)
"Goldfinger 2019"	2019	—	—	—			re(CORD)
"Put Your Hands Up!!!"	2019	—	—	—			re(CORD)
"OMG"	2019	—	—	—			re(CORD)
"Strip"	2019	—	—	—			re(CORD)
"Get Naked"	2019	—	—	—			re(CORD)
"Again"	2019	—	—	—			re(CORD)

==== 2020s ====
List of singles, with selected chart positions
Title	Year	Peak chart positions			Sales (JPN)	Certifications	Album
Title	Year	JPN	JPN Hot	TWN East Asia (Note: Week references for G-Music: "Can We Go Back" 2010 week 4, "Gossip Candy" 2010 week 29, "Suki de Suki de Suki de/Anata Dake ga" 2010 week 39, "4 Times" 2011 week 34, "Ai o Tomenaide" 2011 week 39, "Love Me Back" 2011 week 49, "Summer Trip" 2013 week 31, "Hotel" 2014 week 33.)	Sales (JPN)	Certifications	Album
"Puff"	2020	—	—	—			Angel + Monster
"Lucky Star"	2020	—	—	—			Angel + Monster
"XXKK"	2020	—	—	—			Angel + Monster
"I'm Lovin'"	2020	—	—	—			Angel + Monster
"Killer Monster"	2020	—	—	—			Angel + Monster
"Run"	2020	—	—	—			Angel + Monster
Summer of '21 (Note: Marketed as a single, Summer of '21 was promoted by the compositions "We'll Be Ok", "Doo-Bee-Doo-Bop", and "To Be Free".)	2021	—	—	—			Heart
"4 More"	2021	—	—	—			Heart
"100 no kodoku-tachi e" (100のコドク達へ)"	2021	—	—	—			Heart
"Wings"	2022	—	—	—			Wings
"Trust・Last" (Koda Kumi x Shōnan no Kaze)	2022	7	43	—	23,000		Non-album singles
"Black Wings"	2023	—	—	—			Non-album singles
"Let's Fight for Love!"	2023	—	—	—			UNICORN
"Tōi Machi no Doko ka de..." (遠い街のどこかで…, Somewhere in a faraway city...)	2023	—	—	—			UNICORN
"So Fever"	2023	—	—	—			Best: 2000-2020
"Never Give It Up"	2023	—	—	—			Best: 2000-2020
"Vroom"	2023	—	—	—			UNICORN
"Silence"	2024	—	—	—			UNICORN
"Dangerously"	2024	—	— (Note: Charted at number 60 on the Download Songs chart.)	—			Non-album singles
"This weekend"	2024	—	—	—			Non-album singles
"ChaO!"	2025	—	—	—			De-CODE
"Megumi No Hito" (め組のひと; "Best Of Me")	2025	—	—	—		RIAJ (digital): Gold	Eternity: Love & Songs
"Wine Red no Kokoro" (ワインレッドの心; "Heart of Red Wine")	2025	—	—	—			Eternity: Love & Songs

=== As a collaborating artist ===
List of singles, with selected chart positions
Title	Year	Peak chart positions		Sales (JPN)	Certifications	Album
Title	Year	JPN	JPN Hot	Sales (JPN)	Certifications	Album
"The Meaning of Peace" (Koda Kumi and BoA)	2001	12	—	67,000		Song Nation
"Switch" (Lisa featuring Koda Kumi and Heartsdales)	2004	43	—	7,000		Gratitude
"Just Go" (JHETT featuring Koda Kumi)	2005	84	—	2,000		Jhett
"XXX" (Soulhead featuring Koda Kumi)	2006	22	—	13,000		Naked
"Won't Be Long" (Exile & Koda Kumi)	2006	2	—	236,000	RIAJ (ringtone): Million; RIAJ (digital): Platinum; RIAJ (physical): Platinum	Black Cherry / Exile Evolution
"Ashita Waratteirareru Yō ni" (明日笑っていられるように; "To Be Able to Laugh Tomorrow") (Tokyo Purin to Taisetsu na Nakama-tachi (東京プリンとたいせつな仲間たち; "Tokyo Pudding and Dear Friends"))	2014	97	— (Note: Charted at number 98 on the Hot Singles Sales chart.)	900		non-album singles
"WON'T BE LONG -2019- " (EXILE ATSUSHI × Koda Kumi featuring EXILE MAKIDAI)	2019	—	—	—		non-album singles
"OSAKA TOKYO" (オーサカトーキョー; "Osaka Tokyo") (EXILE ATSUSHI × Koda Kumi)	2020	—	—	—		40 ~forty~
"My Hero ~ kiseki no uta 〜" (My Hero〜奇跡の唄〜; "My Hero ~ Miracle Song ~") (with various)	2021	—	—	—		Pediatric Cancer Treatment Support Charity Live Theme Song
"Jump to the Breeze" (Koda Kumi with TETSUYA KOMURO )	2024	—	— (Note: Charted at number 72 on the Download Songs Sales chart.)	—		Non-album single

=== Promotional singles ===
List of promotional singles, with selected chart positions
Title	Year	Chart peaks	Certifications	Album
Title	Year	JPN Hot	Certifications	Album
"Cutie Honey" (キューティーハニー, Kyūtī Hanī)	2004	—	RIAJ (ringtone): 3× Platinum; RIAJ (cellphone): Gold	Feel My Mind / Love & Honey (single) / Secret
"Get It On"	2006	—		Non-album single
"I'll Be There"	2006	—	RIAJ (ringtone): 3× Platinum	4 Hot Wave (single)
"Ningyo-hime" (人魚姫; "Mermaid Princess")	2006	—	RIAJ (cellphone): Gold	4 Hot Wave (single)
"Juicy"	2006	—		4 Hot Wave (single)
"With Your Smile"	2006	—		4 Hot Wave (single)
"Girls"	2007	—	RIAJ (cellphone): Gold	"Freaky" (single)
"Moon Crying"	2008	3	RIAJ (ringtone): 3× Platinum; RIAJ (digital): 3× Platinum	Moon (single) / Trick
"That Ain't Cool" (featuring Fergie)	2008	—		Moon (single) / Trick
"Once Again"	2008	—		Moon (single)
"Lady Go!"	2008	—		Moon (single)
"Lick Me"	2009	2	RIAJ (digital): Platinum	3 Splash (single) / Universe
"Ecstasy"	2009	—		3 Splash (single) / Universe
"Hashire!" (走れ！; "Run!")	2009	—		3 Splash (single) / Universe
"Superstar"	2010	86		Universe
"Lollipop"	2010	31	RIAJ (digital): Platinum	Gossip Candy (single) / Dejavu
"Inside Fishbowl"	2010	—		Gossip Candy (single)
"Outside Fishbowl"	2010	—		Gossip Candy (single)
"Be My Baby"	2010	—		Eternity ~Love & Songs~
"Hey Baby!"	2010	—		Dejavu
"Poppin' Love Cocktail" (featuring Teeda)	2011	6	RIAJ (digital): Gold	4 Times (single) / Japonesque
"In the Air"	2011	—		4 Times (single) / Japonesque
"VIP"	2011	—		4 Times (single) / Japonesque
"Ko-so-ko-so" ("Stealthily")	2011	—		4 Times (single) / Japonesque
"Boom Boom Boys"	2012	—		Japonesque
"Brave"	2012	—		Japonesque
"Escalate"	2012	—		Japonesque
"No Man's Land"	2012	—		Japonesque
"Slow" (featuring Omarion)	2012	—		Japonesque
"So Nice" (featuring Mr. Blistah)	2012	—		Japonesque
"Whatchu Waitin' On?"	2012	—		Beach Mix
"Lovely" (ラブリー, Raburii)	2013	—		Color the Cover
"Shake Hip!"	2013	—		Color the Cover
"Pink Spider" (ピンク スパイダー, Pinku Supaidā)	2013	56		Color the Cover
"Lalalalala"	2013	23		Summer Trip (single) / Bon Voyage
"Touch Down"	2013	—		Summer Trip (single) / Bon Voyage
"Is This Trap?"	2013	—		Summer Trip (single)
"Show Me Your Holla"	2014	—		Bon Voyage
"Walk of My Life"	2015	41		Walk of My Life
"Ex Tape"	2015	—		Summer of Love
"On and On"	2016	— (Note: Charted at number 37 on the Radio Songs sub-chart.)		Winter of Love
"Cutie Honey (Best: 2000-2020 version)" (キューティーハニー Best～2000-2020～ version)"	2021	—		Best: 2000-2020
"Change my future"	2023	—		Non-album single
"Trigger"	2023	—		WINGS

== Other charted songs ==
List of non-promotional songs that have received certifications
Title	Year	Certifications	Album
"Saigo no Ame" (最後の雨; "Last Rain")	2003	RIAJ (digital): Gold	"Gentle Words" (single)
"Rain"	2004	RIAJ (digital): Gold	Feel My Mind
"Taisetsu na Kimi e" (大切な君へ; "To You, My Precious")	2005	RIAJ (cellphone): Gold	"Butterfly" (single)
"Candle Light"	2006	RIAJ (digital): Gold	Black Cherry
"Ienai Yo" (言えないよ; "Can't Say")	2010	RIAJ (digital): Gold	Eternity ~Love & Songs~

== Other appearances ==
List of non-studio album or guest appearances that feature Koda Kumi, including the collaborations that were compiled on Out Works & Collaboration Best (2009)
Title	Year	Album
"Be Mine"	2003	99% Radio Show
"Every-After-Party" (Rather Unique featuring Koda Kumi)	2003	99% Radio Show
"Rainy Day" (KM-Markit featuring Koda Kumi)	2005	Vivid
"Super Sonic" (Koda Kumi & D.I)	2005	573: A40 Records Special Compilation Album
"Joy" (TRF meets Koda Kumi)	2006	Lif-e-motions
"Everybody" (Shingo Katori featuring Koda Kumi)	2006	Pop Up! SMAP
"Twinkle" (Show Lo featuring Koda Kumi, English Version)	2006	Speshow
"Twinkle" (Japanese Version)	2006	Amazing Nuts!
"Simple & Lovely" (M-Flo loves Koda Kumi)	2007	Cosmicolor
"Simple & Lovely (Buzzer Beats Remix)" (M-Flo loves Koda Kumi)	2007	Electricolor: Complete Remix
"Make It Bump" (Far East Movement featuring Koda Kumi)	2010	Free Wired (Japanese Edition)
"Stands Up!" (Clench & Blistah featuring Koda Kumi)	2011	Love & Message
"It's So Delicious"	2014	Watashi to Dorikamu: Dreams Come True 25th Best Covers
"Wanderin' Destiny"	2015	#globe20th -SPECIAL COVER BEST-
"Soba ni Ite"	2017	Thank You Disney
"EMPEROR - We on Fire!" (Paradox Live Akan Yatsura featuring Koda Kumi)	2020	Paradox Live Exhibition Show -Akan Yatsura-
"I Remember"	2021	SPEED 25th Anniversary TRIBUTE ALBUM "SPEED SPIRITS"
"One Night Carnival"	2022	All Night Carnival

== See also ==
- Koda Kumi videography
