= 10th Anniversary: Fantasia in Tokyo Dome =

Video by Koda Kumi
- Released: 18 March 2011 (DVD and Blu-ray); 20 March 2013 (rental live CD)
- Recorded: 2011
- Genre: Pop, R&B, J-pop, dance-pop
- Label: Rhythm Zone
- Producer: Koda Kumi

Koda Kumi chronology
Eternity: Love & Songs at Billboard Live (2011)	10th Anniversary: Fantasia in Tokyo Dome (2011)	Live Tour 2011: Dejavu (2012)

10th Anniversary: Fantasia in Tokyo Dome (stylized as KODA KUMI 10th Anniversary ～FANTASIA～ in TOKYO DOME) is the 11th live DVD released by Japanese singer Koda Kumi, released on March 18, 2011.

== Information ==
On December 5, 2010, Koda Kumi held a concert to celebrate 10 years as an artist and showcased 46 songs. This was her second performance at Tokyo Dome - her first being her Black Cherry Tour.

The DVD includes a 30-minute making video and backstage footage at Tokyo Dome Live. The limited edition DVD came with a replica staff pass, which mimicked the passes used by the tour staff.

== Track listing ==
=== DVD1 ===
1. "Butterfly"
2. "show girl"
3. "Cherry Girl"
4. "Ima Sugu Hoshii"
5. "Lollipop"
6. "Crazy 4 U"
  <Interlude Movie 1>
7. "Selfish"
8. "Ningyo-hime"
9. "We Will Rock You / real Emotion / BUT / Freaky"
  <Interlude Movie 2>
10. "Ai no Uta"
11. "Rain / Promise / Anata Dake ga / come back"
12. "0-ji Mae no Tsunderella"
13. "Take Back"
14. "Moon Crying"
15. "Ai no Kotoba"
  <Interlude Movie 3>
16. "Koi no Tsubomi"
17. "Inside Fishbowl"
18. "Gentle Words"
19. "Someday"
20. "Lick me♥"

=== DVD2 ===
<Encore>

1. "Be My Baby"
2. "Megumi no Hito"
3. "Universe"
4. "Dance Part"
5. "It's all Love!"
  <Double Encore>
6. "Come With Me / Lady Go! / So Into You / Won't Be Long / Taboo / Trust Your Love / Chase / Cutie Honey / No Regret / love across the ocean / Come Over
7. "Suki de, Suki de, Suki de."
8. "Wind"
9. "walk"
10. "Bonus Pictures from Tokyo Dome and Making Video"

== Chart history ==
Chart (2011)	Peak position
Oricon Weekly DVD Top 200	1
