= Best: First Things =

Greatest hits album by Koda Kumi
- Released: September 21, 2005
- Recorded: 2000–2005
- Genre: Pop; R&B
- Label: Rhythm Zone
- Producer: Max Matsuura

Koda Kumi chronology
Secret (2005)	Best: First Things (2005)	Koda Kumi Remix Album (2006)

Alternative cover
- CD+DVD cover

Singles from Best: First Things
- 1. "Butterfly" Released: June 22, 2005; 2. "Flower" Released: August 10, 2005; 3. "Promise/Star" Released: September 7, 2005

Best: First Things (stylised as Best ~first things~) is the debut greatest hits album by Japanese singer Koda Kumi. Rhythm Zone released it in a variety of formats on September 21, 2005. The album is divided into two discs, each containing a single released by Koda between her 2000 debut with "Take Back" and her most recent single, "Hot Stuff" in 2005. The second disc contains four new singles: "Butterfly", "Flower", "Promise", and "Star", as well as a bonus track, the solo version of "The Meaning of Peace".

CDJournal, a Japanese music magazine, praised Best: First Things for highlighting Koda's musical repertoire and vocal performance. It debuted at number one on the Oricon Albums Chart and charted for more than 150 weeks. The Recording Industry Association of Japan (RIAJ) certified the album double million for exceeding two million units sold, and holds as Koda's best-selling album. Before embarking on her 2005 First Things concert tour in Japan, Koda hosted a special event at Shibuya Station in which fans recreated the dress she wore on the album's cover.

== Content and release ==
Best: First Things is Koda's first greatest hits album, including all of her singles from "Take Back" (2000) to her most recent single, "Hot Stuff" with KM-Markit. The decision to release this album was made at the suggestion of the staff. Koda herself said that the release of a best album was not in her mind at the time and that she did not realize that 18 singles had been released so far. She said in an interview at the time of the release that she wanted people to enjoy listening to her old songs and to know the old Kumi Koda as well. Looking back on her activities, Koda stated that this greatest hits album is not a milestone, but that the timing of its release was right. Rena Koyanagi remastered each song on Best: First Things, which was executive produced by Max Matsuura. The album is divided into two discs and has a total of 23 songs. The first disc includes a new song called "No Tricks," and the second disc includes four new singles: "Butterfly", "Flower", "Promise", and "Star", as well as a bonus track, the solo version of "The Meaning of Peace."

Rhythm Zone released Best: First Things in a variety of formats on September 21, 2005. The standard release included two discs of material and came in a large jewel case. The DVD version included music videos for all of the album's songs except "No Tricks," "1000 no Kotoba," "Flower," and "Star." First-press DVD editions included a promotional video for Best: First Things, while standard first-press editions included a slipcase and an additional booklet. Rhythm Zone later distributed the album across Asia, including China, South Korea, and Taiwan.

== Promotion ==
On the eve of the release of the best collection, a huge poster with Koda's cleavage exposed was displayed in front of the glass curtain wall of the Q-FRONT building in Tokyo's Shibuya Station. A special event was held to find five of the 30 spots where Koda's signature posters were hidden in the neighborhood and enter a drawing for a chance to win specially made idol merchandise. On September 21, 2005, Koda held a cosplay event at Shibuya Station to promote the album, with fans replicating the dress she wore on the cover; winners received either a signed copy of the album or Kumi's debut concert DVD, Secret First Class Limited Live (2005). Before the release of the album, Koda said she would be a club Mama-san for a day if the album could break the one million sales mark. Later, after the album surpassed one million sales, a one-day “Club Koda” was held at a club in Ginza on November 25, 2005, where Koda as a Mama-san entertained 100 guests, including three fans. To support the album, Koda went on to tour throughout Japan with her First Things concert tour in 2005. The tour was recorded at Osaka-jō Hall and released as a live DVD on September 13, 2006.

=== Singles and other songs ===
Kumi Koda promoting Best: First Things at Shibuya Station with fans cosplaying the dress she wore on the cover of the album.

On June 22, 2005, Rhythm Zone released the lead single "Butterfly" to promote the album. The single's physical and digital editions include the B-sides "Your Sunshine" and "Taisetsu na kimi e," as well as instrumental versions and a music video for "Butterfly". The single was commercially successful, peaking at number two on the Oricon Singles Chart. The Recording Industry Association of Japan (RIAJ) certified it in three categories: triple platinum for over 750,000 ringtone downloads, platinum for over 250,000 cellphone downloads, and gold for more than 100,000 units sold in Japan.

"Flower" was released as the album's second single on August 10, 2005. The single's physical and digital versions contain both an acoustic and instrumental version of the song. The single achieved commercial success, peaking at number four on the Oricon Singles Chart. The RIAJ certified it twice: gold for 100,000 physical units and double platinum for 500,000 ringtone downloads.

On September 7, 2005, "Promise" and "Star" were released as a double A-side, becoming the third and final single from the album. Each track and its instrumental version are available in physical and digital formats, along with a DVD containing music videos for both songs. The single achieved commercial success, peaking at number four on the Oricon Singles Chart. The single was certified gold by the RIAJ, and "Promise" sold over 500,000 ringtone and 100,000 cellphone downloads.

== Reception ==
Professional ratings
Review scores
Source	Rating
CDJournal	(positive)

CDJournal, a Japanese music publication, praised Best: First Things for highlighting Koda's music catalogue and vocal performance, calling the album "gorgeous". The album and its content have received numerous accolades since its release; Koda won her first award at the 47th Japan Record Awards for "Butterfly" on December 31, 2005, and was awarded the Triple Crown at the Japan Gold Disc Awards on March 10, 2006, for winning three awards: Pop Artist of the Year, Pop Album of the Year for Best: First Things, and Music Video of the Year for "Butterfly". She won Best Female Video and Video of the Year for "Butterfly" at the 2006 MTV Video Music Awards Japan.

Best: First Things achieved commercial success in Japan. The album debuted at number two on the Oricon Albums Chart, selling 558,916 copies in its first week, being blocked from number one by Mr. Children's I ♥ U. The album topped the chart the following week, selling 195,290 copies on its second charting week, making it her first number-one album. It became the sixth best-selling album in Japan in 2005, selling over 1.207 million copies, and was the highest-selling album of the year for a female artist. The album went on to sell an additional 642,842 copies in 2006 making it the seventeenth best-selling album of that year. The Recording Industry Association of Japan (RIAJ) certified the album double million for sales exceeding two million units in April 2006, making it her highest-selling album to date. According to Oricon, Best: First Things has sold 1,916,661 copies across Japan.

Koda revealed in her lifestyle book Koda Reki (2011) that the Best: First Things era, as well as her experiences throughout 2005, were her career highlights, thanking her family and fans for emphasising Koda's Ero-Kawaii aesthetic, which was noted in various Japanese publications at the time.

== Track listing ==
Disc one track list
No.	Title	Lyrics	Music	Length
1.	"No Tricks"	Kumi Koda; Daisuke "D.I" Imai	Daisuke Imai	4:31
2.	"Take Back"	Koda	Kazuhito Kikuchi	4:55
3.	"Trust Your Love"	Koda	Kikuchi	4:27
4.	"Color of Soul"	Natsumi Watanabe	Miki Watanabe	4:28
5.	"So Into You"	Koda	Yasuhiro Abe	4:32
6.	"Love Across the Ocean"	Koda	Tsukasa	3:37
7.	"Maze"	Kenn Kato	Hiroo Yamaguchi	4:04
8.	"Real Emotion"	Kenn Kato	Kazuhiro Hara	3:59
9.	"1000 no Kotoba"	Kazushige Nojima	Noriko Matsueda; Takahito Eguchi	5:58
10.	"Come With Me"	Koda	h-wonder	4:46
11.	"Gentle Words"	Kenn Kato	D.A.I	3:44
12.	"Crazy 4 U"	Miki Watanabe	Miki Watanabe	4:06

Disc two track list
No.	Title	Lyrics	Music	Length
1.	"Cutie Honey"	Kurodo Q.	Takeo Watanabe	3:06
2.	"Chase"	Koda; Hara	Hara	4:58
3.	"Kiseki"	Koda; Kosuke Morimoto	Morimoto	4:58
4.	"Selfish"	Miki Watanabe	Watanabe	3:53
5.	"Hands"	Koda	Katsumi Ohnishi	4:25
6.	"Hot Stuff feat. KM-MARKIT"	Koda; KM-Markit	Daisuke Imai	4:06
7.	"Butterfly"	Koda	Watanabe	4:18
8.	"Flower"	Yoshi	Yasuo Ohtani	4:38
9.	"Promise"	Koda	Daisuke Imai	4:47
10.	"Star"	Koda	Kosuke Morimoto	4:05
11.	"The Meaning of Peace"	Tetsuya Komuro	Komuro	5:16

DVD track list
No.	Title	Length
1.	"Take Back" (Music Video)
2.	"Trust Your Love" (Music Video)
3.	"Color Of Soul" (Music Video)
4.	"So Into You" (Music Video)
5.	"Love Across the Ocean" (Music Video)
6.	"Maze" (Music Video)
7.	"Real Emotion" (Music Video)
8.	"Come With Me" (Music Video)
9.	"Gentle Words" (Music Video)
10.	"Crazy 4 U" (Music Video)
11.	"Cutie Honey" (Music Video)
12.	"Chase" (Music Video)
13.	"Kiseki" (Music Video)
14.	"Selfish" (Music Video)
15.	"Hands" (Single Version) (Music Video)
16.	"Hot Stuff feat. KM-Markit" (Music Video)
17.	"Butterfly" (Music Video)
18.	"Promise" (Music Video)
19.	"Special Mix Video from Best: First Things" (First Press Edition Bonus Clip)

== Charts ==
=== Weekly charts ===
Chart (2005–2006)	Peak position
Japanese Albums (Oricon)	1

=== Monthly charts ===
Chart (2005)	Peak position
Japanese Albums (Oricon)	1

=== Year-end charts ===
Chart (2005)	Position
Japanese Albums (Oricon)	6

Chart (2006)	Position
Japanese Albums (Oricon)	17

=== Decade-end charts ===
Chart (2000–2009)	Position
Japanese Albums (Oricon)	25

=== All-time chart ===
Chart	Position
Japanese Albums (Oricon)	83

== Certification and sales ==
Region	Certification	Certified units/sales
Japan (RIAJ)	2× Million	1,916,661

== Release history ==
Region	Date	Format(s)	Label	Ref.
Japan	September 21, 2005	CD; DVD	Rhythm Zone	
China	October–November, 2005	CD; DVD	Rhythm Zone	
South Korea	October–November, 2005	CD; DVD	Rhythm Zone	
Taiwan	October–November, 2005	CD; DVD	Rhythm Zone	
Various	N/A	Digital download; streaming	Rhythm Zone	
