= Secret First Class Limited Live =

Video by Koda Kumi
- Released: 21 September 2005
- Recorded: 2005
- Genre: Pop, R&B, J-pop, dance-pop
- Label: Rhythm Zone
- Producer: Koda Kumi

Koda Kumi chronology
Girls: Selfish (2004)	Secret First Class Limited Live (2005)	Koda Kumi Live Tour 2005: First Things (2006)

Secret First Class Limited Live (stylized as secret ~FIRST CLASS LIMITED LIVE~) DVD is Koda Kumi's first public tour and contains songs from her secret album.

The DVD held its place on the top of "best selling female artist DVD of all time" for four years and eight months, with its total sales of 322,000 copies until August 1, 2011.

Its catalog number is RZBD-45256.

== Track list ==
(Official track list)

1. "Shake It"
2. "Hot Stuff feat. KM-MARKIT"
3. "Single Mix ~Trust Your Love/So Into You/love across the ocean/Gentle Words/m•a•z•e/Come With Me/Chase~
4. "hands"
5. "Kiseki"
6. "Trust You"
7. "Selfish"
8. "Intro ~Get down~"
9. "1000 no Kotoba"
10. "Pearl Moon"
11. "Let's Party"
12. "Cutie Honey"
13. "Love Holic"
14. "Crazy 4 U"
15. "real Emotion"
16. "Take Back"
17. "Butterfly"
18. "walk"
19. "Back Stage Of Secret ~First Class Limited Live~ & Interview With Koda Kumi"

== Chart history ==
Chart (2005)	Peak position
Oricon Weekly DVD Top 200	1
