= Koda Kumi Live Tour 2005: First Things =

Video by Koda Kumi
- Released: 13 September 2006
- Recorded: 2005–2006
- Genre: Pop, R&B, J-pop, dance-pop
- Label: Rhythm Zone
- Producer: Koda Kumi

Koda Kumi chronology
Secret First Class Limited Live (2005)	Koda Kumi Live Tour 2005: First Things (2006)	Koda Kumi Live Tour 2006–2007 Second Session (2007)

Koda Kumi Live Tour 2005: First Things (stylized as KODA KUMI LIVE TOUR 2005 ~first things~ Deluxe Edition) concert DVD was recorded during her corresponding concert tour for her first compilation album, Best ~first things~. It was Kumi Koda's second tour, her first being secret ~First Class Limited Live~, which had been in correspondence of her secret album.

== Information ==
Kumi Koda (known as Koda Kumi in Japan) is a Japanese singer-songwriter from Kyoto and, at the time of the concert's release, was known for urban and R&B genres. The first leg of the tour was originally released on the second DVD to her Best ~second session~ album. The concert DVD, however, contained the full tour, including the encore, along with behind the scenes and an interview with the dancers and Kumi herself. The second DVD also held a digest for her next tour, Live Tour 2006–2007 ~second session~.

The opening video on the first DVD was filmed outside of Osaka-jō Hall near Osaka Castle in Chūō-ku, Osaka.

Limited editions of the DVD included a twelve-page booklet.

== Track list ==
(Official track list)

=== DVD1: Live Tour 2005 ~first things~ ===
0. "Opening movie at OSAKA"

1. "Butterfly"
2. "Cutie Honey"
3. "Chase"
4. "Gentle Words"
5. "Heat feat. MEGARYU"
6. "Hot Stuff feat. KM-MARKIT"
7. "Crazy 4 U"
8. "hands"
9. "No Tricks"
10. "Rain [Unplugged Version]"
11. "Take Back"
12. "m・a・z・e"
13. "Selfish"
14. "Promise"
15. "Star"
16. "Trust Your Love"
17. "Come With Me"
18. "real Emotion"
19. "The Meaning of Peace" (Single Version)
20. "flower"
21. "walk"

=== DVD2: Bonus footage ===
1. "Best ~second session~" live digest release party
  "Candy feat. Mr. Blistah"
  "Someday"
  "feel"
  "Love goes like..."
  "Shake It Up"
  "Wind"
2. "Live Tour 2005 ~first things~" making video
3. "Live Tour 2005 ~first things~" opening video
