= Color of Soul =

Single by Koda Kumi

from the album Affection
- Released: October 3, 2001
- Genre: J-pop; R&B
- Length: N/A
- Label: Rhythm Zone
- Songwriter(s): Natsumi Watanabe, Miki Watabe

Koda Kumi singles chronology
"Trust Your Love" (2001)	"Color of Soul" (2001)	"The Meaning of Peace" (2001)

Music video
- "Color of Soul" on YouTube

Color of Soul is the third Japan single by Japanese artist Koda Kumi. It charted No. 29 on Oricon. The single became her first to contain a booklet with an inlay. It was her first single to not have a North American counterpart, whereas Kumi began to focus solely on the music industry in Japan.

Unlike her first two singles, which carried more elements of rhythm and blues, "Color of Soul" was more pop oriented. The single contained one new song to the accompanying title track, "It's too late." Along with the b-side, two remixes of "Trust Your Love" were also included.

== Information ==
Color of Soul is the third Japan single released by Japanese singer-songwriter Koda Kumi. This made her fifth overall, having had released two singles exclusive to the United States. The single charted low on the Oricon Singles Charts, coming in at No. 29, and remained on the charts for XX consecutive weeks. It became her first single to include a booklet with an inlay. Unlike her first two singles, "Take Back" and "Trust Your Love," "Color of Soul" was never given a release to the North American market, although Kumi had experienced success in the United States with both songs. Kumi later said how she wanted to focus solely on the Japanese market, wanting to become popular in her own country before branching out into other territories.

Despite have a darker cover, the title track became her first song to harbor predominantly elements of pop music, unlike her previous singles which were predominantly rhythm and blues. She used the latter for the single's coupling track "It's too late." Along with "It's too late," the single harbored two remixes of her previous single "Trust Your Love," both which had been unreleased.

"Color of Soul" was written by famous musical composer Miki Watanabe, who has worked with the likes of SMAP, V6, AAA and Yellow Generation. The music for the track was performed by h-wonder, who debuted in 1995 as an artist, but became a composer in 1998. The lyrics to "Color of Soul" were written by lyricist Natsumi Watanabe.

While the music video for "Color of Soul" was released for syndication, a physical release of the video would not become available until Kumi's DVD 7 Spirits, which would be released two years later in 2003, the same day as her second studio album Grow Into One.

Initially, Kumi's then-manager at Avex was going to have the music video be animated due to Kumi being considered "too fat." However, the idea was scrapped on the promise that Kumi would lose enough weight by the time of her next single, So into You.

The single also became her first single to contain image artwork in the booklet.

== Background and composition ==
"Color of Soul" was written by famous musical composer Miki Watanabe, who has worked with the likes of SMAP, V6, AAA and Yellow Generation. Miki would later work with Kumi for her songs "Butterfly" and "Crazy 4 U," among others. The music for the track was performed by h-wonder, who debuted in 1995 as an artist, but became a composer in 1998. Since, he had worked with many avex artists and would continue to work with Kumi well into her later years, even performing the music for Kumi's cover of Linda Yamamoto's song "Dou ni mo Tomaranai" on her 2013 cover album Color the Cover. The lyrics to "Color of Soul" were written by lyricist Natsumi Watanabe, who had worked on the lyrics for some of the music in the Pretty Soldier Sailor Moon anime series throughout the 1990s. Natsumi also worked with South Korean artist BoA on her 2004 studio album Love & Honesty.

== Promotional advertisements ==
"Color of Soul" was used as Nippon TV's AX Music-Factory's theme for their AX Power Play #050.

AX Music-Factory is a music-centered television program in Japan, which is similar to MTV in North America. "AX" comes from the original name JOAX-(D)TV, which started on the Nippon Television Network. JOAX-(D)TV would later become known as AX Music-TV, which hosts the "Factory" program.

== Music video ==
The music video for "Color of Soul," while released for syndication upon the single's release, was later placed on her DVD 7 Spirits.

Due to avex saying Kumi was considered "too fat" at the time of filming, the video was edited to only show her face among fast edits. Her video for "Whatchu Waitin' On?" from her Beach Mix remix album in 2012 was also released showing only her upper body due to Kumi being pregnant at the time.

The theme of the video was to show people around the world. It showed that "everyone has a color of soul," meaning everyone, no matter their color or upbringing, were still part of a whole.

== Background narration ==
"If you keep repeating positive words, your negative thoughts will turn positive!" – Koda Kumi

Koda Kumi's then-manager explained to her that, if she did not lose weight, her next video would be animated. This single – "Color Of Soul" – was her final notice. However, even at the time, Kumi refused to believe she was overweight.

== Track listing ==
(Source)

CD
No.	Title	Lyrics	Music	Arranger(s)	Length
1.	"Color of Soul"	Natsumi Watanabe	Miki Watanabe	H-Wonder	4:28
2.	"It's too late"	Koda Kumi	Tetsurō Oda	H-Wonder	5:55
3.	"Trust Your Love" (Hex Hector Japanese Radio Mix)	Koda Kumi	Kazuhito Kikuchi	Hex Hector	3:09
4.	"Trust Your Love" (Blackwatch Remix)	Koda Kumi	Kazuhito Kikuchi	Blackwatch	5:27
5.	"Color of Soul [Instrumental]" (Instrumental)		Miki Watanabe	h-wonder
6.	"It's too late [Instrumental]" (Instrumental)		Tetsurou Oda	h-wonder

== Charts ==
Chart	Peak position
Oricon Weekly Single 200	29

=== Sales ===
- Initial week estimate: 6,210
- Total estimate: 12,780

== Alternate versions ==
COLOR OF SOUL

1. COLOR OF SOUL: Found on the single and corresponding album affection (2002)
2. COLOR OF SOUL [Instrumental]: Found on the single (2001)
3. COLOR OF SOUL [Dub's GUITAR of SOUL Remix]: Found on single So into You (2002)
4. COLOR OF SOUL [DJ KANBE & Leisure Central Remix]: Found on Koda Kumi Driving Hit's (2009)
