= Best: Bounce & Lovers =

Best ~Bounce & Lovers~

Greatest hits album by Koda Kumi
- Released: March 14, 2007
- Recorded: 2002–2007
- Genre: Pop; R&B
- Label: Rhythm Zone
- Producer: Koda Kumi

Koda Kumi chronology
| Black Cherry (2006) | Best ~Bounce & Lovers~ (2007) | Kingdom (2008) |

Best: Bounce & Lovers (stylized as BEST ~BOUNCE & LOVERS~) is the third compilation album by Japanese singer-songwriter Koda Kumi. The CD contains only ballads and features a track penned by Hideaki Tokunaga, while the DVD features certain music videos re-edited to show only the dancing scenes. It ranked No. 2 on both the Oricon daily and weekly charts, and remained on the charts for twenty-four weeks, despite being a limited release.

== Information ==
Best ~Bounce & Lovers~ is Koda Kumi's third compilation album and was of a limited release. The release coincided with her sixth anniversary since her debut and was released alongside her single But/Aishō, which was also a limited release. It was only released on CD+DVD, with the CD containing only ballads, which had been deemed her best by her fans, while the DVD contained dance versions of her most popular videos.

Several of the ballads placed on the CD had different arrangements, including the "Time Heals" version of "Saigo no Ame" and the "Alternate Orchestra" version of "1000 no Kotoba", which was originally released on her 2003 album Grow into One as a bonus track. It also contained one new song, "Ashite e..." (明日へ... / Towards tomorrow...). The DVD contained one new music video: "Get Up & Move!!", the song which was originally released on her studio album Black Cherry. There was also a tutorial video for the song to teach viewers the dance. The only music video on the DVD to not be a dance version was of So into You, which received a "short version."

The album charted at No. 2 on both the Oricon daily and weekly charts with first week sales of 161,458 copies and has since sold 295,624.

== Packaging ==
Best ~Bounce & Lovers~ was released in two editions:

- CD+DVD: contains fourteen musical tracks and eight videos.
- CD+DVD (First Press Edition): contains fourteen musical tracks and ten videos.

The "first press editions" were released until they became unavailable, in which only the limited CD+DVD editions were available.

== Music videos ==
On the DVD, there were seven music videos and one new music video, "Get Up & Move!!" The other music videos were of past singles, re-edited to show only the dancing. Those music videos included:

- "Crazy 4 U": only the scene from the parking garage was used.
- "Juicy": the dancing scenes in the bar with both Kumi in her lion and rabbit personas were shown.
- "So Into You": this is the only video to be edited as a "short version," which consisted of ninety-seconds of video of Kumi outside of the pagoda.
- "Selfish": the main clip used was of Kumi and the other vampires in the dance hall, along with short clips of Kumi claiming her throne.
- "Candy feat. Mr. Blistah": the three princesses of Kumi were used, with all of the story line from the main single edited out.
- "Hot Stuff feat. KM-MARKIT": KM-MARKIT's physical appearance was not in the video and only the footage of Kumi's crew and the opposing crew in the rink were used.

One of the bonus tracks on the DVD was the tutorial to "Get Up & Move!!"

== Track listing ==
=== CD ===
DISC1: CD
| No. | Title | Lyrics | Music | arrangement | Length |
|---|---|---|---|---|---|
| 1. | "Ashita e... (明日へ... / Towards tomorrow)" | Koda Kumi | Hideaki Tokunaga | Akihisa Matzura | 4:54 |
| 2. | "Taisetsu na kimi e" | Koda Kumi | Daisuke "DAIS" Miyachi | DAIS&Yuichi Ono | 4:30 |
| 3. | "1000 no Kotoba" (Alternate Orchestra Version) | Kazushige Nojima | Noriko Matsueda • Takahito Eguchi | | 6:25 |
| 4. | "Your Song" | Koda Kumi | Kaido | h-wonder | 5:20 |
| 5. | "Pearl Moon" | Ken Matsubara | Elizabeth Narita | Ken Matsubara | 5:16 |
| 6. | "Rain" | Koda Kumi | Hiroo Yamaguchi | Miki Watanabe | 5:08 |
| 7. | "Hana" | Koda Kumi • Tooko | Kaido | Reo Nishikawa | 5:01 |
| 8. | "Hands" | Koda Kumi | Katsumi Ohnishi | h-wonder | 4:28 |
| 9. | "Saigo no Ame" (Time Heals Version) | Jun Natsume | Takashi Tsushimi | | 4:50 |
| 10. | "Promise" | Koda Kumi | Daisuke "D.I" Imai | Daisuke"D.I"Imai | 4:48 |
| 11. | "You" (Piano Version) | Koda Kumi • Yoko Kuzuya | Yoko Kuzuya | | 4:45 |
| 12. | "Come Back" | Koda Kumi | Miki Watanabe | h-wonder | 5:37 |
| 13. | "Kiseki" | Koda Kumi • Kosuke Morimoto | Kosuke Morimoto | Reo Nishikawa | 5:01 |
| 14. | "Walk" | Koda Kumi | Kazuhito Kikuchi | Masaya Suzuki for Ground-Base Project | 5:07 |

=== DVD ===
DISC2: DVD
| No. | Title | Length |
|---|---|---|
| 1. | "Get Up & Move!!" |
| 2. | "Crazy 4 U (Dance Version)" |
| 3. | "Juicy (Dance Version)" |
| 4. | "So into You (Dance Version)" |
| 5. | "Selfish (Dance Version)" |
| 6. | "Candy feat. Mr.Blistah (Dance Version)" |
| 7. | "Hot Stuff feat. KM-MARKIT (Dance Version)" |
| 8. | "Live DVD 『Koda Kumi Live Tour 2006–2007〜Second Session〜』 Trailer" |
| 9. | "Love goes like･･･ from Koda Kumi Live Tour 2006–2007 ~Second Session~" |
| 10. | "How to Dance Video〜Get Up & Move!!〜: 1st Block：Get image!!; 2nd Block：Practice move!!; 3rd Block：Last confirmation!!" |

== Charts ==
Oricon Sales Chart (Japan)

| Release | Chart | Peak position | First week sales | Sales total | Chart run |
|---|---|---|---|---|---|
| March 14, 2007 | Oricon Daily Charts | 2 | | | |
| March 14, 2007 | Oricon Weekly Charts | 2 | 161,458 | 295,624 | 24 weeks |
| March 14, 2007 | Oricon Monthly Charts | 5 | | | |
| March 14, 2007 | Oricon Yearly Charts | 57 | | | |
