= 7 Spirits =

Video by Koda Kumi
- Released: March 19, 2003
- Recorded: 2000–2003
- Genre: Pop, hip-hop, R&B
- Label: Rhythm Zone

Koda Kumi chronology
| 7 Spirits (2003) | Feel... (2004) |

7 Spirits is the first DVD released by artist Koda Kumi and was released the same day as her second studio album Grow into One. The DVD contains the music videos that correspond to her singles from albums affection and Grow into One. Along with the videos, content also includes off-shots and bonus images.

The DVD has sold more than 35,439 copies since its release in March 2003.

== Information ==
7 Spirits is the first DVD released by Japanese singer-songwriter Koda Kumi. The DVD was released alongside her second studio album, grow into one, and contained all of the music videos released between her debut single Take Back and real Emotion.

The DVD charted low on Oricon, coming in at No. 28. Despite the low ranking, it remained on the charts for forty-five weeks. As of 2009, the DVD has sold more than 35,439 copies.

7 Spirits, along with the music videos, contained the behind-the-scenes making videos for all of the videos, along with bonus promotional photos from both the singles and the DVD, which were only able to be viewed on the DVD as a slideshow.

== Music videos ==
Although the music videos for each song had been shown on television music networks, such as MTV Japan, this was the first time they were released to the public for purchase.

"Take Back" was the initial debut video of Koda Kumiko, under the stage name "Koda Kumi." The video featured Kumi donning a red crop top and blue contact lenses, flanked by three backup dancers.

"Trust Your Love" was set in the arctic tundra. In the video, Kumi wore a metallic blue top and metallic silver pants, a style which had been very common in early-2000s music videos in North America. The two dancers in the video were the same from her previous video.

"Color Of Soul" showed the many faces of people around the world. In the video, only Kumi's upper torso is shown. This was due to her producers believing her to be overweight.

"So Into You" was set in Japan, hinting towards many taboos in Japanese culture. This was evidenced by people in the video being shown wide-eyed while their mouths were covered. The video featured Kumi dancing in front of two pagodas while donning black flare pants and a black crop top.

"love across the ocean" was set in a futuristic setting with Kumi being sent to Earth. In the video, she wears a metallic gold outfit as she dances in front of a Space Shuttle.

"m•a•z•e" was set in an airport with Kumi being evaluated by a psychologist. In the video, the psychologist shows her disturbing images while flashing to him having an affair with his nurse. The track had been used as the theme song to the Japanese drama Psycho Doctor.

"real Emotion" was set in the Final Fantasy world of Spira. The video became the first time an artist took part in creating a dance for a video game, with Kumi's dance being digitized into the game for the opening number. The music video showed aspects of creating the in-game video, with Kumi on the platform that would be used to track her movements, so as to layer them over the Yuna character.

== Track List ==
(Official Track list)

=== DVD ===
1. "Take Back" (Music Video)
2. "Trust Your Love" (Music Video)
3. "Color Of Soul" (Music Video)
4. "So Into You" (Music Video)
5. "love across the ocean" (Music Video)
6. "m•a•z•e" (Music Video)
7. "real Emotion" (Music Video)
8. "Bonus Pictures"
9. "TV-CM"
