= Eternity: Love & Songs at Billboard Live =

Video by Koda Kumi
- Released: 23 February 2011 (DVD); 18 May 2011 (Blu-ray); 20 March 2013 (rental live CD)
- Recorded: 2010
- Genre: Pop, R&B, J-pop, dance-pop
- Label: Rhythm Zone
- Producer: Koda Kumi

Koda Kumi chronology
Live Tour 2010: Universe (2010)	Eternity: Love & Songs at Billboard Live (2011)	10th Anniversary: Fantasia in Tokyo Dome (2011)

Eternity: Love & Songs at Billboard Live (stylized as ETERNITY ~Love & Songs~ at Billboard Live) is the eighth live DVD released by the Japanese singer/songwriter Koda Kumi. The DVD is part of her celebration of ten years as an artist and contains content from her first cover album, Eternity: Love & Songs. There were a total of 16 performances held over four days in Osaka and Tokyo starting on 6 December 2010. The concert was performed with a live band. The DVD charted at No. 2 on Oricon Live Charts.

In 2011, total sales of the DVD reached over 27,520.

== Information ==
Eternity ~Love & Songs~ at Billboard Live is Japanese singer-songwriter Kumi Koda's eighth concert DVD. It charted at No. 2 on the Oricon Live charts and remained on the charts for six weeks.

The performances were to celebrate the tenth anniversary of Kumi's debut, which was with her single Take Back on 6 December 2006. The first performance was held in Osaka and began on 6 December 2010. Most of the songs performed were from her first cover album, Eternity ~Love & Songs~, along with some songs from Feel My Mind and Kingdom, and was performed with a live band.

The DVD was released as both a standard edition and a limited edition. The latter included documentary footage of the concert as a bonus track.

As of 2011, the DVD has sold over 27,520 copies.

== Track listing ==
(Source)

=== DVD ===
1. "Sweet Memories"
2. "Tattoo"
3. "Break It Down"
4. "More"
5. "Ai no Uta"
6. "Suki de, Suki de, Suki de."
7. "0-ji Mae no Tsunderella"
8. "Ai no Kotoba"
9. "Magic"
10. "You're So Beautiful"
11. "Chiisa na koi no uta"
12. "Megumi no Hito"
13. "Be My Baby"
14. "Hashire!"
15. Billboard Live Documentary Movie

== Chart history ==
Chart	Peak position
Oricon Weekly DVD Top 200	2
