= Flower (Koda Kumi song) =

Single by Kumi Koda

from the album Best: First Things
- Released: August 10, 2005 (JP)
- Genre: R&B
- Length: 18:21
- Label: Rhythm Zone; RZCD-45270 (Japan, CD)
- Songwriter(s): Yoshi, y@suo ohtani

Kumi Koda singles chronology
"Butterfly" (2005)	"Flower" (2005)	"Promise/Star" (2005)

"Flower" (stylized as flower) is Koda Kumi's 17th domestic single. Flower was written as the theme song for the novel Koibana (恋バナ / Love Story) and also used in the television advertisement for the novel. The lyrics were written by the author of Koibana, Yoshi. This was also the first domestic single released by Kumi that was not accompanied by a promotional music video. It reached No. 4 on the weekly Oricon Chart.

== Information ==
flower is Japanese singer-songwriter Kumi Koda's seventeenth single. The song was a pop ballad and was her first single to not have a corresponding music video. It peaked at No. 4 on the Oricon Singles Charts, despite not having a music video, and remained on the charts for ten weeks.

The single was released after her success of single "Butterfly," which was the artist's first number-one single. "flower" was used as the theme song to the novel Koibana, which was written by Yoshi. Yoshi had also written the lyrics to the song, reflecting the meaning of the story.

The song would be placed on Kumi's first compilation album, Best ~first things~. The song still did not garner a music video on the album. Kumi would perform this song during the encore for her Live Tour 2005 ~first things~.

== Track listing ==
CD
No.	Title	Lyrics	Music	Length
1.	"flower"	Yoshi	y@suo ohtani	4:43
2.	"flower ~acoustic version~"	Yoshi	y@suo ohtani • tasuku	4:30
3.	"flower" (Instrumental)		y@suo ohtani	4:41
4.	"flower ~acoustic version~" (Instrumental)		y@suo ohtani • tasuku	4:27

== Chart history ==
=== Oricon 2005 Singles Top 999 ===
Chart position: #165

=== Sales ===
First week estimate: 36,859 Total estimate: 106,099
