= Grow into One =

Studio album by Koda Kumi
- Released: March 19, 2003
- Recorded: 2001–2002
- Genre: Pop; hip hop; R&B
- Length: 65:33
- Language: Japanese
- Label: Rhythm Zone
- Producer: Max Matsuura

Koda Kumi chronology
Affection (2002)	Grow into One (2003)	Feel My Mind (2004)

Singles from Grow into One
- 1. "The Meaning of Peace" Released: December 19, 2001; 2. "Love Across the Ocean" Released: July 24, 2002; 3. "Maze" Released: December 11, 2002; 4. "Real Emotion/1000 no Kotoba" Released: March 5, 2003

Grow into One (stylized as grow into one) is the second studio album released by Japanese pop and R&B singer Koda Kumi, released on March 19, 2003. It barely peaked in the Top 10 on Oricon, coming it at #8, and charted for 43 weeks. The album also contained, at the time, one of her best-selling singles, "Real Emotion/1000 no Kotoba". Combined with the singles, the album has sold over half a million copies in Japan.

The album featured rap duo Clench & Blistah and urban contemporary singer and producer Lisa, who had been featured on Kumi's single "Maze", after having just split from her founded hip-hop group M-Flo.

== Background and composition ==
Grow into One was released one year after her debut album Affection. The album was predominantly R&B with the only pop songs being those she performed for Final Fantasy X-2, which was released on the PlayStation 2 in 2003. Those songs were "real Emotion" and "1000 no Kotoba". The only other pop song was "To Be One", which was used in some of the online advertising for Final Fantasy X-2.

There was one B-side to make it to the album: the song "One," which featured reggae artist and music producer Lisa, and was originally released on Kumi's single "Maze". The album also contained her first collaboration attempt with Japanese rappers Clench & Blistah with the first track, "Teaser." She would later feature Blistah (known as Mr. Blistah) for several works and collaborate with the duo for their own songs, most notably her song "Candy" and Clench & Blistah's song "Stands Up!."

Concerning the success stemming from Final Fantasy X-2, Koda stated, "Although my second album, which I released directly after "Real Emotion" … the singles I released afterwards ranked outside of the top 10." Koda Kumi was hopeful for her Grow into One album due to the success of "Real Emotion/1000 no Kotoba". Due to the album gaining attention by charted in the Top 10, she began to push herself in her later singles. However, none of the following singles followed the success of "real Emotion", with Koda saying, "Because my hopes had been so high, the fall was really too hard."

== Release ==
Grow into One was released in a standard and limited edition. The former contained the standard fourteen tracks, while the latter contained a Final Fantasy X-2 trading card and an unpublished, alternate arrangement of "1000 no Kotoba", was used during the ending credits of the game and had been placed on the second disc of the Final Fantasy X-2 Original Soundtrack. She would later be placed on her third compilation album Best: Bounce & Lovers in 2007.

== Reception ==
Grow into One peaked at number eight on the Oricon Albums Chart, becoming her first album to chart in the top ten. It remained on the chart for nearly ten months. Between the album and the preluding singles, the total sales reached over 500,000.

== Music videos ==
Music videos for several songs on Grow into One were released alongside the DVD 7 Spirits, which included music videos for the songs "Love Across the Ocean", set in a futuristic setting with Kumi being sent to earth, "Maze", set in an airport with Kumi being evaluated by a psychologist, and "Real Emotion", set in the Final Fantasy world of Spira.

== Track listing ==
Official track list.

No.	Title	Lyrics	Music	Arrangement	Length
1.	"Teaser" (featuring Clench & Blistah)	Clench & Blistah; Sachi Bennett	Miki Watanabe	Watanabe	1:53
2.	"Real Emotion"	Kenn Kato	Kazuhiro Hara	H-Wonder	3:59
3.	"Boy Friend?"	Ken Matsubara	H-Wonder	H-Wonder	4:40
4.	"Your Only One"	Koda Kumi	Daisuke Suzuki	H-Wonder	4:53
5.	"one" (featuring LISA)	Koda; Elizabeth Narita	Narita	Ryuichiro Yamaki	3:31
6.	"One Night Romance"	Daisuke Imai	Imai	H-Wonder	4:36
7.	"1000 no Kotoba"	Kazushige Nojima	Noriko Matsueda; Takahito Eguchi	Matsueda; Eguchi	5:58
8.	"S.O.S ~Sound of Silence~"	Kenn Kato	Suzuki	Ryuichiro Yamaki	3:23
9.	"m•a•z•e"	Kenn Kato	Hirō Yamaguchi	813; H-Wonder	4:05
10.	"Ranhansha" (反射; "Diffused Reflection")	Matsubara	Watanabe	Matsubara	4:00
11.	"Pearl Moon"	Matsubara	Narita	Matsubara	5:16
12.	"Nasty Girl"	Koda	Genki Hibino; Shifo	Seiji Akiyama	4:39
13.	"To Be One"	Kenn Kato	Masaki Iehara	Satoshi Hidaka	4:25
14.	"Love Across the Ocean"	Koda	Tsukasa	H-Wonder	3:38
15.	"1000 no Kotoba" (alternate orchestra version)	Kazushige Nojima	Matsueda; Eguchi		6:25

== Charts and certifications ==
Chart (2003)	Peak position
Japanese Albums (Oricon)	8

Region	Certification	Certified units/sales
Japan (RIAJ)	Gold	100,000^{^}
^{^} Shipments figures based on certification alone.
