= Love Across the Ocean =

Single by Koda Kumi

from the album Grow into One
- Released: July 24, 2002 (JP)
- Genre: J-pop; dance-pop; electropop; R&B
- Length: 23:23
- Label: Rhythm Zone; RZCD-45061 (Japan, CD)
- Songwriter(s): Kumi Koda (words: "Love Across the Ocean" & "So into You"); Tsukasa (music: "Love Across the Ocean"); Tetsuya Komuro ("The Meaning of Peace"); Yasuhiro Abe ("So into You")

Koda Kumi singles chronology
"So into You" (2002)	"Love Across the Ocean" (2002)	"m•a•z•e" (2002)

Music video
- "Love Across the Ocean" on YouTube

"Love Across the Ocean" (stylized as "love across the ocean") is Koda Kumi's fifth domestic solo single. It charted at No. 19 on Oricon and stayed on the charts for four weeks.

== Information ==
love across the ocean is Japanese singer-songwriter Kumi Koda's fifth domestic single. The single peaked at No. 19 on the Oricon Weekly charts and remained on the charts for four weeks. It became her first single released for her second studio album, Grow into One, which would be released the following year on March 19.

The title track was used in a television advertisement for Kanebo Cosmetics' TESUTIMO (カネボウ化粧品「テスティモ」 / Kaneobou Keshouhin "TESUTIMO"). The single's b-sides were a remix of So into You and the "single version" of The Meaning of Peace.

The version of The Meaning of Peace featured on the single was Kumi's solo and had a different instrumental than the version originally released with BoA for the Song Nation project. This version of the song was later placed on Kumi's first compilation album, Best ~first things~, as a bonus track.

The music video for love across the ocean was placed on the corresponding DVD, 7 Spirits.

== Promotional advertisements ==
To help promote the song, love across the ocean was used in a commercial for the Kao Corporation's TESUTIMO under their Kanebo Cosmetics line.

== Music video ==
The music video for love across the ocean carried a space-oriented theme, symbolizing how love can travel across the galaxy.

It begins with Kumi appearing to have landed on Earth and trying to get used to Earth's atmosphere. Throughout the video, the version of Kumi tries to get used to Earth's atmosphere as another incarnation of her dances in front of a Space Shuttle.

The music video was later released for purchase on her DVD 7 Spirits in March the following year.

== Track listing ==
CD
No.	Title	Lyrics	Music	Arrangers	Length
1.	"love across the ocean"	Koda Kumi	TSUKASA	h-wonder	3:37
2.	"the meaning of peace"	Tetsuya Komuro	Tetsuya Komuro	h-wonder	5:20
3.	"So into You" (Dub's Electro Remix)	Koda Kumi	Izumi "D.M.X" Miyazaki		5:23
4.	"love across the ocean" (Instrumental)		TSUKASA	h-wonder	3:41
5.	"the meaning of peace" (Instrumental)		Tetsuya Komuro	h-wonder	5:19

== Oricon Chart history ==
- Peak position: #19
- Weeks in top 200: 4

=== Sales ===
- First week estimate: 10,070
- Total estimate: 22,100

== Alternate versions ==
love across the ocean

1. love across the ocean: Found on the single (2002) and corresponding album Grow into One (2003)
2. love across the ocean [Instrumental]: Found on the single (2002)
3. love across the ocean [Caramel Pod Remix]: Found on Koda Kumi Driving Hit's 2 (2010)
