= Yellow Generation =

J-Pop Group from Japan

Yellow Generation (known as YeLLOW Generation in Japan) was a female J-pop trio signed under Sony Music Japan's DefSTAR Record label from 2002-2006. The group was best known for the singles "Kitakaze to Taiyō" (北風と太陽, North Wind and Sun), and "Tobira no Mukō e" (扉の向こうへ, "To the Other Side of the Door"), which was the second ending theme for the anime Fullmetal Alchemist.

The trio was made up of the members Yuki (ユキ), Yūko (ユウコ), and Hitomi (ヒトミ). Altogether the band had released two albums and nine singles, but after a year of silence the band finally decided to part ways on November 15, 2006. A greatest hits album, titled GOLDEN☆BEST YeLLOW Generation Singles+, was later released in 2010.

== Albums ==
Carpe Diem - December 11, 2002

- 01. Open your eyes
- 02. Carpe Diem～今、この瞬間を生きる～ (Carpe Diem ~ima kono shunkan o ikiru~)
- 03. 北風と太陽 (Kitakaze to Taiyō)
- 04. 逃げ水～Like a road mirage～ (Nigemizu ~Like a road mirage~)
- 05. Lost Generation
- 06. Another“Myself”
- 07. 裸の王様 (Hadaka no Osama)
- 08. 2880316～地球最後の日の皆様へ～ (2880316 ~Chikyū Saigo no Hi no Minasama e~)
- 09. Christmas Card
- 10. 鬼灯 (Hozuki)
- 11. I will never forget.～もうひとつの理由～ (I will never forget)
- 12. And Just Open Your Heart

Life-Sized Portrait - August 10, 2005

- 01. Yellow
- 02. 扉の向こうへ (Tobira no Mukō e)
- 03. うたかた (Utakata)
- 04. Listen!
- 05. トリトマ (Toritoma)
- 06. レモナーデ (Remona-De)
- 07. あのね・・・ (ano ne...)
- 08. チョコレイト～鮮烈な味わい魅惑の世界～ (Chocolate ~senretsu na ajiwai miwaku no sekai~)
- 09. 夜空に咲く花～eternal place～ (Yozora ni Saku Hana ~eternal place~)
- 10. 春雷 (Shunrai)
- 11. 終わりのない道 (Owari no Nai Michi)
- 12. 扉の向こうへ～Fullmetal mix～ (Tobira no Mukō e ~FULLMETAL mix~)

== Singles ==
Lost Generation - June 5, 2002

- 01. Lost Generation
- 02. 逃げ水 ~Like a road mirage~ (Nigemizu ~Like a road mirage~)
- 03. Lost Generation (less vocal)

北風と太陽 (Kitakaze to Taiyō) - August 21, 2002

- 01. 北風と太陽 (Kitakaze to Taiyō)
- 02. 2880316 ~地球最後の日の皆様へ~ (2880316 ~Chikyū Saigo no Hi no Minasama e~)
- 03. 北風と太陽 (less vocal)

Carpe Diem~今,この瞬間を生きる~ (Carpe Diem ~Ima, kono Shunkan o Ikiru~) - November 20, 2002

- 01. Carpe Diem~今,この瞬間を生きる~ (Carpe Diem ~Ima, kono Shunkan o Ikiru~)
- 02. 裸の王様 (Hadaka no Ousama)
- 03. I will never forget.~もうひとつの理由~(less Music Version) (I will never forget ~Mō hitotsu no Riyū~(less Music Version))
- 04. Carpe Diem~今,この瞬間を生きる~(less Vocal Version)

うたかた (Utakata) - May 14, 2003

- 01. うたかた (Utakata)
- 02. 春雷 (Shunrai)
- 03. うたかた (less vocal)
- 04. 春雷 (less vocal)

夜空に咲く花~eternal place~ (Yozora ni Saku Hana ~eternal place~) - September 18, 2003

- 01. 夜空に咲く花~eternal place~ (Yozora ni Saku Hana ~eternal place~)
- 02. …by my side
- 03. 君がいたから~eternal way~(朗読) (Kimi ga Itakara ~eternal way~ (Spoken Version))
- 04. 夜空に咲く花~eternal place~(less vocal)

扉の向こうへ (Tobira no Mukō e) - January 28, 2004

- 01. 扉の向こうへ (Tobira no Mukōou e)
- 02. 君がいたから~eternal way~ (Kimi ga Itakara ~eternal way~)
- 03. 扉の向こうへ (less vocal)
- 04. 君がいたから~eternal way~(less vocal)

Yellow - April 6, 2005

- 01. Yellow
- 02. Take Out
- 03. Yellow-less vocal-
- 04. Take Out-less vocal-

トリトマ (Tritoma) - July 13, 2005

- 01. トリトマ (Tritoma)
- 02. 恋のから騒ぎ!? (Koi no Karasawagi!?)
- 03. トリトマ(less vocal)
- 04. 恋のから騒ぎ!?(less vocal)

Dual - December 7, 2005

- 01. Dual
- 02. two love, true love
- 03. Dual (less vocal)
- 04. two love, true love (less vocal)
