= Affection (Koda Kumi album) =

Studio album by Koda Kumi
- Released: March 27, 2002
- Recorded: 2000–2002
- Genres: Pop; R&B
- Length: 59:33
- Label: Rhythm Zone
- Producer: Max Matsuura

Koda Kumi chronology
Affection (2002)	Grow into One (2003)

Singles from Affection
- 1. "Take Back" Released: December 6, 2000; 2. "Trust Your Love" Released: May 9, 2001; 3. "Color of Soul" Released: October 3, 2001; 4. "So into You" Released: March 13, 2002

Affection (stylized as affection) is the debut studio album by Japanese pop and R&B singer Koda Kumi. It was released on March 27, 2002. It has been her only album to not chart in the Top 10, debuting at No. 12 on Oricon and staying on the charts for six weeks, making it her lowest-charting studio album. During its run, it had only sold 91,360 copies. The limited editions of the album contained remixes for "Take Back" and "Trust Your Love", which had previously been released on her North American release of the singles.

This album carries her most famous ballad, "walk," which, starting from her first tour, Secret ~First Class Limited Live~ (2005), she has performed at every concert. It also contained her first collaboration attempt, "Till Morning Comes," which featured Japanese rapper VERBAL, who is part of the hip-hop duo m-flo.

== Information ==
Affection is singer-songwriter Kumi Koda's debut studio album. It charted at No. 12 on the Oricon weekly charts, but was her lowest selling album with only 91,360 copies sold. The album was predominantly R&B with the only pop song being "Best Friend Of Mine," which was done a cappella. This has also been Kumi's only full a capella song to date.

The album was also released as a limited edition, which contained two remixes performed in English: "Take Back [Jonathan Peters' Radio Mix]" and "Trust Your Love [Hex Hector Main Radio Mix]," both songs which had been previously released on her North American release of the singles. This edition was sold with a slipcase cover, as well. Though the album contained a-sides, there was no accompanying DVD. Instead, the music videos for "Take Back," "Trust Your Love," "Color of Soul" and the limited single "So into You" were later placed on her DVD 7 Spirits, which would be released a year later on March 19, 2003, alongside her Grow into One album.

The album contained her first collaborative effort on the CD, which was "Till Morning Comes." The track featured rapper Verbal, who is part of the hip-hop duo m-flo. Although her song "The Meaning of Peace," which had been performed with female singer BoA, was released prior in December 2001, the song was not classified as a collaboration and was, instead, classified as a duet.

affection also contained her most famous ballad, "walk," which, starting from her first tour, Secret ~First Class Limited Live~, she has performed at every concert. In 2010, she would release a ten-year anniversary version of the song, titled "walk ~to the future~", on her Suki de, Suki de, Suki de. single.

== Promotional Advertisements ==
At the time of the album's released, Koda Kumi had not made a debut on television and traveled to local nightclubs to sing and promote.

"I had to go across the country and sing in clubs for promotion purposes. . .it was tough on me." – Koda Kumi

In KODA REKI, Kumi's self-published biography, Kumi talks about how she felt guilty for not meeting what she felt was her staff's expectations as far as single sales. She explained how she had to go to nightclubs to promote her singles and album, and the difficulty to adjusting to the night life. Despite this, however, she said she was still "happy for the experience."

== Packaging ==
The album was released in two editions, a standard CD and a limited edition CD. The regular edition contained fourteen musical tracks, along with the booklet and the obi strip. The limited editions, however, contained two bonus tracks, remixes for the songs "Take Back" and "Trust Your Love," and a slipcase cover.

The remixes of the two tracks were performed in English. Both remixes were from her North American releases of the singles – which she had released under the stage name "Koda" – neither of which had received a release in Japan.

== Music videos ==
affection did not receive a CD+DVD release or a corresponding DVD upon its release; however, promotional videos were released during each singles' release.

The promotional videos for the a-sides released during the album's era were not released on a DVD until 7 Spirits, which also carried the music videos for the then-released album Grow into One.

The affection era videos released on the DVD were:

- Take Back: the initial debut video of the artist "Koda Kumi."
- Trust Your Love: set in the winter tundra.
- Color Of Soul: the video showed the many different angles of people around the world.
- So Into You: set in Japan, hinting towards taboos in Japanese culture.

== Track listing ==
All lyrics are written by Kumi Koda, except where noted.

No.	Title	Lyrics	Music	Arrangement	Length
1.	"Atomic Energy"	Ken Harada	Harada	Harada	1:33
2.	"Trust Your Love"		Kazuhito Kikuchi	H-Wonder	4:27
3.	"Go Together"		Kazuhiro Hara	Hara	4:40
4.	"Your Song (Original Mix)"		Kaido	H-Wonder	5:18
5.	"Feel Me"		Miki Watanabe	H-Wonder	4:20
6.	"Color of Soul"	Natsumi Watanabe	M. Watanabe	H-Wonder	4:28
7.	"Best Friend Of Mine"		M. Watanabe	Tetsuya Takahashi	1:52
8.	"My Dream"		Motsu	H-Wonder	4:35
9.	"So into You"		Yasuhiro Abe	H-Wonder	4:31
10.	"Till Morning Comes" (feat. Verbal)	Kumi Koda; Verbal	Kaoru Okubo	H-Wonder	3:47
11.	"Come Back"		M. Watanabe	H-Wonder	5:36
12.	"Take Back"		Kikuchi	H-Wonder	4:56
13.	"Can't Lose"		Ken Harada	H-Wonder	3:51
14.	"Walk"		Kikuchi	Masaya Suzuki	5:06

First press edition bonus tracks
No.	Title	Music	remix	Length
15.	"Take Back" (Jonathan Peters' Radio Mix - English Version)	Kikuchi	Jonathan Peters	3:33
16.	"Trust Your Love" (Hex Hector Main Radio Mix - English Version)	Kikuchi	Hex Hector	3:09

== Charts and sales ==
Oricon Ranking (Weekly)	Sales
12	105,360

== Alternate Versions ==
come back

1. come back: Found on the album (2002)
2. come back [PLUG in LANGUAGE Remix]: Found on Koda Kumi Driving Hit's 3 (2011)

walk

1. walk: Found on the album (2002)
2. walk ~to the future~: Found on single Suki de, Suki de, Suki de. (2010)
3. walk [soichi Ono Remix]: Found on Koda Kumi Driving Hit's 4 (2012)
