= Song Nation =

Studio album by Various artists
- Released: January 23, 2002
- Recorded: 2001, 2002
- Genre: J-pop
- Length: 55:35
- Label: Avex Trax; AVCD-17065 (Japan, CD)
- Producer: Max Matsuura, Tetsuya Komuro

Various artists chronology
| Song Nation (2002) | Song Nation 2: Trance (2002) |

Professional ratings
Review scores
| Source | Rating |
|---|---|
| J-fan | 9/10 link |

Song Nation (originally known as Various Artists Featuring Song Nation) is a charity compilation album featuring some of the most important Japanese performers from the Avex Trax label. The CD was made to raise money for the September 11, 2001 attacks. It was produced by two of the most important record producers of Japan: Masato "Max" Matsuura and Globe's Tetsuya Komuro. A remix album was released titled Song Nation 2: Trance. It contained an additional disc and additional tracks along with of the original tracks from the first Song Nation. A Song Is Born, the track by Ayumi Hamasaki and Keiko was able to peak at #1 on the Oricon Singles Chart. Upon its release, the album entered the Oricon Albums Chart at number one with first week sales of over 81 100 copies.

== Track listing ==
1. "A Song Is Born" – Ayumi Hamasaki & Keiko
2. "the Meaning of Peace" – Kumi Koda & BoA
3. "Lovin' It" Namie Amuro and Verbal
4. "In Case of Me" – Kaori Mochida
5. "Again" – Tomiko Van
6. "My Planet" – Hitomi
7. "Do Over Again" – Halna
8. "One Nation" – TRF
9. "Get Into You Suddenly" – Balance
10. "Lights Brought the Future" – Keiko
