= So into You (Koda Kumi song) =

Single by Koda Kumi

from the album Affection
- Released: March 13, 2002 (JP)
- Genre: J-pop
- Length: 24:22
- Label: Rhythm Zone; RZCD-45055 (Japan, CD)
- Songwriter(s): Koda Kumi, Yasuhiro Abe

Koda Kumi singles chronology
"The Meaning of Peace" (2001)	"So into You" (2002)	"Love Across the Ocean" (2002)

Music video
- "So into You" on YouTube

"So into You" (stylized as So into You) is the fourth solo single by Japanese singer Koda Kumi. It ranked No. 50 on the Oricon chart and only remained on the chart for two weeks.

== Information ==
"So into You" is singer-songwriter Kumi Koda's fourth single and was of a limited release. It charted low on the Oricon weekly charts, only coming it at No. 50 and staying on the charts for two weeks.

The song was used as the themes to Rank Kingdom (ランク王国 / RANKU Oukoku) and Tokyo Club Gang. The single's B-sides were remixes of two previous songs: "Take Back" and "Color of Soul".

"So into You"'s corresponding music video was released on her DVD 7 Spirits. The video carried an overall Japan theme, with a meaning of enjoying the time you spend with someone until you begin to fall in love.

Similar to her previous single "Color of Soul", "So into You" was not released in the United States, whereas the artist chose to focus only on the music market in Japan. A short version of the music video was later released on the DVD to her 2007 compilation album, Best ~Bounce & Lovers~.

== Promotional advertisements ==
During its release, "So into You" was used as the theme song to two network shows and the ending theme to a music channel.

These included Rank Kingdom (ランク王国 / RANKU Oukoku) and Japan Countdown (stylized in Japan and JAPAN COUNTDOWN). It was also used as the ending theme to Tokyo Club Gang.

== Music video ==
During the filming of her previous song "Color of Soul", avex had told Kumi to lose weight or her next music video would be animated. Between filming, Kumi had managed to lose the weight and, in doing so, sported a crop top in the video – the first time she had shown her stomach since her debut.

The music video was very much inspired by Japan, with Kumi performing her dance number in front of pagodas, along with two back up dancers. These were not the same dancers used in "Take Back" and "Trust Your Love". Throughout the video, many taboos are hinted towards, with people shown covered in black paint as their mouths are sealed off, symbolizing dark secrets.

Despite the darker tone in the video, the song itself had a positive theme of spending time with someone and falling in love with them over time.

Although the video was released during syndication, the music video would not be released for purchase until the 2003 DVD release of 7 Spirits.

Kumi would later release a short version of the video, which focused solely on the dance, on her third greatest hits album Best ~Bounce & Lovers~.

== Track listing ==
CD
No.	Title	Lyrics	Music	Length
1.	"So into You"	Koda Kumi	Yasuhiro Abe	4:34
2.	"Color of Soul" (Dub's Guitar of Soul remix)	Natsumi Watanabe	Miki Watabe	7:47
3.	"Take Back" (Blackwatch remix)	Koda Kumi	Kazuhito Kikuchi	7:28
4.	"So into You" (instrumental)			4:33
Total length:				23:42

== Alternate versions ==
"So into You"

1. "So into You", on the single and corresponding album affection (2002)
2. "So into You [instrumental]", on the single (2002)
3. "So into You [Dub's electro mix]", on the single "Love Across the Ocean" (2002)
4. "So into You [Sunset in Ibiza remix]", on Koda Kumi Driving Hit's 3 (2011)
