= Trust Your Love =

Single by Koda Kumi

from the album Affection
- B-side: "Still in Love"
- Released: May 3, 2001; November 2, 2001 (US)
- Genre: Pop; R&B
- Length: 4:29
- Label: Rhythm Zone
- Composer: Kazuhito Kikuchi
- Lyricist: Koda Kumi
- Producer: Max Matsuura

Koda Kumi singles chronology
"Take Back" (2000)	"Trust Your Love" (2001)	"Color of Soul" (2001)

Alternative cover
- North American edition cover

Music video
- "Trust Your Love" on YouTube

"Trust Your Love" is a song recorded by Japanese singer-songwriter Koda Kumi and was used as the second single from her debut album Affection (2002). It was released on May 9, 2001 via Rhythm Zone in two physical editions: a CD single and 12" vinyl. Additionally, Sounday and Orpheus Records distributed the song in North America with the same formats, but was remixed as a dance number by Hex Hector. The song was written by Kumi herself, whilst composing and production was handled by Kikuchi Kazuhito and Max Matsuura respectively. Musically, it is an R&B song that incorporates synthesizers and keyboards, and describes two lovers believing in each other.

"Trust Your Love" received positive reviews from music critics, who commended its production and selected it among others as one of her best releases. Commercially, while it did fare better than her debut "Take Back", it performed moderately nevertheless, peaking at No. 18 on the Oricon Singles Chart. In the United States, it reached the top spot on the Billboard Dance/Electronic Singles Sales – a distinction as a Japanese artist – and entered the top 50 on both the Dance Club Songs and Hot 100 Single Sales chart.

An accompanying music video was directed by Ken Sueda, where it depicted the singer in the winter tundra, caved in between icebergs. Several scenes features her with two back-up dancers from her single "Take Back". To promote it up its release, Kumi would sing at local karaoke bars. During her first concert tours, she also included the recording. Since its release, there have been several remixes of the single, most recently on her Driving compilations.

== Background and composition ==
After signing with Rhythm Zone in 2000 by Avex Trax producer Max Matsuura, Kumi had released her debut recording "Take Back" (December 2000). Despite positive commentary by music critics, it experienced minimal success in Japan, reaching the top 60 on the Oricon Singles Chart. Additionally, the single was distributed by Sounday and Orpheus Records in North America, where it made its appearance at number 18 on the Billboard Dance Club Songs, making her one of the highest-charting Japanese acts in the United States. Prompt by its success in the West, executives at Rhythm Zone decided to give Kumi another attempt and began writing new material.

She completed "Trust Your Love" in early 2001. It was composed by Kikuchi Kazuhito and produced by Matsuura himself. Musically, "Trust Your Love" is an R&B song that incorporates instrumentation such as synthesizers and keyboards; the instrumentation was arranged by Japanese musician H-Wonder, and mixed by Koji Morimoto. Much like "Take Back," this single includes minor English phrases that were also written by Kumi. According to an editor at Japanese magazine CD Journal, the review examined that "Trust Your Love" hinted subtle pop elements. For the English version, which was remixed by Hex Hector for its American release, the songwriting was handled by both Kumi and Kazuhito, and was composed as a dance number.

== Release and reception ==
"Trust Your Love" was used as the second single from Kumi's debut album, Affection (2003). It premiered in Japan on May 9, 2001 via Rhythm Zone in two physical editions: a CD single and 12" vinyl. The compact disc included the original recording, an additional b-side recording titled "Still in Love"—along with their instrumental versions—, plus three remixes of the single. Furthermore, the vinyl release included one number on each side: the Thunderpuss mix and Razor's Dub of "Trust Your Love". In her native country, the cover sleeve features a close-up of the singers face. For its North American distribution, the executives at Avex Trax in New York City felt "Trust Your Love" would be successful in the clubs, as was the remix for "Take Back". Both Rhythm Zone and their New York offices hired Hex Hector to work on the American version of the single. Under her North American stage name "Koda," "Trust Your Love" premiered in the West through Sounday and Orpheus Records on November 2 that same year. It was released in the same two formats: a CD and a 12" vinyl.

Upon its release, "Trust Your Love" received positive reviews from music critics. A member at CD Journal was positive, commending its "thick" production and praised its commercial quality. Separately, the same publication gave favorable commentary to each of the remixes featured on the compact disc. AllMusic's Chris True highlighted the number as one of her better releases, amongst others. Commercially, while it did fare better than her debut "Take Back", it performed moderately nevertheless. It peaked at number 18 on the weekly Oricon Singles Chart, marking her first top-twenty in that region, and sold over 42,100 units. In the United States, the Hex Hector remix in English entered at number 22 on the Billboard Dance/Electronic Singles Sales during mid-November 2001. Four weeks later, it reached number one on December 22, giving the distinction of being of the only Japanese acts to achieve the top position on any Billboard chart. Additionally, the single peaked at number 35 on the Dance Club Songs, and number 42 on the Hot 100 Single Sales chart. The original mix in Japanese is available on streaming services such as Apple Music and Spotify.

== Music video ==
An accompanying music video was directed by Ken Sueda, and was released in May 2001. It opens with a partial shot of Kumi's face in front of northern lights, then shifts to her dancing in a winter tundra, caved in between two icebergs. There, she dances with two back-up dancers, both whom appeared in her "Take Back" clip. In additional scenes, it has the singer and the back-up dancers in a black backdrop and wearing gold and black clothing. It ends with Kumi standing still, and the icebergs melting, with water dripping on the ground. In an article of Jame World, Seth Figlerowicz criticized the "boring" scenes and "dark atmosphere" over the "great song", feeling that it did "nothing" for Kumi. The music video for "Trust Your Love" was included on the artist's DVD release 7 Spirits (2003), and subsequently on the DVD packaging of her greatest hits album Best ~first things~ (2005).

== Promotion and other usage ==
To promote the single, Kumi included it on several concert tours. Its first appearance was her Live Tour 2005 First Things show and her Live Tour 2006–2007 Second Session tour. Six years later, the single was included on her 10th Anniversary: Fantasia tour, which commemorated 10 years of her in the music business; the singer performed it during an encore medley. The singles most recent appearance was on her 2016 Best Singles Collection tour, which celebrated majority of her back catalogue of musical releases. Additionally, "Trust Your Love" has appeared on one compilation album conducted by Kumi; its recent inclusion was part of her remix album Koda Kumi Driving Hit's 2 (2010). Upon its release, the recording was broadcast as one of the theme songs to AX Music-Factory, a music television show in Japan that was published through Nippon Television Network (NTV).

== Track listing ==
CD single

1. "Trust Your Love" (Original mix) – 4:27
2. "Still in Love" (Original mix) – 3:37
3. "Trust Your Love" (Sean "Sepp" Hall Remix) – 3:30
4. "Trust Your Love" (Razor Radio mix) – 3:18
5. "Trust Your Love" (Instrumental) – 4:24
6. "Still in Love" (Instrumental) – 3:37

12" vinyl

1. "Trust Your Love" (Thunderpuss Club mix)
2. "Trust Your Love" (Razor's Dub)

US CD single

1. "Trust Your Love" (Hex Hector Main Club Mix) – 8:19
2. "Trust Your Love" (Thunderpuss Club Mix) – 7:02
3. "Trust Your Love" (Hex Hector Main Radio Mix) – 3:11
4. "Trust Your Love" (Thunderpuss Radio Mix) – 3:20
5. "Trust Your Love" (ThunderDUB) – 7:24
6. "Trust Your Love" (Blackwatch Remix) – 7:49

US 12" vinyl

1. "Trust Your Love" (Thunderpuss Club Mix) – 7:02
2. "Trust Your Love" (ThunderDUB) – 7:24
3. "Trust Your Love" (Hex Hector Main Club Mix) – 8:19

== Credits and personnel ==
Credits adapted from the liner notes of both Japanese and US CD singles;

Production and management

- Recorded in 2001 by Max Matsuura. Ownership between Avex USA (New York City) and Rhythm Zone, and distributed by Sounday and Orpheus Records.

Credits

- Kumi Koda – vocals, background vocals, songwriting
- Kazuhito Kikuchi – composing, songwriting
- Max Matsuura – production
- H-Wonder – arranging
- Sean Hall – remixing
- DJ Razor – remixing
- Thunderpuss – remixing
- Toni Aliperti – guitar, bass (English release)
- Mike Nigro – keyboards (English release)
- Hex Hector – remixing (English release)
- Ralph Cook – editing (English release)
- Barry Harris – (English release)
- Chris Cox – (English release)
- Blackwatch – remixing
- Ken Sueda – music video director

== Charts and sales ==
=== Charts ===
Chart (2001–02)	Peak position
Japan (Oricon)	18
US Hot 100 Single Sales (Billboard)	42
US Dance Club Songs (Billboard)	35
US Dance/Electronic Singles Sales (Billboard)	1

=== Sales ===
Region	Certification	Certified units/sales
Japan (RIAJ)	—N/a	42,100

== Release history ==
Region	Date	Format	Label	Ref.
Japan	May 9, 2001	CD; 12" vinyl	Rhythm Zone	
United States	November 2, 2001	CD; 12" vinyl	Sounday; Orpheus Records	
Japan	March 27, 2003	digital download	Avex Music Creative Inc.	
Australia	September 2009	digital download	Avex Music Creative Inc.	
New Zealand	September 2009	digital download	Avex Music Creative Inc.	
United Kingdom	September 2009	digital download	Avex Music Creative Inc.	
Ireland	September 2009	digital download	Avex Music Creative Inc.	
Germany	September 2009	digital download	Avex Music Creative Inc.	
France	September 2009	digital download	Avex Music Creative Inc.	
Spain	September 2009	digital download	Avex Music Creative Inc.	
Taiwan	September 2009	digital download	Avex Music Creative Inc.	
United States	September 2009	digital download	Avex Music Creative Inc.	
Canada	September 2009	digital download	Avex Music Creative Inc.	
