= Promise/Star =

- "Promise" CD only cover

Single by Koda Kumi

from the album Best: First Things
- Released: September 7, 2005 (JP)
- Genre: Promise J-pop, R&B; Star Electronica, dance, house, J-pop
- Length: 17:50
- Label: Rhythm Zone; RZCD-45242/B (Japan, CD+DVD); RZCD-45243 (Japan, CD)

Koda Kumi singles chronology
"Flower" (2005)	"Promise/Star" (2005)	"You" (2005)

Alternative cover
- "Star" CD only cover

Music video
- "Promise" on YouTube "Star" on YouTube

Promise/Star is the first double a-side single by Japanese artist Koda Kumi. It was the final single released before her first compilation album, Best ~first things~. It managed to chart at #4 on Oricon and stayed on the charts for 14 weeks.

== Information ==
Promise/Star is Japanese R&B-turned-pop star Kumi Koda's 18th single domestic single under the Avex sub-label Rhythm Zone. The single was Kumi's first attempt at a double a-side and was her final single released before her first greatest hits album, Best ~first things~. It peaked at #4 on the Oricon Singles Charts and remained on the charts for 14 weeks.

The single consisted of the upbeat pop song "Star" and the emotional ballad "Promise," along with their corresponding instrumentals. The CD only edition was of limited release and contained unique cover art, compared to the CD+DVD edition.

"Promise" was used as the ending theme on the TV Asahi show Telechika, while "Star" was used as a promotional campaign for the Nintendo DS game Urusei Yatsura: Endless Summer.

Despite being a double a-side, "Star" only received a short version, the music video only being a minute and a half long. It was speculated that the full version would be released on Best ~first things~, but a complete version was never released.

== Packaging ==
Promise/Star was released in two editions: CD and CD+DVD. Along with the music videos on the DVD, a behind-the-scenes making video was also included.

While the single received two editions, the CD only was of limited release.

Limited editions of the single contained specialized cover art for both the CD and CD+DVD editions. However, on the standard editions, both "Promise" and "Star" received their own cover art, whereas the booklets were reversible.

== Music video ==
"Promise" carried a sad theme of a woman crying at a wedding altar, missing her fiancé, who had died prior to their wedding. In the video, Kumi is donning a wedding dress and veil during the past scenes and a full black ensemble during the mourning present day scenes.

"Star" was more optimistic, with Kumi in front of a starry background. There were no scene changes in "Star," instead only changes in camera angles.

== Track listing ==
(Source)

CD
No.	Title	Lyrics	Music	Arranger(s)	Length
1.	"Promise"	Koda Kumi	Daisuke "D.I" Imai	Daisuke "D.I" Imai	4:48
2.	"Star"	Koda Kumi	Kosuke Morimoto	h-wonder	4:07
3.	"Promise" (Instrumental)		Daisuke "D.I" Imai	Daisuke "D.I" Imai	4:48
4.	"Star" (Instrumental)		Kosuke Morimoto	h-wonder	4:03

DVD
No.	Title	Lyrics	Music	Length
1.	"Promise" (Music Video)	Koda Kumi	Daisuke "D.I" Imai	5:08
2.	"Star [Short Version]" (Music Video)	Koda Kumi	Kosuke Morimoto	1:36
3.	"Promise/Star" (Making Video)			9:08

== Chart history ==
=== Oricon 2005 Singles Top 999 ===
Chart position: #165

== Charts and sales ==
Oricon Ranking
(Weekly)
4

=== Sales ===
First week estimate: 34,589 Total estimate: 61,312

== Alternate Versions ==
Promise

1. Promise: Found on the single and corresponding album Best ~first things~ (2005)
2. Promise [Instrumental]: Found on the single (2005)
3. Promise [ELMER VoVo Remix]: Found on Koda Kumi Driving Hit's 6 (2014)
