= Suki de, Suki de, Suki de./Anata Dake ga =

"Suki de, Suki de, Suki de. / Anata Dake ga"

Single by Koda Kumi

from the album Dejavu
- B-side: "Walk (To the Future)"
- Released: September 22, 2010
- Recorded: 2010
- Genre: J-pop; R&B
- Length: 4:58 ("Suki de, Suki de, Suki de."); 5:09 ("Anata Dake ga")
- Label: Rhythm Zone
- Songwriters: Koda Kumi, Markie, Katsuhiko Sugiyama

Koda Kumi singles chronology
"Gossip Candy" (2010)	"Suki de, Suki de, Suki de. / Anata Dake ga" (2010)	"Pop Diva" (2011)

Music video
- "Suki de, Suki de, Suki de." on YouTube "Anata dake ga" on YouTube

"Suki de, Suki de, Suki de." / "Anata dake ga" (Japanese: 好きで、好きで、好きで。/ あなただけが ) is a single recorded by Japanese singer Koda Kumi. It is a concept single, featuring three different ballads with three different music videos. The B-side of the single, "Walk ~To the Future~", is a re-arrangement of "Walk" from Kumi's 2002 debut album, Affection.

Commercially, the single has been certified gold by the Recording Industry Association of Japan (RIAJ) for a shipment of 100,000 copies. "Suki de, Suki de, Suki de." was certified double platinum for downloads and "Anata Dake ga" was certified platinum.

== Release and versions ==
"Suki de, Suki de, Suki de." (Ali's Warmy Remix) was included on Koda Kumi Driving Hit's 4 (2012). A string version and a music box version of "Anata dake ga" was included on her single "Ai o Tomenaide", released one year later. "Anata Dake ga" (World Sketch Remix) was included on Koda Kumi Driving Hit's 3 (2011).

== Music videos ==
Three music videos were shot for the release and formed together to create a continuous thematic story. Koda Kumi's younger sister, misono, appeared in two of the videos.

== Promotional advertisements ==
"Suki de, Suki de, Suki de." was the commercial song for Kracie's Ichikami (いち髪) shampoo range, which featured Koda Kumi as the spokesperson for the surrounding marketing campaign. "Anata Dake ga" was used as the NHK drama Second Virgin's theme song.

== Track listing ==
All lyrics are written by Koda Kumi.

CD single
No.	Title	Music	Arranger	Length
1.	"Suki de, Suki de, Suki de." (好きで、好きで、好きで。; Love, Love, Love.)	Katsuhiko Sugiyama	Shinjiroh Inoue	4:58
2.	"Anata Dake ga" (あなただけが; Only You)	Markie Sizk from ★Star Guitar	Markie Sizk	5:09
3.	"Walk ~To the Future~"	Kazuhito Kikuchi	Hiroo Yamaguchi	5:37
Total length:				15:44

DVD
No.	Title	Length
1.	"Suki de, Suki de, Suki de." (Music Video)
2.	"Anata Dake ga" (Music video)
3.	"Walk ~To the Future~" (Music video)

== Charts ==
"Suki de, Suki de, Suki de"
Chart (2010)	Peak position
Japan (Japan Hot 100)	2
Japan (Oricon)	2
Japan Adult Contemporary (Billboard)	12
Japan Digital (RIAJ)	1

"Anata Dake ga"
Chart (2010)	Peak position
Japan (Oricon)	2
Japan Digital (RIAJ)	5

== Certifications ==
Region	Certification	Certified units/sales
Japan (RIAJ) Physical single	Gold	100,000^{^}
Japan (RIAJ) Suki de, Suki de, Suki de (digital)	2× Platinum	500,000^{*}
Japan (RIAJ) Anata Dake ga (digital)	Platinum	250,000^{*}
^{*} Sales figures based on certification alone.^{^} Shipments figures based on certification alone.

== Release history ==
Region	Date	Format	Ref.
Japan	September 15, 2010	Cellphone download ("Suki de, Suki de, Suki de.")	
Japan	September 22, 2010	CD single, digital download	
Taiwan	September 24, 2010	CD single	
Hong Kong	September 28, 2010	CD single	
