= Maze (song) =

Single by Koda Kumi

from the album Grow into One
- B-side: "one"
- Released: December 11, 2002 (JP)
- Genre: J-pop
- Length: 11:46
- Label: Rhythm Zone; RZCD-45065 (Japan, CD)
- Songwriters: Kenn Kato (words "Maze"); Hiroo Yamaguchi & 813 (music; "Maze"); Kumi Koda (words; "One"); Lisa (words & music; "One")

Koda Kumi singles chronology
"Love Across the Ocean" (2002)	"Maze" (2002)	"Real Emotion/1000 no Kotoba" (2003)

Music video
- "Maze" on YouTube

"Maze" (stylized as "m•a•z•e") is a song recorded by Japanese singer-songwriter Koda Kumi. It was released on 11 December 2002 through Rhythm Zone as the third single from her second studio album Grow into One (2003). The single charted at #25 on Oricon and stayed on the charts for five weeks.

== Information ==
m•a•z•e is Koda's sixth domestic single under the Avex sub-label Rhythm Zone. It charted at #25 on the Oricon Weekly charts and, despite the low charting, remained on the charts for five weeks. The single was her second single released for her studio album, grow into one.

The single's b-side, "one," featured Japanese R&B singer LISA, who would later feature both Koda and the Heartsdales in her song "Switch." Both Koda and the Heartsdales would also be featured in the music video, which carried a futuristic, but grunge-looking Tokyo. "one" was also placed on the corresponding album, grow into one. Despite LISA being in the song, the track listing on the back covers of the single did not list her as the featured artist.

Both "m•a•z•e" and "one" made it to the album grow into one, but only "m•a•z•e" had its own music video placed on the DVD 7 Spirits.

In 2015, thirteen years after the single's release, Koda performed the song "one" with LISA live during her 15th Anniversary Premium Live at a-nation island.

== Promotions ==
"m•a•z•e" was used during a scene in the NTV drama Psycho Doctor (サイコドクター / SAIKODOKUTAA). Due to this, the music video for the track would center around psychology and psychosis.

== Music video ==
The music video for "m•a•z•e" has a psychological theme, with Koda being evaluated by a male psychologist. Throughout the video, Koda hallucinates seeing the psychologist and his assistant performing odd tasks and experiments, which seem to be triggered from the disturbing images she is shown. At the end of the video, she is seen walking to board a plane to escape from her own psychosis. The theme for the music video was inspired by the song being used in the Japanese drama Psycho Doctor.

== Track listing ==
(Source)

CD
No.	Title	Lyrics	Music	Arrangers	Length
1.	"m•a•z•e"	Kenn Kato	813 • h-wonder	Yamaguchi Hiroshi	4:06
2.	"one feat. LISA"	Koda Kumi • LISA	Yamaki Ryuichiro	LISA	3:33
3.	"m•a•z•e" (L12 Remix)	Kenn Kato	L12	Yamaguchi Hiroshi	6:38

== Charts (Japan) ==
Release	Chart	Peak position	Chart run	Total sales
December 11, 2002	Oricon Daily Singles Chart	25		7,713
December 11, 2002	Oricon Weekly Singles Chart	25	4 weeks	12,816

== Alternate versions ==
m•a•z•e

1. m•a•z•e: Found on the single (2002) and corresponding album Grow Into One (2003)
2. m•a•z•e [L12 Remix]: Found on the single (2002)
3. m•a•z•e [UNITED COLORS Remix]: Found on Koda Kumi Driving Hit's 3 (2011)
