= The Meaning of Peace =

Single by Koda Kumi & BoA

from the album Song Nation, Best: First Things, Listen to My Heart, Out Works & Collaboration Best
- Released: December 19, 2001
- Genre: J-pop
- Length: 5:04
- Label: Avex Trax
- Songwriter(s): Tetsuya Komuro
- Producer(s): Tetsuya Komuro

Koda Kumi singles chronology
"Color of Soul" (2001)	"The Meaning of Peace" (2001)	"So into You" (2002)

BoA singles chronology
"Kimochi wa Tsutawaru" (2001)	"The Meaning of Peace" (2001)	"Listen to My Heart" (2002)

"The Meaning of Peace" (stylized in lower case) is a single by Japanese R&B singer-songwriter Koda Kumi and South Korean pop singer-songwriter BoA. The single debuted on Oricon and No. 12 and remained on the charts for twelve weeks.

== Information ==
the meaning of peace is a collaborative effort between Japanese artist Kumi Koda and Korean artist BoA. The single peaked at No. 12 on the Oricon charts and charted for twelve weeks.

The single was done for the Song Nation project, which was created to help raise funds for the September 11 attacks in the United States on September 11, 2001, and to honor the victims. All earnings from the singles and the corresponding album, Various Artists Featuring song+nation, were donated to the September 11 Relief Fund.

Other artists under the Avex label also collaborated for the project, with all songs produced by Tetsuya Komuro. Those included were:

1. a song is born by Ayumi Hamasaki and Keiko
2. Lovin' It by VERBAL of m-flo and Namie Amuro
3. in case of me by Kaori Mochida
4. again by Tomiko Van
5. My Planet by hitomi

A remix for the meaning of peace was later placed on the album song+nation2 trance.

Both Kumi and BoA would release their own solo versions of the song on separate singles and/or album. BoA released her solo version on her Listen to My Heart album in 2002. Kumi released her solo version on her single love across the ocean (2002) and as a bonus track on her first greatest hits album Best ~first things~ (2005).

== Track listing ==
All tracks are written by Tetsuya Komuro

CD
No.	Title	Length
1.	"The Meaning of Peace" (Original Mix)	5:01
2.	"The Meaning of Peace" (TV Mix)	5:05
Total length:		10:06

== Chart history ==
- Debut position: 12
- Peak position: 12
- Weeks in top 200: 6

=== Sales ===
- First week estimate: 23,230
- Total estimate: 66,840

== Alternate versions ==
Both Koda Kumi and BoA had their own renditions of the track released by themselves:

=== BoA ===
1. the meaning of peace [Original Version]: Found on the single (2001)
2. the meaning of peace [TV Mix]: Found on the single (2001)
3. the meaning of peace [Tatsumaki Remix]: Found on song+nation2 trance (2002)
4. the meaning of peace [Album Version]: Found on LISTEN TO MY HEART (2002)

=== Koda Kumi ===
1. the meaning of peace [Original Version]: Found on the single (2001)
2. the meaning of peace [TV Mix]: Found on the single (2001)
3. the meaning of peace [Tatsumaki Remix]: Found on song+nation2 trance (2002)
4. the meaning of peace: Found on single Love Across the Ocean (2002)
5. the meaning of peace [Instrumental]: Found on single Love Across the Ocean (2002)
