= Real Emotion / 1000 no Kotoba =

Single by Koda Kumi

from the album Grow into One
- Language: Japanese
- Released: March 5, 2003
- Recorded: 2002
- Genre: J-pop
- Length: 20:02
- Label: Rhythm Zone
- Composer(s): Kazuhiro Hara; H-wonder; Takahito Eguchi; Noriko Matsueda
- Lyricist(s): Kenn Kato; Kazushige Nojima

Koda Kumi singles chronology
"Maze" (2002)	"Real Emotion / 1000 no Kotoba" (2003)	"Come with Me" (2003)

Music video
- "real Emotion" on YouTube

"Real Emotion" / "1000 no Kotoba" (1000の言葉, Sen no Kotoba; lit. "1000 Words") is the seventh single by Japanese singer-songwriter Koda Kumi, released as a double A-side single. Both "Real Emotion" and "1000 no Kotoba (1000 Words)" were featured in the video game Final Fantasy X-2, of which Koda provided the voice to the character Lenne.

This was Koda's first single to chart in the top 10 on Oricon, coming in at No. 3. Since its release, it has sold over 283,000 copies.

== Background and release ==
"1000 no Kotoba" was arranged by Takahito Eguchi and Noriko Matsueda, who arranged much of the music for Final Fantasy X-2. It was published by Rhythm Zone on March 5, 2003, with the catalog number "RZCD-45080". An orchestra version was included in limited editions of her album Grow into One as a bonus track, which played during the credits of X-2. The song was also included on the game's soundtrack, Final Fantasy X-2 Original Soundtrack. Koda Kumi released an alternate orchestra version on her third compilation album, Best ~Bounce & Lovers~, in 2007.

Concerning the single's release, Koda had said: "If this song doesn't sell, it means that I don't have what it takes to be an artist. If that happens, then I'll give up with good grace". After the chart failures of her past singles, Koda Kumi decided that the single would decide her fate as an artist. When the single had a high success rate on the charts, Kumi felt that it was the starting point of her career, but grew discouraged when the following singles didn't chart well: "Once people will listen to my songs, I will certainly be able to keep their interest. Because my hopes had been so high, the fall was really too hard".

"Real Emotion" / "1000 no Kotoba" became the artist's first the chart in the top ten on the weekly Oricon Singles Charts, charting at No. 3, and remained on the charts for twenty-eight weeks. Since its release, it has sold over 283,000 copies. She would not have another single surpass the physical sales of "Real Emotion/1000 no Kotoba" until her 2006 single "4 Hot Wave".

Final Fantasy X-2 single was released under Avex with the title "Kuon: Memories of Waves and Light" in November 2003. The single contained three tracks: "Kuon: Memories of Waves and Light", "Besaid", and "Yuna's Ballad".

== Music video ==
"Real Emotion" had a music video, appearing in the DVD 7 Spirits, and released alongside her corresponding album Grow into One.

This would be the first time an artist took part in creating the dance for a video game, with Kumi's dance being digitized into the game for the opening number. The music video showed aspects of creating the in-game video, with Kumi on the platform that would be used to track her movements and layer them over the performing character.

=== Appearance in Final Fantasy X-2 ===
"Real Emotion" was used as the opening song for the Square Enix role-playing video game Final Fantasy X-2 as Yuna, a returning protagonist from Final Fantasy X, performs the song during the opening full motion video cutscene at the blitzball stadium in Luca in the world of Spira. However, it is soon shown that in fact, it is Leblanc, a rival sphere hunter posing as Yuna after stealing her Songstress dressphere. Yuna performs the song using both Kumi's voice and dancing (the latter overlapped and digitized on).

While "1000 no Kotoba (1000 Words)" was considered an A-side, the song did not receive an official music video. Instead, it received a music video in the game. The music video for the song was of the Yuna character singing the song in the Thunder Plains. In the segment, Yuna sings the love song, written by the character Lenne – the basis of her Songstress dressphere – to her lover, Shuyin – both who had died 1000 years ago in Zanarkand. During the scene, it shows the couples' backstory of how the two were killed by guards of Bevelle in front of the weapon Vegnagun. Lenne's song was written to reflect the "1000 words over 1000 years" she was never able to tell Shuyin.

While Kumi performs the Japanese versions of "Real Emotion" and "1000 no Kotoba (1000 Words)", Jade Villalon of Sweetbox performs the English versions available in the North American and international versions. Villalon's full versions of the songs were included in the Japanese release of Sweetbox's album Adagio.

== Reception ==
"Real Emotion/1000 no Kotoba" peaked at number three on the Oricon Singles Chart, becoming Koda's first top ten single on the chart. Since its release, it has sold over 283,000 copies.

== Track listing ==
No.	Title	Lyrics	Music	Arrangement	Length
1.	"Real Emotion" (original mix)	Kenn Kato	Kazuhiro Hara	h-wonder	4:02
2.	"1000 no Kotoba" (original mix)	Kazushige Nojima	Takahito Eguchi; Noriko Matsueda	Eguchi; Matsueda	6:02
3.	"Real Emotion" (instrumental)		Kazuhiro	h-wonder	3:59
4.	"1000 no Kotoba" (instrumental)		Eguchi; Matsueda	Eguchi; Matsueda	6:02
Total length:					20:05

== Alternate versions ==
Real Emotion

- "Real Emotion (Instrumental)" – "Real Emotion/1000 no Kotoba" (2003)
- "Real Emotion (FFX-2 Mix)" – Final Fantasy X-2: Original Soundtrack (2003)
- "Real Emotion (English version)" – "Come with Me" (2003)
- "Real Emotion (DJ MSK remix)" – "Come with Me" (2003)
- "Real Emotion (House Nation Sunset in Ibiza Remix)" – Koda Kumi Driving Hit's (2009)
- "Real Emotion (KOZM® Remix)" – Koda Kumi Driving Hit's 5 (2013)
- "Real Emotion (TeddyLoid Remix)" – Koda Kumi Driving Hit's 8 (2018)

1000 no Kotoba

- "1000 no Kotoba (Instrumental)" – "Real Emotion/1000 no Kotoba" (2003)
- "1000 no Kotoba (FFX-2 Mix)" – Final Fantasy X-2: Original Soundtrack (2003)
- "1000 no Kotoba (Piano version) – A Wish That Spans the Ages" – Final Fantasy X-2: Original Soundtrack (2003)
- "1000 no Kotoba (Orchestra version)" – Final Fantasy X-2: Original Soundtrack (2003)
- "1000 no Kotoba (English version)" – "Come with Me" (2003)
- "1000 no Kotoba (DJ 19 remix)" – "Come with Me" (2003)
- "1000 no Kotoba (Alternate Orchestra version)" – Grow into One (2003)
- "1000 no Kotoba (Shohei Matsumoto & Junichi Matsuda Remix)" – Koda Kumi Driving Hit's 2 (2010)
