= Butterfly (Koda Kumi song) =

Single by Koda Kumi

from the album Best: First Things
- Released: June 22, 2005 (JP)
- Genre: J-pop, Bossa-Nova
- Length: 25:03
- Label: Rhythm Zone; RZCD-45213/B (Japan, CD+DVD); RZCD-45214 (Japan, CD)
- Songwriters: Koda Kumi, Miki Watanabe

Koda Kumi singles chronology
"Hot Stuff" (2005)	"Butterfly" (2005)	"Flower" (2005)

Music video
- "Butterfly" on YouTube

"Butterfly" is Japanese pop musician Koda Kumi's sixteenth domestic single. The single came in CD and CD+DVD, with the latter editions containing a foldout poster. Because her previous single "Hot Stuff feat. KM-MARKIT" was re-cut to become the final single for secret, "Butterfly" became the first single for Best ~first things~.

The single became very successful for Kumi, causing Kumi's ero-kawaii style to become popular among the high school and young adult communities in Japan. The single would go on to win several awards, including "Best Video of the Year" and "Best Female Video".

== Information ==
"Butterfly" is Japanese singer-songwriter Koda Kumi's sixteenth single under the Avex sub-label Rhythm Zone. The single was her first to debut at No. 1 on the Oricon charts and remained on the charts for twenty-two weeks. Although the single debuted at No. 1, it dropped to No. 2 for the weekly ranking.

The single also became the first to be released for her Best ~first things~ compilation album, although "Hot Stuff feat. KM-MARKIT" was released after her secret album's initial release. However, "Hot Stuff" was put on secret's special edition, which was released two months later.

"Butterfly" won the forty-seventh position at the Japan Record Award and placed fifty-sixth at NHK Red & White Singing Contest for the year. The song was also used as the theme song for the Japanese drama Kosume no Mahou 2 (Cosmetic Magic 2).

The B-side, "Taisetsu na kimi e", (大切な君へ / Important to you) was certified gold in full-length cellphone downloads. The other B-side, "Your Sunshine", while gaining no certifications, was used for Nivea's UV Body Whitening.

Because of the single's success, it made Kumi's ero-kawaii style spread across the high school community. The song had the overall concept of "all women will always be beautiful". It also became very popular among the karaoke community, even being parodied by many Japanese comedians.

== Promotional advertisements ==
"Butterfly" was the theme of TBS's drama Kosume no Mahou 2 (コスメの魔法2 / Cosmetic Magic 2).

"Your Sunshine" was used in a televised advertisement for Nivea's Medicated Body Whitening UV (ニベアボディ 薬用ホワイトニングUV / BODI Yakuyou HOWAITONINGU UV).

== Packaging ==
"Butterfly" was released in both CD and CD+DVD formats:

- CD: contains six musical tracks.
- CD+DVD: contains six musical tracks, one music video, one making video and a foldout poster.

Both the CD and CD+DVD editions contained different cover art, with Kumi being intimate with an unknown man. The CD+DVD versions included a foldout poster.

== Music video ==
Scene in "Butterfly" video with Kumi shown in a high school hallway.

The music video for "Butterfly" carried a theme of empowerment, with the overall message of not being nervous to take control of any situation and that "all women are beautiful".

The song and video's popularity caused Kumi's ero-kawaii style to become popular among the female high school and young adult community in Japan. This may have been due in part to the dance segment of the video, which was performed in a school hallway with Kumi dressed as an instructor. In the scene, both men and women dance provocatively alone and together.

Other scenes in the video included Kumi on a stage as blue morpho butterfly wings protruded from her back and a scene in which she and two others perform a wash for motorcycles.

== Awards ==
In December 2005, Koda Kumi won the 47th Japan Record Awards for the song "Butterfly".

In May 2006, Kumi won two awards at MTV Video Music Awards Japan 2006 for the categories "Best Video of the Year" and "Best Female Video."

== Track listing ==
=== CD ===
CD
No.	Title	Lyrics	Music	Length
1.	"Butterfly"	Koda Kumi	Miki Watanabe	4:20
2.	"Your Sunshine"	Koda Kumi	Junpei Takada • Toru Watanabe	3:45
3.	"Taisetsu na kimi e (大切な君へ)"	Koda Kumi	Daisuke "DAIS" Miyachi • Yuichi Ohno	4:34
4.	"Butterfly" (Instrumental)		Miki Watanabe	4:20
5.	"Your Sunshine" (Instrumental)		Junpei Takada • Toru Watanabe	3:44
6.	"Taisetsu na kimi e" (Instrumental)		Daisuke "DAIS" Miyachi • Yuichi Ohno	4:30

=== DVD ===
DVD
No.	Title	Music	Length
1.	"Butterfly" (Music Video)	Shigeaki Kubo	4:40
2.	"Butterfly" (Making Video)	Shigeaki Kubo	4:55

== Chart history ==
Chart (2005)	Peak position
Oricon Weekly Singles Top 200	2
Chart (2006)	Peak position
Oricon 2005 Singles Top 999	85

=== Sales ===
- First week estimate: 45,303
- Total estimate: 125,662

== Alternate versions ==
Butterfly

1. Butterfly: Found on the single and corresponding album Best ~first things~ (2005)
2. Butterfly [Instrumental]: Found on the single (2005)
3. Butterfly [Prog5 Mirrorball Remix]: Found on Koda Kumi Driving Hit's (2009)
4. Butterfly [TeddyLoid Remix]: Found on Koda Kumi Driving Hit's 4 (2012)

Taisetsu na kimi e

1. Taisetsu na kimi e: Found on the single (2005) and album BEST ~BOUNCE & LOVERS~ (2007)
2. Taisetsu na kimi e [Instrumental]: Found on the single (2005)
3. Taisetsu na kimi e [Ryuzo Remix]: Found on Koda Kumi Driving Hit's 2 (2010)

Preceded by "Sign" (Mr. Children)	Japan Record Award Grand Prix; 2005	Succeeded by "Ikken" (Kiyoshi Hikawa)
