= Take Back =

Single by Koda Kumi

from the album Affection
- B-side: "Your Song"
- Released: December 6, 2000; May 22, 2001 (US)
- Recorded: 2000
- Studio: Avex Studios (Tokyo); On Air Azabu Studios (Tokyo)
- Genre: Dance-pop; R&B
- Length: 4:58
- Label: Rhythm Zone; Avex Music Creative Inc.
- Songwriter: Koda
- Producer: Max Matsuura

Koda Kumi singles chronology
"Take Back" (2000)	"Trust Your Love" (2001)

Music video
- "Take Back" on YouTube

"Take Back" is a song recorded by Japanese singer-songwriter Koda Kumi as her debut and lead single from her first studio album Affection (2002). It was released on December 6, 2000 via Rhythm Zone in two physical editions; a CD single and 12" vinyl. Additionally, Sounday and Orpheus Records distributed the song in North America in May 2001 with four more formats, but was remixed as a dance number by Jonathan Peters. The track was written by Koda herself, composed by Kazuhito Kikuchi and produced by Max Matsuura. The result was finalized after she had won a competition to find another artist for the Avex Trax company, which later published Rhythm Zone under Matsuura's guidance.

Musically, "Take Back" is an R&B number that incorporates elements of pop and electronic instrumentation, such as keyboards and synthesizers. Koda's inspiration towards the track was based on her interest with J-pop, and their revolving culture with the R&B scene, particularly with her admiration of label mate M-flo. Because an English version was adapted for the Jonathan Peters' remix, she re-wrote it with Kikuchi. Upon its release, the single received positive reviews from music critics, who commended the sound and production, but understood its lack of general interest with the Japanese market.

Commercially, "Take Back" experienced minimal success in Japan, reaching number 59 on the Oricon Singles Chart. Despite its lower peak, it fared better in the United States, where it charted inside the Dance Club Songs, Dance/Electronic Singles Sales and Hot Single Sales categories, all published by Billboard. In order to promote the single, Koda featured in its accompanying music video, directed by Toku, which featured her in various rooms with back-up dancers and singing the track. Furthermore, the singer performed it on various concert tours such as Best: First Things Live, Black Cherry and her 10th Anniversary tour, and made an appearance on her greatest hits album Best: First Things (2004).

== Background and conception ==
"My debut day had already been decided but I didn't know, so I felt insecure and thought 'will that song I recorded be put on sale?' (laughs). When I saw my CD lined up the stores I felt 'I really debuted!' for the first time. I still remember how excited I was."

—Koda on the release of "Take Back".

In 2000, Koda auditioned for the Avex Trax competition "Dream Audition", and came second out of 120,000 female participants. Subsequently, Avex employed Japanese producer Max Matsuura to start-up a new sub-label in 1999, named Rhythm Zone, whilst still working with frequent female collaborators Ayumi Hamasaki and Namie Amuro. That same year, Avex appointed Koda to Matsuura, and he eventually signed her to the label that same year. Her label had hired composer and arranger Kazuhito Kikuchi to compose "Take Back", but Avex instructed Koda to take singing lessons every weekend in Tokyo, Japan before recording it. At that time, she stated that she didn't feel "anxious" about the situation, having already spent 500,000 yen (approximately $4056 USD) she won from the open audition towards food.

However, Avex refused to promote Koda's work equally due to her excessive weight gain, and claims of her being "ugly". Matsuura was also unimpressed by Koda's image, declaring that they had tried to look for "the best one" for their label. Later on the stages, Avex executives threatened to fire Koda if no improvements were put into place, which she eventually did but wasn't notified until her single "Real Emotion/1000 no Kotoba". In mid 2000, Kumi was asked by Avex to make her promotional debut through a photo shoot with photographer Toku, which led to the shooting of the cover sleeve for "Take Back". The artwork features her sporting a red and gold outfit, standing outside of a tunnel. According to Toku, he said "during the shooting of the cover for [her] single, 'Take Back', no one had told [her] what the shoot was for, so [she] just stood in front of the camera clueless".

== Composition ==
"Take Back" was written by Koda herself, composed by Kazuhito Kikuchi and produced by Max Matsuura. It was recorded at Avex and On Air Azabu Studios in Tokyo, Japan through mid-2000, whilst the sound and arrangement was handled by H-wonder. Musically, it is an R&B number that incorporates elements of pop and electronic instrumentation, such as keyboards and synthesizers. In a biographic article by Yahoo! Music Japan, an editor described it as a "blend of pop and R&B". Similarly, Seth Figlerowicz called it a "soft R&B and pop song." During an interview with Nippop, Koda said her earlier work was strictly R&B. Through the early stages of the song's parent album Affection, she had only listened to Japanese music and enjoyed reading the lyrics. The singer also expressed her admiration for fellow label mate M-flo, who was heavily into R&B, and wanted to "emulate" his style. However, executives at Rhythm Zone and Avex instructed her to infuse Western music into her work for a much wider musical influence, as she refused to approach the style at the start. For the North American release, Koda re-recorded the song in English, and it was remixed by American DJ and producer Jonathan Peters. According to Koda, "[they] hadn't really intended to release [the remix], but remixes were all the rage then". Particularly, Avex's New York office confessed that they thought the remix would do well thought the club scene.

== Reception ==
"Take Back" received positive reviews from music critics. In an article of Jame World, Seth Figlerowicz was positive towards its sound, labelling it very "pleasant". However, he did note that the composition was more suitable for the American audience than the Japanese music scene, hence the lack of success and "commercial appeal" in the latter region. Similarly, a contributing editor of CD Journal praised the song's longevity and R&B sound, and labelled it "impressive". An editor from Yahoo! Music Japan wrote on Koda's biography that the mixture of pop and R&B music was a "perfect balance of contemporary charm and vocals." Adam Greenberg, a writer of AllMusic, did not mention the original recording, but wrote about the Sunset in Ibiza remix from her remix album Koda Kumi Driving Hit's (2006), and stated: "When the DJs complement her voice just right, Koda can sound like any number of other singers. [...] "Real Emotion" and "Take Back" come out as something very similar to Ayumi Hamasaki's works."

Upon its release, Koda felt insecure about the singles commercial performance, fearing about its first week sales and peak position. To an extent, "Take Back" experienced minor impact in Japan. It debuted at number 62 on the weekly Oricon Singles Chart with over 4,000 units sold in its first week, and peaked at number 59 in its following charting phase. Oricon ranked the song as her lowest-performing single on their chart, and is one of her only singles to miss the top 40; it has sold over 22,680 units in that region. Similarly, it opened at number 66 on the Count Down TV chart and peaked at number 63 the following week.

In the United States, the Jonathan Peter's remix in English experienced success on the Billboard charts. The single entered the Dance Club Songs chart at number 33, making her one of the first Japanese acts to enter on any Billboard affiliated chart in years. The remix move 15 positions forward to its peak position of number 18, and was reconginized as the "greatest gainer"—dated on May 5, 2001; it spent 13 weeks inside the top 50. "Take Back" reached number 10 on the US Hot Dance Music/Maxi-Singles Sales chart, making her the first Japanese artist to achieve a top ten rank on that chart. Additionally, the maxi single spent a sole week at number 20 on the Hot Singles Sales chart. However, the original mix in Japanese is available to stream on services such as Apple Music and Spotify.

== Music video ==
Still from the music video of "Take Back", showing Koda seated in front of a multi-coloured LED wall.

The accompanying music video for "Take Back" was directed by Toku, and took one day to shoot and two days to edit. According to Seth Figlerowicz, who reviewed the singers' DVD compilation 7 Spirits, the video opens with a "young Koda Kumi that has long and black hair. She presents herself in this video in two different ways. In the first one, though wearing a leather dress, she looks natural, gentle and pretty. In the latter one, she is presented with disheveled hair and strange things plaited in it, but despite that, she still attracts the viewer's attention with her enthusiasm flowing out from the screen." In the video, Koda is accompanied by her three fellow background dancers; they are dancing in a white photo shoot room, while she is sitting in a white chair. Seth Figlerowicz stated that the dancers complimented the early 2000s music video era: "there are only three dancers near the singer, so it probably wouldn't distinguish from other PVs of the same era." Scenes interspersed through the main video show Koda lying nude on a crimson red Ferrari and clutching a microphone in her hand. Seth Figlerowicz commented that the video, in conjunction with her other videos on 7 Spirits, "didn't appeal to the Japanese audience's tastes [...]. With some time, people's opinions of them might change, but they are worth taking a look at.

== Live performances and other appearances ==
"Take Back" has been included on numerous track lists of tours conducted by Koda Kumi. She included the single on her Secret First Class Limited Live tour, Koda Kumi Live Tour 2005: First Things tour, Live Tour 2007: Black Cherry, 10th Anniversary tour, her 2009 Taiwan concert tour, and the Premium Show: Love and Songs tour. The track was featured on Koda's 2005 greatest hits album, Best: First Things. "Take Back" was featured in the televised advertisement for Kracie's Hada-bisei facials.

== Track listing ==
- Japanese 12 inch Vinyl
1. "Take Back" (Main Club Mix) – 4:46
2. "Your Song" (Original Mix) – 5:20
- US 12 inch Vinyl
1. "Take Back" (Junior's Pop Club Anthem) – 7:07
2. "Take Back" (Junior's Dub Anthem) – 7:07
3. "Take Back" (Jonathan Peters' Club Mix) – 6:29
4. "Take Back" (Jonathan Peters' Sound Factory Dub) – 10:26
- US Maxi-single
1. "Take Back" (Jonathan Peters' Radio Mix) – 3:31
2. "Take Back" (Hex Hector Main Radio Remix)
3. "Take Back" (Junior's Radio Mix) – 3:47
4. "Take Back" (C. "Tricky" Stewart Remix) – 4:38
5. "Take Back" (Hex Hector Main Club Remix)
6. "Take Back" (Jonathan Peters' Club Mix) – 6:29
7. "Take Back" (Junior's Pop Club Anthem) – 7:07
8. "Take Back" (Junior's Pop Dub Anthem) – 7:07
9. "Take Back" (Jonathan Peters' Sound Factory Dub) – 10:26
10. "Take Back" (Hex Hector Dub Remix) – 7:43
- Japanese CD single
1. "Take Back" (Original Mix) – 4:57
2. "Your Song" (Original Mix) – 5:20
3. "Take Back" (C. "Tricky" Stewart Remix) – 4:38
4. "Take Back" (Daylight Remix) – 4:28
5. "Take Back" (Instrumental) – 4:57
6. "Your Song" (Instrumental) – 5:20
- US CD Single
1. "Take Back" (Jonathan Peters' Radio Mix) – 3:31
2. "Take Back" (Junior's Radio Mix) – 3:47
3. "Take Back" (C. "Tricky" Stewart Remix) – 4:38
4. "Take Back" (Jonathan Peters' Club Mix) – 6:29
5. "Take Back" (Junior's Pop Club Anthem) – 7:07
6. "Take Back" (Jonathan Peters' Sound Factory Dub) – 10:26
- Take Back/Trust Your Love Blackwatch Remix 12" Vinyl
1. "Trust Your Love" (Blackwatch Remix) – 7:49
2. "Take Back" (Blackwatch Remix) – 7:29

== Credits and personnel ==
Credits adapted from the liner notes of Affection.

- Koda Kumi – vocals, background vocals, songwriting
- Max Matsuura – producer
- Kazuhito Kikuchi – producer, composer
- H-Wonder – arranger, composer
- Rhythm Zone – management, label
- Avex Trax – parent label, management

== Charts and sales ==
=== Weekly charts ===
Chart (2000–2002)	Peak position
Japan (Oricon)	59
US Dance Club Songs (Billboard)	18
US Hot Dance Music/Maxi-Singles Sales (Billboard)	10
US Hot Singles Sales (Billboard)	20

=== Sales ===
Region	Certification	Certified units/sales
Japan (RIAJ)	None	22,680
