= H-Wonder =

Japanese music arranger and composer (born 1968)

H-wonder
- Born: September 23, 1968 (age 57)
- Origin: Funabashi, Chiba, Japan
- Genres: J-Pop
- Occupation(s): Composer, singer
- Years active: 1995–1998 (as singer); 1998–present (as composer)
- Labels: Scoop Music

H-Wonder is a Japanese music arranger and composer. He debuted in 1995. In June 1998, he stopped being a solo artist and changed his name to H-Wonder and became a composer. One of his notable collaborations is with Maaya Sakamoto and BoA.

== Discography ==
=== Singles ===
- Subete Konomama Dakishimereba - 24 March 1995
- Ready Steady Go! - 23 August 1995
- Mystic Eyes - 24 April 1996 (Ending theme for the anime series The Vision of Escaflowne)
- Sugita Koi no Ato - 7 November 1996
- Dawn - 21 February 1997
- Chocolate Parfait - 17 December 1997
- Kitto Daijobu - 1 April 1998
- Happy - 30 September 1998 (Only sold in Hokkaido)

=== Albums ===
- Dawn-bright - 24 April 1997
- Wonder Hero 2: Brand New Atlas - 21 June 1996
- Wonder Hero - 21 April 1995

== Collaborations ==
- On/Off - Arranger
  - "Futatsu no Kodō to Akai Tsumi" (ふたつの鼓動と赤い罪) - Opening for Vampire Knight
- Maaya Sakamoto - Composer and arranger
  - "Loop" (ループ, Rūpu) - Ending for Tsubasa Chronicle
  - "Spica" (スピカ, Supika)
  - "Action!" - Opening theme for Clamp in Wonderland 2
  - "Fuyu Desuka?" (冬ですか?; "Is It Winter?")
  - "That is to Say!" - Follow me Up Album]
- BoA - Composer and arranger for some songs
  - "Every Heart (Minna no Kimochi)" - Arranger
  - "Beside You (Boku o Yobu Koe)" - Arranger
  - "Quincy" - Arranger
  - "Key of Heart" - Composer and arranger
  - "Beautiful Flowers" - Arranger
- Max - Arranger
  - "Spring Rain"
- Kōmi Hirose - Arranger
  - "Velvet"
  - "The Shining Story"
  - "Sayonara"
- Folder5 - Composer and arranger for some songs
  - "Fake" - Composer and arranger
  - "Magical Eyes (Mochi2wondermix)" - Arranger
- Koda Kumi - Arranger for some songs
  - "Cutie Honey" - Opening Theme Song for the anime Re: Cutie Honey
  - "into your heart" - Ending Theme Song for the anime Re: Cutie Honey
