= Best: Third Universe =

- Best: Third Universe only cover. Artwork that was included on the conjoined album Best: Third Universe & 8th Al. Universe.

Compilation album by Koda Kumi
- Released: February 3, 2010
- Recorded: 2005–2009
- Genre: Pop; R&B
- Length: 68:02
- Label: Avex Music Creative Inc.; Avex Trax; Avex Taiwan; Rhythm Zone; S.M. Entertainment

Koda Kumi chronology
UNIVERSE (2010)	Best: Third Universe (2010)	Koda Kumi Driving Hit's 2 (2010)

Best: Third Universe (stylized as BEST～third universe～) (Note: Although BEST ~third universe~ is the albums registered album title, its name has differed since its release with the greatest hits album Best: Third Universe. For its domestic releases, BEST ~third universe~ and the original album goes by the title; BEST ~third universe~ & 8th AL "Universe", Best ~Third Universe~ & 8th AL "Universe", and 8th AL "UNIVERSE". For international releases, Best: Third Universe and the greatest hits album goes by the title; Best – Third Universe & 8th AL Universe and Best: Third Universe & 8th Universe.) is the third greatest hits album by Japanese recording artist Koda Kumi. It was released as a double album with her eighth studio album Universe on February 3, 2010 by Rhythm Zone. The greatest hits album includes singles between May 2006 "Koi no Tsubomi" and her December 2008 single "Stay with Me", with a bonus disc with newly recorded material. As a double album, it was released in four different formats; a two album bundle, a two album and DVD bundle, a two album first pressing bundle, and a two album digital release. A fifth format was released, but only featured the compilation.

Upon its release, Best: Third Universe was met with generally positive reviews from music critics, many of whom complimented the vastness of Kumi's back catalogue and was noted as one of her strongest releases. Commercially, Best: Third Universe was a success. Charting together as a double album, Best: Third Universe and Universe became Koda's third and fourth number one compilation and studio album to reach the top spot on Japan's Oricon Albums Chart respectively. Best: Third Universe and Universe was certified platinum by the Recording Industry Association of Japan (RIAJ) for shipments of 250,000 units. It also charted in Taiwan, entering the top twenty on two competent charts. Koda promoted the album on her 2010 Universe Tour and her 10th Anniversary Tour, and followed up with remix albums; Koda Kumi Driving Hit's 2 and its third issue.

== Background and material ==
In early January 2010, Japanese recording artist Koda Kumi announced plans of releasing a double album. The double album was to promote both her third greatest hits album entitled Best: Third Universe, and a new studio album that consisted of unreleased material from recording sessions for her 2008 album, Trick. However, new material arose after completing her concert tours: The 2009 Trick Tour and her first Taiwanese concert tour. Best: Third Universe is Koda's first double album since her 2005 greatest hits album Best: First Things, which included single between her December 2000 debut "Take Back" and her May 2004 single "Cutie Honey", with a bonus disc with newly recorded material. Third Universe is also Koda's first double album to consist of a greatest hits and full-length studio album.

The material from Best: Third Universe includes singles between May 2006 "Koi no Tsubomi" and her December 2008 single "Stay with Me", with a bonus disc with newly recorded material. The recordings are sung in both English and Japanese language; "That Ain't Cool", a duet with American recording artist Fergie, is recorded in full English, while "Lady Go!" and "Taboo" are both bilingual tracks. (Note: According to the album notes and accompanying lyric sheet, there is one English ("That Ain't Cool"), two bilingual ("Lady Go!" and "Taboo") and thirteen Japanese tracks (the remaining album tracks).) (Note: Despite the two English tracks being identified as English songs, each of those songs include minor words in Japanese. This is similar to the other thirteen Japanese tracks, which includes minor English language. However, because the tracks overemphasize their respective languages in the lyric sheet provided by Rhythm Zone, Avex Trax, S.M. Entertainment, and Avex Taiwan, they are identified as their respective language tracks.) Each song is co-written by Koda, including the English and Japanese tracks. Both Best: Third Universe and Universe have been described as a J-pop album with numerous elements of dance-pop, rock, R&B, electropop, and pop ballad.

== Release and packaging ==
Best: Third Universe was released as a double album with Koda's eighth studio album Universe on February 3, 2010 by Rhythm Zone in four different formats. The double CD featured the sixteen greatest hits tracks and fourteen original tracks on two separate compact discs. The second first press issues featured a bonus track, the live version to "Moon Crying", and a bonus poster. The double CD and DVD bundle featured the sixteen greatest hits tracks and fourteen original tracks on two separate compact discs, and a bonus DVD, including the music videos for the lead singles from the greatest hits and all featured singles from Universe. This format also included the live version of "Moon Crying" and a bonus poster. The final format is the digital release, which was released worldwide. This format featured the sixteen greatest hits tracks and fourteen original tracks. A fifth format was released to promote both Best: Third Universe and Universe, but only included the greatest hits CD. However, a bonus booklet featured a website code to download short ringtones of all Universe tracks.

The six Best: Third Universe and Universe cover sleeves feature different images all photographed by Leslie Kee. The double album format has Koda looking towards the camera, holding up the booklet to her second greatest hits compilation Best: Second Session (2006). The double album and bonus DVD format has Koda drinking from a coffee mug, while sitting on a kitchen bench reading the booklet. Despite not being included on the compilation only format, the text "8th Al. Universe" is featured on the front cover, and has Koda holding up a strawberry. The digital release uses the double album as its front cover. Apart from the digital and compilation only release, each physical format features two booklets. The booklet front for Best: Third Universe has a close-up of Koda with long brown hair and minimal make-up. The Universe booklet was also issued, featuring a close-up of Koda with dark eye shadow, feathered jewellery and long false nails. The booklets and photo shoots were designed by members of United Lounge Tokyo, and the theme is immolating Koda's Best: Second Session photo shoot.

== Critical reception ==
Professional ratings
Review scores
Source	Rating
AllMusic (first review)	3.5/5 stars
AllMusic (second review)	3.5/5 stars
Hot Express	(positive)

Best: Third Universe received favourable reviews from most music critics. Adam Greenberg from AllMusic awarded the album three-and-a-half stars out of five. He commented "Kumi Koda has enough hits on her hands to fuel a whole series of greatest-hits compilations. Proving this, Best: Third Universe is actually a companion pair of albums. Best Third contains the various Oricon chart hits (and a few others) released since her last compilation – Best Second. The songs are well-produced, well-performed, perfectly in the realm of Koda's forte. She can slink, she can croon, she can run a massive dance tune with a heavy beat, and all are shown off with great effect on Best Third.

Ian Martin from the same publication awarded it three-and-a-half stars, opening by saying "Kumi Koda is a performer who divides opinion in her homeland, mocked and hated openly by many in Japan, and with many of her fans reluctant to admit to liking her." Martin later commented "Delving beneath Koda's image also reveals a generally high standard of music, albeit one that, for all the genre-hopping on display, never really strays too far from the blueprint of archetypal Avex Trax pop."

== Commercial performance ==
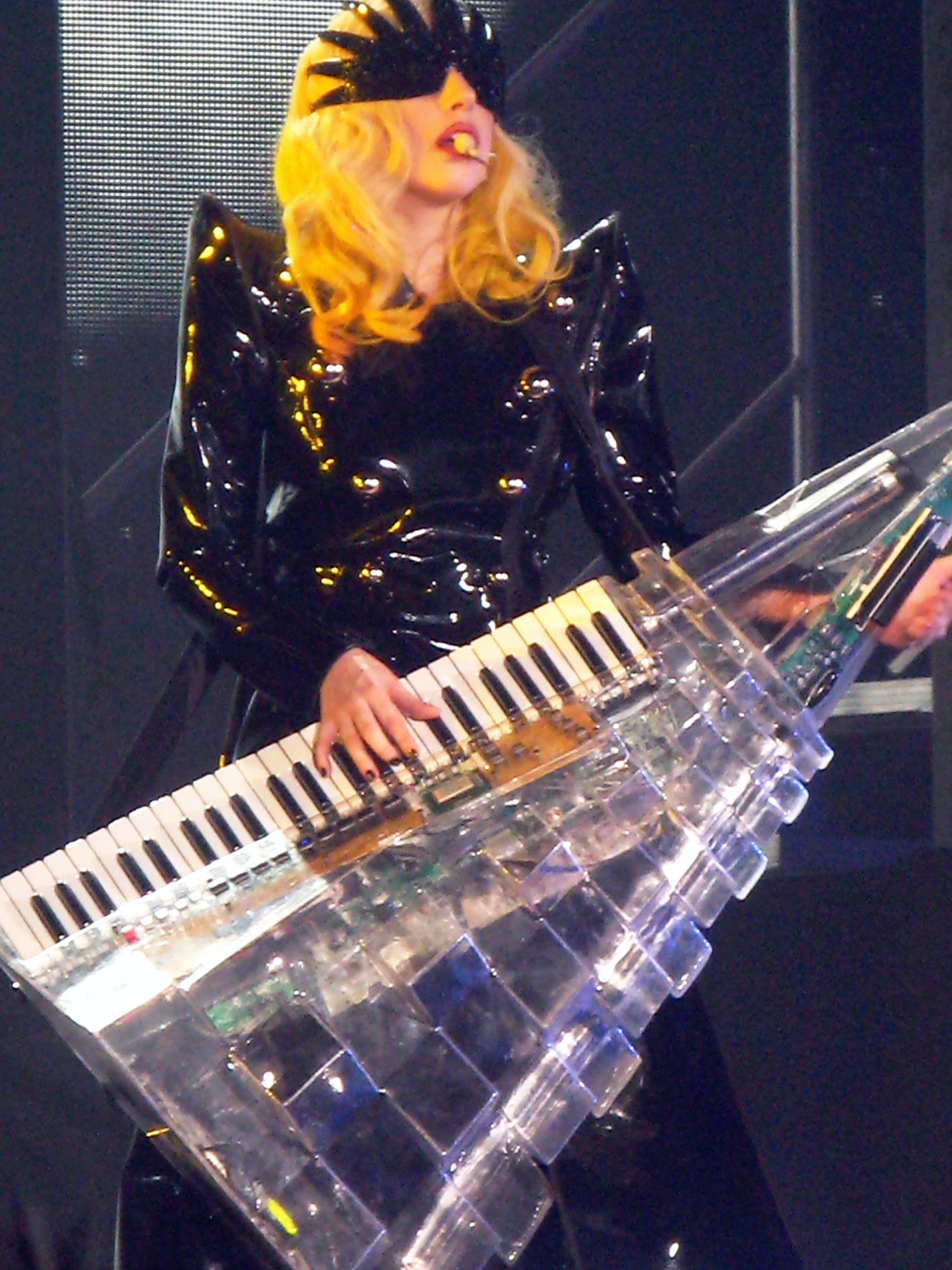
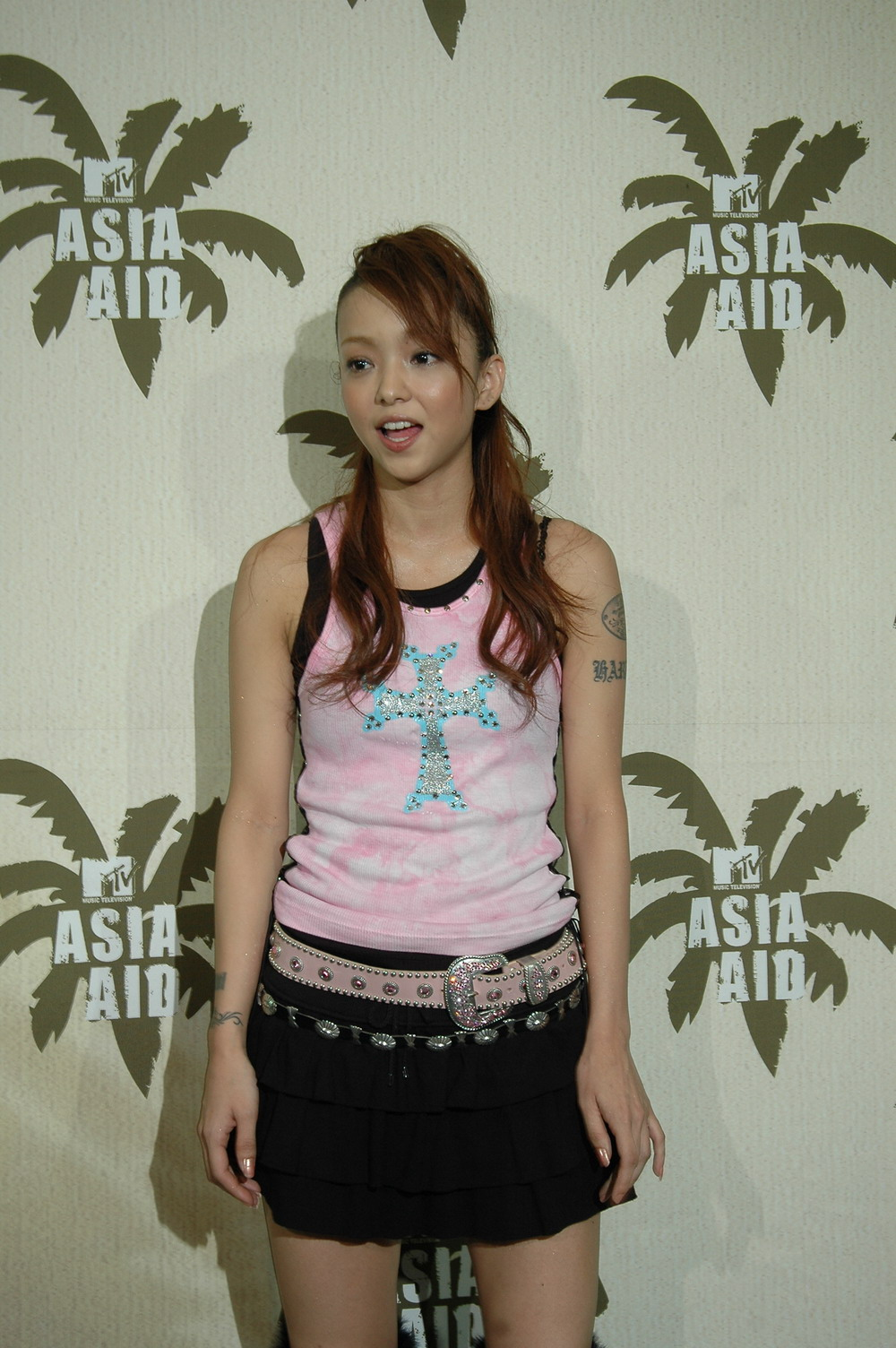
Despite selling over 372,000 units, Universe was only the fifth best selling album by a female artist. Lady Gaga's The Fame Monster (left) and Namie Amuro's Past Future (right) had beaten Koda's sales.

Charting together as a double album, Best: Third Universe and Universe debuted at number one on the Japanese Oricon Daily Albums Chart with 76,056 units sold, but slipped two number two for the rest of the week days. Despite this, Best: Third Universe and Universe debuted at number one on the Japanese Oricon Daily Weekly Chart with an estimated 221,887 first week sales. Both albums became Koda's third and fourth number one compilation and studio album to reach the top spot on the Oricon Albums Chart respectively. Despite this, Best: Third Universe and Universe became Koda's lowest selling greatest hits and studio album since Best: Second Session and Trick in first week sales; the former sold over 950,000, and the later sold over 250,000 units in its first week. It fell to three in its second week, shifting over 60,552 units. The album stayed inside the top ten for four weeks, selling over 325,000 units in its course. It spent fifteen weeks inside the top 100 chart, and 32 weeks in the top 300 chart. By the end of 2010, Best: Third Universe and Universe sold over 371,590 units and was ranked 18 on the Annual Oricon Yearly Albums Chart; this made Koda the fifth female artist on the chart, behind Lady Gaga, Kaela Kimura, Namie Amuro, and Kana Nishino. To date, Oricon's database has ranked Best: Third Universe and Universe as Koda's seventh best-selling album.

Best: Third Universe and Universe entered at number two on Japan's Billboard Top Albums Sales. Unable to reach the top spot, it slipped to number three the following week, and eventually stayed in the top 100 chart for 16 weeks; its final position was at 89. Best: Third Universe and Universe was certified platinum by the Recording Industry Association of Japan (RIAJ) for shipments of 250,000 units. To date, the album has sold over 372,002 units in Japan. Best: Third Universe and Universe also reached number 18 on the Taiwanese Albums Chart, and 4 their East Asian Albums Chart. (Note: The G-Music chart was established in July 2005 and only archives the top 20 releases.) (Note: Week references for G-Music: Bon Voyage 2010 week 6.) (Note: The G-Music chart was established in July 2005 and only archives the top 20 releases.) (Note: Week references for G-Music: Bon Voyage 2010 week 6.)

== Concert tours ==
To promote Universe and Best: Third Universe', Koda went on her 2010 Universe tour. The concert tour went throughout Japan, and the recurring theme was outer space and the shuttle used for the voyage (on all concert merchandise) was labelled Koda Airlines. The concert tour was released in two formats; a double-DVD bundle, and a Blu-ray release. The DVD reached number one on the Oricon DVD Chart, with over 67,078 units sold by 2010 and was ranked 27 on the Annual Oricon Yearly DVD Chart. Koda further promoted the album on her 10th Anniversary Tour. The concert tour was released in two formats; a double-DVD bundle, and a Blu-ray release. The DVD reached number one on the Oricon DVD Chart, with over 40,141 units sold by 2010 and was ranked 36 on the Annual Oricon Yearly DVD Chart.

== Track listing ==
Best: Third Universe album (CD 1).
No.	Title	Length
1.	"Koi no Tsubomi" (from Black Cherry)	4:06
2.	"I'll Be There" (from Black Cherry)	4:15
3.	"Ningyo Hime" (from Black Cherry)	4:25
4.	"With Your Smile" (from Black Cherry)	4:15
5.	"Yume no Uta" (from Black Cherry)	4:43
6.	"But" (from Kingdom)	3:37
7.	"Freaky" (from Kingdom)	3:18
8.	"Girls" (from Freaky)	4:37
9.	"Ai no Uta" (from Kingdom)	4:51
10.	"Last Angel" (feat. Tohoshinki; from Kingdom)	3:48
11.	"Anytime" (from Kingdom)	4:09
12.	"Moon Crying" (from Trick)	5:43
13.	"That Ain't Cool" (feat. Fergie; from Trick)	3:30
14.	"Lady Go!" (from Koda Kumi Driving Hit's)	4:02
15.	"Taboo" (from Trick)	3:50
16.	"Stay with Me" (from Trick)	4:53

=== Best: Third Universe & 8th Al. Universe track list ===
The Best: Third Universe and Universe collection premiered on February 3, 2010 as a double album. The listing below contains two formats; the original double album, and a bonus DVD format. The track list below details the personnel, credits, and performances from both Best: Third Universe and Universe, and not a stand-alone for Universe.

Best: Third Universe album (CD 1).
No.	Title	Length
1.	"Koi no Tsubomi" (from Black Cherry)	4:06
2.	"I'll Be There" (from Black Cherry)	4:15
3.	"Ningyo Hime" (from Black Cherry)	4:25
4.	"With Your Smile" (from Black Cherry)	4:15
5.	"Yume no Uta" (from Black Cherry)	4:43
6.	"But" (from Kingdom)	3:37
7.	"Freaky" (from Kingdom)	3:18
8.	"Girls" (from Freaky)	4:37
9.	"Ai no Uta" (from Kingdom)	4:51
10.	"Last Angel" (feat. Tohoshinki; from Kingdom)	3:48
11.	"Anytime" (from Kingdom)	4:09
12.	"Moon Crying" (from Trick)	5:43
13.	"That Ain't Cool" (feat. Fergie; from Trick)	3:30
14.	"Lady Go!" (from Koda Kumi Driving Hit's)	4:02
15.	"Taboo" (from Trick)	3:50
16.	"Stay with Me" (from Trick)	4:53

Universe album.
No.	Title	Lyrics	Music	Length
1.	"Step into My World"	Sty	Sty	2:59
2.	"Can We Go Back"	Kumi Koda; Adam Watts; Andy Dodd; Shanna Crooks	Watts; Dodds	3:23
3.	"Superstar"	Koda; Figge; Johan Lindman	Figge	3:19
4.	"You're So Beautiful"	Koda; Johan Fransson; Tim Larsson; Tobias Lundgren	Larsson	3:40
5.	"Lick Me"	Koda	Yoo	3:28
6.	"Work It Out!"	Koda; Dana Calitri; Nina Ossoff; Tommy Henriksen	Henriksen	3:46
7.	"No Way"	Koda	U-Key Zone	5:39
8.	"Stay"	Koda	Markie	4:10
9.	"Comes Up"	Koda; Yuuki	Yuuki	3:53
10.	"Physical Thing"	Koda; Hugo Lira; Ian-Paolo Lira; Negin; Nosheen; Thomas Gustafsson	Lira; Gustafsson; Lira	2:55
11.	"Ecstasy"	Hum	Hum	3:26
12.	"Universe"	Hiro	Hiro	3:33
13.	"It's All Love!" (Kumi Koda x Misono)	Koda; Misono Koda	Kenichi Maeyamada	4:55
14.	"Alive"	Koda	G.F. Handel; Taro Iwashiro	3:41
15.	"Moon Crying" (Live Version in Taiwan, First Press Track Only)	Koda	Miwa Furuse	7:47

DVD
No.	Title	Length
1.	"Koi no Tsubomi"	4:07
2.	"Ningyo Hime"	4:40
3.	"Yume no Uta"	5:06
4.	"But"	3:53
5.	"Freaky"	3:42
6.	"Ai no Uta"	4:40
7.	"Last Angel" (feat. Tohoshinki)	4:11
8.	"anytime"	4:14
9.	"Moon Crying"	6:31
10.	"Taboo"	4:09
11.	"Stay with Me"	5:09
12.	"It's All Love!" (Kumi Koda x Misono)	5:02
13.	"Lick Me"	3:39
14.	"Ecstasy"	3:35
15.	"Physical Thing"	3:09
16.	"Can We Go Back"	4:37
17.	"Superstar"	3:25
18.	"You're So Beautiful"	3:49

=== All formats ===
- Double album – Consists of sixteen greatest hits tracks on a first disc, and fourteen original tracks on a second disc.
- Double album & DVD – Consists of sixteen greatest hits tracks on a first disc, and fifteen original tracks on a second disc. DVD disc includes music videos to majority of the singles from Best: Third Universe, the singles to Universe, and music videos to the original album tracks "Superstar" and "You're So Beautiful".
- First pressing double album – Consists of sixteen greatest hits tracks on a first disc, and fourteen original tracks on a second disc. Includes one bonus track and a B2 size poster.
- First pressing double album & DVD – Consists of sixteen greatest hits tracks on a first disc, and fifteen original tracks on a second disc. DVD disc includes music videos to majority of the singles from Best: Third Universe, the singles to Universe, and music videos to the original album tracks "Superstar" and "You're So Beautiful". Includes one bonus track and a B2 size poster.
- Digital download – Consists of sixteen greatest hits tracks on a first disc, and fourteen original tracks on a second disc.
- Digital Chaku Uta download – Consists of sixteen greatest hits tracks on a first disc, and fourteen original tracks on a second disc. Includes bonus code sheet to download short ringtone versions from Universe.
- Digital Chaku Uta download – Consists of sixteen greatest hits tracks on a first disc, and fourteen original tracks on a second disc. Includes bonus code sheet to download short and long ringtone versions from Universe; this is exclusive to all Shidax stores.

== Charts ==
=== Weekly charts ===
Chart (2010)	Peak position
Japanese Albums (Oricon)	1
Japanese Top Albums (Billboard)	2
Taiwan Combo Albums (G-Music)	18
Taiwan East Asia Albums (G-Music)	4

=== Monthly charts ===
Chart (2010)	Peak position
Japanese Albums (Oricon)	4

=== Year-end charts ===
Chart (2010)	Position
Japanese Albums (Oricon)	18

== Certifications ==
Region	Certification	Certified units/sales
Japan (RIAJ)	Platinum	371,590

== Release history ==
Region	Date	Format	Label
Japan	February 3, 2010	Double CD	Avex Trax; Rhythm Zone
Japan	February 3, 2010	Double CD & DVD	Avex Trax; Rhythm Zone
Japan	February 3, 2010	Best: Third Universe CD only	Avex Trax; Rhythm Zone
Japan	February 3, 2010	Digital album	Avex Music Creative Inc.
Australia	February 3, 2010	Digital album	Avex Music Creative Inc.
New Zealand	February 3, 2010	Digital album	Avex Music Creative Inc.
United Kingdom	February 3, 2010	Digital album	Avex Music Creative Inc.
Germany	February 3, 2010	Digital album	Avex Music Creative Inc.
Ireland	February 3, 2010	Digital album	Avex Music Creative Inc.
France	February 3, 2010	Digital album	Avex Music Creative Inc.
Spain	February 3, 2010	Digital album	Avex Music Creative Inc.
Taiwan	February 3, 2010	Digital album	Avex Music Creative Inc.
Hong Kong	February 10, 2010	Double CD	Avex Hong Kong; Rhythm Zone
South Korea	February 19, 2010	Double CD	Avex Trax; S.M. Entertainment; Rhythm Zone
Hong Kong	February 23, 2010	Double CD & Original Chaku Uta/Shidax	Avex Hong Kong; Rhythm Zone

== See also ==
- List of Oricon number-one albums of 2010
