= Universe (Koda Kumi album) =

- Booklet artwork that was included in the conjoined album Best: Third Universe & 8th Al. Universe

Studio album by Koda Kumi
- Released: February 3, 2010
- Recorded: 2009–2010
- Genre: J-pop; EDM; rock; pop
- Length: 61:21
- Label: Avex Music Creative Inc.; Avex Trax; Avex Taiwan; Rhythm Zone
- Producer: Adam Watts; Andy Dott; Figge; Hiro; Hiroto Suzuki; Hugo Lira; Hum; H-Wonder; Ian-Paolo Lira; Markie; STY; Taro Iwashiro; Thomas Gustafsson; Tim Larsson; Tommy Henriksen; U-Key Zone; Yuuki

Koda Kumi chronology
| Koda Kumi Driving Hit's (2009) | Universe (2010) | BEST ~third universe~ (2010) |

Singles from Universe
- 1. "It's All Love!" Released: March 31, 2009; 2. "3 Splash" Released: July 8, 2009; 3. "Alive/Physical Thing" Released: September 16, 2009; 4. "Can We Go Back" Released: January 20, 2010

Universe (sometimes stylized as 8th Al. Universe or 8th AL "UNIVERSE") (Note: Although Universe is the album's registered album title, its name has differed since its release with the greatest hits album Best: Third Universe. For its domestic releases, Universe and the greatest hits goes by the title; BEST -third universe- & 8th AL "Universe", Best ~Third Universe~ & 8th AL "Universe", and 8th AL "UNIVERSE". For international releases, Universe and the greatest hits album goes by the title; Best - Third Universe & 8th AL Universe and Best: Third Universe & 8th Universe.) is the eighth studio album by Japanese recording artist Koda Kumi. It was released as a double album with her third greatest its album Best: Third Universe on February 3, 2010, by Rhythm Zone. Beginning in early 2009 after completing two mini-concert tours, the album's production was handled by several music producers, such as Andy Dodd, Adam Watts, Figge, Tim Larsson, Tommy Henriksen, U-Key Zone, Thomas Gustafsson, and H-Wonder. It also features a guest appearance from Koda's sister and Japanese recording artist Misono. Koda contributed towards the album as the executive producer and songwriter. Universe is primarily a J-pop album with numerous elements of dance-pop, rock, R&B, electropop, and pop ballads.

As a double album, it was released in four different formats; a two album bundle, a two album and DVD bundle, a two album first pressing bundle, and a two album digital release. A fifth format was released, but only featured the compilation. Upon its release, Universe was met with generally positive reviews from music critics, many of whom complimented the singles, composition, and labelled it as Koda's strongest and most essential album to date. However, critics were divided on its production; many felt it was fresh, but criticized some of the song's repetitive nature. Commercially, Universe was a success. Charting together as a double album, Best: Third Universe and Universe became Koda's third and fourth number one compilation and studio album to reach the top spot on Japan's Oricon Albums Chart respectively. Best: Third Universe and Universe was certified platinum by the Recording Industry Association of Japan (RIAJ) for shipments of 250,000 units. It also charted in Taiwan, entering the top twenty on two competent charts.

Four singles were released from Universe. Its lead single "It's All Love!" was a commercial success, peaking at number one on the Japanese Oricon Singles Chart and Japan Hot 100 chart. It sold over 100,000 physical and 250,000 digital units in that region. Following singles "Alive" and "Physical Thing" were limited to 50,000 units, reaching the top spot on the Oricon Singles Chart. A cover song of Kelly Clarkson's "Can We Go Back" was released as the album's final single, peaking a two on the Oricon Singles Chart. 3 Splash, the album's only extended play single, reached number two on the Oricon Singles Chart. Koda promoted the album on her 2010 Universe Tour and her 10th Anniversary Tour, and followed up with remix albums; Koda Kumi Driving Hit's 2 and its third issue.

== Background and development ==
In early January 2010, Japanese recording artist Koda Kumi announced plans of releasing a double album. The double album was to promote both her third greatest hits album entitled Best: Third Universe, and a new studio album that consisted of unreleased material from recording sessions for her 2008 album, Trick. However, new material arose after completing her concert tours: The 2009 Trick Tour and her first Taiwanese concert tour. Universe is Koda's first double album since her 2005 greatest hits album Best: First Things, which included single between her December 2000 debut "Take Back" and her May 2004 single "Cutie Honey", with a bonus disc with newly recorded material. Universe is also Koda's first double album to consist of a full-length studio album and other material.

For Universe, Koda's record label Rhythm Zone and its parent company Avex Trax hired several producers, such as Andy Dodd, Adam Watts, Figge, Tim Larsson, Tommy Henriksen, U-Key Zone, Thomas Gustafsson, and H-Wonder. Producers such as Henriksen, Gustafsson, and H-Wonder have collaborated with Koda in the past with her album Kingdom (2008). Universe was produced by Japanese and Western producers; Koda furthered this feat on her following studio albums Japonesque (2012), Bon Voyage (2014), and Walk of My Life (2015).

== Composition ==
Universe is a J-pop album with numerous elements of dance-pop, rock, R&B, electropop, and pop ballad. Koda sings in both English and Japanese language, while tracks "Step Into My World" and "Universe" are sung primarily in English language. (Note: According to the album notes and accompanying lyric sheet, there are two English ("Step Into My World", and "Universe"), and thirteen Japanese tracks ("Can We Go Back", "Superstar", "You're So Beautiful", "Lick Me", "Work It Out!", "No Way", "Stay", "Comes Up", "Physical Thing", "Ecstasy", "It's All Love", and "Alive").) (Note: Despite the two English tracks being identified as English songs, each of those songs include minor words in Japanese. This is similar to the other thirteen Japanese tracks, which includes minor English language. However, because the tracks overemphasize their respective languages in the lyric sheet provided by Rhythm Zone, Avex Trax, S.M. Entertainment, and Avex Taiwan, they are identified as their respective language tracks.) Each song, apart from "Step Into My World", "Ecstasy" and "Universe", is co-written by Koda, including the English and Japanese tracks. This is Koda's first album since Feel My Mind (2004) not to include any interlude or introduction tracks. Majority of the tracks emphasize electronic dance music, including "Step Into My World", "Lick Me", "Work it Out!", "Comes Up", "Physical Thing", "Ecstasy", and "Universe". Rock music elements are featured in tracks "Can We Go Back" and "It's All Love!"; the former track is a cover song that was originally performed by American singer Kelly Clarkson, while the latter is a collaboration with Koda's younger sister and Japanese recording artist Misono. Three ballad songs appeared on the album; "No Way", "Stay", and "Alive". All the track titles from Universe are written in English language with no use of Kanji, hiragana, or katakana writing from the Japanese writing system; this is her first album to do since her debut album Affection (2002).

== Release and packaging ==
Universe was released as a double album with her third greatest its album Best: Third Universe on February 3, 2010, by Rhythm Zone in four different formats. The double CD featured the sixteen greatest hits tracks and fourteen original tracks on two separate compact discs. The second first press issues featured a bonus track, the live version to "Moon Crying", and a bonus poster. The double CD and DVD bundle featured the sixteen greatest hits tracks and fourteen original tracks on two separate compact discs, and a bonus DVD, including the music videos for the lead singles from the greatest hits and all featured singles from Universe. This format also included the live version of "Moon Crying" and a bonus poster. The final format is the digital release, which was released worldwide. This format featured the sixteen greatest hits tracks and fourteen original tracks. A fifth format was released to promote both the greatest hits album and Universe, but only included the greatest hits CD. However, a bonus booklet featured a website code to download short ringtones of all Universe tracks.

The six Universe cover sleeves feature different images all photographed by Leslie Kee. The double album format has Koda looking towards the camera, holding up the booklet to her second greatest hits compilation Best: Second Session (2006). The double album and bonus DVD format has Koda drinking from a coffee mug, while sitting on a kitchen bench reading the booklet. Despite not being included on the compilation only format, the text "8th Al. Universe" is featured on the front cover, and has Koda holding up a strawberry. The digital release uses the double album as its front cover. Apart from the digital and compilation only release, each physical format features two booklets. The booklet front for Universe has a close-up of Koda with dark eye shadow, feathered jewellery and long false nails. A greatest hits booklet was also issued, featuring a close-up of Koda with long brown hair and minimal make-up. The booklets and photo shoots were designed by members of United Lounge Tokyo, and the theme is immolating Koda's Best: Second Session photo shoot.

== Promotion ==
=== Live performances and advertisements ===
Before the release of Best: Third Universe and Universe, Koda premiered and performed "Ecstasy", "It's All Love!", "Hashire", and "Lick Me" on her 2009 Trick Tour in Japan. Koda then performed the same tracks on her 2009 Taiwan concert tour. In early January 2010, Koda announced a special fan club performance to premiere and perform tracks from both Best: Third Universe and Universe. Dubbed as a "10th Anniversary Tour Passport", the tickets were given to "reserved" fan club guests that had been subscribed to Koda's official fan club website. The performances, both on January 13 and January 21, were scheduled at an undisclosed arena. In early 2009, Koda announced her involvement with the Japanese arena concert tour A-Nation 2009; Koda performed "Lick Me" and "Ecstasy". In 2011, the Universe tracks: "Lick Me", "Superstar", "Ecstasy", "Universe", "No Way", "Can We Go Back", "Work It Out!", and "Hashire!" were included on the limited Dream Music Park festival in Japan; the live performances were featured on the DVD format for Koda's album Dejavu (2011).

In early February 2010, Koda announced that she would speak in an exclusive interview to discuss the background and development of the Universe album, its featured songs, a reflection of her career, and an upcoming tour. The interview premiered on Music On! television in Japan on February 18, 2010. In a collaboration with Japanese car company Maplus, Koda confirmed that Best: Third Universe and Universe would be on a special limited price promo alongside the promotion of her new car navigation system, entitled "Koda Kumi Driving Navi". Several songs from Universe were promoted in various Japanese companies and business; "Can We Go Back" was used as the Japanese premiere track for Darren Shan's film adapted book, Cirque du Freak: The Vampire's Assistant. "It's All Love!" was used as the commercial song for Music.Jp, the ending theme song for the Nippon TV series "Clean", and an Avex Trax commercial. "Ecstasy" was used for Music.Jp, "Lick Me" was used for the televised commercial of her Koda Kumi Fever Live in Hall II concert, and "Hashire" was used for the NTT communications advert Musico.

=== Singles ===
"It's All Love!" was released as the album's lead single on March 31, 2009. The song is Koda and Misono's first collaboration. Upon its release, "It's All Love!" garnered positive reviews from music critics. Many critics commended the song's "aggressive" composition and vocal deliveries from both Kumi and Misono. "It's All Love!" was successful in Japan, peaking at number one on the Japanese Oricon Singles Chart, Koda's sixth number one and Misono's first number one single. It also reached the top spot on Billboard's Japan Hot 100 chart, and was certified gold by the Recording Industry Association of Japan (RIAJ) for physical shipments of 100,000 units, and platinum for ringtone sales of 250,000 units. The accompanying music video for "It's All Love" was shot in Tokyo by Takashi Tadokoro; it features Koda and Misono in a futuristic room performing the song.

3 Splash was released as the album's second single and first extended play single on July 8, 2009. The EP consists of three interlude tracks, two album tracks: "Lick Me" and "Ecstasy", and an unreleased track "Hashire". Upon its release, 3 Splash received favourable reviews from music critics who commended the EP's production and commercial appeal. 3 Splash was successful in Japan, peaking at number one on the Japanese Oricon Singles Chart, and sold over 98,000 units in that region. The EP was certified gold by the RIAJ for shipments of 100,000 units. All three songs received an accompanying music video to promote the EP. "Lick Me" was certified platinum by the RIAJ for 250,000 digital shipments, and was nominated for a Japan Record Award at the 51st Japan Record Awards.

"Alive" and "Physical Thing" was released as the album's third single and first double a-side single on September 16, 2009. "Alive" was used as the theme song to the Japanese film "Kamui Gaiden". Upon its release, both tracks garnered positive reviews from music critics. Many critics commended the tracks productions and Koda's vocal performance. Charting together, "Alive" and "Physical Thing" debuted at number one on the Japanese Oricon Singles Chart, and sold over 43,000 units. Both tracks charted at four and 90 on Billboard's Japan Hot 100 chart. Both tracks received an accompanying music video to promote the single.

"Can We Go Back" was released as the album's fourth and final single on January 20, 2010. It was the first release of Koda's to celebrate 10 years since her musical debut. Upon its release, "Can We Go Back" received garnered positive reviews from music critics. Many critics commended the tracks rock composition. Despite selling only 37,000 limited units, it charted at number two on the Japanese Oricon Singles Chart. It charted at number 6 on Japan's Hot 100 chart. An accompanying music video for "Can We Go Back" was shot by Ryuji Seki; it features Koda in chains and singing in a grungy atmosphere.

=== Other charted songs ===
"Superstar" and "You're So Beautiful" served as the album's promotional singles. "Superstar" charted at number 89 on Billboard's Japan Hot 100 chart. Accompanying music videos for both "Superstar" and "You're So Beautiful" were directed by Hiroaki Higashi and Takashi Tadokoro. Despite not being included on Universe or the greatest hits album, the 3 Splash track "Hashire!" was released as a promotional single.

=== Concert tours and other releases ===
To promote Universe and Best: Third Universe', Koda went on her 2010 Universe tour. The concert tour went throughout Japan, and the recurring theme was outer space and the shuttle used for the voyage (on all concert merchandise) was labelled Koda Airlines. All of the album tracks, apart from "It's All Love" and "Alive", were included on the set list for the tour; "Hashire!" from 3 Splash also appeared on the set list. The concert tour was released in two formats; a double-DVD bundle, and a Blu-ray release. The DVD reached number one on the Oricon DVD Chart, with over 67,078 units sold by 2010 and was ranked 27 on the Annual Oricon Yearly DVD Chart. Koda further promoted the album on her 10th Anniversary Tour. Despite this, only "Lick Me", "Universe", and "It's All Love!" were included on the set list for the tour. The concert tour was released in two formats; a double-DVD bundle, and a Blu-ray release. The DVD reached number one on the Oricon DVD Chart, with over 40,141 units sold by 2010 and was ranked 36 on the Annual Oricon Yearly DVD Chart.

To promote the material from Universe, several tracks were remixed and produced for Koda's third remix album Koda Kumi Driving Hit's 2 (2010). The remix album featured the tracks: "Lick Me", "Ecstasy", and "Universe". Koda's third Driving remix album included more tracks from Universe, including: "Can We Go Back", "Physical Thing", and "Good Thing". "Good Thing" was a b-side track from "Can We Go Back".

== Critical reception ==
Professional ratings
Review scores
| Source | Rating |
|---|---|
| AllMusic (first review) | 3.5/5 stars |
| AllMusic (second review) | 3.5/5 stars |
| Hot Express | (positive) |

Universe received favourable reviews from most music critics. Adam Greenberg from AllMusic awarded the album three-and-a-half stars out of five. He commented "Here [on Universe], she largely works over live instrumentation (eschewing for the most part the electronic sampling that takes up so much of Japanese pop), stepping away from the folds a bit." Despite the "repetitive" nature and mixture of genres, Greenberg concluded "Universe provides a lot of things in its relatively long course, from rock to ballads to electro-funk dance tracks. It's that element of surprise and interest that Koda produces so well that makes the album compelling, the elements of acoustic pop, of electronica that isn't overproduced. Definitely worth a few spins."

Ian Martin from the same publication awarded it three-and-a-half stars, opening by saying "Kumi Koda is a performer who divides opinion in her homeland, mocked and hated openly by many in Japan, and with many of her fans reluctant to admit to liking her." Martin later commented "Delving beneath Koda's image also reveals a generally high standard of music, albeit one that, for all the genre-hopping on display, never really strays too far from the blueprint of archetypal Avex Trax pop." Tetsuo Hiraga from Hot Express was positive towards the double album. Hiraga labelled Universe Koda's most "essential" studio album, and called it some of her best work to date.

== Commercial performance ==
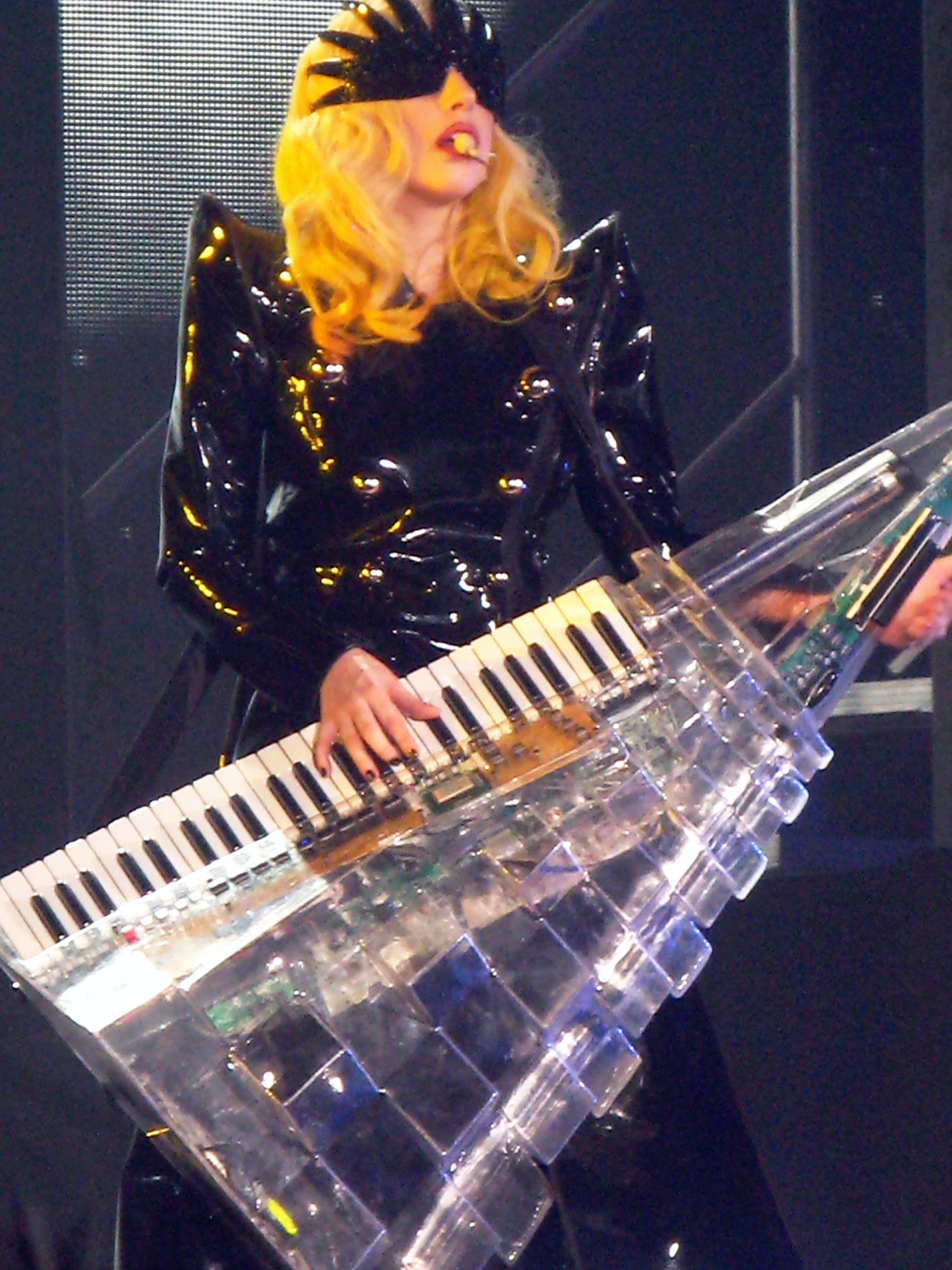
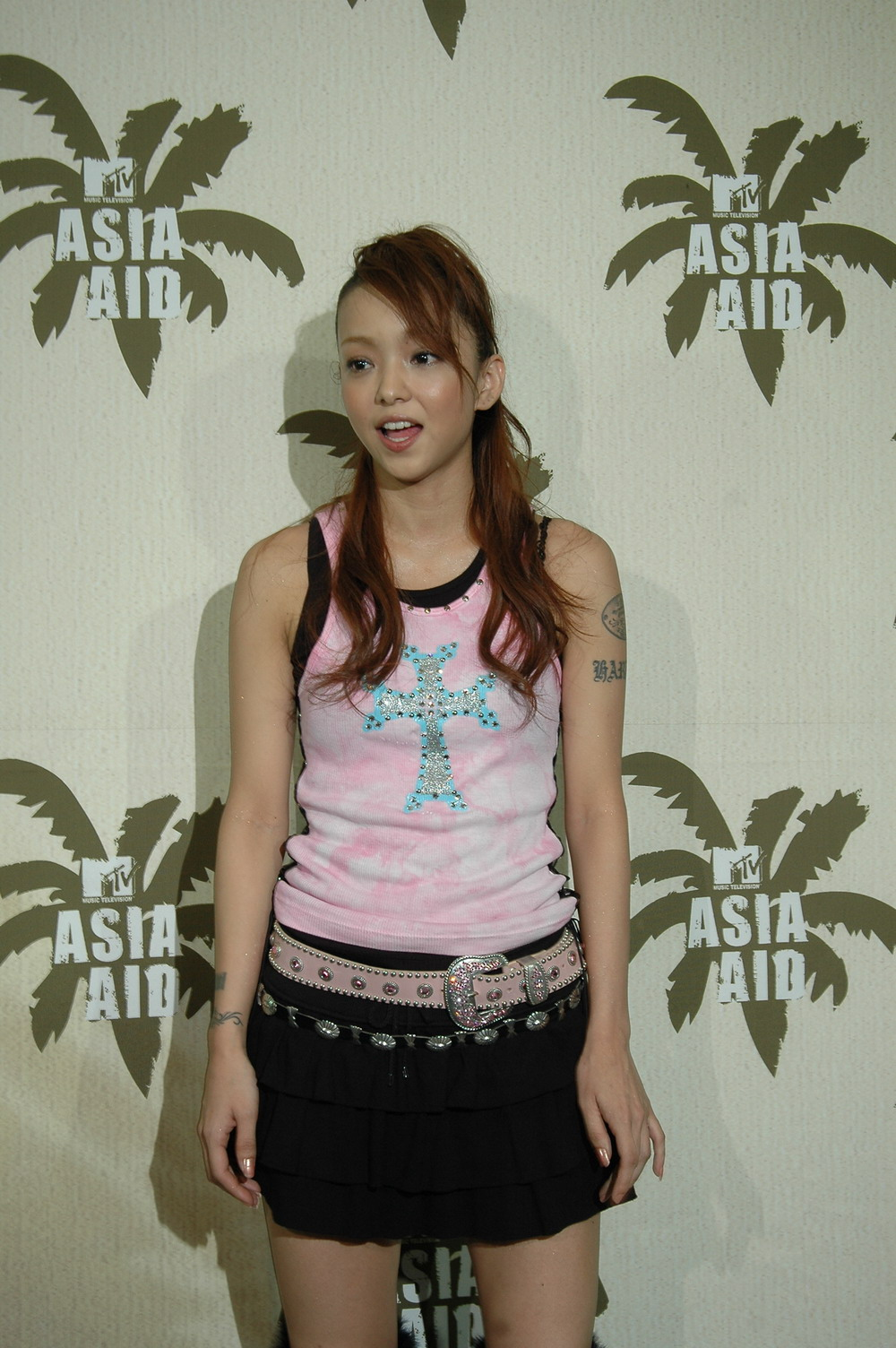
Despite selling over 372,000 units, Universe was the fifth best selling album by a female artist. Lady Gaga's The Fame Monster (left) and Namie Amuro's Past Future (right) had beaten Koda's sales.

Charting together as a double album, Best: Third Universe and Universe debuted at number one on the Japanese Oricon Daily Albums Chart with 76,056 units sold, but slipped two number two for the rest of the week days. Despite this, Best: Third Universe and Universe debuted at number one on the Japanese Oricon Daily Weekly Chart with an estimated 221,887 first week sales. Both albums became Koda's third and fourth number one compilation and studio album to reach the top spot on the Oricon Albums Chart respectively. Despite this, Best: Third Universe and Universe became Koda's lowest selling greatest hits and studio album since Best: Second Session and Trick in first week sales; the former sold over 950,000, and the later sold over 250,000 units in its first week. It fell to three in its second week, shifting over 60,552 units. The album stayed inside the top ten for four weeks, selling over 325,000 units in its course. It spent fifteen weeks inside the top 100 chart, and 32 weeks in the top 300 chart. By the end of 2010, Best: Third Universe and Universe sold over 371,590 units and was ranked 18 on the Annual Oricon Yearly Albums Chart; this made Koda the fifth female artist on the chart, behind Lady Gaga, Kaela Kimura, Namie Amuro, and Kana Nishino. To date, Oricon's database has ranked Best: Third Universe and Universe as Koda's seventh best-selling album.

Best: Third Universe and Universe entered at number two on Japan's Billboard Top Albums Sales. Unable to reach the top spot, it slipped to number three the following week, and eventually stayed in the top 100 chart for 16 weeks; its final position was at 89. Best: Third Universe and Universe was certified platinum by the Recording Industry Association of Japan (RIAJ) for shipments of 250,000 units. To date, the album has sold over 372,002 units in Japan. Best: Third Universe and Universe also reached number 18 on the Taiwanese Albums Chart, and 4 their East Asian Albums Chart. (Note: The G-Music chart was established in July 2005 and only archives the top 20 releases.) (Note: Week references for G-Music: Bon Voyage 2010 week 6.) (Note: The G-Music chart was established in July 2005 and only archives the top 20 releases.) (Note: Week references for G-Music: Bon Voyage 2010 week 6.)

== Track listing ==
Universe album.
| No. | Title | Lyrics | Music | Length |
|---|---|---|---|---|
| 1. | "Step into My World" | Sty | Sty | 2:59 |
| 2. | "Can We Go Back" | Koda Kumi; Adam Watts; Andy Dodd; Shanna Crooks | Watts; Dodds | 3:23 |
| 3. | "Superstar" | Koda; Figge; Johan Lindman | Figge | 3:19 |
| 4. | "You're So Beautiful" | Koda; Johan Fransson; Tim Larsson; Tobias Lundgren | Larsson | 3:40 |
| 5. | "Lick Me" | Koda | Yoo | 3:28 |
| 6. | "Work It Out!" | Koda; Dana Calitri; Nina Ossoff; Tommy Henriksen | Henriksen | 3:46 |
| 7. | "No Way" | Koda | U-Key Zone | 5:39 |
| 8. | "Stay" | Koda | Markie | 4:10 |
| 9. | "Comes Up" | Koda; Yuuki | Yuuki | 3:53 |
| 10. | "Physical Thing" | Koda; Hugo Lira; Ian-Paolo Lira; Negin; Nosheen; Thomas Gustafsson | Lira; Gustafsson; Lira | 2:55 |
| 11. | "Ecstasy" | Hum | Hum | 3:26 |
| 12. | "Universe" | Hiro | Hiro | 3:33 |
| 13. | "It's All Love!" (Koda Kumi x Misono) | Koda; Misono Koda | Kenichi Maeyamada | 4:55 |
| 14. | "Alive" | Koda | G.F. Handel; Taro Iwashiro | 3:41 |
| 15. | "Moon Crying" (Live Version in Taiwan, First Press Track Only) | Koda | Miwa Furuse | 7:47 |

=== Best: Third Universe & 8th Al. Universe ===
The Best: Third Universe and Universe collection premiered on February 3, 2010, as a double album. The listing below contains two formats; the original double album, and a bonus DVD format. The track list below details the personnel, credits, and performances from both Best: Third Universe and Universe, and not a stand-alone for Universe.

Best: Third Universe album (CD 1).
| No. | Title | Length |
|---|---|---|
| 1. | "Koi no Tsubomi" (from Black Cherry) | 4:06 |
| 2. | "I'll Be There" (from Black Cherry) | 4:15 |
| 3. | "Ningyo Hime" (from Black Cherry) | 4:25 |
| 4. | "With Your Smile" (from Black Cherry) | 4:15 |
| 5. | "Yume no Uta" (from Black Cherry) | 4:43 |
| 6. | "But" (from Kingdom) | 3:37 |
| 7. | "Freaky" (from Kingdom) | 3:18 |
| 8. | "Girls" (from Freaky) | 4:37 |
| 9. | "Ai no Uta" (from Kingdom) | 4:51 |
| 10. | "Last Angel" (feat. Tohoshinki; from Kingdom) | 3:48 |
| 11. | "Anytime" (from Kingdom) | 4:09 |
| 12. | "Moon Crying" (from Trick) | 5:43 |
| 13. | "That Ain't Cool" (feat. Fergie; from Trick) | 3:30 |
| 14. | "Lady Go!" (from Koda Kumi Driving Hit's) | 4:02 |
| 15. | "Taboo" (from Trick) | 3:50 |
| 16. | "Stay with Me" (from Trick) | 4:53 |

8th Al. Universe album (CD 2)
| No. | Title | Lyrics | Music | Length |
|---|---|---|---|---|
| 1. | "Step into My World" | Sty | Sty | 2:59 |
| 2. | "Can We Go Back" | Koda Kumi, Adam Watts, Andy Dodd, Shanna Crooks | Andy Dodd, Adam Watts | 3:23 |
| 3. | "Superstar" | Koda, Figge, Johan Lindman | Figge | 3:19 |
| 4. | "You're So Beautiful" | Koda, Johan Fransson, Tim Larsson, Tobias Lundgren | Tim Larsson | 3:40 |
| 5. | "Lick Me" | Koda | Yoo | 3:28 |
| 6. | "Work It Out!" | Koda, Dana Calitri, Nina Ossoff, Tommy Henriksen | Tommy Henriksen | 3:46 |
| 7. | "No Way" | Koda | U-Key Zone | 5:39 |
| 8. | "Stay" | Koda | Markie | 4:10 |
| 9. | "Comes Up" | Koda, Yuuki | Yuuki | 3:53 |
| 10. | "Physical Thing" | Koda, Hugo Lira, Ian-Paolo Lira, Negin, Nosheen, Thomas Gustafsson | Hugo Lira, Thomas Gustafsson, Ian-Paolo Lira | 2:55 |
| 11. | "Ecstasy" | Hum | Hum | 3:26 |
| 12. | "Universe" | Hiro | Hiro | 3:33 |
| 13. | "It's All Love!" (Koda Kumi x Misono) | Koda, Misono | Kenichi Maeyamada | 4:55 |
| 14. | "Alive" | Koda | G.F. Handel, Taro Iwashiro | 3:41 |
| 15. | "Moon Crying" (Live Version in Taiwan, First Press Track Only) | Koda | Miwa Furuse | 7:47 |

DVD
| No. | Title | Length |
|---|---|---|
| 1. | "Koi no Tsubomi" | 4:07 |
| 2. | "Ningyo Hime" | 4:40 |
| 3. | "Yume no Uta" | 5:06 |
| 4. | "But" | 3:53 |
| 5. | "Freaky" | 3:42 |
| 6. | "Ai no Uta" | 4:40 |
| 7. | "Last Angel" (feat. Tohoshinki) | 4:11 |
| 8. | "anytime" | 4:14 |
| 9. | "Moon Crying" | 6:31 |
| 10. | "Taboo" | 4:09 |
| 11. | "Stay with Me" | 5:09 |
| 12. | "It's All Love!" (Koda Kumi x Misono) | 5:02 |
| 13. | "Lick Me" | 3:39 |
| 14. | "Ecstasy" | 3:35 |
| 15. | "Physical Thing" | 3:09 |
| 16. | "Can We Go Back" | 4:37 |
| 17. | "Superstar" | 3:25 |
| 18. | "You're So Beautiful" | 3:49 |

=== Formats ===
- Double album – Consists of sixteen greatest hits tracks on a first disc, and fourteen original tracks on a second disc.
- Double album & DVD – Consists of sixteen greatest hits tracks on a first disc, and fifteen original tracks on a second disc. DVD disc includes music videos to majority of the singles from Best: Third Universe, the singles to Universe, and music videos to the original album tracks "Superstar" and "You're So Beautiful".
- First pressing double album – Consists of sixteen greatest hits tracks on a first disc, and fourteen original tracks on a second disc. Includes one bonus track and a B2 size poster.
- First pressing double album & DVD – Consists of sixteen greatest hits tracks on a first disc, and fifteen original tracks on a second disc. DVD disc includes music videos to majority of the singles from Best: Third Universe, the singles to Universe, and music videos to the original album tracks "Superstar" and "You're So Beautiful". Includes one bonus track and a B2 size poster.
- Digital download – Consists of sixteen greatest hits tracks on a first disc, and fourteen original tracks on a second disc.
- Digital Chaku Uta download – Consists of sixteen greatest hits tracks on a first disc, and fourteen original tracks on a second disc. Includes bonus code sheet to download short ringtone versions from Universe.
- Digital Chaku Uta download – Consists of sixteen greatest hits tracks on a first disc, and fourteen original tracks on a second disc. Includes bonus code sheet to download short and long ringtone versions from Universe; this is exclusive to all Shidax stores.

== Personnel ==
Credits adapted from the liner notes of Universe.

- Koda Kumi – vocals, background vocals, songwriting, executive producer
- STY – producer
- Adam Watts – producer
- Andy Dodd – producer
- Shanna Crooks – songwriting
- Figge – producer
- Tim Larsson – producer
- Tommy Henriksen – producer
- U-Key Zone –producer
- Markie – producer
- Yuuki – producer
- Hugo Lira – producer
- Ian-Paolo Lira – producer
- Negin, Nosheen – producer
- Thomas Gustafsson – producer
- Hum – producer
- Hiro – producer
- Misono Koda - featuring vocals, background vocals
- Taro Iwashiro – producer
- Rhythm Zone - management, label
- Avex Taiwan – distribution label
- S.M. Entertainment – distribution label
- Avex Trax - parent label, management

== Charts ==
=== Weekly charts ===
| Chart (2010) | Peak position |
|---|---|
| Japanese Albums (Oricon) | 1 |
| Japanese Top Albums (Billboard) | 2 |
| Taiwan Combo Albums (G-Music) | 18 |
| Taiwan East Asia Albums (G-Music) | 4 |

=== Monthly charts ===
| Chart (2010) | Peak position |
|---|---|
| Japanese Albums (Oricon) | 4 |

=== Year-end charts ===
| Chart (2010) | Position |
|---|---|
| Japanese Albums (Oricon) | 18 |

== Certifications ==
| Region | Certification | Certified units/sales |
|---|---|---|
| Japan (RIAJ) | Platinum | 372,000 |

== Release history ==
| Region | Date | Format | Label |
|---|---|---|---|
| Japan | February 3, 2010 | Double CD | Avex Trax; Rhythm Zone |
| Japan | February 3, 2010 | Double CD & DVD | Avex Trax; Rhythm Zone |
| Japan | February 3, 2010 | Best: Third Universe CD only | Avex Trax; Rhythm Zone |
| Japan | February 3, 2010 | Digital album | Avex Music Creative Inc. |
| Australia | February 3, 2010 | Digital album | Avex Music Creative Inc. |
| New Zealand | February 3, 2010 | Digital album | Avex Music Creative Inc. |
| United Kingdom | February 3, 2010 | Digital album | Avex Music Creative Inc. |
| Germany | February 3, 2010 | Digital album | Avex Music Creative Inc. |
| Ireland | February 3, 2010 | Digital album | Avex Music Creative Inc. |
| France | February 3, 2010 | Digital album | Avex Music Creative Inc. |
| Spain | February 3, 2010 | Digital album | Avex Music Creative Inc. |
| Taiwan | February 3, 2010 | Digital album | Avex Music Creative Inc. |
| Hong Kong | February 10, 2010 | Double CD | Avex Hong Kong; Rhythm Zone |
| South Korea | February 19, 2010 | Double CD | Avex Trax; S.M. Entertainment; Rhythm Zone |
| Hong Kong | February 23, 2010 | Double CD & Original Chaku Uta/Shidax | Avex Hong Kong; Rhythm Zone |

== Alternate versions ==
UNIVERSE

1. UNIVERSE: Found on the album (2010)
2. UNIVERSE [Pink Chameleons Remix]: Found on Koda Kumi Driving Hit's 2 (2010)

You're So Beautiful

1. You're So Beautiful: Found on the album (2010)
2. You're So Beautiful [D.O.C Remix]: Found on Koda Kumi Driving Hit's 8 (2018)

== See also ==
- List of Oricon number-one albums of 2010
