= Live Tour 2010: Universe =

Video by Koda Kumi
- Released: October 6, 2010 (DVD); May 18, 2011 (Blu-ray); March 20, 2013 (rental live CD)
- Genre: J-pop
- Label: Rhythm Zone

Koda Kumi chronology
2009 Taiwan Live (2010)	Live Tour 2010: Universe (2010)	Eternity: Love & Songs at Billboard Live (2011)

Live Tour 2010: Universe (stylized as LIVE TOUR 2010 ~UNIVERSE~) is the 10th LIVE DVD from Koda Kumi and is the live tour that corresponds with her album Best: Third Universe. The concert's theme was outer space and the shuttle used for the voyage (on all concert merchandise) was Koda Airline

The DVD has two discs: the first containing the concert footage and the second with bonus features and the making-of. Both discs include audio commentary. The DVD charted #1 on the Oricon Chart and has sold over 67,078.

== Track list ==
(Official Track list)

=== DVD1 ===
0. "Opening Movie"

1. "Step Into My World"
2. "Universe"
3. "BUT"
  <Interlude Movie 1>
4. "Lick me♥"
5. "Superstar"
6. "Koi no Tsubomi" (Airline Ver.)
7. "Stay"
  <Interlude Movie 2>
8. "Got to Be Real"
9. "Cutie Honey"
10. "Dance Part"
11. "Ecstasy"
12. "Physical Thing"
13. "No Way"
  <Interlude Movie 3>
14. "Ai no Uta"
15. "futari de..."
16. "You're So Beautiful"
  <Interlude Movie 4>
17. "Can We Go Back"
18. "Freaky"
19. "Work It Out!"
20. "Hashire!"
21. "With your smile"
  Encore
22. "Single Medley: Lady Go! / stay with me / Butterfly / Last Angel / Taboo / girls / Good☆day
23. "Comes Up"
24. "walk"

=== DVD2 ===
1. "Universe Space Channel"

== Show dates ==
Live Tour 2010 ～Universe～
- Tour by Koda Kumi
- Location: Japan
- Associated album: Best: Third Universe
- Start date: April 10, 2010
- End date: July 4, 2010
- No. of shows: 20

Koda Kumi concert chronology
- Live Tour 2009: Trick (2009); Live Tour 2010: Universe (2010); Live Tour 2011: Dejavu (2011)

Koda Kumi Live Tour 2010 ～Universe～
Date	City	Venue	Attendance
April 10, 2010	Osaka	Osaka-jō Hall	200,000
April 11, 2010	Osaka	Osaka-jō Hall	200,000
April 17, 2010	Nagano	Nagano Olympic Memorial Arena	200,000
April 24, 2010	Fukuoka	Marine Messe Fukuoka	200,000
April 25, 2010	Fukuoka	Marine Messe Fukuoka	200,000
May 1, 2010	Nagoya	Nippon Gaishi Hall	200,000
May 2, 2010	Nagoya	Nippon Gaishi Hall	200,000
May 8, 2010	Hokkaido	Hokkaido Prefectural Sports Center	200,000
May 9, 2010	Hokkaido	Hokkaido Prefectural Sports Center	200,000
May 15, 2010	Saitama	Saitama Super Arena	200,000
May 16, 2010	Saitama	Saitama Super Arena	200,000
May 22, 2010	Kobe	World Memorial Hall	200,000
May 23, 2010	Kobe	World Memorial Hall	200,000
May 30, 2010	Aomori	Aomori Arena	200,000
June 5, 2010	Shizuoka	Ecopa Arena	200,000
June 6, 2010	Shizuoka	Ecopa Arena	200,000
June 10, 2010	Osaka	Osaka-jō Hall	200,000
June 11, 2010	Osaka	Osaka-jō Hall	200,000
July 3, 2010	Yokohama	Yokohama Stadium	200,000
July 4, 2010	Yokohama	Yokohama Stadium	200,000
