= Dejavu (Koda Kumi album) =

Studio album by Koda Kumi
- Released: March 2, 2011
- Recorded: 2010–2011
- Genre: J-pop; electropop; dance-pop; R&B; pop rock
- Label: Rhythm Zone
- Producer: Koda Kumi

Koda Kumi chronology
Eternity: Love & Songs (2010)	Dejavu (2011)	Driving Hit's 3 (2011)

Singles from Dejavu
- 1. "Gossip Candy" Released: July 7, 2010; 2. "Suki de, Suki de, Suki de./Anata Dake ga" Released: September 22, 2010; 3. "Pop Diva" Released: February 2, 2011

Dejavu is the ninth studio album by Japanese singer-songwriter Koda Kumi. It was released on March 2, 2011, one month after her single "Pop Diva". Just like her previous albums, beginning with Best ~first things~ (2005), Dejavu topped the Oricon charts at No. 1 and remained on the charts for twenty-four weeks.

The album was released as a CD and a CD+2DVD combo, the latter of which was only released for a limited time and held the concert Dream Music Park. Once the limited editions sold out, a CD+DVD edition was made public, which omitted the live performance.

== Background and release ==
Dejavu is Japanese pop-R&B singer Koda Kumi's ninth studio album. It was released a month after her limited released single "Pop Diva". The album peaked at No. 1 on the Oricon Albums Charts and remained on the charts for twenty-four weeks.

Dejavu was released in two editions – a standard CD and first press limited edition CD+2DVD edition, which featured Kumi's performance Dream Music Park. After the CD+2DVD sold out, a CD+DVD version was released, which omitted the performance. The first DVD contained four new music videos and an alternate video of "Pop Diva". "Be My Baby" and "Megumi no Hito" were both given music videos, despite their songs not being placed on the CD. Initially, they were released on Kumi's first cover album Eternity ~Love & Songs~, which had been released in October the previous year.

The album featured American singer-songwriter and producer Brandon Howard (known as B. Howard), who was featured in the song "Passing By," though he was not credited on the track listing on the back of the album covers.

On the first DVD of the CD+2DVD editions, after the music videos, the first half of Kumi's Dream Music Park at the Yokohama Stadium played with the second DVD housing the second half. Once the CD+2DVD editions sold out and the CD+DVD editions became available, only the music videos were available on the DVD. The album was certified platinum by the RIAJ after its release.

== Packaging ==
Dejavu was released in three editions. The CD-only edition contains fifteen musical tracks. The CD+DVD version contains fifteen musical tracks and nine music videos. The CD+2DVD version contains fifteen musical tracks, nine music videos and Kumi's Dream Music Park concert.

The CD+2DVD was of limited release, with only a certain number of copies produced. Once all of the 2DVD copies were sold, a CD+DVD version was available. The CD+2DVD editions contained Kumi's Dream Music Park, which spanned for two days at the Yokohama Stadium.

== Endorsements ==
"Okay" and "Aitakute" (逢いたくて / Want to See You) were both used to advertise Kracie's "Ichikami" (いち髪) shampoo range, which featured Kumi as the spokesperson for the surrounding marketing campaign. "Melting" was used as the theme song to Sogo & Seibu's "Winter City" promotional campaign. "Winter City" is an annual winter promotion done by Sogo & Seibu for the final week in December to help sell their stock of winter merchandise. "Hey baby!" was used as the opening song for popular anime Crayon Shin-chan for its twelfth season. The anime was produced by Shin-Ei Animation, and was an adaptation of the manga created by Yoshito Usui. "Bambi" was used to advertise the online store 7net Shopping. Kumi had helped advertise the site in the past with her song "Lollipop."

== Track listing ==
Dejavu – Standard edition
No.	Title	Lyrics	Music	arrangement	Length
1.	"Prologue to Dejavu"	Koda Kumi	lil' showy	lil' showy	1:13
2.	"Pop Diva"	lil' showy	lil' showy	lil' showy	3:32
3.	"Lollipop"	Koda Kumi	Ian Curnow • Jane Vaughan • Julie Morrison	Ian Curnow	3:23
4.	"Okay"	Koda Kumi • HIRO	HIRO	HIRO	4:04
5.	"Aitakute (逢いたくて / Want to see you)"	Koda Kumi	Noritaka Izumi	Noritaka Izumi • Udai Shika (Strings Arrangement)	4:32
6.	"Passing By feat. B. Howard"	Koda Kumi • B. Howard	B. Howard • Ice Mike • J. Forster • T. Wilds • Noriko Oiling	B. Howard	4:46
7.	"At The Weekend"	Koda Kumi • Nathan Duvall • Hiten Bharadia • Allan Eshuijs	Nathan Duvall • Hiten Bharadia • Allan Eshuijs	Nathan Duvall	3:11
8.	"Interlude to Dejavu"	Koda Kumi • lil' showy	lil' showy	lil' showy	0:58
9.	"Melting"	Koda Kumi	Daisuke Mori	Yūsuke Tanaka • Takashi Kondo	4:23
10.	"Hey baby!"	Koda Kumi	Shinjirō Inoue	Nao Tanaka	2:35
11.	"Choi Tashi Life (ちょい足しLIFE / Fulfilled Life)"	Koda Kumi	Hideya Nakazaki	Yoshimasa Kawabata	3:45
12.	"Anata Dake ga"	Koda Kumi	Markie • SiZK • Daisuke Sakurai	SiZK	5:12
13.	"Suki de, Suki de, Suki de."	Koda Kumi	Katsuhiko Sugiyama	Shinjirō Inoue • Chika Ishigaki	5:01
14.	"Bambi"	Koda Kumi • Miriam Nervo • Olivia Nervo • Anders Bagge • Andreas Carlsson	Miriam Nervo • Olivia Nervo • Anders Bagge • Andreas Carlsson	John Glössner • Anders Bagge	3:04
15.	"I Don't Love You !??"	Koda Kumi	FAST LANE • Shinji Moroi	Shinji Moroi	3:32

DVD 1 – Music videos & Dream Music Park (Part 1)
No.	Title	Length
1.	"Pop Diva [Album Version]" (Music Video)	3:50
2.	"Lollipop" (Music Video)	3:56
3.	"Megumi no Hito" (Music Video)	3:50
4.	"Be My Baby" (Music Video)	3:19
5.	"Bambi" (Music Video)	3:22
6.	"Passing By feat. B. Howard" (Music Video)	4:43
7.	"Suki de, Suki de, Suki de." (Music Video)	5:38
8.	"Anata Dake ga" (Music Video)	5:43
9.	"walk ~to the future~" (Music Video)	5:48
10.	"Dream Music Park (Part 1) (Note: Dream Music Park concert (Part 1): 1. Outside Fishbowl; 2. Lady Go!!; 3. Butterfly; 4. Driving; 5. real Emotion; 6. Hot Stuff feat. Mr. Blistah; 7. Lollipop; 8. Dance Part; 9. Run For Your Life; 10. BUT; 11. With your smile; 12. Lick me♥; 13. Superstar; 14. Koi no Tsubomi; 15. Stay)"

DVD 2 – Dream Music Park (Part 2)
No.	Title	Length
1.	"Taisetsu na Kimi e"
2.	"Ai no Kotoba"
3.	"Someday"
4.	"You're So Beautiful"
5.	"I'll be there"
6.	"Once Again"
7.	"Dance Part"
8.	"Moon Crying"
9.	"Ai no Uta"
10.	"Got To Be Real"
11.	"Dance Part"
12.	"Ecstasy" (Remix)
13.	"Universe"
14.	"No Way"
15.	"you"
16.	"Can We Go Back"
17.	"Freaky"
18.	"Work It Out!"
19.	"Hashire!"
20.	"girls"
21.	"Single Medley ~Shake It Up/Cherry Girl/D.D.D./It's All Love!/Wind (Remix)/Come With Me~"
22.	"Cutie Honey"
23.	"Comes Up"
24.	"walk"

== Charts ==
=== Weekly charts ===
Chart (2011)	Peak position
Japanese Albums (Oricon)	1

=== Monthly charts ===
Chart (2011)	Peak position
Japanese Albums (Oricon)	4

=== Year-end charts ===
Chart (2011)	Position
Japanese Albums (Oricon)	29

== Sales and certifications ==
Region	Certification	Certified units/sales
Japan (RIAJ)	Platinum	250,000^{^}
^{^} Shipments figures based on certification alone.

== Release history ==
Region	Date	Format	Label
Japan	March 2, 2011	CD, CD+DVD; CD+DVD Limited Edition; Digital Download	Rhythm Zone
Hong Kong	March 11, 2011	CD; CD+DVD Limited Edition	Avex Asia
South Korea	March 18, 2011	CD	SM Entertainment
