= 2009 Taiwan Live =

Video by Koda Kumi
- Released: 10 March 2010
- Recorded: 2009
- Genre: Pop, R&B, J-pop, dance-pop
- Label: Rhythm Zone
- Producer: Koda Kumi

Koda Kumi chronology
Live Tour 2009: Trick (2009)	2009 Taiwan Live (2010)	Live Tour 2010: Universe (2010)

2009 Taiwan Live (stylized as 2009 TAIWAN LIVE) is the second Fanclub Exclusive live DVD released by Japanese singer-songwriter Koda Kumi. It was her first concert in Taiwan and received generally positive reviews by Taiwanese fans. She toured 4 days around Taiwan and performed in front of over 8,000 fans.

The DVD includes off-shot footage of Kumi's time in Taiwan, along with her personal commentary.

== Track listing ==
(Source)

=== DVD ===
1. "Black Cherry"
2. "Get Up & Move!!"
3. "Cherry Girl"
4. "Cutie Honey" (Live Jazz Ver.)
5. "Tsuki to Taiyou"
6. "Yume no Uta"
7. "Heat" feat. MEGARYU"
8. "Break It Down"
9. "stay with me"
10. "Moon Crying"
11. "Twinkle" feat. SHOW"
12. "Always"
13. "This is not a love song"
14. "Take Back" (Sunset in Ibiza Remix)
15. "Driving"
16. "Ecstasy"
17. "Physical Thing"
18. "Long Dance Part"
19. "Lick me♥"
20. Long Medley
  "BUT / D.D.D. / Taboo / Shake It Up / Crazy 4 U / It's All Love! / Ningyo-hime / Hashire! / Freaky / Last Angel / With your smile / Koi no Tsubomi / Ai no Uta (Remix) / Wind / girls"
21. "Butterfly / Cutie Honey"
22. "walk"
