= Gossip Candy =

2010 single by Koda Kumi

EP by Koda Kumi
- Released: July 7, 2010
- Genres: Pop rock; R&B; electro-funk
- Label: Rhythm Zone

Koda Kumi chronology
Can We Go Back (2010)	Gossip Candy (2010)	Suki de, Suki de, Suki de./Anata Dake ga (2010)

Gossip Candy is an extended play by Japanese recording artist and songwriter Koda Kumi. It was released on July 7, 2010, by Koda's record label, Rhythm Zone. Koda's fifth extended play, Gossip Candy consists of five recordings; Lollipop, Inside Fishbowl, Outside Fishbowl, For You, and a cover of Got to Be Real, originally performed by Cheryl Lynn. It was released in three different formats: Digital EP, CD and CD+DVD. The CD only version was re-released as the "Dream Music Park" edition with a bonus baseball cap. The Dream Music Park concert was later released on the CD+2DVD edition of Dejavu.

Gossip Candy contains predominantly pop-rock and dance music. Kumi contributed by writing the lyrics to all songs except Got to Be Real. Several composers were hired to help with the EP's content. Gossip Candy received favorable reviews from music critics who commended the EP's production and commercial appeal. It reached #4 on the Oricon Singles Chart and was certified gold by the RIAJ for shipments of 100,000 units. Lollipop, Inside Fishbowl, and Outside Fishbowl served as the promotional singles. Lollipop was certified platinum for 250,000 digital shipments.

Along with the success of the single, Lick me♥ reached #31 on the Japan Hot 100 chart on the week end of July 19, 2010.

Lollipop was certified platinum for 250,000 downloads in January 2014. Inside Fishbowl and Outside Fishbowl did not chart in any Japanese music charts, but were marketed as promotional singles by Rhythm Zone. All three songs featured an accompanying music video, which were included on the DVD version of Gossip Candy.

Gossip Candy was performed at the 2010 Dream Music Park concert in Japan. Lollipop, Inside Fishbowl and Outside Fishbowl were performed during Koda Kumi's 10th Anniversary: Fantasia in Tokyo Dome, and her Live Tour 2011: Dejavu. Inside Fishbowl was also performed during her Live Tour 2013: Japonesque. Lollipop, Inside Fishbowl and Outside Fishbowl were included on her Summer Single Collection 2013, while Lollipop appeared on her 2015 greatest hits album Summer of Love.

== Background and Composition ==
On July 1, 2010, Kumi announced the release of her summer single Gossip Candy while on her 2010 Universe tour. Kumi confirmed that the EP would include four tracks, which were untitled at the time. Gossip Candy is her fifth extended play single, one year after the release of her summer single 3 Splash. Gossip Candy consists of four original recordings and one cover song: Lollipop, Inside Fishbowl, Outside Fishbowl, For You, and a cover of Got to Be Real, originally performed by Cheryl Lynn.

Gossip Candy opens with the first track, Lollipop, which has been described as a pop and R&B song. A song that metaphorically describes men as "accessories", Lollipop boasts themes of erotica and kawaii culture. Both Inside Fishbowl and Outside Fishbowl feature the same lyrical content, but are arranged different: both are arranged and composed by Niclas Lundin and Joakim Hahlin. Both tracks were noted for its rock and electronic elements. Also, much like her 2006 winter single Yume no Uta/Futari de..., both tracks have similar melodies: one darker and one lighter. For You has been described as a low-tempo love song.

== Promotional Advertisements ==
Lollipop was used as the promotional song for 7-Eleven in Japan, Sony Ericsson and was chosen as the POWER PLAY song for NTV's Happy Music (HAPPII Music / ハッピーMusic).

Outside Fishbowl was used as the ending theme to the Japanese release of season three of Prison Break.

Inside Fishbowl was used as the ending theme for Guru Guru NAINTINAIN (ぐるぐるナインティナイン / Round-Round 99).

Got To Be Real was used as the promotional theme for Pepsi's new product in Japan, PEPSI NEX. The promo for the product was alongside Japanese band L'Arc-en-Ciel, who performed I Love Rock 'n' Roll.

== Reception ==
Gossip Candy received favourable reviews from music critics. Chris True from AllMusic highlighted Lollipop as a career stand out track from Kumi's discography. A reviewer from CD Journal complimented the production of Lollipop, labeling it a "gracious candy pop chorus". The reviewer also commended Kumi's "wide range" and "outstanding" vocal abilities on the EP. An editorial review from Amazon.co.jp complimented her "different" vocals and praised the songs "rich music".

On the Japanese Oricon Singles Chart, Gossip Candy debuted at #4, Kumi's lowest charting EP on the chart. The EP lasted eleven weeks in the top 100, selling 84,000 units, and was certified gold by the Recording Industry Association of Japan (RIAJ) for shipments of 100,000 units. This became her fifth consecutive EP to have shipped over 100,000 units since 2004's Love & Honey, 2006's 4 Hot Wave, 2008's Moon, and 2009's 3 Splash.

== Track list ==
No.	Title	Lyrics	Music	Length
1.	"Lollipop"	Koda Kumi	Ian Curnow • Julie Morrison • Jane Vaughan	3:23
2.	"Inside Fishbowl"	Koda Kumi	Niclas Lundin • Joakim Hahlin	3:29
3.	"Outside Fishbowl"	Koda Kumi	Niclas Lundin • Joakim Hahlin	3:28
4.	"For You"	Koda Kumi	Ryuichiro Yamaki	5:54
5.	"Got to Be Real" (Cheryl Lynn cover)	David Foster • Cheryl Lynn • David Paich	David Foster • Cheryl Lynn • David Paich	4:03
Total length:				20:16

DVD: music video
No.	Title	Length
1.	"Lollipop"	3:55
2.	"Inside Fishbowl"	3:25
3.	"Outside Fishbowl"	3:36

== Charts ==
Chart (2009)	Peak position
Japan Weekly (Japan Hot 100)	11
Japan Daily (Oricon)	3
Japan Weekly (Oricon)	4
Taiwanese East Asian (G-Music) (Note: G-Music positions refer to the combined albums and physical singles chart.) (Note: Week references for G-Music: "3 Splash" 2010 week 9.)	6

== Certifications ==
Region	Certification	Certified units/sales
Japan (RIAJ)	Gold	84,358
Japan (RIAJ)	Platinum	250,000^{^}
^{^} Shipments figures based on certification alone.

== Alternate versions ==
Lollipop

1. Lollipop: found on the single (2010) and corresponding album Dejavu (2011)
2. Lollipop [Pink Chameleon's Remix]: found on Koda Kumi Driving Hit's 3 (2011)

Inside Fishbowl

1. Inside Fishbowl: found on the single (2010)
2. Inside Fishbowl [Sunset In Ibiza Dubstep Remix]: found on Koda Kumi Driving Hit's 6 (2014)

Outside Fishbowl

1. Outside Fishbowl: found on the single (2010)
2. Outside Fishbowl [Sunset In Ibiza Dubstep Remix]: found on Koda Kumi Driving Hit's 6 (2014)
