= Live Tour 2011: Dejavu =

Video by Koda Kumi
- Released: 8 February 2012
- Recorded: 2011
- Genre: Pop, R&B, J-pop, dance-pop
- Label: Rhythm Zone
- Producer: Koda Kumi

Koda Kumi chronology
10th Anniversary: Fantasia in Tokyo Dome (2011)	Live Tour 2011: Dejavu (2012)	Premium Night: Love & Songs (2013)

Live Tour 2011: Dejavu (stylized as LIVE TOUR 2011 ~Dejavu~) is tenth live DVD by Japanese singer-songwriter Koda Kumi. It charted at No. 1 on the Oricon DVD chart and charted for a total of 11 weeks, selling over 35,624 copies.

== Track listing ==
Official Track list

=== DVD1 ===
- Opening Movie
1. Pop Diva
2. Black Candy
3. Lollipop
4. Okay
5. Aitakute
6. At the Weekend
  INTERLUDE MOVIE 1
7. Anata dake ga
8. Ai wo Tomenaide
9. Love is Over / Ienai yo / Swallowtail Butterfly ~Ai no Uta~ / Ai no Uta
10. Passing By
11. 0-ji Mae no Tsunderella (misono cover)
12. Suki de, Suki de, Suki de.
13. walk
  INTERLUDE MOVIE 2
14. Bambi
15. I Don't Love You!??
16. Hey Baby!
17. Melting
18. Choi Tashi Life
  INTERLUDE MOVIE 3
19. Encore:
  Be My Baby
  Megumi no Hito
  Dance Part
  Cutie Honey / Butterfly
  Poppin' Love Cocktail feat. Teeda
  You Are Not Alone
  Chiisa Koi no Uta
  Comes Up
  Lick me♥

=== DVD2 ===
1. Making of
  Video & Documents
  Fuji-Q Highland
  Maiko in Narikiri, Kyoto
  Complete Ranks!
  Private Fashion Collection
2. Live Bonus Videos
  Pop Diva
  Black Candy
  At the Weekend
