= Taboo (Koda Kumi song) =

- CD only artwork.

Single by Koda Kumi

from the album Trick
- B-side: "Always"
- Released: October 8, 2008
- Recorded: 2008; Avex Studios; (Tokyo, Japan)
- Genre: Dance-pop; electropop; R&B
- Length: 3:55
- Label: Rhythm Zone
- Songwriters: Koda Kumi; Hiro
- Producer: Hiro

Koda Kumi singles chronology
"Moon" (2008)	"Taboo" (2008)	"Stay with Me" (2008)

Music video
- "Taboo" on YouTube

"Taboo" (capitalized as "TABOO") is a song by Japanese recording artist Koda Kumi, taken from her seventh studio album Trick (2009). It was written by Koda, and co-written and produced by Hiro. "Taboo" is a dance-pop song that lyrically discusses several taboo subjects including sex and homosexuality. It contains numerous elements including electropop and hip-hop, and employs use of vocoder. It was released as the second single from the album on October 8, 2008 by Rhythm Zone.

Critical reception towards "Taboo" has been positive, with a majority of the critics commending the catchy chorus and its production. Several critics have highlighted "Taboo" as the album's and Koda's career stand out track. In Japan, "Taboo" became Koda's fifth number one single, and reached number six on the Asian–Taiwanese Singles Chart. It has sold over 88,000 units in Japan, and "Taboo" was certified gold by the Recording Industry Association of Japan (RIAJ) for shipments of 100,000 units. "Taboo" has been professionally remixed twice, and included on her remix albums Koda Kumi Driving Hit's (2009) and Beach Mix (2012).

A music video for "Taboo" was directed by Takashi Tadokoro, and features Koda in a mansion. Based on themes and exploration of homosexuality and sexual content, the video has Koda dancing in different rooms with female and male companions. Another video version was edited with longer bathroom and dancing scenes. "Taboo" was included on the set list of the singer's 2009 Trick tour, and the Premium Night: Love & Songs tour. "Taboo" and its music video has been widely considered an emphasis of Koda's self-described style "Ero kawaii", and has been notified as one of her "sexiest" and most well-known videos.

== Background and composition ==
"When I released Taboo, it felt like I destroyed the “Kuu-chan” image. I’ve also been told a lot that I always sing looking like ‘that’. But it's only because I thought it looked cool that I was able to make it my conviction. That's why I now have lots of fans who have come to accept and support me.

— Koda discussing how homosexual and taboo themes encouraged fans to accept her well-established sexual image.

"Taboo" was written by Koda, and co-written, produced, and composed by Hiro. Hiro was in charge of arranging the song, which included instrumentation of synthesizers, keyboards, and a drum machine. "Taboo" was one of two songs from Koda's album Trick (2009) to be co-written, produced, and composed by Hiro; the other song was "Your Love". It was selected as the second single from Trick and was released in Japan on October 8, 2008 by Rhythm Zone, a sub-label from Avex Trax. (Note: Trick released an extended play single, entitled Moon before "Taboo" in June 2008. While Moon is classified as an EP with more than four original tracks, and "Taboo" was released solely as a solo-single, Moon was marketed as a single from Trick.) The Maxi CD version of the single contains the B-side "Always", and includes the two songs instrumental versions. A bonus DVD format was released, featuring the music video, an alternative video, and making video to "Taboo". A third format, entitled the "Playroom Edition", was released with the radio and instrumental version of "Taboo" on a CD single. The Playroom Edition includes a special notebook and clear file designed by Koda. The CD versions feature Koda in a black dress with Koda and the song title placed on the side of the image; the DVD version features Koda in a mini jumpsuit.

"Taboo" is an R&B song that borrows influences from numerous genres including hip-hop, Japanese pop, and dance-pop. Tetsuo Hiraga from Hot Express noted elements of 80s pop and disco music. Koda's vocals are heavily processed through vocoder pyrotechnics, and are delivered during the chorus and parts of the bridge section. The lyrics to "Taboo" emphasize the term with the same name, discussing taboo nature and exploring it. Regarding homosexuality, Koda commented to Oricon; "Instead of trying stuff out and experiencing it, we put up a 'No' sign, we never try to break the taboos" and "Sometimes we shouldn't retreat into safety, we should have courage to do things. Those are the feelings kin the song." In terms of musical depth and lyrical diversity, Koda found that "Taboo" was one of her most "widen" tracks throughout her entire music career.

== Critical response ==
"Taboo" received favourable reviews from most music critics. Chris True, who had written her extended biography at AllMusic, highlighted the song as an album and career stand out track. Adam Greenburg from the same publication reviewed Trick, and was fairly positive; he found the first half was complemented by the "thumping dance track" "Taboo", and Trick album tracks "Show Girl" and "Stay With Me". Hiraga praised the song's production and Koda's delivery in the track. He complimented how Koda delivered in "full force", and created a "masterpiece" that was "violently and comfortably danceable" and "catchy". Hiraga then praised Koda's and Hiro's song writing for portraying homosexuality in an "erotic", "cool", and "emotional" way. A reviewer from CD Journal was very positive, commended Koda's and Hiro's song writing. The reviewer went on to say that "Taboo" is a "classic party song" and of Koda's most "exhibited works" to date. The reviewer also review the B-side "Always", labelling it a "pleasant eternal love song" and noted its "feminine" and "family" traits. Paige Lim from Straits Times labelled "Taboo" as a "hard-hitting dance song".

Greg from Selective-Hearing was favourable towards the quality and use of synthesizers, but criticized the House of Nation remix for being "crappy" and "disposable". A staff reviewer from Amazon.co.jp was positive, comparing Koda's "sexy and cool" single "But" and the "R&B dance tune" of "Freaky" to "Taboo". The reviewer went on to commended Koda's courage in writing a song about "forbidden acts". Connie from Jame-World.com was positive in her review, stating "The singles (from Trick) took her onto a new path in her niche in the Japanese music industry, particularly TABOO: it is sleek and edgy, while still maintaining her usual coy showmanship." She concluded by stating that "Taboo" alongside "This Is Not a Love Song" and 'Driving" on Trick "bring Koda Kumi into the new territory previously mentioned."

== Commercial performance ==
In Japan, "Taboo" debuted at number one on the Japanese Oricon Daily Chart with an estimated 24,000 units sold on its first day; it then reached number one on the weekly Oricon Singles Chart with over 65,569 units sold. (Note: Sales provided by Oricon database and are rounded to the nearest thousand copies.) "Taboo" became Koda's fifth number one single, and her first number one single since her 2007 single "Freaky". "Taboo" also became Koda's lowest-selling number one single, but was surpassed by her following single "Stay with Me" with 66,000 units. (Note: Koda's single "You" was her lowest selling-number one single with 48,000 units, and still holds underneath the sales of "Taboo". However, "You" was restricted to 50,000 limited copies.) "Taboo" lasted thirteen weeks in the chart, and sold nearly 90,000 units. "Taboo" was certified gold by the Recording Industry Association of Japan (RIAJ) for physical shipments of 100,000 units. "Taboo" charted at number seven on the Billboard Japan Hot 100 chart, and peaked at number two. "Taboo" was certified platinum by the Recording Industry Association of Japan (RIAJ) for digital shipments of 250,000 units.

== Music video ==
Koda Kumi (pictured) inside a small room with two other women. This scene features Koda being sexually seduced by the women, emphasizing Koda's intentional themes of taboo (homosexuality and sex).

The accompanying music video for "Taboo" was directed by Takashi Tadokoro. The video opens with Koda's name and the song title superimposed on a dining table. It shows several guests inside a mansion dancing and drinking at the table, and then shows Koda singing in a maid outfit. Small inter cut scenes features Koda kissing two women; one on the cheek, and one on the lips. This emphasizes the homosexual themes that Koda explained to World Journal and Oricon. Koda starts to sing in a living room, surrounded by several guests. She walks into a bathroom, and her maid outfit transforms into a small black jumpsuit, similar to the look from the CD cover sleeve of "Taboo". Several guests appear in the bathroom dancing and grinding each other, occasionally touching Koda until she runs away.

The second chorus has Koda walking into a small room, transforming her black jumpsuit into a cadet uniform. Koda becomes seduced by two women on the couch, and inter cut scenes feature Koda and the women dance to the song. As Koda is about to kiss one of the woman, a man see her and walks out of the room. Koda goes to find him, only to see him seducing a man in a small room. Smiling, Koda returns to the dining room in her maids outfit and accompanies the guests. The final chorus features Koda dancing in the dining room with the guests. The final scenes feature guests in the bathroom dancing, and Koda sitting down on a toilet.

An alternative version, under the title "Another Video", was directed by Tadokoro. This version features longer scenes of Koda in the bathroom and her dancing. This version was included on the DVD version of "Taboo". The original video has been included on the DVD version of Trick, released in Japan and China. The music video was also included on the DVD version of Koda's greatest hits album, Best: Third Universe.

== Impact and legacy ==
Several critics and publications online believed the music video and lyrics to "Taboo" was the reason for Koda's transition to a more sexual image, respectively. Tony Sokol from KpopStarz.com listed "Taboo" alongside "Juicy", "V.I.P.", "Shake It Up", and "Lollipop" as her sexiest videos to date. Regarding "Taboo", Sokol felt that the music video emphasized Koda's self-described style "Ero kawaii". Ero Kawaii was first established by Koda in her music video for "Cutie Honey" where she became the first Japanese musician to wear lingerie in a music video. J.R. Taylor from Coed said that "Freaky" and "Taboo" were "important contributions" to Koda's sexual image and Japanese music. Regarding Japanese music, Taylor felt "Freaky" and "Taboo" help regain sexual imagery in music videos and the Japanese scene, and that "many would believe that Koda's image is more important than her Urban tunes".

Despite this, "Taboo" left a controversial legacy towards Koda's sexual image and use of homosexual themes in future years. Her single "Ko-So-Ko-So", which featured Koda in bed with a woman was banned in several Asian countries. In a review for Koda's third greatest hits Best: Third Universe, which "Taboo" was included on, Ian Martin from AllMusic said in retrospect of the included tracks; "Koda Kumi is a performer who divides opinion in her homeland, mocked and hated openly by many in Japan, and with many of her fans reluctant to admit to liking her." In July 2015, after Koda publicly announced that she had low self-esteem, Tan Kee Yun from The New Paper stated that while "Taboo" and "Loaded", from her 2014 album Bon Voyage, focus on a sexual image, many of her songs focus on inner beauty. In March–April 2012, an online poll was hosted on Popjustice by fans ranking their favourite single by Koda. With over 70 singles from her back-catalogue listed, "Taboo" topped the list with thirteen people rating it ten points, and two people rating it the lowest score at eight.

== Live performances and promotion ==
On September 22, 2008, Koda performed "Taboo" for the first time at a special event called "Let's Party". The song has been included on several concert tours by Koda; it was first performed on her 2009 Trick Tour, where it appeared in the opening segment of the concert. Since then, "Taboo" has been included in the medley sections for her 2009 Taiwan concert tour, the 2010 Universe tour, and Koda's 10th Anniversary Tokyo concert. A remix version was included on Koda's Premium Night: Love & Songs concert tour. The song was then included on Koda's two concert tours; her 2014 Bon Voyage tour, and her recent 2015 Walk of My Life concert tour. "Taboo" has been included on two of Koda's remix albums: the KOZMR Lucas Valentine remix on Beach Mix (2012), and the House Nation Sunset in Ibiza remix on the bonus track edition of Koda Kumi Driving Hit's 5 (2013). The song has appeared on one of Koda's greatest hits, this being Best: Third Universe (2010).

"Taboo" was used as the theme song for the Nintendo DS Japanese video game, Saihai Yo Yukue. The video game was released on 23 October 2008. The song was used as the theme song for the NTV broadcast of the 2008 FILA Wrestling World Championships. The use of the song was to celebrate the 2008 championships which includes only the female freestyle event. It was used as the theme song to Avex Trax's Myu umo, MTI's Music.jp website commercial, and Koei's Future of Helm commercial.

== Track listings ==
CD
No.	Title	Lyrics	Music	Arranger(s)	Length
1.	"Taboo"	Koda Kumi; Hiro	Hiro	Hiro	3:55
2.	"Always"	Koda	Daisuke "D.I" Imai	Daisuke "D.I" Imai	4:26
3.	"Taboo" (House Nation Sunset In Ibiza Remix)	Koda; Hiro	Sunset In Ibiza	Hiro	5:44
4.	"Taboo" (Instrumental)		Hiro	Hiro	3:55
5.	"Always" (Instrumental)		Daisuke "D.I" Imai	Daisuke "D.I" Imai	4:26

DVD
No.	Title	Director(s)	Length
1.	"Taboo" (Music Video)	Takashi Tadokoro
2.	"Taboo [Another Edition]" (Music Video)	Takashi Tadokoro
3.	"Taboo" (Photo Slideshow)	Kazuyoshi Shimomura

=== Playroom Edition ===
CD (Includes clear file and notebook designed by Kumi)
No.	Title	Lyrics	Music	Arranger(s)	Length
1.	"Taboo"	Koda; Hiro	Hiro	Hiro	3:55
2.	"TABOO" (Instrumental)		Hiro	Hiro	3:55

- Digital music video
1. "Taboo" (Music video)

== Credits and personnel ==
- Koda Kumi – vocals, background vocals, song writing
- Hiro – composer, producer, arranger, song writing, programmer, engineer
- Daisuke "D.I" Imai – composer, producer, arranger, song writing, programmer, engineer
- Yuka Koizumi – mastering
- Sunset In Ibiza – remixing, arrangement, composing
- Takashi Tadokoro – director
- Rhythm Zone - management, label
- Avex Trax - parent label, management

== Charts ==
Chart (2011)	Peak position
Japan Daily (Oricon)	1
Japan Weekly (Oricon)	1
Japan Weekly (Japan Hot 100)	2
Taiwanese Singles Chart (Japan Hot 100) (Note: To search for "Taboo" chart positions, enter 2008 and week 41.)	6

== Certifications ==
Region	Certification	Certified units/sales
Japan (RIAJ) Physical single	Gold	84,967
Japan (RIAJ) Digital single	Platinum	250,000^{*}
^{*} Sales figures based on certification alone.

== Alternate Versions ==
TABOO

1. TABOO: Found on the single (2008) and corresponding album, TRICK (2009)
2. TABOO [HOUSE NATION Sunset In Ibiza Remix]: Found on the single (2008) and Koda Kumi Driving Hit's (2009)
3. TABOO [Instrumental]: Found on the single (2008)
4. TABOO [KOZMR Remix スグル・ヤマモト™]: Found on Beach Mix (2012)
