= Koda Kumi Driving Hit's 2 =

Remix album by Koda Kumi
- Released: March 31, 2010
- Recorded: 1999–2010
- Genre: House
- Label: Rhythm Zone

Koda Kumi chronology
Best: Third Universe/Universe (2010)	Koda Kumi Driving Hit's 2 (2010)	Eternity: Love & Songs (2010)

Koda Kumi Driving Hit's 2 is the third remix album released by Japanese singer/songwriter, Koda Kumi. It was released a year after Koda Kumi Driving Hit's on March 31, 2010. It ranked higher than its predecessor, coming in at #5 on Oricon and staying on the charts for twelve weeks.

== Track listing ==
(Source)

1. "Lick me♥" [Prog5 BIG BASS Remix]
2. "Driving" [GROOVE HACKER$ Remix]
3. "Ecstasy [Caramel Pod Remix]"
  44th single 3 SPLASH
4. "Cutie Honey" [MITOMI TOKOTO Remix]
5. "Rain" [PLUG in LANGUAGE Remix]
6. "Shake It Up" [HOUSE NATION Sunset In Ibiza Remix]
7. "No Regret [FUTURE HOUSE UNITED Remix]
8. "Last Angel feat. Tohoshinki" [neroDoll Remix]
9. "UNIVERSE" [Pink Chameleons Remix]
10. "you" [Floor on the Intelligence Remix]
11. "1000 no Kotoba" [Shohei Matsumoto & Junichi Matsuda Remix]
12. "hands" [The Standard Club PIANO DANCE Remix]
13. "Taisetsu na kimi e" [Ryuzo Remix]
14. "stay with me" [Tomoharu Moriya Remix]
15. "Yume no Uta" [Sunset In Ibiza Remix]
16. "Trust Your Love" [Terminal Vox Remix]
17. "love across the ocean" [Caramel Pod Remix]

== Oricon Charts (Japan) ==
Release	Oricon Singles Chart	Peak position	First week sales (copies)	Sales total (copies)
March 31, 2010	Daily Chart	4		43,032
March 31, 2010	Weekly Chart	5	25,127	43,032
March 31, 2010	Monthly Chart	37	42,286	43,032
