= 3 Splash =

- CD only artwork.

EP by Koda Kumi
- Released: 8 July 2009
- Genre: Pop rock; dance
- Label: Rhythm Zone
- Producer: Koda Kumi (exec.); Hiroto Suzuki; HUM; Shinjiroh Iuoue

Koda Kumi chronology
| It's All Love! (2009) | 3 Splash (2009) | Fever Live in Hall II (2009) |

3 Splash (stylized as 3 SPLASH) is an EP by Japanese recording artist and songwriter Koda Kumi. It was released on 8 July 2009, by Kumi's record label, Rhythm Zone. Her fourth extended play consists of three recordings; "Lick Me" (stylized as "Lick me♥"), "Ecstasy" (capitalized as "ECSTASY") and "Hashire!", with three additional interludes. It was released in two different formats: stand-alone CD, and a CD+DVD bundle - the latter bundle was re-released with a pink-transparent CD holder. The three artworks for the EP depicts Kumi posing with the title of the work superimposed over her. The CD+DVD bundle artwork features her holding a basketball, this artwork was also used for the digital release of the EP.

3 Splash contains predominantly pop rock and dance music. Kumi contributed by writing the lyrics to "Lick Me" and "Hashire!", while Japanese songwriter and producer Hum created "Ecstasy". Hiroto Suzuki and Shinjiro Inoue were credited as the EP's producers. 3 Splash received favourable reviews from music critics who commended the EP's production and commercial appeal. 3 Splash reached number two on the Oricon Singles Chart, and was certified gold by the Recording Industry Association of Japan (RIAJ) for shipments of 100,000 units. "Lick Me", "Ecstasy", and "Hashire!" served as promotional singles, while "Lick Me" was certified platinum for 250,000 digital shipments and nominated for a Japan Record Award at the 51st Japan Record Awards.

== Background and composition ==
In 2009, Kumi released two compilation albums: Out Works & Collaboration Best and Koda Kumi Driving Hit's. Following this, along with the release of a collaborative single with her younger sister, misono, Kumi announced plans of releasing a double album. The double album was to promote both her third greatest hits album, and a new studio album that consisted of unreleased material from recording sessions for her 2008 album, Trick. "It's All Love!" was later served as the studio album's lead single. Kumi announced that she would release a new extended play, marketed as a single, entitled 3 Splash, which would consist of three recordings: "Lick Me", "Ecstasy" and "Hashire!" with three additional interludes.

3 Splash opens with the first interlude, "09:00AM", which is an instrumental piece with "groovy" DJ spins and scratches. "Lick Me", the first tracks to include vocals, is an uptempo "cute summer number" with suggestive lyrics. "Ecstasy" is an electronic song with Kumi's "cool husky" vocals being heavily processed with autotune and vocoder effects. According to Adam Greenberg from AllMusic, Ecstasy "share[s] some ideation with Lady Gaga concepts, mixing sultriness with oddity and playing with the instrumentation and voicing along the way." The album's second interlude, "12:35PM", is another instrumental piece with "slow-paced" handclaps, and subtle urban undertones. Hashire! is a "distorted" midtempo dance song with influences of rock and pop music, and the EP is closed with a final instrumental interlude, "12:00AM".

== Promotion ==
Still from the music video "Ecstasy", showing Koda Kumi on a bike. This look was adapted on the CD version of 3 Splash.

3 Splash was released on July 8, 2009, through Rhythm Zone. There are three official versions: a stand-alone CD version, a CD+DVD version and a CD+DVD version which features an accessory pouch for the physical single. Each version featured a different cover sleeve, all with Kumi standing in front of a grey background: the CD version features Kumi in a black outfit (which she wore in her "Ecstasy" music video), the CD+DVD and digital EP version features Kumi in urban street gear (which she wore in the video for "Hashire!") and the CD+DVD version, which includes a pink-transparent CD holder, features Kher in a 60s-influence dress (which was worn in her "Lick Me" video). The CD+DVD bundle artwork features Kumi holding a basketball. This artwork was also used for the digital release of the EP. All three recorded songs were promoted through advertisement deals in Japan. "Ecstasy" was used for Music.Jp, "Lick Me" was used for the televised commercial of her Fever Live in Hall II concert, and "Hashire!" was used for the NTT communications advert Musico.

All three tracks served as the EP's promotional singles, released on July 8, 2009. "Lick Me" reached #2 on the Japan Hot 100 chart on the week end of July 20, 2009, which is her highest chart entry to date. "Lick Me" was certified platinum for 250,000 downloads in January 2014. "Ecstasy" and "Hashire!" did not chart in any Japanese music charts, but were marketed as promotional singles by Rhythm Zone. All three songs featured an accompanying music video, which were included on the DVD version of 3 Splash. An alternate version of the music video for "Lick me♥" was later placed on the DVD for her second pachinko game, Fever Live in Hall II.

All three songs have appeared on several live albums and compilations released by Kumi respectively. "Lick Me" and "Ecstasy" were performed during her Live Tour 2009: Trick, her 2009 Taiwan Live, Live Tour 2010: Universe, 10th Anniversary: Fantasia in Tokyo Dome, and Live Tour 2011: Dejavu. "Hashire!" has only been performed on her Live Tour 2009: Trick. "Lick Me" and "Ecstasy" both appeared on her 2013 digital compilation, Summer Single Collection 2013, while "Lick Me" was included on both Kumi's concept compilations: Happy Love Song Collection (2014) and Summer of Love (2015).

== Reception ==
Professional ratings
Review scores
| Source | Rating |
|---|---|
| AllMusic | (positive) |
| CD Journal | (positive) |
| Hot Express | (positive) |

3 Splash received favourable reviews from music critics. Chris True from AllMusic highlighted Hashire! as a career stand out track from Kumi's discography. Ian Martin from the same publication reviewed "Lick Me" and "Ecstasy" from the Universe album and was divided. For "Lick Me", he said, "She wears her sexuality on her sleeve, with song titles like "Lick Me" laying their erotic playing cards on the table from the get-go, and her lack of any recognizable singing ability compensated for by an awful lot of gumption." For "Ecstasy", he commended her "hard working ethic" in many songs, highlighting the song and concluded that, "All of this reveals a desperate need to achieve success no matter what, but also the humanity of the effort underpinning it." Greenberg commended the production of "Ecstasy", and said that "Lick Me" was "slightly off-tempo" that "brings Kumi back to more standard territory." A reviewer from CD Journal complimented the production of each song, and described the EP as "catchy" and "danceable". Hiraga Tetsuo from Hot Express was positive, who commended Kumi's song writing and the "summer" theme throughout the EP.

On the Japanese Oricon Singles Chart, 3 Splash debuted at #2, Kumi's third consecutive EP to have peaked at this position. The EP lasted twelve weeks in the top 100, selling 93,000 units, (Note: Sales provided by Oricon database and are rounded to the nearest thousand copies.) and was certified gold by the Recording Industry Association of Japan (RIAJ) for shipments of 100,000 units; this became her fourth consecutive EP to have shipped over 100,000 units, after Love & Honey (2004), 4 Hot Wave (2006), and Moon (2008). 3 Splash reached number eight on the Taiwanese East Asian chart. (Note: G-Music positions refer to the combined albums and physical singles chart.) (Note: Week references for G-Music: "3 Splash" 2009 week 28.) "Lick Me" reached #2 on the Billboard Japan Hot 100 chart, and reached #8 and #15 on the Japan Billboard Adult Contemporary and Radio Songs chart, respectively. "Lick Me" was nominated for the Japan Record Award at the 51st Japan Record Awards, but lost to Exile's "Someday".

== Track listing ==
CD-only version
| No. | Title | Writer(s) | Producer(s) | Length |
|---|---|---|---|---|
| 1. | "09:00AM (Introduction)" | | Yu | 0:42 |
| 2. | "Lick Me" | Koda Kumi | Hiroto Suzuki | 3:29 |
| 3. | "Ecstasy" | Hum | Hum | 3:28 |
| 4. | "12:35PM (Interlude)" | | Yu | 0:23 |
| 5. | "Hashire" | Koda | Shinjiroh Inoue | 4:10 |
| 6. | "12:00AM (Outro)" | | Yu | 1:07 |
| Total length: | | | | 13:18 |

CD + DVD bonus tracks / Digital EP
| No. | Title | Producer(s) | Length |
|---|---|---|---|
| 6. | "04:20PM (Interlude)" | Yu | 1:07 |
| 7. | "Lick Me (Yusuke Tanaka Remix)" | Yusuke Tanaka | 3:34 |
| 8. | "Ecstasy (Caramel Pod E Remix)" | Caramel Pod | 5:53 |
| 9. | "Hashire (420 Remix)" | 420 | 4:55 |
| 10. | "12:00AM (Outro)" | Yu | 1:07 |

Bonus DVD content
| No. | Title | Length |
|---|---|---|
| 1. | "Lick Me" |
| 2. | "Ecstasy" |
| 3. | "Hashire" |
| 4. | "Photoshoot slide show" |

== Personnel ==
- Koda Kumi – vocals, backing vocals, song writing, executive producer
- Hum – producer, song writing, composer, arranger
- Yu – producer, composer, arranger
- Hiroto Suzuki – producer, composer, arranger
- Shinjiroh Inoue – producer, composer, arranger
- Rhythm Zone – record label
- Avex Trax – parent label, management

Credits adapted from the EP's liner notes.

== Charts ==
| Chart (2009) | Peak position |
|---|---|
| Japan Weekly (Oricon) | 2 |

== Certifications ==
| Region | Certification | Certified units/sales |
|---|---|---|
| Japan (RIAJ) | Gold | 93,000 |

== Alternate versions ==
"Ecstasy"

1. "Ecstasy": Found on the single (2009) and corresponding album UNIVERSE (2010)
2. "Ecstasy (Caramel Pod E Remix)": Found on the single (2009)
3. "Ecstasy (Caramel Pod Remix)": Found on Koda Kumi Driving Hit's 2 (2010)

"Lick me♥"

1. "Lick me♥": Found on the single (2009) and corresponding album Universe (2010)
2. "Lick me♥ (Yusuke Tanaka Remix)": Found on the single (2009)
3. "Lick me♥ (Prog5 BIG BASS Remix)": Found on Koda Kumi Driving Hit's 2 (2010)
4. "Lick me♥ (Floorbreaker remix)": Found on Beach Mix (2012)
