= Koda Kumi Driving Hit's 3 =

Remix album by Koda Kumi
- Released: May 04, 2011
- Recorded: 2002–2011
- Genre: House
- Length: 68:16
- Label: Rhythm Zone

Koda Kumi chronology
Dejavu (2011)	Koda Kumi Driving Hit's 3 (2011)	Japonesque (2012)

Koda Kumi Driving Hit's 3 is the fourth remix album by Japanese singer/songwriter Koda Kumi. Like her first Driving Hit's, all of the songs are remixed by duo House Nation. It came in at #6 on Oricon, only staying on the charts for seven weeks.

== Background Information ==
While the album was set to release on March 23, 2011, it was postponed due to the disaster situation that was a result of the Tōhoku earthquake and tsunami. The new date was set for May 4, 2011.

== Track listing ==
Official track list

1. "Can We Go Back" (Prog5 Handz-Up Electro Remix)
2. "Pop Diva" (HOUSE NATION Sunset In Ibiza Remix)
3. "Bounce" (KOZM® Remix Lucas Valentine)
4. "Freaky" (Caramel Pod Remix)
5. "Driving" (ID3 Night Drive Remix)
6. "Moon Crying" (GTS SH Club Mix)
7. "Anata Dake ga" (World Sketch Remix)
8. "Unmei" (Shohei Matsumoto Remix)
9. "So Into You" (Sunset In Ibiza Remix)
10. "Lollipop" (Pink Chameleons Remix)
11. "Chase" (Caramel Pod Remix)
12. "Physical thing" (FUTURE HOUSE UNITED Remix)
13. "This is not a love song" (KOZM® Remix スグル・ヤマモト™)
14. "Good☆day" (JEWEL Remix)
15. "m•a•z•e" (UNITED COLORS Remix)
16. "With your smile" (GROOVEHACKER$ REMIX)
17. "come back" (PLUG in LANGUAGE Remix)
18. "Pop Diva feat. Far☆East Movement" (DJ VIRMAN REMIX) (Bonus track)

== Oricon Charts (Japan) ==
Release	Oricon Singles Chart	Peak position	First week sales (copies)	Sales total (copies)	Chart run
May 4, 2011	Daily Chart	2	6,890	25,000+	4
May 4, 2011	Weekly Chart	6	16,763	25,000+	4
May 4, 2011	Monthly Chart	11	24,732	25,000+	4
May 4, 2011	Yearly Chart			25,000+	4
