= List of Oricon number-one albums of 2010 =

The highest-selling albums and mini-albums in Japan are ranked in the Oricon Weekly Chart, published by Oricon Style magazine. The data is compiled by Oricon based on each album's weekly physical sales. In 2010, 42 albums reached number-one.

Pop singer-songwriter Hideaki Tokunaga's Vocalist 4 had the longest chart run of 2010. The album remained at the top of the charts from its issue date of April 20 to May 24.

The best-selling album overall of 2010 was idol group Arashi's Boku no Miteiru Fūkei, released in mid-2010, which sold 1,053,064 copies. The second-best-selling album was Ikimono-gakari's Ikimonobakari: Members Best Selection, which sold 906.756 copies, followed by J-pop singer Kana Nishino's To Love, with 645,417 copies albums sold. The fourth- and fifth-best-selling albums were Funky Monkey Babys Best and Sense by Funky Monkey Babys and Mr. Children respectively. Funky Monkey Babys Best sold 613,603 copies, while Sense sold 597,212 copies.

== Chart history ==
Key
†	Indicates best-selling album of 2010

Issue Date	Album	Artist(s)	Reference(s)
January 4	Hajimari no Uta	Ikimono-gakari	
January 18	Hajimari no Uta	Ikimono-gakari	
January 25	Olympos	Lands	
February 1	Next Future	Girl Next Door	
February 8	Whistle	HY	
February 15	Best: Third Universe/Universe	Kumi Koda	
February 22	Funky Monkey Babys Best	Funky Monkey Babys	
March 1	Best Selection 2010	TVXQ	
March 8	Sports	Tokyo Incidents	
March 15	Journey	Shota Shimizu	
March 22	Ureshikutte Dakiau Yo (うれしくって抱きあうよ; Happily Holding Each Other)	Yuki	
March 29	One Piece Memorial Best	Various Artists	
April 5	Trigger	Porno Graffitti	
April 12	Baby	Aiko	
April 19	Kamikyokutachi	AKB48	
April 26	Rock 'n' Roll Circus	Ayumi Hamasaki	
May 3	Vocalist 4	Hideaki Tokunaga	
May 10	Vocalist 4	Hideaki Tokunaga	
May 17	Vocalist 4	Hideaki Tokunaga	
May 24	Vocalist 4	Hideaki Tokunaga	
May 31	Exit Tunes Presents Vocalogenesis feat. Hatsune Miku	Various Artists	
June 7	Boku no Sundeita Machi (僕の住んでいた街; Town Where I Lived in)	Quruli	
June 14	Lovebox	Beni	
June 21	Fantasy	Exile	
June 28	No More Pain	KAT-TUN	
July 5	To Love	Kana Nishino	
July 12	To Love	Kana Nishino	
July 19	JUMP No. 1	Hey! Say! JUMP	
July 26	Holidays in the Sun	Yui	
August 2	We Are SMAP!	SMAP	
August 9	Heaven	Miliyah Kato	
August 16	Boku no Miteiru Fūkei †	Arashi	
August 23	Boku no Miteiru Fūkei †	Arashi	
August 30	Hadou	Koshi Inaba	
September 6	All Covers Best	Kobukuro	
September 13	"Wildflower" & Cover Songs: Complete Best 'Track 3'	Superfly	
September 20	The...	Junsu/Yuchun/Jejung	
September 27	Live	NEWS	
October 4	Still a Sigure Virgin?	Ling Tosite Sigure	
October 11	Request	Juju	
October 18	Request	Juju	
October 25	Glay	Glay	
November 1	8 Uppers	Kanjani Eight	
November 8	Ho-kago Tea Time II	Ho-kago Tea Time	
November 15	Ikimonobakari: Members Best Selection	Ikimono-gakari	
November 22	Ikimonobakari: Members Best Selection	Ikimono-gakari	
November 29	The Best Bang!!	Masaharu Fukuyama	
December 6	Utada Hikaru Single Collection Vol. 2	Hikaru Utada	
December 13	Sense	Mr. Children	
December 20	Sense	Mr. Children	
December 27	Cosmonaut	Bump of Chicken	

== See also ==
- 2010 in music
