= Alive/Physical Thing =

Single by Koda Kumi

from the album Universe
- Released: September 16, 2009
- Recorded: 2009
- Genre: J-Pop, synthpop, dance-pop, R&B
- Label: Rhythm Zone
- Songwriters: Koda Kumi, George Frideric Handel, Taro Iwashiro, Hugo Lira, Ian-Paolo Lira, Negin, Nosheen, Thomas Gustafsson

Koda Kumi singles chronology
"Fever Live in Hall II" (2009)	"Alive/Physical Thing" (2009)	"Can We Go Back" (2010)

Music video
- "Alive" on YouTube "Physical Thing" on YouTube

Alive/Physical Thing is Japanese singer-songwriter Koda Kumi's forty-fifth single and was released on September 16, 2009. It debuted at No. 1 on Oricon, making it her eighth number-one single, and charted for seven weeks.

== Information ==
Alive/Physical Thing is Japanese singer-songwriter Koda Kumi's forty-fifth single. It was released on September 16, 2009, and debuted at No. 1 on the Oricon Singles Charts, making it her eighth single to do so, and remained on the charts for seven consecutive weeks.

The single was released as a standard CD and as a CD+DVD combo. Both songs garnered their own music videos, though only the video for "Physical Thing" was placed on the corresponding album, Universe.

Contrasting each other, "Alive" was a slow ballad, while "Physical Thing" was a fast dance-pop track. "Physical Thing" was a cover of the song of the same name by British pop singer, Nosheen. Nosheen's version had been released a year prior on April 16, 2008.

The instrumental to "Alive" was based on that of famous 1700s German baroque composer George Frederic Handel's aria "Lascia ch'io pianga." "Lascia ch'io pianga" was from his most well-known opera Rinaldo. The original melody for the aria was found in Act III of Handel's 1705 opera Almira as a Sarabande.

== Promotional Advertisements ==
"Alive" was used as the theme song for the film adaptation of Kamui the Ninja: Kamui Gaiden.

"Physical Thing'" was used in a commercial for music.jp.

== Music video ==
Both songs received music videos on the CD+DVD edition of the single; however, only the music video of "Physical Thing" made it to the corresponding album, Best ~third universe~ & 8th Al "UNIVERSE".

"Alive" carried a simple visual of an aurora in the sky above a deserted wasteland, symbolizing rebirth. Along with the aurora, Kumi was also seen in a forest against a backdrop of the sunrise. The overall theme was how sadness could bring about rebirth, whereas the song was about moving on after losing a loved one.

"Physical Thing" held a party theme, showing Kumi smoking and drinking red wine. These were themes Kumi had not previously performed and was the last music video showing her smoking until her 2012 music video "Boom Boom Boys" from Japonesque. The visuals for "Physical Thing" were heavily influenced by American pop singer-songwriter Lady Gaga's music video for her 2008 song "Just Dance."

== Live Performances ==
1. 2009.09.12: Music Station – Alive

== Track listing ==
CD
No.	Title	Lyrics	Music	Arranger(s)	Length
1.	"Alive"	Koda Kumi	Taro Iwashiro	George Frideric Handel	3:42
2.	"Physical Thing"	Koda Kumi	Hugo Lira • Ian-Paolo Lira • Negin • Nosheen • Thomas Gustafsson	Hugo Lira • Ian-Palo Lira • Thomas Gustafsson	2:59
3.	"Alive" (Instrumental)		Taro Iwashiro	George Frideric Handel	3:41
4.	"Physical Thing" (Instrumental)		Hugo Lira • Ian-Paolo Lira • Negin • Nosheen • Thomas Gustafsson		2:56
5.	"TRICK" (Live Version from Trick Tour 2009)				3:06
6.	"Joyful" (Live Version from Trick Tour 2009)				5:34

DVD
No.	Title	Length
1.	"Alive" (Music Video)
2.	"Physical Thing" (Music Video)
3.	"TRICK TOUR 2009 Live Trailer"

== Charts ==
=== Oricon Sales Chart (Japan) ===
Release	Chart	Peak position	First Day/Week Sales	Sales total	Chart run
September 16, 2009	Oricon Daily Charts	1	16,246		
September 16, 2009	Oricon Weekly Charts	1	32,468	44,745	3 weeks
September 16, 2009	Oricon Monthly Charts	11			
September 16, 2009	Oricon Yearly Charts				

=== Billboard Japan Sales chart ===
Release	Chart	Peak position
September 16, 2009	Billboard Japan Hot 100	4
September 16, 2009	Billboard Japan Hot Top Airplay	12
September 16, 2009	Billboard Japan Hot Singles Sales	1

== Alternate Versions ==
Alive

1. Alive: Found on the single (2009) and corresponding album Universe (2010)
2. Alive [Instrumental]: Found on the single (2009)

Physical Thing

1. Physical Thing: Found on the single (2009) and corresponding album Universe (2010)
2. Physical Thing [Instrumental]: Found on the single (2009)
3. Physical Thing [FUTURE HOUSE UNITED Remix]: Found on Koda Kumi Driving Hit's 3 (2011)
