= Shidax =

Japanese food services company

Shidax Corporation (シダックス株式会社, Shidakkusu Kabushiki-gaisha) (JASDAQ: 4837) is a company providing food services and operating the largest karaoke shop chain in Japan.

== Divisions ==
Shidax is primarily in the food service industry with more than 3,000 locations throughout Japan. 60% of their business comes from serving food in hospitals, kindergartens, primary, junior high and high schools, colleges, universities, companies, restaurants and nursing homes. In 2005, Shidax was fifth in Japan's food service industry behind McDonald's, Skylark, Hoka Hoka Tai, and Yoshinoya.

The second largest division in the company is its Karaoke arm - which is what the company is best known for among the general public. Shidax Corporation has more than 300 karaoke shops across Japan, which operate under the name SHIDAX Please!. They are typical of the many big karaoke establishments and serve a wide selection of food and drink. Karaoke is approximately 40% of their business.

== Management ==
Dr. Ken Shida, the current President of Shidax took over the 50+ year old family business from his father.

== Overseas expansion ==
Shidax Corp in March 2013 said it will start catering services for corporate customers in Vietnam. It will take over 35 percent of the shares in Galaxy TSC Co., a Ho Chi Minh City-based catering firm, and change the name of it to Galaxy Shidax Co. The aim is to provide 200,000 meals a day in 2017.
