= Live Tour 2009: Trick =

Video by Koda Kumi
- Released: 21 October 2009 (DVD); 18 May 2011 (Blu-ray); 20 March 2013 (rental live CD)
- Recorded: 2009
- Genre: Pop, R&B, J-pop, dance-pop
- Label: Rhythm Zone
- Producer: Koda Kumi

Koda Kumi chronology
Fan Club Event 2008: Let's Party Vol. 1 (2008)	Live Tour 2009: Trick (2009)	2009 Taiwan Live (2009)

Live Tour 2009: Trick (stylized as Koda Kumi Live Tour 2009 ~TRICK~) is the tenth DVD by Japanese pop artist Koda Kumi. It charted at No. 1 on the Oricon Weekly charts and stayed on the charts for six weeks.

The limited editions came with a holographic cover and a bonus DVD.

The DVD is certified Gold for shipment of 100,000 copies.

== Information ==
Live Tour 2009 ~Trick~ is Japanese singer-songwriter Kumi Koda's tenth DVD release and sixth concert DVD. The DVD charted at No. 1 on Oricon, continuing her streak of number-one concert releases, which began in 2005 with Secret First Class Limited Live, and remained on the charts for twenty-nine weeks. Live Tour 2009 ~Trick~ had been certified Gold for over 100,000 being shipping, according to the Recording Industry Association of Japan.

The DVD was released as both a regular edition and a limited edition. Limited editions contained a bonus DVD with extra features, including the behind-the-scenes footage of the tour along with the rehearsals, and performances which featured artists Fergie, AK-69 and Kumi's younger sister, misono. These were performances filmed outside of the tour filmed for the DVD. The video featuring misono was a digest of all the performances misono took part in for the tour alongside her sister.

Live Tour 2009 ~Trick~ would later be one of the concerts released a musical CD for a limited time in 2012.

== Track list ==
(Source)

=== DVD1 ===
0. "Opening Movie"

1. "Trick"
2. "Taboo"
3. "Driving"
4. "show girl / BUT / Cutie Honey / Koi no Tsubomi / D.D.D. / show girl"
5. "Shake It"
  <Interlude Movie 1>
6. "Hurry Up!"
7. "That Ain't Cool"
8. "Ecstasy"
9. "Your Love"
10. "Moon Crying"
11. "Bling Bling Bling"
  <Interlude Movie 2>
12. "stay with me"
13. "you"
14. "Always"
15. "This is not a love song"
  <Interlude Movie 3>
16. "Winter Bell"
17. "Just The Way You Are / Venus / Lady Go!"
18. "Joyful"
  <Encore>
19. "Sweet Kiss / Ai no Uta / Someday / Sora / Love Holic / Won't Be Long / Butterfly / It's All Love!
20. "Hashire!"
21. "Lick me♥"
22. "walk"

=== DVD2: Bonus Footage ===
- "Behind-the-Scenes and Making of the Tour"
- "Special Guest Artist Collaboration"
1. "It's all Love! feat. misono" (Digest Video)
2. "Bling Bling Bling feat. AK-69" (2009.05.08 @Nippon Gaishi Hall)
3. "That Ain't Cook feat. Fergie" (2009.05.31 @Yoyogi National Gymnasium)
