= Can We Go Back =

2009 song by Kelly Clarkson

Song by Kelly Clarkson

from the album All I Ever Wanted (International iTunes Store/Japanese Edition)
- Released: May 13, 2009
- Length: 2:52
- Label: RCA
- Songwriters: Adam Watts; Adam Dodd; Shana Crooks
- Producer: Howard Benson

"Can We Go Back" is a song written by Adam Watts, Andy Dodd and Shanna Crooks and recorded by Kelly Clarkson during the sessions for her 2009 album, All I Ever Wanted. It appears in certain countries as an iTunes Store exclusive song on the deluxe version of the album, as well as a bonus track on the Japanese version of the album. It was then later recorded in Japanese by singer Kumi Koda in 2009 with differing lyrics.

== Koda Kumi version ==
"Can We Go Back"

Single by Koda Kumi

from the album Universe
- B-side: "Good Day"
- Released: January 20, 2010
- Recorded: 2009
- Genre: Pop; rock
- Length: 3:25
- Label: Rhythm Zone
- Songwriters: Koda Kumi; Adam Watts; Andy Dodd; Shanna Crooks
- Producer: Koda Kumi

Koda Kumi singles chronology
"Alive/Physical Thing" (2009)	"Can We Go Back" (2010)	"Gossip Candy" (2010)

Music video
- "Can We Go Back" on YouTube

"Can We Go Back" is the fourth single by Japanese singer Koda Kumi for the album Universe, and forty-sixth overall single. "Can We Go Back" became the first single to celebrate Kumi's 10th anniversary as an artist, with "Take Back" having been released in December 2000. The single charted at No. 2 on Oricon and, though it was a limited release, charted for four weeks.

The single was a limited release and Kumi wrote the song about the controversy in 2008, wanting to recognize her mistake and move on, going "back to the way [the fans] used to be".

=== Information ===
"Can We Go Back" is the forty-sixth single by Japanese singer-songwriter Koda Kumi, and fourth single released for her eighth studio album Universe. "Can We Go Back" became the first single to celebrate Kumi's 10th anniversary as an artist, with "Take Back" having been released in December 2000. The single charted at No. 2 on the Oricon Singles Charts, where it remained for four consecutive weeks, despite being of limited release.

Koda Kumi had written the lyrics to reflect on the controversy she experienced in January 2008 during All Night Nippon, in which she had made the comment, "At 35, women's amniotic fluid starts to go rotten, so I hope to have a child before then," after being asked if she hoped to have children someday. She said how the song was about wanting to recognize her mistake and move on, going "back to the way we used to be".

The single contained a B-side, "Good Day" (stylized as "Good☆day"), which would receive a remix on Kumi's fourth remix album, Koda Kumi Driving Hit's 3.

=== Background and composition ===
"Can We Go Back" was written and composed by songwriters Adam Watts, Andy Dodd and Shanna Crooks. Prior to singer Kelly Clarkson's solo version of "Can We Go Back" being released, Kumi had heard the demo version of the song from the original songwriters. After feeling that the song's aggressive tone matched how she felt at the time, Kumi picked the song to be her next single. While the English lyrics utilized in the Japanese version stayed the same, Kumi wrote the Japanese portion, keeping only the instrumental the same.

Adam Watts has worked with the likes of American musicians Jesse McCartney, Miley Cyrus and Demi Lovato. Andy Dodd is best known for his works with Colton Dixon's albums A Messenger (2013) and Anchor (2014).

The coupling track "Good Day" was written and composed by Yuta Nakano, originally from the group HΛL, which formed in 1996 (Yuta left the group in 2001). While Yuta wrote the song, Kumi wrote the lyrical portion.

=== Packaging and cover art ===
Despite being a limited release, the single was released as both a standard CD and a CD+DVD edition.

Both version contained the title track, the B-side "Good Day" and both songs' corresponding instrumentals. The DVD housed the music video for "Can We Go Back", along with the behind-the-scenes making video.

Both editions harbored different cover art, with the CD only showing Kumi with a full frontal, her chin tilted up towards the camera. The CD+DVD housed a three-quarter view of Kumi, with her teeth grazing the knuckle of her hand. However, both covers were taken on the scene setup in the music video where Kumi was bound to a wall, symbolizing her restraint of the past and breaking free for the future.

=== Music video ===
Koda in the music video.

The music video was shot by director Ryūji Seki (known in Japan as セキ★リュウジ). The video was given a Joan of Arc theme, to reflect "being in a battle with a friend, being injured and supporting each other" image intended to be expressed in the song.

The music video takes place on a battlefield with Koda Kumi and her back-up dancers dressed in clothes inspired by Hundred Years' War-era uniforms worn by the French military as they tried to raise their flag on the field. Koda Kumi is performing the song on a stage set on the battlefield as the video cuts to the story visuals. The dance break in the middle of the video was arranged by Hiro, who created the dance to reflect an overall feel of Michael Jackson, taking inspiration from the "Thriller" music video. The ending to the music video is shown with Kumi and her compatriots raising their flag in the style of French artist Jules Eugène Lenepveu's famous 1890 artwork Panthéon II.

=== Track listing ===
CD
No.	Title	Lyrics	Music	Arranger(s)	Length
1.	"Can We Go Back"	Koda Kumi • Adam Watts • Andy Dodd	Adam Watts • Andy Dodd	Adam Watts • Andy Dodd • Shanna Crooks	3:25
2.	"Good Day"	Koda Kumi	Yuta Nakano	Yuta Nakano	3:07
3.	"Can We Go Back" (Instrumental)		Adam Watts • Andy Dodd	Adam Watts • Andy Dodd • Shanna Crooks	3:25
4.	"Good Day" (Instrumental)		Yuta Nakano	Yuta Nakano	3:02
Total length:					12:59

DVD
No.	Title	Length
1.	"Can We Go Back" (Music video)
2.	"Can We Go Back" (Making video)

=== Charts ===
==== Oricon Sales Chart (Japan) ====
Release	Chart	Peak position	Sales total
January 20, 2010	Oricon Daily Charts	2	
January 20, 2010	Oricon Weekly Charts	2	36,565
January 20, 2010	Oricon Monthly Charts	8	
January 20, 2010	Oricon Yearly Charts	-	

Chart (2010)	Peak position
Billboard Japan Adult Contemporary Airplay	20
Billboard Japan Hot 100	6
Oricon Weekly Singles	2
RIAJ Digital Track Chart Top 100	6

=== Alternate versions ===
"Can We Go Back"

1. "Can We Go Back": Found on the single and corresponding album Universe (2010)
2. "Can We Go Back" [Instrumental]: Found on the single (2010)
3. "Can We Go Back" [Prog5 Handz-Up Electro Remix]: Found on Koda Kumi Driving Hit's 3 (2011)

"Good Day"

1. "Good Day": Found on the single (2010)
2. "Good Day" [Instrumental]: Found on the single (2010)
3. "Good Day" [Jewel Remix]: Found on Koda Kumi Driving Hit's 3 (2011)
