= Trick (Koda Kumi album) =

Studio album by Koda Kumi
- Released: January 28, 2009
- Recorded: 2008
- Studios: Avex Studios (Tokyo); Prime Sound Studios (Tokyo); Fine Arts Studio (Los Angeles) (Note: Track 9)
- Genres: Pop; dance; R&B
- Length: 58:54
- Label: Rhythm Zone

Koda Kumi chronology
Kingdom (2008)	Trick (2009)	Out Works & Collaboration Best (2009)

Singles from Trick
- 1. "Moon" Released: June 11, 2008; 2. "Taboo" Released: October 8, 2008; 3. "Stay with me" Released: December 24, 2008

Trick (stylized as TRICK) is the seventh studio album released by Japanese singer-songwriter Koda Kumi. It was released on January 28, 2009, and came in CD and CD+2DVD with the latter being a limited edition and the second DVD containing her Live DVD "Koda Kumi Special Live "Dirty Ballroom" ~One Night Show~". The limited editions of both versions carried the bonus track "Venus," originally released by Shocking Blue in 1969. The album continued her No. 1 streak and stayed on the Oricon charts for twenty-nine weeks.

== Information ==
Trick is Koda Kumi's seventh studio album and eleventh overall album. It continued her streak of No. 1 albums on the weekly Oricon Albums Charts, which began in 2005 with her compilation album Best ~first things~. Trick debuted at No. 1 on Oricon's Daily Chart with over 100,000 units sold in its first day. By the end of its first week, Trick sold over 253,000 copies, placing it at No. 1 on the charts, being her third album to reach the top spot. However, it was one of her lowest first week sales for a studio album since her 2005 album secret.

The album was released as CD and CD+2DVD. CD+2DVD was a limited release and carried the "Special Live "Dirty Ballroom" ~One Night Show~" concert she performed at Studio Coast in the Shin-Kiba district of Koto, Tokyo on October 23, 2008. The bonus secret feature on the second DVD could be accessed by clicking on the clown's nose on the menu screen, which was the rehearsals and setup for the show.

The first DVD carried six music videos, two of which were new and one, which was reedited for the album. The two new videos were "Just The Way You Are" (stylized as "JUST THE WAY YOU ARE") and "show girl." The reedited music video was the album version of "That Ain't Cool," which featured American singer Fergie – the original was released on her Moon EP. Bonus features on the first DVD included six secret videos, which could be accessed by clicking on Koda's left eye on the menu screen.

A full version of the album's introduction was later performed during her Live Tour 2009 ~Trick~.

== Editions ==
The album was released in only two editions: CD and CD+2DVD – a CD+DVD combo was never released.

- CD: contained fourteen musical tracks.
- CD+2DVD: contained fifteen musical tracks, six music videos and the concert DVD Special Live "Dirty Ballroom" ~One Night Show~.

The CD+2DVD also carried one bonus track on the CD: "Venus," originally released by Shocking Blue in 1969. Only limited editions of the CD only version carried this track.

== Music videos ==
Two new videos were made for the album: "Just The Way You Are" and "show girl." There was also the album version of "That Ain't Cool" featuring Fergie," which carried more of a story compared to its single-released predecessor.

"show girl" carried a Moulin Rouge theme. "Just The Way You Are" was filmed at the Nasu Highland Park in the Tochigi Prefecture on the island of Honshu.

== Promotion ==
"show girl" was used as the television commercial for music.jp.

"Your Love" was the promotional theme for Lixil Group's Tostem Group Home Finance.

"Venus" was used to advertise Gillette's Venus Breeze razor.

== Commercial performance ==
Trick debuted at No. 1 on Oricon's Daily Chart with over 100,000 units sold in its first day. By the end of its first week, Trick sold over 253,000 copies, placing it at No. 1 on Oricon's Weekly Chart, being her third album to reach the top spot. However, it was one of Koda's lowest first week sales for a studio album since her 2005 album Secret.

== Track listing ==
CD
No.	Title	Lyrics	Music	arrangement	Length
1.	"Introduction for TRICK"	Daisuke "D.I" Imai	Daisuke "D.I" Imai	Daisuke "D.I" Imai	1:17
2.	"Taboo"	Koda Kumi • HIRO	HIRO		3:50
3.	"show girl"	Koda Kumi • Kaoru Kami	Kaoru Kami • Tomokazu Matsuzawa		4:03
4.	"Your Love"	Koda Kumi • HIRO	Hiro		4:09
5.	"stay with me"	Koda Kumi	Kazuto Narumi	Daisuke Kahara • Strings Arrangement: Yasuaki Maejima	4:53
6.	"This is not a love song"	Koda Kumi • Steve Lee	Koda Kumi • Steve Lee	Pete "Boxsta" Martin	3:25
7.	"Driving"	Koda Kumi	Tomokazu Matsuzawa		4:20
8.	"Bling Bling Bling featuring AK-69"	Koda Kumi • Alex Geringas • Adrian Newman	Koda Kumi • Alex Geringas • Adrian Newman	Adrian Newman	3:53
9.	"That Ain't Cool featuring Fergie"	Koda Kumi • Stacy Ferguson • Keith Harris	Keith Harris		3:30
10.	"Hurry Up!"	Koda Kumi	Ryuichiro Yamaki	tasuku	4:01
11.	"Moon Crying"	Koda Kumi	Miwa Furuse	h-wonder • Jun Abe • Strings Arrangement: Udai Shika	5:43
12.	"Just The Way You Are"	Koda Kumi • Greg Critchley • Matthew Gerrard	Greg Critchley • Matthew Gerrard		3:42
13.	"Joyful"	Koda Kumi	Miki Watanabe	h-wonder	5:02
14.	"Ai no Kotoba (愛のことば / Words of Love)"	Koda Kumi	Kosuke Morimoto	Masaki Iehara	3:53
15.	"Venus" (Limited Edition Bonus Track)	Robbie Van Leeuwen	Robbie Van Leeuwen	h-wonder	3:26

DVD1: Music Video
No.	Title	Length
1.	"show girl" (Music Video)
2.	"Just The Way You Are" (Music Video)
3.	"Moon Crying"
4.	"That Ain't Cool featuring Fergie [Album Version]" (Music Video)
5.	"Taboo" (Music Video)
6.	"stay with me" (Music Video)

Secret Tracks
No.	Title	Length
1.	"show girl" (Making Video)
2.	"Just The Way You Are" (Making Video)
3.	"Moon Crying" (Making Video)
4.	"That Ain't Cool featuring Fergie" (Making Video)
5.	"Taboo" (Making Video)
6.	"stay with me" (Making Video)

DVD2: KODA KUMI SPECIAL LIVE "Dirty Ballroom" ~One Night Show~
No.	Title	Length
1.	"Cherry Girl" (Space Cowboy Remix)
2.	"D.D.D. featuring Soulhead"
3.	"Shake It Up" (Kazz Caribbean Remix)
4.	"Always"
5.	"come back"
6.	"Butterfly"
7.	"Bounce"
8.	"BUT"
9.	"Teaser featuring Clench & Blistah"
10.	"Hot Stuff featuring KM-MARKIT"
11.	"Amai Wana"
12.	"Hana"
13.	"Candy featuring Mr. Blistah" (Mad Reggaeton Remix)
14.	"Selfish~The Meaning of Peace"
15.	"Wind" (Portable Wind Mix)
16.	"Encore: TABOO; Take Back (Sunset in Ibiza Remix); Sora (Yukihiro Fukutomi Remix)"

Secret Track
No.	Title	Length
17.	"the Making of 「KODA KUMI SPECIAL LIVE "Dirty Ballroom" 〜One Night Show〜」"

== Charts ==
=== Weekly charts ===
Chart (2009)	Peak position
Japanese Albums (Oricon)	1

=== Monthly charts ===
Chart (2009)	Peak position
Japanese Albums (Oricon)	1

=== Year-end charts ===
Chart (2009)	Position
Japanese Albums (Oricon)	15

== Sales and certifications ==
Region	Certification	Certified units/sales
Japan (RIAJ)	2× Platinum	500,000^{^}
^{^} Shipments figures based on certification alone.

== Singles ==
Date	Title	Peak position	Sales
June 11, 2008	"Moon"	2	138,446
October 8, 2008	"Taboo"	1	88,479
December 24, 2008	"Stay with Me"	1	65,657
