= Moon (EP) =

Koda Kumi single

Single by Koda Kumi featuring Fergie

from the album Trick
- B-side: "Lady Go!, Once Again"
- Released: June 11, 2008
- Recorded: 2008
- Genre: J-pop; hip hop; R&B
- Label: Rhythm Zone

Koda Kumi singles chronology
"Anytime" (2008)	"Moon" (2008)	"Taboo" (2008)

Fergie singles chronology
"Labels or Love" (2008)	"That Ain't Cool" (2008)	"Just Stand Up!" (2008)

Moon (stylized as MOON) is the fortieth single released by Japanese singer-songwriter Koda Kumi. Much like her past summer single "Freaky" and "4 Hot Wave", Moon carried four songs. It charted at No. 2 on Oricon and stayed on the charts for nineteen weeks. It was released in CD and CD+DVD editions, with the limited editions of both versions carrying an alternate rendition of "Moon Crying".

== Information ==
Moon is Japanese singer-songwriter Kumi Koda's fortieth single. It charted at No. 2 on the weekly Oricon Singles Charts and remained on the charts for nineteen weeks.

The single became Kumi's first to be released after the controversy in late January of that same year. On January 30, Kumi made an inflammatory statement on All Night Nippon when asked about whether or not she wanted her then-manager to have children, whereas her manager had just gotten married. She had responded, "When women turn 35, their amniotic fluid goes rotten, so I hope they have a child before then." Her website had been shut down with a letter from Kumi posted on the page, apologizing for her remark. Due to the controversy, it was speculated that any following singles would not chart well, if she chose to continue releasing music.

Kumi had gone to say how the song's lyrics and overall tone were written as an apology and to reflect how much she had regretted the statement.

The single continued on with the theme of releasing a summer single with four songs, following "4 Hot Wave" (2006) and "Freaky" (2007). However, although the single carried four different musical tracks, it was only a double A-side with music videos only being released for "Moon Crying" and "That Ain't Cool".

For "Moon Crying", Kumi worked closely with musical composer h-wonder. The two had worked together several times in the past, beginning with her debut single Take Back in 2000.

"That Ain't Cool" featured American singer-songwriter Fergie from the hip hop/pop group Black Eyed Peas. Although both Kumi and Fergie were listed as the writers for the song, the song was mainly written by Fergie, who presented the song as a gift to Kumi upon meeting the artist.

Moon is certified Gold by RIAJ for shipment of 100,000 copies. It is her last single to pass the 100,000 mark in Oricon sales to date. Moon Crying was certified triple platinum for 750,000 downloads in January 2014.

== Promotional Advertisements ==
"Moon Crying" was used as the theme song for the TV Asahi drama Puzzle (パズル / PAZURU).

"Lady Go!" was used as the promotional song for KOSE's "Glamorous Hunter" under the Visée line.

== Packaging ==
Moon was released in both CD and CD+DVD, with limited editions of both.

- CD: contains eight musical tracks.
- CD [Limited Edition]: contains nine musical tracks.
- CD+DVD: contains eight musical tracks, two music videos and two making videos.
- CD+DVD [Limited Edition]: contains nine musical tracks, two music videos, two making videos and the "live version" of Moon Crying.

Limited editions contained an alternate piano arrangements of "Moon Crying" on the CD and a live version of "Moon Crying," which was performed on May 15, 2008, during her Kingdom tour performance at Yoyogi National Gymnasium.

== Post Controversy and KODA REKI ==
"It’s scary to talk in front of people. It’s scary to stand on stage. I want to quit being Koda Kumi."

— Koda Kumi, KODA REKI

In KODA REKI, Kumi's published biography, she said how she still cries when she thinks about the comment on All Night Nippon and hurting "many Japanese women." She goes on to say how it was that moment in her career when she realized how immature and unprofessional she was, not realizing how many people listened to her words due to her fame. She admitted how she had cancelled several rehearsals for Kingdom's corresponding tour, Live Tour 2008 ~Kingdom~, due to the severe anxiety she would get when she believed that she would walk out onto the stage to perform, only to have an empty arena.

== Music videos ==
"Moon Crying" carried a very somber tone about missing a deceased loved one and not knowing how to move on. In the video, Kumi's departed lover comes to her as a spirit, trying to tell her it's okay to move on. She becomes angry, but ultimately accepts his death.

"That Ain't Cool feat. Fergie" was directed by music video director and choreographer Fatima Robinson and was shot in Atlanta, Georgia. It premiered on MTV Japan on May 29, 2008, and carried a theme of two women (played by Kumi and Fergie) finding out that their lovers had been cheating on them.

An "album version" was placed on Kumi's seventh studio album, Trick, and featured a complete story line with Kumi and Fergie seeking retribution on the man that had been dating both of them without either woman realizing.

== Track listing ==
CD
No.	Title	Lyrics	Music	Arranger(s)	Length
1.	"Moon Crying"	Koda Kumi	Miwa Furuse	h-wonder • Jun Abe	5:45
2.	"That Ain't Cool feat. Fergie"	Koda Kumi • Fergie • Keith Harris	Keith Harris		3:31
3.	"Once Again"	Pushim	PUSHIM • Shunya Mori	PUSHIM • Shunya Mori	4:41
4.	"Lady Go!"	Koda Kumi	Kousuke Morimoto	Yusuke Tanaka	4:54
5.	"Moon Crying" (Piano Version)	Koda Kumi		h-wonder • Jun Abe	5:48
6.	"Moon Crying" (Instrumental)		Miwa Furuse	h-wonder • Jun Abe	5:45
7.	"That Ain't Cool" (Instrumental)		Koda Kumi • Fergie • Keith Harris	Keith Harris	3:32
8.	"Once Again" (Instrumental)		PUSHIM • Shunya Mori	PUSHIM • Shunya Mori	4:40
9.	"Lady Go!" (Instrumental)		Kousuke Morimoto	Yusuke Tanaka	4:52

DVD: Music videos
No.	Title	Length
1.	"Moon Crying" (Music Video)
2.	"That Ain't Cool feat. Fergie" (Music Video)
3.	"Moon Crying" (Making Video)
4.	"That Ain't Cool feat. Fergie" (Making Video)
5.	"Moon Crying" (from 「Live Tour 2008 ～Kingdom～」 2008.5.15 @Yoyogi National Gymnasium)

=== Charts ===
Chart (2010)	Peak position
Japan Oricon Weekly Single Chart	2

=== Sales and Certifications ===
Country	Provider	Sales	Certification
Japan	RIAJ	141,000+	Gold

== Alternate Versions ==
Moon Crying

1. Moon Crying: Found on the single (2008) and corresponding album TRICK (2009)
2. Moon Crying [Piano Version]: Found on the single (2008)
3. Moon Crying [Instrumental]: Found on the single (2008)
4. Moon Crying [GTS SH Club Mix]: Found on Koda Kumi Driving Hit's 3 (2011)

Lady Go!

1. Lady Go!: Found on the single (2008)
2. Lady Go! [Instrumental]: Found on the single (2008)
3. Lady Go! [DJ KOMORI Remix]: Found on Koda Kumi Driving Hit's 6 (2014)
