= Love & Honey =

- CD only version cover

Single by Koda Kumi

from the album Feel My Mind/Secret
- Released: May 26, 2004 (JP)
- Recorded: 2004
- Genre: J-Pop
- Length: 19:46 (CD+DVD); 22:23 (CD only)
- Label: Rhythm Zone; CD (RZCD-45129); CD+DVD (RZCD-45128)
- Songwriters: Claude Q, Takeo Watanabe, Kumi Koda, Sachi Bennett, Harutoshi Noda, Akira Ito, Miki Watanabe

Koda Kumi singles chronology
"Switch" (2004)	"Love & Honey" (2004)	"Chase" (2004)

"Love & Honey" (stylized in all caps) is R&B-turned-pop singer-songwriter Koda Kumi's eleventh domestic single. The single reached No. 4 on Oricon, making it her first single in the Top 10 since real Emotion/1000 no Kotoba. It stayed on the charts for thirty-five weeks.

== Information ==
Love & Honey (stylized as LOVE & HONEY) is Japanese singer-songwriter Koda Kumi's eleventh single under the avex sub-label Rhythm Zone. The single became her first to peak in the top ten on the Oricon Singles Charts since her 2003 single real Emotion/1000 no Kotoba, coming it at No. 4.

The single was released as both a standard CD and a CD+DVD combo. The two releases had slightly different versions of their second track, "The theme of Sister Jill". The CD+DVD version featured a short version of the song, whereas the CD only version featured the extended version of the song.

Both "Cutie Honey" (KYUUTI HANII / キューティーハニー) and "Yogiri no HANII" (夜霧のハニー / Honey's Foggy Night) were covers of the original opening theme ("Cutie Honey") and ending theme ("Yogiri no HANII") by Yoko Maekawa. All of the songs on the single were used in the 2004 tokusatsu film Cutie Honey and placed on the soundtrack for the Re: Cutie Honey OVA.

"Cutie Honey" continued Kumi's fashion theme of sexy and cute, which she began to don during her last single, Crazy 4 U.

While her choices helped her career to improve, it was still met with negative feedback by some of the public. The clothes she donned during the performance for "Cutie Honey" at Music Station were heavily criticized, whereas they were revealing and not something worn by mainstream artists in Japan at the time.

== Background narration ==
"Every day I felt 'I’m really doing what I want to do' and in response to that feeling, my single Love & Honey ranked 4th on the Oricon charts." – Koda Kumi

After the release of Love & Honey, Koda Kumi said how more fans would come to her events and the number of fan letters increased. She talks in KODA REKI how it was a time of trial and error. The attention she attracted with "Cutie Honey" was met with positive and negative responses. She was criticized for the clothes she donned at Music Station and when her sales dropped again (much how real Emotion/1000 no Kotoba did), she became discouraged and questioned her choices, but she refused to quit, believing in her own style.

"I usually got scared easily, but this time I pushed through my own ideas for the first time. I could take a big step in 2004 and love the person I became." – Koda Kumi.

== Track listing ==
(Source)

CD (CD+DVD)
No.	Title	Lyrics	Music	Arranger(s)	Length
1.	"Cutie Honey" (キューティーハニー/Kyutii Hanii)	Claude Q	Takeo Watanabe	h-wonder	3:08
2.	"The theme of Sister Jill [Short Version]"	Koda, Sachi Bennett	Harutoshi Noda	h-wonder	1:12
3.	"Yogiri no HANII" (夜霧のハニー/Honey's Foggy Night)	Akira Itō	Takeo Watanabe	Leo Nishikawa	3:46
4.	"Into Your Heart"	Miki Watabe	Miki Watabe	h-wonder	4:20
5.	"Cutie Honey" (Instrumental)				3:07
6.	"Into Your Heart" (Instrumental)				4:16
Total length:					19:46

DVD (CD+DVD)
No.	Title	Length
1.	"Cutie Honey" (Music Video)

CD only version
No.	Title	Length
1.	"Cutie Honey"	3:08
2.	"The theme of Sister Jill [Love & Honey Version]"	3:49
3.	"Yogiri no HANII"	3:46
4.	"Into Your Heart"	4:20
5.	"Cutie Honey" (Instrumental)	3:07
6.	"Into Your Heart" (Instrumental)	4:16
Total length:		22:23

== Chart history ==
Oricon Annual Single Top 100: No. 62

Total sales: 142,626 (est.)

== Alternate versions ==
Cutie Honey

1. Cutie Honey: Found on the single (2004) and corresponding album secret (2005)
2. Cutie Honey [Instrumental]: Found on the single (2004)
3. Cutie Honey [House Nation Sunset in Ibiza Remix]: Found on Koda Kumi Driving Hit's (2009)
4. Cutie Honey [Mitomi Tokoto Remix]: Found on Koda Kumi Driving Hit's 2 (2010)
5. Cutie Honey [Habanero Posse Remix]: Found on Beach Mix (2012)
6. Cutie Honey [Mikoto Tokoto Big Room Remix]: Found on Koda Kumi Driving Hit's 5 (2013)
7. Cutie Honey [JAXX DA FISHWORKS Remix]: Found of Koda Kumi Driving Hit's 7 (2017)
