= Walk of My Life =

Koda Kumi album

Studio album by Koda Kumi
- Released: March 18, 2015
- Recorded: 2014–2015
- Genres: J-pop; hip hop
- Length: 46:38
- Language: Japanese
- Label: Rhythm Zone

Koda Kumi chronology
Koda Kumi Driving Hit's 6 (2014)	Walk of My Life (2015)	Summer of Love (2015)

Singles from Walk of My Life
- 1. "Hotel" Released: August 6, 2014; 2. "Dance in the Rain" Released: November 5, 2014

Walk of My Life (stylized in all caps) is the twelfth studio album by Japanese singer-songwriter Koda Kumi. It was released a year after her previous studio album, Bon Voyage, on March 18, 2015. Continuing her streak of chart-topping albums, which began in 2005 with Best: First Things, the album debuted at No. 1 on the Oricon charts. The album remained on the charts for fourteen weeks.

Prior to the album's release, it had two preluding singles: "Hotel" and "Dance in the Rain", becoming her first album to only have two songs prior to its release. Walk of My Life was released in six editions, including a fan club exclusive, which featured her 15th anniversary performance at Studio Coast on December 6, 2014.

== Information ==
Walk of My Life is Koda Kumi's twelfth Japanese studio album (twenty-seventh overall) released on March 18, 2015. It debuted at No. 1 on the Oricon Albums Charts and remained on the charts for fourteen consecutive weeks. This became the tenth straight year for the artist to have chart-topping albums, which began in 2005 with her compilation album Best: First Things.

The album was released in six separate editions: a standard CD, a CD+DVD/Blu-ray combo, two limited editions through the site Mu-mo that contained a CD and a music card, and a limited fan club edition that contained her second limited live performance on December 6, 2014, at Studio Coast. Her previous limited live was done for her album Secret in late 2005.

Walk of My Life became Kumi's first album to have only two preluding singles: "Hotel" and "Dance in the Rain". Despite releasing the EP Fever: Legend Live prior to the album's release, none of the songs or their music videos were utilized. However, the song "Kimi Omoi" would later be placed as the coupling track to her 2016 single "Shhh!" and on her 2017 album W Face: Inside/Outside.

The music video for "Walk of My Life" introduced a new technique called "4D View." Forty-eight different shots were combined with 3D animation for the dance in the sky, which was to show the story of how her strength had grown. The music video was filmed in Times Square in the borough of Manhattan in New York City in the United States. This made the first time Kumi filmed a video on the east coast of the country, whereas she had filmed several videos on the west coast in the state of California throughout her career ("Run For Your Life," "Anytime," "That Ain't Cool," "Touch Down" and "Lalalalala").

On an interview for MTV Japan, Kumi described the theme of the album as "not how a person thought, but how they live."

== Packaging ==
The album was made available in six editions, with the CD portion of available versions featuring the sixteen musical tracks. The DVD and Blu-ray editions contained five music videos, two of which were produced for the album, "Like It" and "Walk of My Life." Both versions also carried the behind-the-scenes makings for the two new videos. The fan club edition was released as a CD+2DVD, with the second DVD housing her 15th Anniversary First Class 2nd Limited Live at Studio Coast concert, which was performed at Studio Coast in Tokyo on December 6, 2014.

Two music cards were also released for purchase, though they were only available until July 31, 2015. Both music cards carried identical content, although their image artwork varied. The music cards allowed buyers to download eight tracks from the album to either iPhone or Android. These versions were available through Mu-mo.

== Track listing ==
All lyrics are written by Koda Kumi.

CD
No.	Title	Music	Length
1.	"Introduction (Walk of My Life)"	Fredrik "Fredro" Odesjo, Anesha Birchett, Antea Shelton, Piox Pirovano	1:16
2.	"Dance in the Rain"	hir0ism, Ziggy, Melanie Fontana	3:17
3.	"Lippy"	Koda Kumi, Phil Anquetil, Bhavik Pattani, Christina Parie – Viktoria Hansen	3:16
4.	"Mercedes"	Koda Kumi, Maegan Cottone, Rick Parkhouse, George Tizzard, Jon Maguire	2:54
5.	"Like It"	Koda Kumi, Jared Cotte, Nejin Djafari, Fredrik "Fredro" Odesjo, Piox Pirovano	2:46
6.	"House Party"	Koda Kumi, Will Simms, Michelle Escoferry, Phil Anquetil	3:00
7.	"Interlude (Dance)"	LO, Linda Stark	1:00
8.	"Hotel"	Koda Kumi, H.U.B, Didrik Thott, Sebastian Thott, Ylva Dimburg	3:22
9.	"Gimme U"	Koda Kumi, Matthew Tishler, Andrew Underberg, Philip Bentley	3:18
10.	"You Can Keep Up with Me"	Sabrina Louise Bernstein, Paolo Prudencio pka Sharazi, Fredrik "Fredro" Odesjo, Piox Pirovano	2:40
11.	"Money in My Bag"	Koda Kumi, Bardu Haberg, Hayden Bell, Sarah Lundback Bell, Ylva Dimberg	2:35
12.	"Piece in the Puzzle"	Koda Kumi, Maegan Cottone, Bhavik Pattani, William Henry, Rick Wilde	3:05
13.	"Fake Tongue"	Koda Kumi, Emma Stakes, Steve Ware, Karl Addy	3:20
14.	"Sometimes Dreams Come True"	Toby Gad, Jessie J, Koda Kumi	3:05
15.	"Life So Good!!"	Hi-yunk	3:57
16.	"Walk of My Life"	Nick Carbone, Anthony Natoli, John Secolo, Peter Zizzo, Yukiko Tanaka	3:47
Total length:			46:38

DVD/Blu-ray
No.	Title	Length
1.	"Hotel" (music video)	3:27
2.	"Money in My Bag" (music video)	2:40
3.	"Dance in the Rain" (music video)	3:53
4.	"Walk of My Life" (music video)	3:56
5.	"Like It" (music video)	2:54
6.	"Walk of My Life/Like It" (making video)	6:50
Total length:		23:40

Fan Club DVD: 15th Anniversary First Class 2nd Limited Live at Studio Coast
No.	Title	Length
1.	"Dance in the Rain"
2.	"Hotel"
3.	"Money in My Bag"
4.	"Dreaming Now!"
5.	"Lalalalala"
6.	"Is This Trap?"
7.	"Koishikute"
8.	"Go to the top"
9.	"Love Me Back"
10.	"Ai o Tomenaide"
11.	"Poppin' Love Cocktail"
12.	"Pop Diva"
13.	"Suki de, Suki de, Suki de."
14.	"Lollipop"
15.	"Can We Go Back"
16.	"Physical Thing"
17.	"Lick Me"
18.	"It's All Love!"
19.	"Stay with Me"
20.	"Taboo"
21.	"Moon Crying"
22.	"Anytime"
23.	"Last Angel"
24.	"Ai no Uta"
25.	"Freaky"
26.	"But"
27.	"Cherry Girl"
28.	"Yume no Uta"
29.	"Ningyo-hime"
30.	"I'll Be There"
31.	"Koi no Tsubomi"
32.	"Someday"
33.	"Wind"
34.	"Kamen"
35.	"Ima Sugu Hoshii"
36.	"No Regret"
37.	"Candy"
38.	"Feel"
39.	"Lies"
40.	"Shake It Up"
41.	"D.D.D."
42.	"Birthday Eve"
43.	"You"
44.	"Promise"
45.	"Flower"
46.	"Butterfly"
47.	"Hot Stuff"
48.	"Hands"
49.	"Kiseki"
50.	"Chase"
51.	"Cutie Honey"
52.	"Crazy 4 U"
53.	"Gentle Words"
54.	"Come with Me"
55.	"Real Emotion"
56.	"1000 no Kotoba"
57.	"Maze"
58.	"Love Across the Ocean"
59.	"So into You"
60.	"Color of Soul"
61.	"Trust Your Love"
62.	"Take Back"
63.	"Documentary Movie" (Behind the Scene of Koda Kumi 15th Anniversary First Class 2nd Limited Live)

CD+Music Card
No.	Title	Music	Length
1.	"Dance in the Rain"	hir0ism, Ziggy, Melanie Fontana	3:17
2.	"Lippy"	Koda Kumi, Phil Anquetil, Bhavik Pattani, Christina Parie – Viktoria Hansen	3:16
3.	"Like It"	Koda Kumi, Jared Cotte, Nejin Djafari, Fredrik "Fredro" Odesjo, Piox Pirovano	2:46
4.	"House Party"	Koda Kumi, Will Simms, Michelle Escoferry, Phil Anquetil	3:00
5.	"Hotel"	Koda Kumi, H.U.B, Didrik Thott, Sebastian Thott, Ylva Dimburg	3:22
6.	"Money in My Bag"	Koda Kumi, Bardu Haberg, Hayden Bell, Sarah Lundback Bell, Ylva Dimberg	2:35
7.	"Life So Good!!"	Hi-yunk	3:57
8.	"Walk of My Life"	Nick Carbone, Anthony Natoli, John Secolo, Peter Zizzo, Yukiko Tanaka	3:47

== Charts ==
=== Weekly charts ===
Chart (2015)	Peak position
Japanese Albums (Oricon)	1

=== Monthly charts ===
Chart (2015)	Peak position
Japanese Albums (Oricon)	10

=== Year-end charts ===
Chart (2015)	Position
Japanese Albums (Oricon)	95

== Sales ==
Sales for Walk of My Life
Region	Certification	Certified units/sales
Japan	—	50,000
