= Winter of Love =

Compilation album by Koda Kumi
- Released: 20 January 2016
- Recorded: 2004–15
- Genre: Pop; R&B
- Length: 79:31
- Label: Rhythm Zone
- Producer: Jun Abe; Her0ism; H-wonder; Masaki Iehara; Daisuke "D.I" Imai; Shinjiroh Inoue; Daisuke Kahara; Susan Markle; Reo Nishikawa; Sizk; Tomoji Sogawa; Naohisa Taniguchi; Matthew Tishler; Tohru Watanabe

Koda Kumi chronology
Summer of Love (2015)	Winter of Love (2016)	W Face: Inside/Outside (2017)

Winter of Love is Japanese singer Koda Kumi's seventh compilation album, released under Rhythm Zone. It was issued in CD, CD+DVD/Blu-ray and CD+Fan Club DVD editions. The album features some of Kumi's top selling ballads, as well as two new songs. The track On And On was used as primary promotional song. The music video for On And On was the first music video strictly made for mobile phones. Kumi premiered the music video during a live broadcast on her official LINE account on 19 January 2016. It was released worldwide the following day. The full video kept the cellphone aesthetic, but was rendered to fit full screen.

== Commercial performance ==
WINTER of LOVE debuted at #1 on the Oricon Daily Albums chart and entered the Oricon Weekly Albums chart #2. The album also debuted at #1 on the Recochoku Weekly Albums chart.

== Track listing ==
No.	Title	Writer(s)	Producer(s)	Length
1.	"On and On"	Koda Kumi; Ylva Dimberg; Ollipop; Daniel Caesar; Ludwig Lindell		3:35
2.	"Kiseki"	Koda Kumi; Kosuke Morimoto	Reo Nishikawa	4:59
3.	"Hands"	Koda Kumi; Katsumi Ohnishi	H-wonder	3:14
4.	"Promise"	Koda Kumi; Daisuke "D.I" Imai	Imai	4:49
5.	"You"	Koda Kumi; Yoko Kuzuya	Tohru Watanabe	4:48
6.	"Yume no Uta"	Koda Kumi; Hiroo Yamaguchi	Watanabe	4:50
7.	"Unmei"	Koda Kumi; Hirofumi Hibino	Masaki Iehara	4:24
8.	"Aishou"	Koda Kumi; Reika Yuuki	Iehara	3:52
9.	"Ai no Uta"	Koda Kumi; Morimoto	Tomoji Sogawa	4:50
10.	"Moon Crying"	Koda Kumi; Miwa Furuse	H-wonder; Jun Abe	5:43
11.	"Stay with Me"	Koda; Kazuto Narumi	Daisuke Kahara	4:52
12.	"Suki de, Suki de, Suki de."	Koda Kumi; Katsuhiko Sugiyama	Shinjiroh Inoue	4:59
13.	"Anata Dake ga"	Koda Kumi; Markie; Sizk	Sizk	5:11
14.	"Ai o Tomenaide"	Koda Kumi; Naohisa Taniguchi	Taniguchi	5:27
15.	"Koishikute"	Koda Kumi; Jam 9; M.I	Iehara	5:13
16.	"Dance in the Rain"	Koda Kumi; Ziggy; Melanie Fontana; Her0ism	Her0ism	3:20
17.	"No Me Without You"	Koda Kumi; Matthew Tishler; Susan Markle	Matthew Tishler; Susan Markle	4:05
Total length:				79:31

DVD: Music Video
No.	Title	Director(s)	Length
1.	"Kiseki"	Takashi Tadokoro
2.	"hands"	Ippei Morita
3.	"Promise"	Takashi Tadokoro
4.	"you"	Shigeaki Kubo
5.	"Yume no Uta"	Kensuke Kawamura
6.	"Unmei"	Tomoo Noda
7.	"Aishou"	Tomoo Noda
8.	"Ai no Uta"	Tomoo Noda
9.	"Moon Crying"	Takashi Tadokoro
10.	"stay with me"	Takashi Tadokoro
11.	"Suki de, Suki de, Suki de."	Tomoo Noda
12.	"Anata Dake ga"	Tomoo Noda
13.	"Ai wo Tomenaide"	Ryuuji Seki
14.	"Koishikute"	Ryuuji Seki
15.	"Dance In The Rain"	YKBX
16.	"On And On"	Kei Ohta
17.	"NO ME WITHOUT YOU"	Ryuuji Seki
18.	"The Making of On And On"
19.	"The Making of NO ME WITHOUT YOU"

DVD: a-nation 2015.08.02 ~Koda Kumi 15th Anniversary Premium Live~
No.	Title	Length
1.	"Introduction"
2.	"STEP INTO MY WORLD"
3.	"Universe"
4.	"Bling Bling Bling feat. AK-69"
5.	"DJ HASEBE Part"
6.	"Teaser feat. Clench & Blistah"
7.	"Candy feat. Mr. Blistah"
8.	"Hot Stuff feat. KM-MARKIT"
9.	"Poppin' love cocktail feat. TEEBA"
10.	"HURRICANE"
11.	"MONEY IN MY BAG"
12.	"IS THIS TRAP?"
13.	"WALK OF MY LIFE"
14.	"Once Again"
15.	"V.I.P feat. T-PAIN"
16.	"Ima Sugu Hoshii feat. ZEEBRA / DJ HASEBE"
17.	"EX TAPE"
18.	"one feat. LIZA"
19.	"Lick me♥"
20.	"Lady Go!: Encore"
21.	"It's all Love!"
22.	"LALALALALA"

== Charts ==
Chart (2016)	Peak position
Japan Hot Albums (Billboard)	5
Japan Top Albums Sales (Billboard)	2
Japan Daily Albums (Oricon)	1
Japan Weekly Albums (Oricon)	2
Japan Monthly Albums (Oricon)	15
Japan Weekly Albums (Mora)	29
Japan Weekly Albums (Recochoku)	1
