= Hall Tour 2014: Bon Voyage =

Video by Koda Kumi
- Released: October 8, 2014
- Recorded: 2014
- Genre: Pop, R&B, J-pop, dance-pop
- Label: Rhythm Zone
- Producer: Koda Kumi

Koda Kumi chronology
Live Tour 2013: Japonesque (2013)	Hall Tour 2014: Bon Voyage (2014)	15th Anniversary Best Live History DVD Book (2015)

Hall Tour 2014: Bon Voyage (stylized as Hall Tour 2014 ~Bon Voyage~), is Koda Kumi's 13th concert video and coincides with her album Bon Voyage. It reached No. 3 on the Oricon DVD charts and stayed on the charts for 8 weeks. It was her first tour since Secret First Class Limited Live to not carry the prelude of "Live Tour," this time carrying "Hall Tour."

== Information ==
Hall Tour 2014 ~Bon Voyage~ is the thirteenth concert video by Japanese singer-songwriter Koda Kumi, and corresponded to her 2014 studio album Bon Voyage. Keeping in line with her previous concert video releases, the DVD debuted at No. 1 on the Oricon DVD/Blu-ray Charts; however, it dropped in ranking to take No. 3 for the week, remaining on the charts for eight consecutive weeks. It became her first concert tour to not carry the title "live tour" in the title since her 2005 concert Secret First Class Limited Live.

The tour was released in two editions, 2DVD and Blu-ray. The second DVD featured the live of the song "Money In My Bag" performed at the Kobe Kokusai Hall in Chūō-ku on August 2, 2014, the background video footage used for the performance of "Crank Tha Bass" and a behind-the-scenes document reel of the tour. All three tracks were available on the single disc of the Blu-ray.

While most of the track listing for the concert consisted of songs from Bon Voyage, several songs from other albums also made an appearance, including "Rock Your Body" from Feel My Mind, "Koi no Tsubomi" from Black Cherry and "Butterfly" from Best ~first things~. She also performed the then-unreleased song "Bring It On", which she would later release on her 2017 album W Face ~inside~.

== Track list ==
(Official Track List)

=== DVD1 ===
1. "Let's show tonight"
2. "Winner Girls"
3. "Show Me Your Holla"
4. "Rock Your Body"
5. "Everyday"
6. "Butterfly"
  (Interlude movie 1)
7. "Yume no Uta"
8. "Koishikute"
9. "Imagine"
  ~Band Introduce~
10. "Koi no Tsubomi"
11. "Special Medley"
  ~real Emotion / Last Angel / Go to the top / Crazy 4 U / Gentle Words / Anata Dake ga / Take Back / TABOO / Lady Go!~
  (Interlude movie 2)
12. "Crank Tha Bass"
  ~Dance Part~
13. "Touch Down"
14. "LOL"
15. "XXX"
16. "Is This Trap?"
17. "Dreaming Now!"
18. "LOADED feat. Sean Paul"
  (Interlude movie 3)
  ~Encore~
19. "U KNOW"
20. "LALALALALA"
21. "Bring It On"
22. "walk"

=== DVD2 ===
1. "Money In My Bag LIVE MOVIE" (New Song Performed in 2014.08.02 @Kobe Kokusai Kaikan)
2. "Crank Tha Bass" LIVE BACKGROUND MOVIE
3. "Koda Kumi Hall Tour 2014 ~Bon Voyage~ document real"

== Show dates ==
Koda Kumi Bon Voyage Tour 2014
- Tour by Koda Kumi
- Associated album: Bon Voyage
- Start date: March 12, 2014
- End date: August 16, 2014
- Legs: 1
- No. of shows: 51

Koda Kumi concert chronology
- Live Tour 2013: Japonesque (2013); Bon Voyage Live Tour (2014); Live Tour 2015: Walk of My Life (2015)

Koda Kumi Live Tour 2014 ~Bon Voyage~
Date	City	Country	Venue	Attendance
March 12, 2014	Osaka	Japan	Osaka Festival Hall	130,000
March 13, 2014	Osaka	Japan	Osaka Festival Hall	130,000
March 15, 2014	Osaka	Japan	Osaka Festival Hall	130,000
March 16, 2014	Osaka	Japan	Osaka Festival Hall	130,000
March 21, 2014	Kanazawa	Japan	Honda no Mori Hall	130,000
March 23, 2014	Niigata	Japan	Niigata Prefectural Hall	130,000
March 28, 2014	Aomori	Japan	Aomori City Culture Hall	130,000
March 29, 2014	Aomori	Japan	Aomori City Culture Hall	130,000
April 4, 2014	Fukuoka	Japan	Fukuoka Sun Palace	130,000
April 5, 2014	Fukuoka	Japan	Fukuoka Sun Palace	130,000
April 6, 2014	Fukuoka	Japan	Fukuoka Sun Palace	130,000
April 11, 2014	Nagano	Japan	Nagano Hokuto Culture Hall	130,000
April 12, 2014	Nagano	Japan	Nagano Hokuto Culture Hall	130,000
April 18, 2014	Sapporo	Japan	Nitori Culture Hall	130,000
April 19, 2014	Sapporo	Japan	Nitori Culture Hall	130,000
April 26, 2014	Hiroshima	Japan	Hiroshima Culture Hall	130,000
April 27, 2014	Hiroshima	Japan	Hiroshima Culture Hall	130,000
May 3, 2014	Sendai	Japan	Sendai Sun Plaza Hall	130,000
May 4, 2014	Sendai	Japan	Sendai Sun Plaza Hall	130,000
May 6, 2014	Morioka	Japan	Iwate Prefectural Hall	130,000
May 10, 2014	Kobe	Japan	Kobe International Exhibition Hall	130,000
May 11, 2014	Kobe	Japan	Kobe International Exhibition Hall	130,000
May 21, 2014	Yokohama	Japan	Pacifico Yokohama	130,000
May 22, 2014	Yokohama	Japan	Pacifico Yokohama	130,000
May 30, 2014	Shizuoka	Japan	Shizuoka Shimin Bunka Kaikan	130,000
May 31, 2014	Shizuoka	Japan	Shizuoka Shimin Bunka Kaikan	130,000
June 1, 2014	Shizuoka	Japan	Shizuoka Shimin Bunka Kaikan	130,000
June 6, 2014	Ōita	Japan	Oita Iichiko Grand Hall	130,000
June 7, 2014	Nagasaki	Japan	Nagasaki Brick Hall	130,000
June 14, 2014	Kōriyama	Japan	Koriyama Shimin Bunka Center	130,000
June 18, 2014	Tokyo	Japan	Tokyo NHK Hall	130,000
June 21, 2014	Utsunomiya	Japan	Utsunomiya Bunka Kaikan	130,000
June 22, 2014	Utsunomiya	Japan	Utsunomiya Bunka Kaikan	130,000
June 27, 2014	Kurashiki	Japan	Kurashiki Civic Hall	130,000
June 28, 2014	Yonago	Japan	Yonago Convention Center	130,000
July 2, 2014	Nagoya	Japan	Nagoya Congress Center	130,000
July 3, 2014	Nagoya	Japan	Nagoya Congress Center	130,000
July 12, 2014	Kofu	Japan	Yamanashi Culture Hall	130,000
July 16, 2014	Osaka	Japan	Osaka Festival Hall	130,000
July 17, 2014	Osaka	Japan	Osaka Festival Hall	130,000
July 19, 2014	Matsuyama	Japan	Himegin Hall	130,000
July 24, 2014	Tokyo	Japan	Tokyo International Forum	130,000
July 25, 2014	Tokyo	Japan	Tokyo International Forum	130,000
July 31, 2014	Ichikawa	Japan	Ichikawa City Cultural Center	130,000
August 16, 2014	Taipei	Taiwan	Taipei Nangang Exhibition Center	130,000

== Charts (Japan) ==
Oricon Sales Chart (Japan)

Release	Chart	Peak position
October 8, 2014	Oricon DVD Charts	3
