= Live Tour 2013: Japonesque =

Live Tour 2013 Japonesque

Video by Koda Kumi
- Released: 4 December 2013
- Recorded: 2013
- Genre: Pop, R&B, J-pop, dance-pop
- Label: Rhythm Zone
- Producer: Koda Kumi

Koda Kumi chronology
Premium Night: Love & Songs (2012)	Live Tour 2013; Japonesque (2013)	Hall Tour 2014: Bon Voyage (2014)

Live Tour 2013: Japonesque (stylized as KODA KUMI LIVE TOUR 2013 ~JAPONESQUE~) is the twelfth live video by Japanese singer-songwriter Koda Kumi. It was released in DVD (2 discs) and Blu-ray formats on 4 December 2013.

The first press of both version has included a cardboard calendar and stand calendar for fanclub members only.

== Information ==
Live Tour 2013 ~Japonesque~ is Japanese singer-songwriter Kumi Koda's twelfth concert DVD. While it debuted at No. 1 on the Oricon Live charts, it dropped to No. 2 for the weekly ranking; it remained on the charts for over two months.

The DVD was released in 2DVD format, with the second DVD containing bonus footage, which included behind-the-scenes of the tour and the background videos used for some of the songs performed. The concert DVD was also released on Blu-ray. This made it her first live tour to be released in the Blu-ray format.

The first press editions also included a cardboard slipcase, while a standing calendar was included for fan club members.

== Track list ==
(Source)

=== DVD1 ===
<Opening Movie>

1. "So Nice feat. Mr. Blistah"
2. "D.D.D."
3. "Jounetsu"
4. "Ai o Tomenaide"
5. "Sayonara no Mukougawa"
6. "KO-SO-KO-SO"
7. "V.I.P feat. T-Pain"
8. "Pink Spider"
9. "Escalate"
10. "Slow feat. Omarion"
11. "Dance Part I"
12. "Black Cherry Introduction
  "Juicy (Remix)
  "Hot Stuff feat. KM-MARKIT (Remix)
  "Taboo"
13. "Dance Part II"
14. "Is This Trap?"
15. "Alone"
16. "Koishikute"
17. "darling" (Acoustic Ver.)
18. "Ai no Uta" (Acoustic Ver.)
19. "Brave"
20. "In The Air"
21. "Boom Boom Boys"
22. "Bling Bling Bling"
23. "No Man's Land"
24. "Outside Fishbowl"
  "Freaky"
  "Selfish"
  "Love Me Back"
25. "Be My Baby"
26. "Poppin' love cocktail feat. TEEDA"
  Encore
27. "Lady Go!"
28. "Cutie Honey"
29. "Lovely"
30. "Shake Hip!"
31. "LALALALALA"
32. "All for you"
33. "walk ~to the future~"
  Double Encore
34. "LALALALALA"

=== DVD2 ===
1. "Bonus Movie"
  "Koda Kumi Live Tour 2013 ~Japonesque~ Making"
  "Koda Kumi Live Tour 2013 ~Japonesque~ Interlude Movie"

== Show dates ==
Japonesque Live Tour 2013
- Tour by Koda Kumi
- Location: Japan
- Associated album: Japonesque
- Start date: 16 March 2013
- End date: 30 June 2013
- Legs: 1
- No. of shows: 16

Koda Kumi concert chronology
- Live Tour 2011: Dejavu (2011); Live Tour 2013: Japonesque (2013); Hall Tour 2014: Bon Voyage (2014)

Koda Kumi Live Tour 2013 ~Japonesque~
Date	City	Venue	Attendance
16 March 2013	Saitama	Saitama Super Arena	150,000
17 March 2013	Saitama	Saitama Super Arena	150,000
6 April 2013	Fukuoka	Marine Messe Fukuoka	150,000
7 April 2013	Fukuoka	Marine Messe Fukuoka	150,000
20 April 2013	Aomori	Sanwa Arena	150,000
27 April 2013	Nagano	Big Hat	150,000
3 May 2013	Nagoya	Nippon Gaishi Hall	150,000
4 May 2013	Nagoya	Nippon Gaishi Hall	150,000
9 May 2013	Osaka	Osaka-jō Hall	150,000
10 May 2013	Osaka	Osaka-jō Hall	150,000
25 May 2013	Shizuoka	Ecopa Arena	150,000
1 June 2013	Sapporo	Hokkai Kitayell	150,000
21 June 2013	Osaka	Osaka-jō Hall	150,000
22 June 2013	Osaka	Osaka-jō Hall	150,000
29 June 2013	Yokohama	Yokohama Cultural Gymnasium	150,000
30 June 2013	Yokohama	Yokohama Cultural Gymnasium	150,000
