= Premium Night: Love & Songs =

Video by Koda Kumi
- Released: 20 March 2013
- Recorded: 2012
- Genre: Pop, R&B, J-pop, dance-pop
- Label: Rhythm Zone
- Producer: Koda Kumi

Koda Kumi chronology
Live Tour 2011: Dejavu (2012)	Premium Night: Love & Songs (2013)	Live Tour 2013: Japonesque (2013)

Premium Night: Love & Songs (stylized as Koda Kumi Premium Night ~Love & Songs~) is the eleventh live DVD by Japanese singer-songwriter Koda Kumi. It is video footage of a concert which was held in Nippon Budoukan for celebrate Koda's 30th birthday. It is her first concert after giving birth.

It was released in 2 DVDs and Blu-ray format. Rental live CD was also released on the same day as well as 5 other live CDs with her previous concert. Driving Hit's 5 was also released on the same day.

== Track list ==
Official Track list.
DVD1

1. "Opening Movie"
2. "Ai no Kotoba"
3. "show girl"
4. "Butterfly"
5. "Gentle Words"
6. "Taisetsu na Kimi e / anytime / Promise / Suki de, suki de, suki de / flower"
7. "Crazy 4 U"
8. "Dance Part"
9. "1000 no Kotoba"
10. "hands"
11. "you"
12. "Rain"
13. "Pearl Moon"
14. "Ai no Uta"
15. "Anata Dake Ga / Unmei / come back / Brave"
16. "Moon Crying"
17. "Someday"
18. "DJ Part"
19. "Pop Diva (Remix)"
20. "Taboo (Remix)"
21. "Universe"
22. "Go to the top"
23. "Take Back"
24. "All for You"
25. "walk ~to the future~"
26. "Comes Up"
27. "Lady Go!"

DVD2

1. "Making Footage"
2. "Encore: Koishikute" (Bonus Footage)
3. "Surprise Footage" (Bonus Footage)
