= Bon Voyage (Koda Kumi album) =

- CD & DVD, and digital cover

Studio album by Koda Kumi
- Released: February 26, 2014
- Recorded: 2012–13
- Genres: Dance-pop; pop; R&B
- Length: 53:21
- Label: Rhythm Zone
- Producers: Joseph Lawrence; Toby Gad; T-SK; Mussashi; Mats Lie Skare; Figge Bosstrom; UTA; Will Simms; Tommy Henriksen; Badur Haberg; Clarabell; Mitsu. J

Koda Kumi chronology
| Driving Hit's 5 (2013) | Bon Voyage (2014) | Driving Hit's 6 (2014) |

Singles from Bon Voyage
- 1. "Go to the Top" Released: October 24, 2012; 2. "Koishikute" Released: December 26, 2012; 3. "Summer Trip" Released: July 31, 2013; 4. "Dreaming Now!" Released: November 13, 2013

Bon Voyage is the eleventh studio album by Japanese recording artist Koda Kumi. It was released on February 26, 2014, by Rhythm Zone. Bon Voyage is Koda's first album since her 2012 Japonesque, and her longest album in production since her 2008 studio album Kingdom. The album's production was handled by several music producers, such as Joseph Lawrence, Toby Gad, T-Sk, Mats Lie Skare, Figge Bosstrom, Tommy Henriksen, Badur Haberg, and Clarabell. It also features guest appearances from Sean Paul and OVDS. Five different formats were released to promote the album: a standalone CD, a CD and DVD bundle, a CD and Blu-ray bundle, a fan package featuring a live DVD, and a digital release in Japan.

Upon the album's release, it was met with favourable reviews from music critics. Critics highlight individual songs for their production and composition, and commended the singles. Bon Voyage became Koda's seventh studio album to reach the top spot on Japan's Oricon Albums Chart, but her first album to not ship over 100,000 units in that region. Because of this, it became her first studio album to fail to achieve a certification by the Recording Industry Association of Japan (RIAJ). Three singles and one EP were released from the album. Koda promoted the album through her 2014 Bon Voyage concert tour.

== Development and composition ==
Bon Voyage is Koda's first album since her 2012 Japonesque. It is also her longest album in production since her 2008 studio album Kingdom, both of which spanned a total of two years. For the album, Koda's record label Rhythm Zone and its parent company Avex Trax hired several producers, such as Joseph Lawrence, Toby Gad, T-Sk, Mats Lie Skare, Figge Bosstrom, Tommy Henriksen, Badur Haberg, and Clarabell. Producers such as Henriksen and Bosstrom have collaborated with Koda in the past with her albums Kingdom and Universe (2010). Bon Voyage is Koda's second album to be handled primarily with Western producers and composers; Koda's first album handled by Western producers was Japonesque. Western producers and composers carried on working with Koda on her next studio album Walk of My Life (2015).

Bon Voyage is a J-pop album with numerous elements of country rock, pop, R&B, electronic dance music, and reggae. It is Koda's first album to emphasize full English language songs; in total, Bon Voyage features nine English, five bilingual (Japanese/English), and two Japanese tracks. (Note: According to the album notes and accompanying lyric sheet, there are nine English ("Introduction", "Show Me Your Holla", "Loaded", "Let's Show Tonight", "Interlude", "Touch Down", "Crank tha Bass", "LOL", and "Dreaming Now"), five bilingual ("Winner Girls", "Imagine", "Lalalalala", "On Your Side", and "U Know"), and two Japanese tracks ("Koishikute", and "Go to the Top").) (Note: Despite the nine English tracks being identified as English songs, each of those songs include minor words in Japanese. This is similar to "Go to the Top", which includes minor English language. However, because the tracks overemphasize their respective languages in the lyric sheet provided by Rhythm Zone, Avex Trax, and Avex Taiwan, they are identified as their respective language tracks.) Each song from the album is co-written by Koda, including the English, Japanese and interlude tracks. The album includes two interlude tracks; "Introduction: Bon Voyage" and "Interlude: Bon Voyage", both boasting electronic music and sirens noises. EDM elements are used in tracks "Show Me Your Holla", "Crank tha Bass" (featuring OVDS), "LOL", "Go to the Top", "Dreaming On", and "U Know". "Loaded", which features Jamaican rapper and musician Sean Paul, incorporates elements of reggae and dancehall music, as does the following tracks "Winner Girls" and "On Your Side". Tetsuo Hiraga from Hot Shot Discs reviewed the singles "Go to the Top" and "Koishikute", and identified musical elements of electronic dance, dubstep, and 8-bit music in the former, and a pop ballad melody in the latter. Koda's summer EP Summer Trip featured "Lalalalala" and "Touch Down", and Hiraga noted elements of country rock in the former, and R&B in the latter track.

== Release and packaging ==
Bon Voyage was released on February 26, 2014, by Rhythm Zone and Avex Taiwan in five different formats. The stand-alone CD featured the sixteen tracks in a cardboard slipcase, with first press editions including a glossy sticker of Koda. The CD and DVD bundle featured the sixteen tracks and a bonus DVD, including the music videos for: "Show Me Your Holla", "LOL", "Dreaming Now!", "Touch Down", "Lalalalala", and "Koishikute". The DVD also included the making videos for "Show Me Your Holla" and "LOL". The CD and Blu-ray bundle includes the same tracks and videos from the CD and DVD bundle, but features a hologram sticker, one postercard, and a slipcase. A special edition was released on Koda's website, entitled the "Fan Club Edition". This format features the original CD, and a DVD featuring live performances from Koda's Fanclub Live Tour in 2013. The format was housed in an A5-sized digipak. The final format is the digital release, which was released only in Japan. This is Koda's only studio album not to be released worldwide.

Visually based on cruise ship members, the five Bon Voyage cover sleeves feature different images all photographed by Kazuyoshi Shimomura. The CD cardboard sleeve has Koda squatting and holding onto a cruise ship steering wheel; the jewel case has Koda holding a life buoy. The CD and DVD cardboard sleeve has a close-up shot of Koda wearing a captain's uniform; the jewel case has Koda posing on top of a life buoy. The Blu-ray cardboard sleeve and jewel case has Koda posing with a pair of binoculars, while the Fan Club edition has a close-up of Koda sitting down holding a cruise ship steering wheel. The digital release uses the CD and DVD close-up shot. The booklet and photo shoot were designed by members of United Lounge Tokyo, and each booklet from the five format features different images of Koda.

== Critical reception ==
Professional ratings
Review scores
| Source | Rating |
|---|---|
| Japako Music | (positive) |
| JPopJRocks.com | B− |

Bon Voyage received favourable reviews from music critics. Japako Music's Kirsty H. gave the album a positive review, saying that it "shows Koda Kumi's experiences perfectly". Kirsty praised Koda's "personal songs" and the album's musical variation. On the album's overall sound, she wrote the following: "The album overall is very good and catchy and clearly shows how mature and experienced Koda Kumi is. All of the songs are catchy and this makes the album all the more fun to listen to”. Jaylee and Zero from GK:AD, a sub-site from JPopJRocks.com, awarded the album a B−, calling the dance tracks gems and praising a majority of the album's ballads. Zero highlighted "Imagine" as the album's best track. However, they both were critical toward the composition of the second half of the album.

== Commercial performance ==
Bon Voyage debuted at number one on both the Japanese Daily and Weekly Oricon Albums Chart, with over 46,000 units sold in its first week. It became Koda's sixth studio album to reach the top spot, but became her lowest first week sales since her debut album Affection (2002). It fell to 21 in its second week, shifting over 5,000 units. The album stayed in the top 100 for four weeks, and the overall top 300 for twelve weeks. As of January 2016, Bon Voyage has sold an estimated 59,499 units, making it her first album to not sell over the 100,000 limit. Because of this, it failed to achieve a certification by the Recording Industry Association of Japan (RIAJ). It was her lowest selling studio album at the time, until her next album Walk Of My Life sold less by May 2015 (with 50,000 units). Bon Voyage reached number five on Japan's Billboard Top Albums Sales.

== Promotion ==
=== Singles ===
"Go to the Top" was released as the album's lead single on October 24, 2012. The song was used as the opening theme song for the Âge–developed anime series Muv-Luv Alternative: Total Eclipse. Upon its release, it garnered positive reviews from music critics. Many critics commended the song's composition, lyrical content, and Koda's vocal delivery. Minor criticism was towards the song's musical elements of 8-bit music. "Go to the Top" was successful in Japan, peaking at number one on the Japanese Oricon Singles Chart, Koda's eighth number one single. It also reached number 10 on Billboard's Japan Hot 100 chart, and was certified gold by the Recording Industry Association of Japan (RIAJ) for physical shipments of 100,000 units. The accompanying music video for the single was shot in Tokyo by Tomoe Nakano; it features an animated Koda flying a large robot in a racing circuit with another racer.

The music video for "Lalalalala" was shot at the Venice Beach Boardwalk (pictured above) in Venice, California. This is Koda's first music video shot in the United States.

"Koishikute" was released as the album's second single on December 26, 2012. Upon its release, it garnered positive reviews from music critics. Many critics commended the song's composition, lyrical content, and Koda's vocal delivery; critics had highlighted it as an album stand out, and labelled it a "gem". The single suffered in physical sales in Japan, reaching number seven on the Japanese Oricon Singles Chart and selling over 23,000 units. It remains Koda's lowest selling single since "Hot Stuff" in 2005. However, the song was certified gold by RIAJ for digital sales of 100,000 units. The accompanying music video for the single was shot in Tokyo by Ryuji Seki; it features Koda singing the song in a subway and in a small room.

Summer Trip was released as the album's third single and first extended play single on July 31, 2013. The EP consists of four interlude tracks, two album tracks: "Lalalalala" and "Touch Down", and an unreleased track "Is This Trap?". Upon its release, Summer Trip received garnered positive reviews from music critics. Many critics commended the tracks individually for its composition and its song writing. Summer Trip debuted at number six on the Japanese Singles Chart, and sold over 20,000 units. "Lalalalala" charted on Japan's Hot 100 at number 23. This is Koda's lowest selling EP to date, surpassing Gossip Candy (2010) which sold over 84,000 units. Music videos for "Lalalalala" and "Touch Down" were shot in Venice Beach, California.

"Dreaming Now!" was released as the album's fourth and final single on November 13, 2013, which was the same day as Koda's 30th birthday. The song was written by Koda in honor of Japan's part in the 2013 Volleyball World Grand Champion Cup for men and women, both of which were held in Japan. Upon its release, it garnered positive reviews from music critics. Many critics commended the tracks composition and labelled it an anthem for the games. Despite out selling both "Koishikute" and Summer Trip with over 26,000 units sold, it charted lower on the Japanese Oricon Singles Chart at number nine. It charted at number 33 on Japan's Hot 100 chart. An accompanying music video for "Dreaming Now!" was shot in Tokyo.

=== Concert tour ===
To promote Bon Voyage, Koda went on her 2014 Bon Voyage concert tour. The concert tour went throughout Japan, and carried on the cruise theme from the album. All of the album tracks, apart from "On Your Side" and "Introduction: Bon Voyage", were included on the set list for the tour; "Is This Trap?" from Summer Trip also appeared on the set list. The concert tour was released in two formats; a double-DVD bundle, and a Blu-ray release. The bonus disc on the DVD bundle featured a new track "Money in my Bag" from Walk of My Life, alongside the backdrop visual of "Crank tha Bass" and the documentary of the tour. This material was included on the one disc for Blu-ray. Despite the release, it did not chart on the Oricon DVD and Blu-ray charts. To promote the material from Bon Voyage, remixes of "Crank tha Bass", "Loaded", "Is This Trap?", "Dreaming Now!", "Touch Down", "Winner Girls", and "Lalalalala" were later featured on Koda's eight remix album Koda Kumi Driving Hit's 6 (2014).

== Track listing ==
CD only.
| No. | Title | Lyrics | Music | Producer(s) | Length |
|---|---|---|---|---|---|
| 1. | "Introduction: Bon Voyage" | Koda Kumi | Joseph Lawrence | Lawrence | 1:30 |
| 2. | "Show Me Your Holla" | Koda; Miriam Nervo; Olivia Nervo | T-SK; Nervo; Nervo; Kim Taesung | Toby Gad | 3:08 |
| 3. | "Loaded feat. Sean Paul" | Koda; Arama Brown; Gad; Paul | Gad | Gad | 4:17 |
| 4. | "Winner Girls" | Koda Kumi; Albi Albertsson; Yuka Otsuki | Mussashi | Mussashi | 3:21 |
| 5. | "Imagine" | Koda Kumi | Fast Lane; Mat Lie Skare | Lie Skare | 4:14 |
| 6. | "Koishikute" | Koda Kumi | Jam9; M.I. | Masaki Iehara | 5:11 |
| 7. | "LALALALALA" | Koda | Figge Brostrom; Anna Engh | Figge | 3:37 |
| 8. | "Let's Show Tonight" | Koda; Sonomi Tameoka | UTA | UTA | 1:21 |
| 9. | "Interlude: Bon Voyage" | Koda | Joseph Lawrence | Will Simms | 1:12 |
| 10. | "Touch Down" | Koda; Gad; Joanna Levesque | Gad | Gad | 3:44 |
| 11. | "Crank Tha Bass feat. OVDS" | Koda; Kalis | Tommy Henriksen; Chioma Eze | Henriksen | 3:15 |
| 12. | "LOL" | Koda; Ronny Svendsen; Anne Judith Wik; Nermin Harambasic; Bardur Haberg | Ronny Svendsen; Anne Judith Wik; Nermin Harambasic; Bardur Haberg | Dsign Music; Haberg | 3:28 |
| 13. | "Go to the top" | Koda | Clarabell | Clarabell | 3:49 |
| 14. | "Dreaming Now!" | Koda | Mitsu. J | Mitsu. J | 4:18 |
| 15. | "On Your Side" | Mocha | Kipp Williams; Kyle Shearer | Kipp Williams; Kyle Shearer | 2:59 |
| 16. | "U Know" | Koda; Bruno Lopez; Loi Albringer; Martin Wiik; Glen Eriksson | Loi Albringer; Martin Wiik; Glen Eriksson | Reflection Music | 3:24 |

DVD/Blu-Ray
| No. | Title | Length |
|---|---|---|
| 1. | "Show Me Your Holla" (Music Video) |
| 2. | "LOL" (Music Video) |
| 3. | "Go to the top" (Music Video) |
| 4. | "Koishikute" (Music Video) |
| 5. | "LALALALALA" (Music Video) |
| 6. | "Touch Down" (Music Video) |
| 7. | "Dreaming Now!" (Music Video) |
| 8. | "Show Me Your Holla" (Making Video) |
| 9. | "LOL" (Making Video) |

Limited FanClub DVD - Koda Kumi Fanclub Live Tour: Let's Party Vol. 2
| No. | Title | Length |
|---|---|---|
| 1. | "Lay Down" |
| 2. | "Universe" |
| 3. | "Ecstasy" |
| 4. | "Candy" |
| 5. | "Hot Stuff" |
| 6. | "Gentle Words" |
| 7. | "You" |
| 8. | "Rain" |
| 9. | "You're So Beautiful" |
| 10. | "One" |
| 11. | "Medley: Can We Go Back/Pop Diva/Hey Baby!/Whatchu Waitin' On?" |
| 12. | "Dreaming Now!" |
| 13. | "Bring It On" |
| 14. | "Good Day" |
| 15. | "Making of "Let's Party Vol. 2"" |
| Total length: | | 90:00 |

== Personnel ==
Credits adapted from the liner notes of Bon Voyage.

- Koda Kumi – vocals, background vocals, songwriting
- Joseph Lawrence – composer, producer
- Toby Gad – composer, producer
- Miriam Nervo – composer, songwriting
- Olivia Nervo – composer, songwriting
- T-SK – composer
- Kim Taesung – composer, songwriting
- Arama Brown – composer, songwriting
- Albi Albertsson – composer, songwriting
- Yuka Otsuki – songwriting
- Mussashi – composer, producer
- Fast Lane – composer
- Mat Lie Skare – composer, producer
- Jam9 – composer
- M.I. – composer
- Masaki Iehara – producer
- Figge Brostrom – composer, producer
- Anna Engh – composer, producer
- Sonomi Tameoka – songwriting
- UTA – composer, producer
- Will Simms – producer
- Joanna Levesque – songwriting
- Kalis – songwriting, background vocals
- Tommy Henriksen – composer, producer
- Chioma Eze – composer
- Dsign Music – composer(s), producer(s)
- Bardur Haberg – composer, producer
- Clarabell – composer, producer
- Mitsu. J – composer, producer
- Kipp Williams – composer, producer
- Kyle Shearer – composer, producer
- Mocha – songwriting
- Bruno Lopez – songwriting
- Lo Albringer – songwriting, composer, producer
- Martin Wiik – songwriting, composer, producer
- Glen Eriksson – songwriting, composer, producer
- Reflection Music – producer(s)
- Sean Paul – songwriting, guest vocals, background vocals
- OVDS – guest vocals, background vocals
- Rhythm Zone - management, label
- Avex Trax - parent label, management

== Charts ==
=== Weekly charts ===
Weekly charts for Bon Voyage
| Chart (2014) | Peak position |
|---|---|
| Japanese Albums (Oricon) | 1 |
| Japanese Top Albums (Billboard) | 5 |

=== Monthly charts ===
Monthly charts for Bon Voyage
| Chart (2014) | Peak position |
|---|---|
| Japanese Albums (Oricon) | 5 |

== Sales ==
Sales for Bon Voyage
| Region | Certification | Certified units/sales |
|---|---|---|
| Japan | — | 59,499 |

== Alternate Versions ==
Crank Tha Bass feat. OVDS

1. Crank Tha Bass feat. OVDS: Found on the album (2014)
2. Crank Tha Bass feat. OVDS [sumijun vs M.A.D Remix]: Found on Koda Kumi Driving Hit's 6 (2014)
3. Crank Tha Bass feat. OVDS [OVDS Remix] : Found on Koda Kumi Driving Hit's 6 (2014)

LOADED feat. Sean Paul

1. LOADED feat. Sean Paul: Found on the album (2014)
2. LOADED feat. Sean Paul [ELMER VoVo Remix]: Found on Koda Kumi Driving Hit's 6 (2014)

Winner Girls

1. Winner Girls: Found on the album (2014)
2. Winner Girls [Dank-One Glitch-Hop Remix]: Found on Koda Kumi Driving Hit's 6 (2014)
