= Feel... =

Video by Koda Kumi
- Released: 24 March 2004
- Recorded: 2004
- Genres: Pop, R&B, J-pop, dance-pop
- Labels: Rhythm Zone, (RZBD-45120)
- Producer: Koda Kumi

Koda Kumi chronology
7 Spirits (2003)	Feel... (2004)	Girls: Selfish (2004)

Feel... (stylized as feel...) is the second compilation DVD from Japanese star Koda Kumi. As of 2010, the DVD has sold 32,591 copies. The DVD was released to coincide with the release of her third studio album, Feel My Mind.

The music videos placed on the DVD were the a-sides released during the era of feel my mind.

Other features on the DVD included commercials for the singles released during the feel my mind era, pictures exclusive to the DVD and an interview with Kumi.

== Information ==
feel... is the second compilation DVD by Japanese R&B-turned-pop singer-songwriter Kumi Koda. Unlike her first DVD, 7 Spirits, feel... failed to chart on Oricon. As of 2010, feel... has sold 32,591 copies.

The DVD was released the same day as her third studio album, feel my mind, and included all of the music videos released between that album and her previous album, Grow into One.

feel... not only contained the music videos, but also contained the behind-the-scene making videos of each video, along with the television commercials and promotional images. The promotional images were exclusive to the DVD.

== Music videos ==
The DVD carried the three music videos released to the public during the singles' promotional runs.

"Come With Me" was set at night during a party on a beach in Thailand. The speaking parts in the music video are subtitled in Japanese. The video shows Kumi partying under a cabana, along with scenes of her on the beach during the sunrise.

"Gentle Words" is a soft and sensual video, which shows Kumi longing for a loved one. Kumi donned a more mature look for the video, showing that of elegance. The ending was hinted to lead into her later video "Kiseki."

"Crazy 4 U" was set in Tokyo and carried an espionage theme, having Kumi in several incarnations. The main storyline was of an incarnation as a spy trying to track down a smuggler. Throughout the video, all of the incarnations manage to interact with each other, including a party girl who unwittingly got involved.

"Crazy 4 U" became the music video with the style Kumi would become most comfortable with throughout her career. It kick-started her ero-kawaii style, which would later become popular throughout Japan's high school community with her release of Butterfly.

== Track listing ==
(Official track listing)

=== DVD ===
1. "Come With Me"
2. "Gentle Words"
3. "Crazy 4 U"
4. Special Interview
5. Bonus Pictures
6. "TV-CM"
