= Summer of Love (album) =

Greatest hits album by Koda Kumi
- Released: July 22, 2015
- Recorded: 2005–2015
- Genres: Pop; dance; R&B
- Label: Rhythm Zone
- Producer: Koda Kumi

Koda Kumi chronology
Walk of My Life (2015)	Summer of Love (2015)	Winter of Love (2016)

Summer of Love (stylized as SUMMER of LOVE) is the sixth greatest hits album by Japanese singer-songwriter Koda Kumi, released on July 22, 2015 through Rhythm Zone. It follows her five previous greatest hits albums, Best: First Things (2005), Best: Second Session (2006), Best: Bounce & Lovers (2007), Out Works & Collaboration Best (2009), and Best: Third Universe/Universe (2010). The compilation was released in many different formats including a one-disc standard edition, and a two-disc CD and DVD package. The album includes three new tracks; "Ex Tape", the album's lead promotional single, "Hurricane", and "No One Else but You".

Summer of Love was appreciated by contemporary critics who noted the vast production of Koda's collection. The album debuted at number seven on the Japanese Oricon Albums Chart, making it her fifth top ten album, but became her lowest selling compilation album to date. Summer of Love is also Koda's first compilation to miss the chart in Taiwan. "Ex Tape" was released as a promotional single, but failed to chart in any Japanese music charts.

== Background and material ==
On May 22, 2015, Koda announced on her official Facebook account that she had started producing and "recording new music". Koda teased the album's title with the hashtag, #SummerofLove15, and confirmed on May 30 the release of the album. The album artwork was photographed by Japanese team Tisch, and designed by Jun Hirota; according to Thomas Swan from Classicalite.com, the artwork "shows a glowing, sophisticated Koda – a grown-up girl who has toned down the erokawa a bit for a more refined look, but with no less impact than she is known for."

Summer of Love compiles "summer singles" that span from her 2006 studio album, Black Cherry, up until her 2015 studio album, Walk of My Life. It features three new tracks; "Ex Tape" and "Hurricane", which are upbeat "urban songs," and "No One Else but You", which is inspired by "smoother, jazzier" music. Two songs, "Niygohime" and "Juicy", were included on the televised commercial for Summer of Love, but the songs were pulled from the compilation at the last minute. Summer of Love has a variety different music genres and musical styles; songs like "Lick Me", "Lady Go", and "Freaky" emphasize dance-pop and electronic music. Tetsuo Hiraga from Hot Express stated that songs like "I'll Be There" is a "classic summer song", while songs like "Freaky" and "Girls" were inspired by rock, R&B, and pop music. "Lady Go" and "Once Again" were noted for its summery "festival" vibe. "Lollipop" was noted for its Hip-hop elements, but Hiraga commented that the Japanese public would "shy away" from the Westernized hip-hop sound.

== Promotion ==
"Ex Tape" was released as the album's only promotional single on July 8, 2015; the single premiered on Mu-mo websites, and was available for free streaming on iTunes Stores. Despite its release, the song failed to chart in any Japanese or Taiwanese music charts. An accompanying music video was released for the song, which was included on the DVD version of Summer of Love. "No One Else but You" was released on Japanese radio stations on July 14, and uploaded on Koda's YouTube channel the same day. Koda co-promoted the album alongside Walk of My Life on her Koda Kumi Live Tour: Walk of My Life, performing the three new tracks. She performed the songs in Miyagi, and whoever attended that night received a reserved copy of Summer of Love, and goodies.

== Track listing ==
No.	Title	Lyrics	Music	arrangement	Length
1.	"EX TAPE"	Koda Kumi	D.O.I	Unik; Katerina Bramley	3:12
2.	"HURRICANE"	Koda Kumi	D.O.I; Sky Adams	Sky Adams; Kanata Okajima; Maegan Cottone	3:58
3.	"NO ONE ELSE BUT YOU"	Koda Kumi	D.O.I	UTA; Erik Petterson; Angelica Ahman	3:54
4.	"I'll be there"	Koda Kumi	Shintaro Hagiwara	tasuku	4:13
5.	"With your smile"	Koda Kumi	Tohru Watanabe	h-wonder	4:13
6.	"FREAKY"	Koda Kumi	Tommy Henriksen	Tommy Henriksen	3:19
7.	"girls"	Koda Kumi	Kosuke Morimoto	h-wonder	4:38
8.	"Lick me♥"	Koda Kumi	YOO	Hiroto Suzuki	3:30
9.	"Once Again"	Pushim	Pushim; Shunya Mori	Shunya Mori	4:37
10.	"Lady Go!"	Koda Kumi	Kousuke Morimoto	Yusuke Tanaka	4:53
11.	"Lollipop"	Koda Kumi	Ian Curnow; Julie Morrision	Jane Vaughan	3:22
12.	"Poppin' love cocktail feat. TEEDA"	Koda Kumi; TEEDA	Back-On	Back-On & Jin	5:02
13.	"V.I.P"	Koda Kumi	Toby Gad; Jessie J	Toby Gad	3:06
14.	"LALALALALA"	Koda Kumi	Figge Boström; Anna Engh	Shinjiroh Inoue	3:37
15.	"TOUCH DOWN"	Koda Kumi; Toby Gad	Toby Gad	Toby Gad	3:45
16.	"HOTEL"	Koda Kumi	H.U.B; Didrik Thott; Sebastian Thott; Ylva Dimberg	Naoki Yamada	3:21

DVD

No.	Title	director(s)	Length
1.	"EX TAPE" (Music Video)	YKBX
2.	"HURRICANE" (Music Video)	YKBX
3.	"I'll be there" (Music Video)	Shigeaki Kubo
4.	"Ningyo-Hime" (Music Video)	Tadashi Tadakoro
5.	"JUICY" (Music Video)	Shigeaki Kubo
6.	"FREAKY" (Music Video)	Takashi Tadokoro
7.	"Run For Your Life" (Music Video)	Shigeaki Kubo
8.	"Lick me♥" (Music Video)	Shigeaki Kubo
9.	"Hashire!" (Music Video)	Seki ☆ Ryuuji
10.	"That Ain't Cool feat. Fergie" (Music Video)	Fatima Robinson
11.	"Lollipop" (Music Video)	Seki ☆ Ryuuji
12.	"Poppin' love cocktail feat. TEEDA" (Music Video)	Hiroaki Higashi
13.	"V.I.P" (Music Video)	Hiroaki Higashi
14.	"LALALALALA" (Music Video)	Fatima Robinson
15.	"TOUCH DOWN" (Music Video)	Fatima Robinson
16.	"HOTEL" (Music Video)	Kanji Sudo
17.	"EX TAPE/HURRICANE" (Making Video)	YKBX

== Charts ==
Chart (2015)	Peak position
Japan Weekly (Oricon)	7

== Certifications ==
Region	Certification	Certified units/sales
Japan	—	23,000
