= Kiseki =

Kiseki (奇跡) is the Japanese word for miracle. It may also refer to:

== Songs ==
- "Kiseki" (BeForU song)
- "Kiseki" (BoA song)
- "Kiseki" (Greeeen song)
- "Kiseki" (Kumi Koda song)

== Other ==
- Kiseki (film), a Japanese film
- Kiseki (Shugo Chara!), a character in the manga series Shugo Chara!
- Kiseki Films, a former anime company
- Kiseki, known as Trails outside of Japan, a video game franchise
- Kiseki, a Japanese thoroughbred racehorse
