= Koda Kumi Driving Hit's 7 =

Remix album by Koda Kumi
- Released: April 5, 2017
- Recorded: 2004–2017 (vocals), 2017 (melodies)
- Genre: Drum and bass; dubstep; house
- Label: Rhythm Zone

Koda Kumi chronology
W Face (2017)	Koda Kumi Driving Hit's 7 (2017)	AND (2018)

Koda Kumi Driving Hit's 7 is the ninth remix album by Japanese singer-songwriter Koda Kumi. The album was released April 5, 2017. It debuted in the top ten on the Oricon Albums Charts at number 9.

Keeping instep with her prior Driving Hit's albums, the remixes were performed in drum and bass and house style. The album also became her first remix album to not have a "Sunset in Ibiza" remix for a song, whereas House Nation did not take part in the album's production.

The album was released a month after her studio album W Face, and harbored remixes of some of the songs from W Face ~outside~. Remixes on the album also included "Cutie Honey", "Koi no Tsubomi" and "Ai no Uta", among others.

== Track listing ==
=== CD ===
1. "W FACE" (Lazy Rich Remix)
2. "Money in My Bag" (Starfvckers Remix)
3. "Insane" (Perk Pietrek Remix)
4. "Ultraviolet" (Yamato & DMD Remix)
5. "Cupcake" feat. AKLO (Retrohandz Remix)
6. "Wicked Girls" (Daddy's Groove Remix)
7. "Hotel" (Plastik Funk Remix)
8. "Ai no Uta" (JAXX DA FISHWORKS Remix)
9. "Koi no Tsubomi" (JAXX DA FISHWORKS Remix)
10. "Damn real" (NINESTATESFLEX Remix)
11. "Cutie Honey" (JAXX DA FISHWORKS Remix)
12. "Shhh!" (TEXTOR Remix)
13. "Dance in the Rain" (TEXTOR Remix)
14. "Lippy" (FIGHT CLVB Remix)
15. "Bassline" (Flatdisk Remix)

== Charts ==
Chart (2017)	Peak position
Japanese Oricon Daily Albums Chart	9
