= 奇蹟 =

奇蹟, 奇迹, 奇跡 or 기적 (奇蹟) is East Asian character for a word or morpheme literally miracle.

It may refer to:

Chinese written as 奇蹟 or 奇迹

- Making Miracles, a 2007 Singaporean TV series
- Miracles (1989 film), a Hong Kong film
- Miracle, a Hong Kong album by FAMA released in October 2010
- Miracle, a Hong Kong album by Wallace Chung released in June 1996
- Miracle, a Taiwanese album by Valen Hsu released in October 2014
- Nice View (film), a 2022 Chinese film

Japanese written as 奇跡

- Kiseki (Greeeen song)
- Kiseki (Koda Kumi song)
- I Wish (film)
- 奇跡 ("Miracle"), a 2011 Japanese single by Quruli

Korean written as 기적

- Eternity (VIXX song)
- "Gijeog" (Miracle), a 2009 South Korean single in the album On the Way Home OST by Han Seung-yeon
- Miracle, a 2006 Korean television series starring Jang Yong and Park Won-sook
- Miracle, a 2018 Korean extended play by Golden Child (band)
- Miracle: Letters to the President
