= Koda Kumi Driving Hit's 5 =

Remix album by Koda Kumi
- Released: March 20, 2013
- Recorded: 2000–2013 (vocals) 2012–2013 (melodies)
- Genre: Drum and bass; dubstep; house
- Label: Rhythm Zone

Koda Kumi chronology
Color the Cover (2013)	Koda Kumi Driving Hit's 5 (2013)	Bon Voyage (2014)

Koda Kumi Driving Hit's 5 is the seventh remix album by Japanese singer-songwriter Koda Kumi. It was released on March 20, 2013, the same day as her live DVD/Blu-ray Premium Night: Love & Songs and six rental live albums. Following the trend from Koda Kumi Driving Hit's 4, this album contains remixes kept in drum and bass and dubstep style, as well as house remixes. It is the first of her remix albums to have an introduction and a megamix made of remixes from her previous Driving Hit's albums.

It became her lowest charted remix album, barely breaking the top twenty at No. 19 on Oricon, however, it remained on the charts for six weeks.

== Track listing ==
Track list

1. "Introduction for DH5"
2. "Go to the top" (DJAKi ASY Remix)
  53rd single Go to the Top
3. "No Man's Land" (4 Skips D'n'B Remix)
4. "Ningyo-hime" (N15H vs. HEAVENS WiRE D'n'B Remix)
5. "real Emotion" (KOZM Remix)
6. "Someday" (Big Boy Remix)
7. "show girl" (DJ E-Man Big Show Remix)
8. "Take Back" (E-Man "106" Remix)
9. "Driving Hit's Best Mega Mix"
  - "Moon Crying" (GTS SH Club Mix)
  - "TABOO" (HOUSE NATION Sunset in Ibiza Remix)
  - "Cutie Honey" (MITOMI TOKOTO Big Room Remix)
  - "Driving" (GROOVE HACKER$ Remix)
  - "Lady Go!"
  - "POP DIVA" (HOUSE NATION Sunset in Ibiza Remix)
  - "Teaser feat. Clench & Blistah" (Caramel Pod Dubstep Remix)
  - "Poppin' love cocktail feat. TEEDA" (TeddyLoid Remix)
10. "Shake Hip!" (John Fontein (RE:LABEL®) Remix)
11. "AT THE WEEKEND" (Big Boy LA Weekend Remix)
12. "Let's Party" (KOZM Remix)
13. "Koishikute" (Dirt $outh (RE:LABEL®) Remix)
14. "Alone" (Prog5 Classic Remix)
15. "One more time, One more chance" (Shohei Matsumoto & Junichi Matsuda Remix)
16. "Ai no Kotoba" (AILI's Warmy Remix)

== Oricon Sales Chart (Japan) ==
Release	Chart	Daily position	Debut sales	Sales total
March 20, 2013	Oricon Daily Charts	6		9,554
March 20, 2013	Weekly Chart	19	6,850	9,554
