= 15th Anniversary Best Live History DVD Book =

Video by Koda Kumi
- Released: March 26, 2015
- Recorded: 2005–2015
- Genre: Pop, R&B
- Length: 1:04:07
- Label: Rhythm Zone; ISBN 978-4800239969
- Producer: Akihiro Kubo

Koda Kumi chronology
Hall Tour 2014: Bon Voyage (2014)	15th Anniversary Best Live History DVD Book (2015)	Live Tour 2015: Walk of My Life (2015)

15th Anniversary Best Live History DVD Book (stylized as 15th Anniversary BEST LIVE HISTORY DVD BOOK) is the first compilation DVD book released by Japanese R&B-turned-pop singer Koda Kumi. The DVD book ranked No. 1 on the Rakuten Books Weekly Ranking in the pop/rock division.

The DVD book was available nationwide in bookstores and convenience stores.

== Information ==
15th Anniversary Best Live History DVD Book is the first compilation DVD book released by Japanese singer-songwriter Koda Kumi on March 26, 2015 and published by Takarajimasha. Due to the compilation being advertised as a DVD book and not a standard DVD, it did not chart on Oricon and was given the ISBN of 978-4800239969. Instead, the DVD book ranked No. 1 on the Rakuten Books Weekly Ranking in the pop/rock division.

The DVD book was available in bookstores, convenience stores and EC sites nationwide.

While being released a year prior to her 15th Anniversary LIVE The Artist DVD, both had their cover art taken at the same times, with Koda Kumi on the same set in the same ensemble, with only slightly different poses. The art direction was very similar to that of her twelfth studio album, Walk of My Life, which had been released a week prior on March 18.

The footage interviewed several people who have worked with Kumi. They would tell their favorite dances, stage setups, backstage moments, working with Kumi, and then a short clip of whichever performance was shown. Those featured were dancers SHUN, OOBA, KAICHOU, U★G and MINAMI, stage director MASAO, stage set coordinator Hideyuki Ohtomo, camera operator Yoshio Muroi, visual crew member Masataka Watanabe, lighting designer Tetsuya Takahashi, manipulator Mikio Mogami, flying coordinator Satoru Inagaki, illumination designer Tosimitsu Kaihara and make-up artist Tomoyuki Onishi.

== Track listing ==
1. "Koda Kumi Live Selects 2005–2014: Part I"
  - "Interview with MASAO" (Total Staging Director)
  - "Interview with OOBA" (Dancer)
  - "Interview with Hideyuki Ohtomo" (Stage Set Coordinate)
  - "Interview with KAICHOU" (Dancer)
2. "From Here...Backstage Group Circle Collections!"
3. "After That...LIVE MC Treasure Collection"
4. "Live Selects: Part 2"
  - "Interview with Yoshio Muroi" (Live Camera Switcher)
  - "Interview with Masataka Watanabe" (Visual Crew)
  - "Interview with SHUN" (Dancer)
  - "Interview with Tetsuya Takahashi" (Lighting Designer)
  - "Interview with MASAO" (Total Staging Director)
  - "Interview with OOBA" (Dancer)
  - "Interview with SHUN" (Dancer)
  - "Interview with U★G" (Dancer)
  - "Interview with Tomoyuki Onishi" (Koda Kumi Make-Up)
  - "Interview with Mikio Mogami" (Manipulator)
  - "Interview with Tetsuya Takahashi" (Lighting Designer)
  - "Interview with Satoru Inagaki" (Flying)
  - "Interview with Tosimitsu Kaihara" (Illumination Designer)
  - "Interview with Masataka Watanabe" (Visual Crew)
5. "From Here...LIVE Costume Collection"
6. "Backstage After LIVE"
7. "Live Selects: Part 3"
  - "Interview with KAICHOU" (Dancer)
  - "Interview with U★G" (Dancer)
  - "Interview with Tomoyuki Onishi" (Koda Kumi Make-Up)
  - "Interview with MINAMI" (Dancer)
  - "Interview with Satoru Inagaki" (Flying)
  - "Interview with KAICHOU" (Dancer)
  - "Interview with sammy" (Guitar)
  - "Interview with SHUN" (Dancer)
  - "Interview with MASAO" (Total Staging Director)

== Charts (Japan) ==
Release	Chart	Peak position	Total sales
March 26, 2015	Rakuten Books Weekly	1	400,000
