= Violet (EP) =

EP by Pentagon
- Released: January 17, 2018
- Genre: J-pop
- Length: 22:45
- Language: Japanese
- Label: Cube Entertainment Japan
- Producer: ArmySlick; CuzD; Donna; Giz'Mo; IL; Jung Il-hoon; Kino; Kohei Yokono; Masaki Iehara; Nathan; Ricky; Yu-ki Kokubo

Pentagon chronology
Demo 02 (2017)	Violet (2018)	Positive (2018)

Pentagon Japanese chronology
Gorilla (2017)	Violet (2018)	Shine (2018)

Singles from Violet
- 1. "Violet (Japanese Version)" Released: January 17, 2018

Music video
- "Violet (Japanese ver.)" on YouTube

Violet is the second Japanese extended play by South Korean boy group Pentagon, released on January 17, 2018 by Cube Entertainment Japan. The EP contains Japanese-language versions of their previous songs, the title track "Violet" from Demo 02 and "Beautiful" from Ceremony, and four original songs.

== Background ==
On November 16, 2017, it was announced that Pentagon would release their second Japanese EP on January 17, 2018. The track list and physical album types were also revealed on the same day. The EP was released early on January 6, exclusively on the music streaming service Line Music.

== Commercial performance ==
The week of the release, Violet took the number 1 spot on all of Tower Records' weekly album charts, and ranked fourth on Oricon's weekly album chart. The EP ranked number 8 on Tower Records' highest-selling Japanese albums by Korean artists in 2018. Violet placed tenth on Oricon's annual Indie Albums rankings for 2018.

== Track listing ==
Violet track listing
No.	Title	Lyrics	Music	Arrangement	Length
1.	"Wake Up"	Giz'Mo	Masaki Iehara; Giz'Mo	Masaki Iehara	3:18
2.	"Burnin' Love"	Yu Shimoji; Giz'Mo	ArmySlick; Giz'Mo	ArmySlick	3:36
3.	"Violet" (Japanese version)	Kino; E'Dawn; Yuto; Wooseok; Yu Shimoji	Kino; Nathan	Nathan	3:55
4.	"Beautiful" (Japanese version)	Jung Il-hoon; IL; Risa Horie	Jung Il-hoon; IL	IL; Jung Il-hoon	3:43
5.	"Love"	Yu-ki Kokubo	Kohei Yokono; Yu-ki Kokubo	Kohei Yokono	4:17
6.	"Up! Up! Up!"	Samuelle Soung	Donna; Ricky; CuzD	Donna; Ricky; CuzD	3:56
Total length:					22:45

Type A (CD)
No.	Title	Length
1.	"Wake Up"
2.	"Burnin' Love"
3.	"Violet" (Japanese version)
4.	"Love"
5.	"Up! Up! Up!"

Type B (CD)
No.	Title	Length
1.	"Wake Up"
2.	"Burnin' Love"
3.	"Violet" (Japanese version)
4.	"Beautiful" (Japanese version)
5.	"Up! Up! Up!"

Type C (CD + DVD + Mini Photobook)
No.	Title	Length
1.	"Wake Up"
2.	"Burnin' Love"
3.	"Violet" (Japanese version)
4.	"Beautiful" (Japanese version)
5.	"Love"
6.	"Up! Up! Up!"

== Charts ==
Chart performance for Violet
Chart (2018)	Peak position
Japan Albums (Oricon)	4

== Sales ==
Sales for Violet
Region	Certification	Certified units/sales
Japan	—	21,918

== Release history ==
Release history and formats for Violet
Country	Date	Format	Label	Ref.
Japan	January 6, 2018	Streaming (Line Music exclusive)	Cube Entertainment Japan	
Japan	January 17, 2018	Digital download	Cube Entertainment Japan	
Various	January 17, 2018	CD	Cube Entertainment Japan	
