= Koda Kumi Driving Hit's 6 =

Remix album by Koda Kumi
- Released: March 19, 2014
- Recorded: 2005–2014 (vocals) 2013–2014 (melodies)
- Genre: Drum and bass; dubstep; house
- Label: Rhythm Zone

Koda Kumi chronology
Bon Voyage (2014)	Koda Kumi Driving Hit's 6 (2014)	Walk of My Life (2015)

Koda Kumi Driving Hit's 6 is the eighth remix album by Japanese singer-songwriter Koda Kumi. It was released on March 19, 2014 and came in at No. 19 on Oricon, only remaining on the charts for four weeks. As with her two previous Driving Hit's, the remixes were performed in drum and bass, dubstep and house.

It became her first Driving Hit's album to be released in a CD+DVD version (Beach Mix came in CD+DVD), with the DVD housing the documentary of her Taiwan Live 2013.

== Track listing ==
=== CD ===
1. "Introduction for DH6"
2. "XXX" [4 Skips vs. Floorbreaker EDM Remix]
3. "Crank Tha Bass feat. OVDS" [sumijun vs M.A.D Remix]
4. "Boom Boom Boys" [HEAVENS WiRE D'n'B Remix]
5. "Inside Fishbowl & Outside Fishbowl" [Sunset in Ibiza Dubstep Remix]
6. "Lady Go!" [DJ KOMORI Remix]
7. "girls" [TAKAROT"TOKYO FANTASTIC"Remix]
8. "LOADED feat. Sean Paul" [ELMER VoVo Remix]
9. "IS THIS TRAP?" [Jumping Dog Remix]
10. "Dreaming Now!" [TJO & YUSUKE from BLU-SWING Remix]
11. "ESCALATE" [Vesterbak's Fly-Me-To-Tokyo Remix]
12. "TOUCH DOWN" [736 Remix]
13. "Winner Girls" [Dank-One Glitch-Hop Remix]
14. "LALALALALA" [ELMER VoVo Remix]
15. Promise [ELMER VoVo Remix]
16. "Whatchu Waitin' On?" [Sham-Poo Beach Breeze Mix]
17. "Crank Tha Bass feat. OVDS" [OVDS Remix] (Bonus Track)

=== DVD ===
1. "Documentary Movie 「Koda Kumi Taiwan Live 2013」"

== Oricon Sales Chart (Japan) ==
Release	Chart	Peak position	Debut sales	Sales total
	Oricon Daily Charts	10	6,854	8,543
	Weekly Chart	19	7,846	8,543
