= Go to the Top (song) =

- CD only artwork.

Single by Koda Kumi

from the album Bon Voyage
- B-side: "Darling"
- Released: October 24, 2012
- Genre: Electronic dance
- Length: 3:47
- Label: Rhythm Zone
- Songwriter: Koda Kumi
- Producer: Clarabell

Koda Kumi singles chronology
| "Love Romance" (2012) | "Go to the Top" (2012) | "Koishikute" (2012) |

Music video
- "Go to the Top" on YouTube

"Go to the Top" (stylized as Go to the top) is a song recorded by Japanese recording artist Koda Kumi for her eleventh studio album, Bon Voyage (2012). It premiered on October 24, 2012 as the lead single from the album. The song was written by Kumi, while production was handled by Clarabell. It was used as the opening theme song for the Âge–developed anime series Muv-Luv Alternative: Total Eclipse. Musically, the track was described as an electronic dance song with elements of 8-bit music, dance-pop, and dubstep.

Upon its release, "Go to the Top" garnered positive reviews from music critics. Many critics commended the song's dance-influenced composition, lyrical content, and Kumi's vocal delivery. Minor criticism was towards the song's inclusion of 8-bit music elements. The song was successful in Japan, peaking at #1 on the Japanese Oricon Singles Chart and becoming Kumi's eighth number one single. It also reached 10 on Billboard's Japan Hot 100 chart, and was certified gold by the Recording Industry Association of Japan (RIAJ) for physical shipments of 100,000 units.

The accompanying music video for "Go to the Top" was shot in Tokyo by Tomoe Nakano; it features an animated Kumi flying a large robot in a racing circuit with another racer. Koda performed the single during several of her concerts, including Premium Night: Love & Songs and the Hall Tour 2014: Bon Voyage.

== Background ==
"Go to the Top" was Kumi's first single since her promotional recording "Whatchu Waitin' On?" from her sixth remix album Beach Mix, and giving birth to her and Kenji's son in July 2012. On June 30, Koda Kumi's record label Rhythm Zone confirmed that she was to perform the theme song for the Âge–developed anime series Muv-Luv Alternative: Total Eclipse. The song was Kumi's seventh collaboration effort with anime series; the previous six songs being "Real Emotion" and "1000 Words" for the 2003 video game Final Fantasy X-2, "Go Way" for the 2006 film Crayon Shin-chan: Densetsu o Yobu Odore! Amigo!. Koda also performed the theme songs the live-action film of the anime series; the title track for Cutie Honey, "Crazy 4 U" for Gilgamesh, "No Regret" for The Law of Ueki, and the title track for Re: Cutie Honey.

It was selected as the lead single from Bon Voyage and was released in Japan on October 24, 2012 by Rhythm Zone. The Maxi CD version of the single contains the B-side "Darling", and the DJ AKI and Takeo Yatabe remix for "Go to the Top". The DVD version of the single contains the accompanying music video, and a limited "Total Eclipse Edition" with Slipcase includes all tracks and the video except "Darling". There are four cover sleeves to "Go to the Top". The CD, DVD, and Fan Club formats feature close-up shots of Kumi wearing a bejewelled masquerade mask. Red construction tape superimposes her, with Kumi's and the song's title inserted in it. The Total Eclipse Edition features a shot of Total Eclipse character Takamura Yui. The digital single uses the original DVD cover.

== Composition ==
"Go to the Top" was written by Kumi, while production was handled by Clarabell. Clarabell was in charge of the song's arrangement and production, including the synthesizers, keyboards, and drum machine. Kiyoto Konda played the electric guitar during the chorus and song breaks. The song was described as an electronic dance song that, according to Patrick St. Michel from The Japan Times, "featured elements of contemporary stateside electronic dance music (EDM)." The song was noted for its numerous musical elements including 8-bit music, dance-pop, and dubstep. Koda said that she had become "languish[ed]" after having "life-changing events such as marriage and having a baby,". She felt the effects left her "not knowing what direction I was going to take," in terms of her musical sound and lyrical delivery.

== Critical reception ==
"Go to the Top" received mostly positive reviews from music critics. Vixen Ninetails from Comic Buzz stated that the song was the reason she loved the episodes, particularly the first two. Ninetails said that the song was "worth listening to". Julie from the website GoBoiano.com listed Koda as their Music Spotlight Artist of the Week, and listed "Go to the Top" as her third most essential career track. The other five were, in order: "Juicy", "Taboo", "Freaky" and "You". Tetsuo Hiraga from Hot Shot Discs praised the composition and production of "Go to the Top". He commended how Kumi "played" with the lyrical content, and complimented the "futuristic" and "robotic" sounds. He went on to compliment her vocal abilities and the "attitude" portrayed in the track. A reviewer from CD Journal labelled the 8-bit elements were "cheap", he commended Kumi's "strong" delivery. The NHK (Japan Broadcasting Corporation) listed the song in the Red Team for their annual New Year's Eve countdown show, Kōhaku Uta Gassen.

== Commercial performance ==
"I languished, not knowing what direction I was going to take after life-changing events such as marriage and having a baby,” she said in a statement. “But I decided to come back to the stage and I am thrilled beyond words to be back in the No. 1 spot."

— Kumi discussing her comeback with "Go to the Top".

"Go to the Top" debuted at two on the Daily Japanese Oricon Singles Chart, moving to number one the following day; it later reached the top spot in its first week on the top 100. Its first week sales in Japan were an estimated 54,559 units. It became her eighth number one single and her first inside the 2010 decade. Despite this, this became Kumi's second number one single with the lowest first week sales; her lowest to date is her 2009 double a-side single "Alive/Physical Thing" with an estimated 32,468 units. Regarding the number one position, Kumi stated, "I decided to come back to the stage and I am thrilled beyond words to be back in the No. 1 spot." The song stayed in the top 100 for three weeks, and an additional three weeks inside the top 200.

It has sold over 69,390 units in Japan, her second lowest selling number single after "Alive/Physical Thing" with 44,725 units. As of October 2012, the single is her last single to reach number one on the Oricon Singles Chart and her last single to sell over 50,000 units. (Note: Sales provided by Oricon database and are rounded to the nearest thousand copies.) As of January 2016, Oricon's database has ranked "Go to the Top" as her 21 best selling single. It also reached number 10 on Billboard's Japan Hot 100 chart. "Go to the Top" was certified gold by the Recording Industry Association of Japan (RIAJ) for physical shipments of 100,000 units, her last single to be certified for physical shipments.

== Music video ==
The accompanying music video for "Go to the Top" was directed by Tomoe Nakano. This is Kumi's first animated music video, and her only collaboration with Nakano. The video opens with people inside a late-night cafe. In the distance, a television screen reads "The next single is a winter ballad single in December"; this is a reference to Kumi's December single Koishikute. The music video features an animated Kumi inside a giant robot, ready to race an opponent. The two robots get ready to race around a city circuit, with the crowd cheering them on. As they race, several obstacles are in the way. The opponent attacks Kumi, but crashes into the stadium. Due to some damage of her robot, she jumps out of the robot with a cyber–motocycle and races to the end. Winning, the opponent's robot is completely damage as the opponent emerges from it. The opponent, a woman, throws a pendant of Kumi and her. The video finishes with the pendant changing to the song's title. The music video premiered on October 24 on Japanese music television.

== Promotion and other appearances ==
Koda performed the song for the first time on her Premium Night: Love & Songs concert tour in Japan. It was later included on the live album, released on March 20, 2013. The song was included on Koda's Hall Tour 2014: Bon Voyage concert tour in Japan. It was included on the special medley segment, which also included the tracks: "Real Emotion", "Last Angel", "Crazy 4 U", "Gentle Words", "Anata Dake Ga", "Take Back", "Taboo", and "Lady Go!". It was later included on the live album and DVD release, released on October 3 and October 10, 2014. respectively. The DJ Aki and Asy remix was included on her Koda Kumi Driving Hit's 5 remix compilation (2013).

== Track listing ==
- Japanese CD single
1. "Go to the Top" – 3:50
2. "Darling" – 3:47
3. "Go to the Top" (DJ AKi ASY Remix) – 3:15
- Japanese CD/DVD single
1. "Go to the Top" – 3:50
2. "Darling" – 3:47
3. "Go to the Top" (DJ AKi ASY Remix) – 3:15
4. "Go to the Top" (music video)
- Japanese CD single
1. "Go to the Top" – 3:50
2. Includes bonus poster
- Digital Single
1. "Go to the Top" – 3:50
2. "Darling" – 3:47
3. "Go to the Top" (DJ AKi ASY Remix) – 3:15
- Digital Music Video
1. "Go to the Top" (music video)

== Credits and personnel ==
- Koda Kumi – vocals, background vocals, song writing
- Clarabell – composer, producer, arranger, programmer, engineer
- Yoichiro Nomura – composer, producer, arranger, programmer, engineer
- Kiyoto Konda – guitar
- DJ Aki – composer, remixer
- Takeo Yatabe – composer, remixer
- Tomoe Nakano – director
- Rhythm Zone - management, label
- Avex Trax - parent label, management

Credits adapted from the CD and DVD version of the single:

== Charts ==
| Chart (2012) | Peak position |
|---|---|
| Japan Daily (Oricon) | 1 |
| Japan Weekly (Oricon) | 1 |
| Japan Weekly (Japan Hot 100) | 10 |

== Certifications ==
| Region | Certification | Certified units/sales |
|---|---|---|
| Japan (RIAJ) | Gold | 69,390 |
