= Dance in the Rain (song) =

Single by Koda Kumi

from the album Walk of My Life
- Released: November 5, 2014
- Recorded: 2014
- Genre: R&B, dance
- Length: 3:21
- Label: Rhythm Zone
- Songwriters: Koda Kumi, her0ism • Ziggy • Melanie Fontana
- Producer: Masaki Yokobe

Koda Kumi singles chronology
"Fever: Legend Live" (2014)	"Dance in the Rain" (2014)	"Shhh!" (2016)

Music video
- "Dance in the Rain" on YouTube

"Dance In the Rain" is an R&B/pop single by Japanese singer-songwriter Koda Kumi. It received a worldwide release as a digital single and only received a physical release to her official fan club.

The music video became the first 360° VR music video to be compatible with the Oculus Rift.

== Information ==
Dance in the Rain is Japanese R&B-turned-pop artist Koda Kumi's fifty-eighth single. While the single was given a worldwide digital release, it was only released physically to her fan club. The physical single release carried the making-of for Dance in the Rain, which was not released publicly. Due to the limited release, it did not chart on Oricon.

The single became the first single with its music video released for the Oculus Rift, using 360° virtual reality. The music video was released coupled with the release of the Oculus Rift during the live promotional event in London. The production of Dance in the Rain was revealed in Tent London, an art festival held in London in 2014. The virtual reality music video was highly appreciated by the Londoners, with the music video climax standing out at the art festival.

The music video used three-dimensional sound effects, along with complete immersion.

== Charting ==
Dance in the Rain became Koda Kumi's first single since the creation of the Billboard Japan Hot 100 chart not to chart; however, it peaked at No. 54 on the Adult Contemporary Airplay chart.

== Music video ==
The music video for Dance in the Rain was directed by Masaki Yokobe a.k.a. YKBX, styled by Misha Janette, and was the first music video to be filmed for 360° virtual reality, compatible with the Oculus Rift.

On avex's official YouTube, a preview of the music video compatible with the Oculus Rift was uploaded. In the video, viewers could use the 360° view to rotate the camera and look at the video and set. At the end of the preview, Kumi walked out to promote the Oculus Rift and it's 360° compatibility.

== Track listing ==
CD
No.	Title	Lyrics	Music	Length
1.	"Dance in the Rain"	Koda Kumi	her0ism • Sigurd Rosnes • Melanie Fontana	3:18
2.	"Dance in the Rain" (Instrumental)		her0ism • Sigurd Rosnes • Melanie Fontana	3:19
Total length:				6:37

DVD
No.	Title	Length
1.	"Dance in the Rain" (Music Video)	3:53
2.	"Dance in the Rain" (Making Video)	6:31

Digital Single
No.	Title	Lyrics	Music	Length
1.	"Dance in the Rain"	Koda Kumi	her0ism • Sigurd Rosnes • Melanie Fontana	3:18

== Alternate versions ==
Dance in the Rain

1. Dance in the Rain: found on the single, the corresponding album Walk of My Life (2015) and compilation album Winter of Love (2016)
2. Dance in the Rain (Instrumental): found on the single
3. Dance in the Rain [TEXTOR Remix]: found on Koda Kumi Driving Hit's 7 (2017)

== Chart ==
Chart (2014)	Peak position
Billboard Japan Adult Contemporary Airplay	54
