= Dreaming Now! =

Single by Koda Kumi

from the album Bon Voyage
- Released: November 13, 2013 (JP)
- Recorded: 2013
- Genre: Japanese pop/R&B/Hip-hop
- Label: Rhythm Zone
- Songwriter: Koda Kumi

Koda Kumi singles chronology
"Summer Trip" (2013)	"Dreaming Now!" (2013)	"Hotel" (2014)

CD only
- Dreaming Now! CD

Music video
- "Dreaming Now!" on YouTube

Dreaming Now! is the fifty-sixth single by Japanese singer-songwriter Koda Kumi and was released on November 13, 2013. It charted at No. 5 on Oricon, took No. 9 for the weekly ranking and charted for four weeks.

The song was written by Kumi in honor of Japan's part in the "2013 Volleyball World Grand Champion Cup" for men and women, both of which were held in Japan.

The single contained one b-side, "XXX."

== Background information ==
Dreaming Now! is pop/R&B singer-songwriter Koda Kumi's fifty-sixth single under the Avex sub-label Rhythm Zone. It was released on the artist's 31st birthday on November 13. The single debuted at No. 5 and peaked at No. 4 on the Oricon Singles Charts, remaining on the charts for one month. During its four-week run, the single shifted 25,953 units. The single was of a limited release made to honor Japan's part in the "2013 Volleyball World Champion Cup" for men and women.

The single was released in three editions, with each edition carrying different lives for the third track. Standard CD and CD+DVD editions held "XXX" and a live version of "Ai no Uta" to couple the a-side; fan club editions replaced the live of "Ai no Uta" with a live version of "All for you"; on the Hibiya Yagai Anniversary Edition, a live version of "LALALALALA" was used for track three.

== Packaging ==
The single was released in five editions:

- CD
- CD+DVD
- CD+KODA KUMIxEMODA tote bag [Fan Club Edition]
- CD+DVD+KODA KUMIxEMODA tote bag [Fan Club Edition]
- CD [Hibiya Yagai Anniversary Edition]

Limited editions of the standard CD and CD+DVD came with the live of her 2007 ballad "Ai no Uta," which she performed at ZUSHI FES'13.

== Music video ==
The single's video carried a volleyball theme to support the World Cup, and included a heavy dance number, making it her first video to have a full original dance since 2009's "ECSTASY."

== Track List ==
=== CD ===
1. Dreaming Now!
  Lyrics: Koda Kumi
  Music: Mitsu J
2. XXX
  Lyrics: Koda Kumi
  Music: T-SK • Hiromi Rainbow • Gabriele Guidi • Michela Lombardi
3. Ai no Uta [LIVE @ZUSHI FES'13]
  Lyrics: Koda Kumi • Kosuke Morimoto
  Music: Kosuke Morimoto

=== DVD ===
1. Dreaming Now! (Music Video)
  Producer: Seki Ryuji • Akihiro Kubo (MFG)
2. IS THIS TRAP? [Live at a-nation island 2013]
  Producer: Akihiro Kubo (MFG)
3. Dreaming Now! (Making Video)
  Producer: Akirhiro Kubo (MFG)

=== Fan Club Edition ===
1. Dreaming Now!
2. XXX
3. All for you [Live at Premium Night 〜Love & Songs〜]

=== Hibiya Yagai Anniversary Edition ===
1. Dreaming Now!
2. XXX
3. LALALALALA [Live at Summer Trip Live 2013]

== Charts ==
=== Oricon Sales Chart (Japan) ===
Release	Chart	Peak position	First Day/Week Sales	Sales total	Chart run
November 13, 2013	Oricon Daily Charts	4			
November 13, 2013	Oricon Weekly Charts	9	21,135	25,953	4-week
November 13, 2013	Oricon Monthly Charts	145	25,953		
November 13, 2013	Oricon Yearly Charts	276			

== Alternate Versions ==
Dreaming Now!

1. Dreaming Now!: Found on the single (2013) and corresponding album Bon Voyage (2014)
2. Dreaming Now! [TJO & YUSUKE from BLU-SWING Remix]: Found on Koda Kumi Driving Hit's 6 (2014)

XXX

1. XXX: Found on the single (2013)
2. XXX [4 Skips vs. Floorbreaker EDM Remix]: Found on Koda Kumi Driving Hit's 6 (2014)
