= Color the Cover =

Studio album by Koda Kumi
- Released: February 27, 2013
- Recorded: 2013
- Genre: J-pop; electronic; jazz
- Label: Rhythm Zone

Koda Kumi chronology
Beach Mix (2012)	Color the Cover (2013)	Driving Hit's 5 (2013)

Color the Cover (stylized as Color The Cover) is the second cover album by Japanese singer-songwriter Koda Kumi, following her 2010 cover album Eternity ~Love & Songs~. It came in at No. 3 on Oricon and remained on the charts for nine weeks.

She covered various popular songs from famous artists, including hide, Shizuka Kudo, Kome Kome Club, Kenji Ozawa, UA and Mayo Okamoto, among others.

Kumi's performance of "Alone," originally by Mayo Okamoto, had previously been placed on her single Koishikute as the coupling track on December 26, 2012.

== Information ==
Color the Cover is the second cover album by Japanese singer-songwriter Koda Kumi, released on February 27, 2013. The album charted well on the Oricon Albums Charts, taking the No. 3 spot for the week and remaining on the charts for nine consecutive weeks.

Unlike her previous cover album, Eternity ~Love & Songs~, the songs used for Color The Cover were remastered to have a modern vibe, but still hold the tune of the original tracks. The album contained two predominate genres, electronica and pop. Covered songs included "Pink Spider," which was originally performed by hide from X Japan before his untimely death in 1998; Shizuka Kudo's most well-known song "Blue Velvet"; and "Shake Hip!", which was originally by the group Kome Kome Club.

For promotions, Koda Kumi performed several songs on various television programs, including "Shake Hip!" and "Blue Velvet", with their original artists. The performance of "Shake Hip!" was also the first time Kumi and Kome Kome Club's Tatsuya Ishii shared a stage since Kumi's 2006 single KAMEN.

"Alone," originally by Mayo Okamoto, can also be found on Kumi's 2012 December single Koishikute as the coupling track. "Alone" had been the song Kumi performed when she initially auditioned for Avex Trax's avex dream 2000 auditions. This ultimately led to her being signed to Avex's sub-label Rhythm Zone.

== Track listing ==
CD
No.	Title	Lyrics	Music	Original artist	Length
1.	"Pink Spider (ピンク スパイダー / PINKU SUPAIDAA)"	hide	hide	hide with spread beaver	3:36
2.	"Shake Hip!"	Satoshi Nakamura	Mitsu J	Kome Kome Club	3:46
3.	"Lovely (ラブリー / RABURII)"	Kenji Ozawa	Yuasa Atsushi • Saitō Yuki	Kenji Ozawa	5:52
4.	"Jounetsu (情熱 / Passion)"	UA	Isawa Kazuha	UA	3:41
5.	"One More Time, One More Chance"	Toshiyuki Mori	Curly Giraffe	Masayoshi Yamazaki	5:39
6.	"Alone"	Mayo Okamoto	Minakawa Masato	Mayo Okamoto	5:08
7.	"Blue Velvet"	HATA	Inoue Makijiro	Shizuka Kudo	3:54
8.	"「Otoko」 (「男」 / "Men")"	Kubo Ruriko	Nomura Yoichiro	Kubo Ruriko	3:46
9.	"Dou ni mo tomaranai (どうにもとまらない / I Won't Stop)"	Yū Aku	h-wonder	Linda Yamamoto	2:27
10.	"Koyoi no Tsuki no Youni (今宵の月のよう / Just Like the Moon)"	Koji Miyamoto	Watanabe Zentaro	Elephant Kashimashi	4:38
11.	"Uta wa Wa ga Inochi (歌は我が命 / Singing is My Life)"	Ou Yoshida	Sato Jun	Hibari Misora	4:35

DVD
No.	Title	Length
1.	"Pink Spider (Album Version)" (Music Video)	3:49
2.	"Lovely" (Music Video)	5:53
3.	"Shake Hip!" (Music Video)	4:00
4.	"Lovely" (Making Video)
5.	"Shake Hip!" (Making Video)
6.	"Documentary Movie 「THE REAL ME」" (Limited Edition Only)

== Oricon Charts (Japan) ==
Release	Oricon Singles Chart	Peak position	First week sales (copies)	Sales total (copies)
February 27, 2013	Daily Chart	2		48,395
February 27, 2013	Weekly Chart	3	33,993	48,395
February 27, 2013	Monthly Chart (February)	11	33,993	48,395
February 27, 2013	Monthly Chart (March)	46	13,083	48,395

== Alternate versions ==
Shake Hip!

1. Shake Hip!: Found on the album (2013)
2. Shake Hip! [John Fontein (RE:LABEL®) Remix]: Found on Koda Kumi Driving Hit's 5 (2013)

One more time, One more chance

1. One more time, One more chance: Found on the album (2013)
2. One more time, One more chance [Shohei Matsumoto & Junichi Matsuda Remix]: Found on Koda Kumi Driving Hit's 5 (2013)
