= Come with Me (Koda Kumi song) =

Single by Koda Kumi

from the album Feel My Mind
- Released: August 27, 2003
- Recorded: 2003
- Genre: J-pop
- Length: 32:29
- Label: Rhythm Zone
- Songwriters: Koda Kumi (words; "Come with Me") h-wonder (music; "Come with Me"); Kenn Kato (words "Real Emotion"); Kazuhiro Hara (music; "Real Emotion"); Kazushige Nojima (words; "1000 no kotoba"); Norito Matsueda & Takahito Eguchi (music; "1000 no kotoba")

Koda Kumi singles chronology
"Real Emotion/1000 no Kotoba" (2003)	"Come with Me" (2003)	"Gentle Words" (2003)

Music video
- "Come with Me" on YouTube

"Come with Me" (stylized in all caps) is Japanese singer-songwriter Koda Kumi's eighth domestic solo single. The single charted at No. 14 on Oricon and stayed on the charts for nine weeks.

== Information ==
Come with Me is Japanese artist Koda Kumi's eighth domestic solo single and ranked No. 14 on the weekly Oricon Singles Charts, failing to perform as well as her previous single, real Emotion/1000 no Kotoba. The single charted for nine weeks. Due to the low ranking, Kumi said that she felt she was unable to perform a hit song without a famous name attached.

The b-sides on the single were English versions of "real Emotion" and "1000 no Kotoba." These versions were not the ones that were included in the North American and European releases of the Final Fantasy X-2 video game, however; the English versions found in the game were sung by Jade Villalon from the group Sweetbox. The lyrics in Kumi's original versions differ slightly from those used for Jade's version.

The single was also released as a 12" vinyl with the title track and remixes of "real Emotion" and "1000 no Kotoba."

== Promotional advertisements ==
"Come with Me" was used in a television commercial for Choya Umeshu's "Ume jelly," which is a semi-sweet gelatinous dessert.

== Music video ==
The music video for "Come with Me" was centered around a beach party theme in Thailand. In the video, the speaking parts were subtitled in Japanese.

While the video was released publicly during the single's initial debut, it was not available to purchase until the release of her DVD feel.... The DVD was released the same day as the single's corresponding album Feel My Mind.

== Track listing ==
(Source)

=== CD ===
CD
No.	Title	Lyrics	Music	Arrangers	Length
1.	"Come with Me"	Koda Kumi	h-wonder	h-wonder	4:48
2.	"real Emotion" (English Version)	Kenn Kato • Sachi Bennett	Kazuhiro Hara	h-wonder	4:02
3.	"1000 no Kotoba" (English Version)	Kazushige Nojima • Sachi Bennett • Brian Gray	Takahito Eguchi • Noriko Matsueda	Takahito Eguchi • Noriko Matsueda	5:59
4.	"real Emotion" (DJ MSK Remix)	Kenn Kato	DJ MSK	h-wonder	4:18
5.	"1000 no Kotoba" (DJ 19 Remix)	Kazushige Nojima	DJ 19	Takahito Eguchi • Noriko Matsueda	8:34
6.	"Come with Me" (Instrumental)		h-wonder	h-wonder	4:46

=== 12" vinyl ===
Side A
No.	Title	Lyrics	Music	Arrangers	Length
1.	"Come with Me"	Koda Kumi	h-wonder	h-wonder	4:48

Side B
No.	Title	Lyrics	Music	Arrangers	Length
1.	"real Emotion" (DJ MSK Remix)	Kenn Kato	DJ MSK	h-wonder	4:18
2.	"1000 no Kotoba" (DJ 19 Remix)	Kazushige Nojima	DJ 19	Takahito Eguchi • Noriko Matsueda	8:34

== Charts and sales ==
Oricon ranking (Weekly)	Sales
14	41,370

== Alternate versions ==
Come with Me

1. Come with Me: Found on the single (2003) and corresponding album Feel My Mind (2004)
2. Come with Me [Instrumental]: Found on the single (2003)
3. Come with Me [Overhead Champion Remix]: Found on Beach Mix (2012)
