= Uzi (Japanese rapper) =

Japanese musician

Uzi (pronounced as "Uji") is a popular Japanese hip-hop artist. He has released four major albums, most recently his Natural 9 album released in March 2008. Uzi is one of the rappers to incorporate more overt elements of Japanese culture into his music and videos, specifically aspects referring to the samurai (to which he claims direct ancestry). He is a great example of an artist who maintains the localization of hip-hop music through his dependence on the incorporation of Japanese themes into his work. Such non-Americanization of his hip-hop music has been met with varying opinions; some view this as disrespectful of the origins of hip-hop culture, while there are those who appreciate Uzi’s apparent embracing of Japanese culture.

== Japanese musical influences ==
Much of Uzi's musical influences correspond with his national identity as a corollary of the fact that "Japanese have long perceived themselves, and been perceived by others as one homogeneous group, racially, ethnically, and culturally identical". As such, a number of his influences [even regarding hip-hop specifically] are Japanese artists. Some songs and their artists which Uzi lists as musical influences include: Knock Out feat. Zeebra 2002 produced by Inovader 新日本プロレスエンディングテーマ, ひとり酒 Drinking by Myself 2003 produced by Sub Zero, 開放軍 III feat. 神, Kenta 5 Rus, Masaru, 565, Aktion, Dob-Roc 2006 produced by Lucha a.k.a. Kut.
