= Secret (Koda Kumi album) =

Studio album by Koda Kumi
- Released: February 9, 2005; April 13, 2005 (special editions)
- Recorded: 2004
- Studios: Avex Studio; Avex Studio Azabu; On Air Azabu
- Genres: Pop; R&B
- Length: 63:23
- Label: Rhythm Zone
- Producer: Max Matsuura

Koda Kumi chronology
Feel My Mind (2004)	Secret (2005)	Best: First Things (2005)

Singles from Secret
- 1. "Love & Honey" Released: May 26, 2004; 2. "Chase" Released: July 28, 2004; 3. "Kiseki" Released: September 8, 2004; 4. "Hands" Released: January 19, 2005; 5. "Hot Stuff" Released: April 13, 2005

Secret is the fourth studio album by Japanese singer-songwriter Koda Kumi, released on February 9, 2005. This album also jump-started Kumi's ero-kawaii/sexy-cute image, with which she became synonymous. This style later spread throughout Japan's high school community upon her release of "Butterfly".

Commercially, the record peaked at number three on the Oricon Albums Chart in Japan, becoming her highest-charting album at the time. It remained on the chart for 56 weeks. It sold over 600,000 copies in the country and was certified 2× Platinum by the Recording Industry Association of Japan (RIAJ).

== Background and release ==
Secret is the first predominantly-pop album by Kumi, with her first three albums, feel my mind, grow into one and affection, being R&B. Due to Kumi feeling most comfortable with the style she donned in "Crazy 4 U", she created the "sexy-cute" style (known as ero-kawaii) for her A-sides used in secret. This is the style that she became famous for and received both positive and negative attention. During her performance for "Cutie Honey" at Music Station, she donned the outfit she wore during the jazz parlor scenes in the Music video. The outfit was heavily criticized, when revealing clothing was not worn by mainstream artists in Japan at the time.

On April 13, 2005, three special editions of the album were released, which contained the Music video for "Hot Stuff", which featured the rapper KM-Markit and, depending on which special edition was purchased, came with a T-shirt or a tank top.

The DVD contained the Music videos originally released on her first DVD single, "Girls: Selfish": "Selfish", "Shake It" and "24". The song "24", which was written and composed by the arranger Hitoshi Shimono, was the first song released by Kumi with an entire chorus in English. She worked with Hitoshi again for her 2006 song "Feel", which also contained a chorus completely in English.

== Packaging ==
Secret was released in four editions: CD, CD+DVD and a special CD+DVD edition. While the standard editions of the CD and CD+DVD combinations contained the fifteen musical tracks, the special editions contained two bonus songs and a bonus Music video. This edition also had achoice of either a tank top or a t-shirt.

The two bonus tracks contained on the special editions were "It's a Small World", which featured the female duo the Heartsdales, and a remix of "Hot Stuff", which featured the rappers KM-Markit and Uzi. The bonus Music video on the DVD of this version was the Music video for the latter track. Each edition contained different cover art.The CD only contained a blue heart, the CD+DVD contained a pink heart and the special edition contained a holographic heart.

== Music videos ==
Two new Music videos were released on the DVD: the album version of "Hands", which was the first time a different version of a Music video was released, and "Trust You". There was a different version of "Trust You" released on her "Hot Stuff" single, titled "Thanks to Mam & Gramma Version". While there were only two new Music videos, the Music videos from "Girls: Selfish" were also placed on the album, because of "Girls: Selfish" being unsuccessful as a DVD single. These videos were "Selfish", "Shake It" and "24".

The video for "Trust You" was set in the future where men use technology to set women to perform. The A.Is, Kumi along with two others, are able to become sentient and reclaim dominance. "Selfish" carries a story of female vampires luring men to their hideout so they are able to live off their life force. "Shake It" carries a story of a man breaking into a tent, owned by Kumi. Kumi and her followers seduce him and convince him to leave. It is shown at the end he makes a phone call to an unknown source. The video for "24" contains a soft and sensual concept, showing Kumi in her downtime as she fantasizes about a lover. The Music video to "Hot Stuff" was later placed on the DVD when the special edition was released two months later. The Music video carried a dance battle theme, which had been inspired by the North American film You Got Served, which featured Omarion Grandberry and Marques Houston. Kumi later featured Omarion in 2012 "Slow" from her album Japonesque (2012).

== Endorsements ==
"Selfish" was used as the theme to the 20th East Women's Ekiden. "Hearty..." was used as the promotional theme for the Kojima Ltd. product Fresh Gray 2005. "Trust You" was used as MTV Japan's Buzz Asia theme for March 2005. "24" was used as the theme song for Sanctuary / Otona no Seiiki. "Let's Party" was used for the television advertisement of Shueisha's More. "It's a Small World" was used as the theme song for Japan's release of the 2004 film 80 Days.

== Track listing ==
Secret – Standard edition
No.	Title	Lyrics	Music	Arrangement	Length
1.	"Intro: Get Down"	Daisuke "D.I" Imai	Daisuke "D.I" Imai	Daisuke "D.I" Imai	1:27
2.	"Cutie Honey"	Claude Q.	Takeo Watanabe	H-Wonder	3:05
3.	"Hot Stuff" (featuring KM-Markit)	Kumi Koda, KM-Markit	Daisuke "D.I" Imai	Daisuke "D.I" Imai	4:07
4.	"Selfish"	Miki Watanabe	Miki Watanabe	Miki Watanabe	3:56
5.	"Hands"	Kumi Koda	Katsumi Ohnishi	H-Wonder	4:24
6.	"Hearty..."	Kumi Koda	Yasuo Ohtani	Yasuo Ohtani	3:32
7.	"Shake It"	Kumi Koda	Daisuke "D.I" Imai	Daisuke "D.I" Imai	3:48
8.	"Kiseki"	Kumi Koda, Kosuke Morimoto	Kosuke Morimoto	Reo Nishikawa	4:59
9.	"Trust You"	Kumi Koda, Toru Watanabe	Toru Watanabe	Daisuke "D.I" Imai	4:27
10.	"Chase"	Kumi Koda, Kazuhiro Hara	Kazuhiro Hara	H-Wonder	5:00
11.	"Love Holic"	Kumi Koda	Tsutomu Yamasaki	H-Wonder	4:25
12.	"24"	Kumi Koda, Hitoshi Shimono	Hitoshi Shimono	Hitoshi Shimono	5:40
13.	"Let's Party"	Hinaco	Junpei Takada	H-Wonder	4:40
14.	"Believe"	Kumi Koda	Kaido	Masaki Iehara	4:30
15.	"Through the Sky"	Kumi Koda, Hiroo Yamaguchi	Hiroo Yamaguchi	Hiroo Yamaguchi	5:34
Total length:					63:23

Secret – Special edition (bonus tracks)
No.	Title	Lyrics	Music	Arrangement	Length
16.	"It's a Small World" (featuring Heartsdales)	Richard M. Sherman, Robert B. Sherman	Richard M. Sherman, Robert B. Sherman		2:46
17.	"Hot Stuff (Remix)" (featuring Uzi & KM-Markit)	Kumi Koda, KM-Markit, Uzi	Daisuke "D.I" Imai	Sub-Zero	4:17
Total length:					70:26

Secret – DVD
No.	Title	Length
1.	"Cutie Honey" (Music video)
2.	"Chase" (Music video)
3.	"Kiseki" (Music video)
4.	"Selfish" (Music video)
5.	"Shake It" (Music video)
6.	"24" (Music video)
7.	"Hands [Album Version]" (Music video)
8.	"Trust You" (Music video)
9.	"Hot Stuff featuring KM-Markit" (Music video)

== Charts ==
=== Weekly charts ===
Chart (2005)	Peak position
Japanese Albums (Oricon)	3

=== Year-end charts ===
Chart (2005)	Position
Japanese Albums (Oricon)	22

== Sales and certifications ==
Region	Certification	Certified units/sales
Japan (RIAJ)	2× Platinum	600,000
