= Chase (Koda Kumi song) =

Single by Koda Kumi

from the album Secret
- B-side: "Heat feat. Megaryu"
- Released: July 28, 2004 (JP)
- Recorded: 2004
- Genre: Pop, Hip hop
- Length: 18:26
- Label: Rhythm Zone; RZCD-45137 (Japan, CD5")
- Songwriter: Koda Kumi • Hara Kazuhiro

Koda Kumi singles chronology
"Love & Honey" (2004)	"Chase" (2004)	"Kiseki" (2004)

Music video
- "Chase" on YouTube

"Chase" is Koda Kumi's 12th domestic CD single. It reached No. 18 on Oricon and stayed on the charts for eight weeks.

== Information ==
Chase is Japanese R&B-turned-pop singer-songwriter Koda Kumi's twelfth single. The single failed to chart in the top ten on Oricon, coming it at No. 18. Despite this, the single charted for eight weeks.

The single continued her transition from an R&B artist to a pop artist, whereas both this song and her last single, Love & Honey, were categorized under the pop genre. This is most notably due to Love & Honey starting her new album era of secret.

The title song is the ending theme for ANB's program Summer〜Suspicious of Yuka xx What it Becomes!! (さまぁ〜ずと優香の怪しい××貸しちゃうのかよ!! / SAMAA〜to Yuka no ayashii××kashi chau no kayo!!).

Despite the a-side being Chase, the single's artwork was inspired more by its b-side, Heat, which featured reggae duo MEGARYU, composed of MEGA HORN and RYU REX.

== Music video ==
The video features two thieves (both played by Kumi): a jewel thief and a bank robber. The jewel thief takes on the job as a hotel maid, going into others' rooms and stealing their prized jewels. The bank robber is staying in the same hotel, unaware there are police searching for her downstairs in the lobby. When the jewel thief sees the police, she willingly accepts her arrest, only to see that the officers had found and arrested the bank robber, instead.

The ending scene leads into Kumi's next single, Kiseki.

== Track listing ==
CD
No.	Title	Lyrics	Music	Arranger(s)	Length
1.	"Chase"	Koda Kumi • Hara Kazuhiro	Hara Kazuhiro	h-wonder	5:00
2.	"Heat feat. MEGARYU"	Koda Kumi • Jewels from Heartsdales • MEGA-HORN	Daisuke "D.I" Imai	Daisuke Imai	4:17
3.	"Chase" (Instrumental)		Hara Kazuhiro	h-wonder	5:00
4.	"Heat feat. MEGARYU" (Instrumental)		Daisuke Imai	Daisuke Imai	4:13

== Chart history ==
Peak position: #18

=== Sales ===
First week estimate: 11,764 Total estimate: 21,690

== Alternate versions ==
Chase

1. Chase: Found on the single (2004) and corresponding album secret (2005)
2. Chase [Instrumental]: Found on the single (2004)
3. Chase [Caramel Pod Remix]: Found on Koda Kumi Driving Hit's 3 (2011)

Heat feat. MEGARYU

1. Heat feat. MEGARYU: Found on the single (2004)
2. Heat feat. MEGARYU [Instrumental]: Found on the single (2004)
3. Heat feat. MEGARYU [REO Remix]: Found on Beach Mix (2012)
