= Stay with Me (Koda Kumi song) =

Single by Koda Kumi

from the album Trick
- B-side: "Winter Bell"
- Released: December 24, 2008
- Genre: J-pop, pop
- Length: 4:58
- Label: Rhythm Zone
- Songwriter: Koda Kumi

Koda Kumi singles chronology
"Taboo" (2008)	"Stay with Me" (2008)	"It's All Love!" (2009)

Music video
- "Stay with Me" on YouTube

"Stay with Me" (stylized as stay with me) is the forty-second single by Japanese R&B/pop artist Koda Kumi. It charted at No. 1 on the Oricon Weekly charts and remained on the charts for nine weeks. This became the first time Kumi released two consecutive No. 1 singles, whereas her previous single, "Taboo," also charted at number one.

The single was released in both CD and CD+DVD, with limited editions of both. A version was also released exclusively for her fan club.

== Information ==
stay with me is Japanese singer-songwriter Koda Kumi's forty-second single. It debuted at No. 1 on Oricon, making it her sixth number-one single and the first time in her career to have released two number-one singles back-to-back, whereas Taboo had also charted at No. 1. The single remained on the Oricon charts for nine weeks.

stay with me was described as a "winter love ballad" by her official site. Limited editions of the single featured an orgel version of stay with me, a poster and a draw card, similar to that of Taboo.

This was also the second time one of her singles received an exclusive release for her fan club. Those editions included a poster, but also gave the buyers the option of a mirror or mousepad with the fan club CD picture on it.

The single contained one b-side, Winter Bell. This was a more upbeat song and carried an overall Christmas-time feel with signature bells being heard in the song's opening and during the song's chorus.

The single is certified Gold by RIAJ for shipment of 100,000 copies.

== Packaging ==
stay with me was released in three editions:

- CD: contains four musical tracks.
- CD [Fan Club Edition]: contains two musical tracks, poster and choice of a mirror or mouse pad.
- CD+DVD: contains four musical tracks, music video and making video.

Limited editions of the CD and CD+DVD versions came with a poster and the bonus "orgel version" of stay with me.

== Promotional Advertisements ==
stay with me was used in advertisements for au LISMO and Sony Ericsson in Japan.

== Music video ==
The music video for stay with me carried a theme similar to her 2006 single Yume no Uta/Futari de..., most notably futari de... for the visuals. The video also centered around the use of a cellphone, much like the aforementioned single.

The video carried a story of a woman, played by Kumi, who was having conflicting feelings over a love interest after a fight. She goes to the train station, which was shown to be the place they first met, and sends a photo via cellphone to her partner. Throughout the video, she envisions him arriving and continually checks her phone awaiting his response. After waiting for what is presumed to be an allotted amount of time, she leaves the platform and goes to sit outside. A message then sends to her phone, which reads, "I want to start over . . . I love you." She looks up to see her partner and he runs to her.

== Track list ==
(Source)

CD
No.	Title	Lyrics	Music	Arranger(s)	Length
1.	"stay with me"	Koda Kumi	Kazuto Narumi	Daisuke Kahara	04:58
2.	"Winter Bell"	Koda Kumi	Ryuichiro Yamaki	Hiroto Suzuki	04:09
3.	"stay with me" (Orgel Version)			Shinjiro Inoue	02:40
4.	"stay with me" (Instrumental)		Kazuto Narumi	Daisuke Kahara	04:54
5.	"Winter Bell" (Instrumental)		Ryuichiro Yamaki	Hiroto Suzuki	04:08

DVD: Music Videos
No.	Title	Length
1.	"stay with me" (Music Video)	05:08
2.	"stay with me [Another Edition]" (Music Video)

CD: Fanclub Limited Edition
No.	Title	Lyrics	Music	Arranger(s)	Length
1.	"stay with me"	Koda Kumi	Kazuto Narumi	Daisuke Kahara	04:58
2.	"stay with me" (Instrumental)		Kazuto Narumi	Daisuke Kahara	04:54

== Charts ==
=== Oricon Sales Chart (Japan) ===
Release	Chart	Peak position	First week sales	Sales total	Chart run
December 24, 2008	Oricon Daily Charts	1			
December 24, 2008	Oricon Weekly Charts	1	39,860	70,657	8 Weeks
December 24, 2008	Oricon Monthly Charts	3			
December 24, 2008	Oricon Yearly Charts	88			

=== Billboard Japan Sales chart ===
Release	Chart	Peak position
December 24, 2008	Billboard Japan Hot 100	1
December 24, 2008	Billboard Japan Hot Top Airplay	4
December 24, 2008	Billboard Japan Hot Singles Sales	1

== Alternate Versions ==
stay with me

1. stay with me: Found on the single (2008) and corresponding album TRICK (2009)
2. stay with me [Orgel Version]: Found on the single (2008)
3. stay with me [Instrumental]: Found on the single (2008)
4. stay with me [Tomoharu Moriya Remix]: Found on Koda Kumi Driving Hit's 2 (2010)
