= Feel My Mind =

Studio album by Koda Kumi
- Released: February 18, 2004
- Recorded: 2003
- Genres: Pop; R&B
- Length: 62:25
- Label: Rhythm Zone
- Producer: Max Matsuura

Koda Kumi chronology
Grow into One (2003)	Feel My Mind (2004)	Secret (2005)

Singles from Feel My Mind
- 1. "Come With Me" Released: August 27, 2003; 2. "Gentle Words" Released: December 10, 2003; 3. "Crazy 4 U" Released: January 15, 2004; 4. "Love & Honey" Released: May 26, 2004

Feel My Mind (stylized in lower case) is the third studio album by the Japanese pop and R&B singer Koda Kumi, released in February 2004. The album charted in the Top 10 on Oricon at No. 7 and stayed on the charts for thirty-five weeks, selling over 147,000 copies. Its corresponding DVD was feel... (not to be confused with her single feel, which came out in January 2006) and was her last album to be released as a CD only without a CD+DVD option.

== Information ==
Feel my mind is singer-songwriter Koda's third studio album and her last album to carry predominantly R&B tracks, as she produced mainly pop music beginning from her next album, secret, and onward. The album entered the top ten on Oricon at No. 7 and remained on the charts for nearly two months.

Feel my mind is credited with jump-starting Kumi's ero-kawaii/sexy-cute image, with which she later became synonymous. This image was cemented with her following album, Secret. However, Kumi later admitted in Koda Reki how she was nervous to take the "sexy-cute" image because she was nervous of disappointing her parents.

The limited editions of the album contained the tracks "Yume with You [R. Yamaki's Groove Mix]" – the original edition was released on her single "Crazy 4 U" and "Cutie Honey", which was later released on the single "Love & Honey". "Yume with You" was a cover of the Toshinobu Kubota song of the same title, initially released in 1993.

The song "magic" (track No. 11) was composed by the female R&B singer and music producer Lisa, who Kumi had collaborated with for the song "one" on her Grow into One album, and went on to collaborate with again for the song "Switch", which also featured the Heartsdales.

Due to the album only being released as a CD version, a corresponding DVD was released the same day, feel.... The DVD contained three music videos from the album, with an interview, bonus pictures and the original television commercials for all of the singles released.

== Packaging ==
Feel my mind was released in two editions:

- CD: contains twelve musical tracks.
- CD [Limited Edition]: contains fourteen musical tracks.

The limited editions had two bonus tracks: a remix og "Yume with You" and "Cutie Honey", which was later released as a single.

== Music videos ==
Despite being released only as a CD, the album did contained a corresponding DVD: Feel.... The DVD contained the music videos released as A-sides from her singles during the era for the album. Those music videos included:

- "Come With Me" – set at night during a party on a beach in Thailand. The speaking parts in the music video are subtitled in Japanese.
- "Gentle Words" – set as the prelude for "Kiseki", which shows Kumi longing for a loved one.
- "Crazy 4 U" – set in Tokyo with an espionage theme, having Kumi in several incarnations.

== Background narration ==
"The artist that Koda Kumi should represent finally became clear. When I look back at the years until 2003, I was filled with enthusiasm, but had no clear goal... The fog in front of my eyes cleared and the path I should walk became visible." – Koda Kumi

On the release of Feel my mind, Kumi spoke in Koda Reki of how singing became more enjoyable due to her finding her own style – both in music and fashion. She explained that the reason her first few years were difficult was because she did not know who she wanted to be on stage, but because she began to find herself, more people started to support her and attend her events. Though she had attracted attention with her cover of "Cutie Honey", she was overwhelmed with criticism from the clothes she donned at Music Station.

"There were a lot of things that upset me . . . I wanted to believe in my own style that had taken so long to find. No matter what other people said, I didn't want to give up... I usually got scared easily, but I pushed through my own ideas for the first time." – Koda Kumi

== Track listing ==
(Source)

No.	Title	Lyrics	Music	Arrangement	Length
1.	"Break It Down"	Kumi Koda • Daisuke Imai	Daisuke Imai	Daisuke Imai	4:29
2.	"Crazy 4 U"	Miki Watanabe	Miki Watanabe	Miki Watanabe	4:06
3.	"Rock Your Body"	Kumi Koda • Daisuke Imai	Daisuke Imai	Daisuke Imai	4:12
4.	"Rain"	Kumi Koda	Hiroo Yamaguchi	Miki Watanabe	5:08
5.	"Without Your Love"	Kumi Koda • Daisuke Imai	Daisuke Imai	Daisuke Imai	4:44
6.	"Talk to You"	Kumi Koda	Kazuhiro Hara	Miki Watanabe	4:26
7.	"Hana (華 / Flower)"	Kumi Koda • Tooko	Kaido	Reo Nishikawa	5:03
8.	"Get out the Way"	Kumi Koda	Akira	Akira	3:40
9.	"Sweet Love..."	Kumi Koda • Tooko	Kaido	Reo Nishikawa	5:12
10.	"Gentle Words"	Kumi Koda	D.A.I.	h-wonder	3:37
11.	"Magic feat. LISA"	Ken Matsubara	Elizabeth Narita	Elizabeth Narita • Ryuichiro Yamaki	4:57
12.	"Come With Me"	Kumi Koda • Yumi Kawamura	h-wonder	h-wonder	4:46

Bonus tracks
No.	Title	Lyrics	Music	Remix	Length
13.	"Yume with You" (R. Yamaki's Groove Mix)	Toshinobu Kubota	Toshinobu Kubota	Ryuichiro Yamaki	4:52
14.	"Cutie Honey"	Claude Q	Takeo Watanabe	h-wonder	3:05

== Charts and sales ==
Oricon Ranking (Weekly)	Sales
7	153,746

== Alternative versions ==
"Rain"
"Rain": Found on the album (2004)
"Rain [Unplugged Version]": Found on "No Regret" single (2006)
"Rain [Album Version Instrumental]": Found on "No Regret" single (2006)<btr> "Rain [Plug in Language Remix]": Found on Koda Kumi Driving Hit's 2 (2010)
