= Hot Stuff (Koda Kumi song) =

"Hot Stuff feat. KM-MARKIT"

Single by Koda Kumi

from the album Secret
- B-side: Hot Stuff (remix); Trust you (remix); Selfish (remix)
- Released: April 13, 2005 (JP)
- Genre: Urban pop
- Label: Rhythm Zone; RZCD-45207/B (Japan, CD+DVD)
- Composer: Daisuke "D.I" Imai
- Lyricists: Koda Kumi, KM-MARKIT

Koda Kumi singles chronology
"Hands" (2005)	"Hot Stuff feat. KM-MARKIT" (2005)	"Butterfly" (2005)

"Hot Stuff" is Koda Kumi's 15th domestic single and features rapper KM-MARKIT. It was limited to 30,000 copies and, since its release, has sold over 29,000 copies. It managed to chart at No. 6 on Oricon and stayed on the charts for ten weeks. The single was only released in CD+DVD format.

== Information ==
Hot Stuff feat. KM-MARKIT is the fifteenth single by Japanese singer-songwriter Koda Kumi. It charted No. 10 on the Oricon charts and remained on the charts for ten weeks. The single was limited to 30,000 copies and has since sold over 29,000. The single was only released in CD+DVD format, with the CD containing four songs and the DVD carrying three videos, along with the making video of the title track.

"Hot Stuff" featured Japanese rapper KM-MARKIT, who was part of the Urbarian Gym (UBG) and, at the time, was making a debut as a solo artist under the Pony Canyon label.

The single contained three b-sides, all which were remixes. It also carried the "Kakuhen Musou Tenshou" (確変無想転生) remix for "Hot Stuff," which featured both KM-MARKIT and underground rapper UZI. The song was used in April 2005 as the ending theme to TX's television program Ryuha-R (流派－R / School-R). The song's remix was originally released as a bonus track on her secret album.

The DVD carried the music video to "Hot Stuff," along with the "Thanks to MAM & GRAMMA" version of "Trust You" and a live clip of "Selfish." The original video to "Trust You" was on her DVD girls ~Selfish~, as well as the corresponding album, secret. A dance version to "Hot Stuff" was later released on the DVD of her third compilation album, Best ~Bounce & Lovers~, though this version omitted KM-MARKIT's appearance in the video.

Kumi would collaborate again with KM-MARKIT for the song "Rainy Day," which was released on his debut album, Vivid, though he was under the Pony Canyon label. Vivid also harbored the music video for the song when placed into a DVD player.

== Music video ==
Along with featuring rapper KM-MARKIT, the music video to Hot Stuff carried a street fighting theme, along with underground hip-hop dancing themes.

The video opens with street fighting, but is predominantly centered around Kumi's dance crew battling the rival crew, which is hinted to be KM-MARKIT's, though the rapper is not featured in the dancing scenes. The music video was heavily inspired by the 2003 Chris Stokes film You Got Served, which had opened No. 1 at the box office upon its release and featured R&B rappers Marques Houston and Omari "Omarion" Grandberry.

A dance version was later released on her third compilation album Best ~Bounce & Lovers~. This edition omitted the street fighting scenes and KM-MARKIT's physical appearance, instead only focusing on the dance battle.

== Track listing ==
CD
No.	Title	Lyrics	Music	Arrangers	Length
1.	"Hot Stuff feat. KM-MARKIT"	Koda Kumi • KM-MARKIT	Daisuke "D.I" Imai	Daisuke "D.I" Imai	4:12
2.	"Hot Stuff feat. UZI & KM-MARKIT" (確変無想転生 remix)	Koda Kumi • KM-MARKIT	Daisuke "D.I" Imai	Daisuke "D.I" Imai • SUBZERO	4:20
3.	"Trust You" (Dub's Trust me Remix)	Koda Kumi • Toru Watanabe	Toru Watanabe	Dub Master X	6:31
4.	"Selfish" (D.I's C&B MIX)	Miki Watanabe	Daisuke "D.I" Imai	Miki Watanabe	3:56
Total length:					18:19

DVD: Music Video
No.	Title	Length
1.	"Hot Stuff feat. KM-MARKIT" (Music Video)	4:32
2.	"Trust You [Thanks to MAM & GRAMMA ver.]" (Music Video)	4:36
3.	"Selfish" (LIVE CLIP)	3:53
4.	"Hot Stuff feat. KM-MARKIT" (Making Video)	4:23

== Chart history ==
=== Oricon 2005 Singles Top 999 ===
Chart position: #313

=== Oricon Weekly Singles Top 200 ===
Chart position: #10

== Charts and sales ==
Oricon Ranking
(Weekly)
10

=== Sales ===
First week estimate: 16,807 Total estimate: 29,509

== Alternate versions ==
Hot Stuff feat. KM-MARKIT

1. Hot Stuff feat. KM-MARKIT: Found on the single and corresponding album secret (2005)
2. Hot Stuff feat. KM-MARKIT & UZI [確変無想転生 remix]: Found on the single and corresponding album secret (2005)
3. Hot Stuff feat. KM-MARKIT [Electrixx vs Heaven's Wire D'n'B Remix]: Found on Koda Kumi Driving Hit's 4 (2012)
