= Hotel (Koda Kumi song) =

Single by Koda Kumi

from the album Walk of My Life
- Released: August 6, 2014
- Recorded: 2014
- Genre: J-pop; R&B; dance-pop
- Label: Rhythm Zone
- Composers: H.U.B; Didrik Thott; Sebastian Thott; Ylva Dimburg
- Lyricist: Koda Kumi

Koda Kumi singles chronology
"Dreaming Now!" (2013)	"Hotel" (2014)	"Fever: Legend Live" (2014)

Hotel (stylized as HOTEL) is the fifty-seventh single by Japanese artist Koda Kumi. It was her first single release since 2013's "Dreaming Now!." It debuted at #5, but took the weekly position of #7 on Oricon and remained on the charts for four weeks. The a-side's music video was heavily inspired by Koda Kumi's time in Dubai.

The single contained two a-sides and one b-side. The a-sides were the title track and the song "Money In My Bag." The latter's music video was only released on the "fan club" edition of the single. The b-side was the pop/R&B track "Turn Around."

== Background information ==
Hotel is Japanese singer/songwriter Koda Kumi's fifty-seventh single under the Avex sub-label Rhythm Zone. The single debuted at #5 on the daily Oricon Singles Chart, but dropped in rank to take the number seven slot for the week. Despite not being a limited release, the single only charted for four weeks. The single became her first release in nearly a year, with the prior being "Dreaming Now!" in 2013.

"Hotel" carried three tracks, with two of the songs carrying corresponding music videos. The title track is mid-tempo dance track containing elements of synth-pop, R&B, reggae and hip hop music. The music video for the song was heavily inspired by Koda Kumi's time spent in Dubai, with the hotel in the video resembling the architecture and structures of the city. The coupling track "Money In My Bag" is a mostly hip-hop track, which Kumi had described as "not usually a category for "Koda Kumi," but how she "wanted to try a new style." The single's only b-side, "Turn Around," was a slower R&B/pop number with Kumi singing about the scent and experiences of summer.

== Music videos ==
"Hotel" was directed by videographer Kanji Sudo, who would later direct the music video for "Like It" from her Walk of My Life studio album. The setting for the video was to introduce the viewer to Koda Kumi's hotel and the resort's small staff. The video contained a dual theme of day versus night, showing the personas most people carry during the day - very prim and proper - while, during the night, their inner selves come out.

"Money In My Bag" was also directed by Kanji Sudo. The video was centered around night and was a hip-hop-infused dance number, choreographed by FUKO, a dancer who has been with Kumi since her 2006 album Black Cherry. The music video was only available on the fan club editions of the single, which omitted the video for "Hotel."

== Track list ==
CD
No.	Title	Lyrics	Music	Length
1.	"Introduction ~Check In~"	UTA • SUNNY	UTA	0:42
2.	"Hotel"	Koda Kumi	H.U.B • Didrik Thott • Sebastian Thott • Ylva Dimburg	3:22
3.	"Interlude ~Secret Room~"	UTA • SUNNY	UTA	0:32
4.	"Money In My Bag"	Koda Kumi	Bardur Haberg • Hayden Bell • Sarah Lundback Bell • Ylva Dimburg	2:34
5.	"Interlude ~Last Night Dream~"	UTA • SUNNY	UTA	0:37
6.	"Turn Around"	Koda Kumi	Atsushi Shimada • Raay • Marjetka Vovk	4:12
Total length:				10:79

DVD
No.	Title	Producer(s)	Length
1.	"Hotel" (Music Video)	Kanji Sudo • Makoto Okuguchi	3:27
2.	"Hotel" (Making Video)	Kanji Sudo • Makoto Okuguchi	3:26
3.	"Money In My Bag" (TV Spot)		:018
Total length:			6:27

Fan Club CD
No.	Title	Lyrics	Music	Length
1.	"Introduction ~Check In~"	UTA • SUNNY	UTA	0:42
2.	"Hotel"	Koda Kumi	H.U.B • Didrik Thott • Sebastian Thott • Ylva Dimburg	3:22
3.	"Interlude ~Secret Room~"	UTA • SUNNY	UTA	0:32
4.	"Money In My Bag"	Koda Kumi	Bardur Haberg • Hayden Bell • Sarah Lundback Bell • Ylva Dimburg	2:34
5.	"Interlude ~Last Night Dream~"	UTA • SUNNY	UTA	0:37
6.	"Turn Around"	Koda Kumi	Atsushi Shimada • Raay • Marjetka Vovk	4:12
Total length:				10:79

Fan Club DVD
No.	Title	Producer(s)	Length
1.	"Money In My Bag" (Music Video)	Kanji Sudo • Makoto Okuguchi	2:40
2.	"Money In My Bag" (Making Video)	Kanji Sudo • Makoto Okuguchi	2:40
3.	"Hotel" (TV Spot)		:018
Total length:			5:38

== Charts ==
Weekly charts
Chart (2014)	Peak position
Japan Singles (Oricon)	7
Japan (Japan Hot 100)	23
Taiwan East Asia Albums (G-Music)	10

== Alternate versions ==
Hotel

1. "Hotel": Found on the single and corresponding album Walk of My Life (2015)
2. "Hotel" [Plastik Funk Remix]: Found on Koda Kumi Driving Hit's 7 (2017)

Money in My Bag

1. "Money in My Bag": Found on the single and corresponding album Walk of My Life (2015)
2. "Money in My Bag" [Starfvckers Remix]: Found on Koda Kumi Driving Hit's 7 (2017)
