= Koishikute (Koda Kumi song) =

"Koishikute 恋しくて"

Single by Koda Kumi

from the album Bon Voyage
- B-side: "Alone"
- Released: December 26, 2012
- Recorded: 2012
- Length: 10:19
- Label: Rhythm Zone
- Songwriters: Koda Kumi, Mayo Okamoto

Koda Kumi singles chronology
"Go to the top" (2012)	"Koishikute 恋しくて" (2012)	"Summer Trip" (2013)

Music video
- "Koishikute" on YouTube

Koishikute (恋しくて / Yearn for You) is the 54th single by Japanese singer-songwriter Koda Kumi, released on December 26, 2012, pushed back from the original release date of December 5, 2012. The single debuted No. 4 on the Oricon Daily Charts, took No. 7 for the week and remained on the charted for six weeks. The single peaked at number 8 on the Billboard Japan Hot 100, her fifth highest charting single of the 2010s decade.

== Information ==
Koishikute is Japanese R&B-turned-pop singer Koda Kumi's fifty-fourth single under the Avex sub-label Rhythm Zone. Initially, the song was to be released in early December, but was pushed back and released later that month. The single peaked at No. 4 on the Oricon Daily charts and took No. 7 for the weekly ranking. It remained on the charts for six consecutive weeks.

The coupling track "Alone" was a cover of the song originally sung by Mayo Okamoto in 1996, making it the first time Koda Kumi has had a single with both a ballad for the a-side and the b-side since her release of "hands" in 2005. Alone was later released on her second cover album Color the Cover.

"Koishikute" was certified gold for 100,000 downloads in January 2014.

== Packaging ==
The single was released in three editions:

- CD: contains two songs.
- CD+DVD: contains two songs, music video and making video.
- Playbutton+Goods: contains one song, shopping bag and a sports towel.

The playbutton+goods edition came with the single mp3 in a button, a shopping bag and a towel with Koda Kumi's official fan club logo.

== Promotions ==
The single was promoted as being as intense and with a similar message to one of her more famous ballads, "Ai no Uta" (2007). On her official Facebook, the banner that was posted compared "Ai no Uta" to "Koishikute."

== Track listing ==
CD
No.	Title	Lyrics	Music	Arranger(s)	Length
1.	"Koishikute" (恋しくて / Yearn for You)	Koda Kumi	M.I • Jam9	Masaki Iehara	5:11
2.	"Alone"	Mayo Okamoto	Mayo Okamoto	Makoto Minagawa	5:08
Total length:					10:09

DVD
No.	Title	Length
1.	"Koishikute" (Music Video)	5:29
2.	"Koishikute" (Making Video)

== Oricon sales chart (Japan) ==
Release	Chart	Peak position	First day/week sales	Sales total
December 26, 2012	Oricon Daily Charts	4		
December 26, 2012	Oricon Weekly Charts	7	18,540	23,183
December 26, 2012	Oricon Monthly Charts	27	21,901	

== Alternate versions ==
Koishikute

1. Koishikute: Found on the single (2012) and corresponding album Bon Voyage (2014)
2. Koishikute [Dirt $outh (RE:LABEL®) Remix]: Found on Koda Kumi Driving Hit's 5 (2013)

Alone

1. Alone: Found on the single (2012) and album Color the Cover (2013)
2. Alone [Prog5 Classic Remix]: Found on Koda Kumi Driving Hit's 5 (2013)
