= Jam 9 =

Japanese band

Jam9
- Also known as: Fan-mon
- Origin: Hamamatsu, Shizuoka, Japan
- Genres: Hip hop, pop
- Years active: 2003–present
- Label: Dreamusic Incorporated
- Members: Giz 'Mo; Mocky; Prince.YK
- Website: jam9-net.com

Jam9 is a Japanese band formed in 2003 and currently signed with the record company Dreamusic, Inc. It is based in Hamamatsu. Their music is mostly hip-hop. They began by playing at local music bars and released several records independently before signing with Dreamusic. Their first album with a major label, Kizuna (2011), reached number 77 on the Oricon album chart. In 2009, a song from their indie album, Rookie Players, served as a tie-in song for the J League team Shimizu S-Pulse's summer home game events.

== Members ==
- Giz 'Mo (ギズモ) – MC
- Prince.YK (プリンス・ワイケー) – MC
- Mocky (モッキー) – DJ
