= Hands (Koda Kumi song) =

Single by Koda Kumi

from the album Secret
- B-side: "Through the Sky"
- Released: January 19, 2005
- Recorded: 2004
- Genre: R&B
- Length: 20:01
- Label: Rhythm Zone
- Songwriter: Koda Kumi
- Producer: Katsumi Ohnishi

Koda Kumi singles chronology
"Kiseki" (2004)	"Hands" (2005)	"Hot Stuff" (2005)

Music video
- "Hands" on YouTube

"Hands" (stylized in lowercase) is a song recorded by Japanese singer-songwriter Koda Kumi. It was released on January 19, 2005, and served as her 14th single under Rhythm Zone. The single peaked at number seven on the Oricon Singles Chart and remained on the charts for eight weeks.

== Background and release ==
"Hands" is Japanese singer-songwriter Kumi Koda's fourteenth single. It charted low in the top ten at No. 7 on the Oricon charts and remained on the charts for two months. The single became her third to be released as both CD and CD+DVD. It was the end theme of ANB's television program Uchimura Produce (内村プロデュース / Uchimura PURODYUUSI). The B-side, "Through the Sky", was the end theme of Nippon TV's informational program The Sunday (THE・サンデー) through the month of January.

The music video released on the single differed from the music video released on the corresponding album, Secret, which contained an "album version" that held different scenes. The "single version" was, however, placed on her first compilation album, Best: First Things. A remix version titled "Hands (The Standard Club Remix)" was included on the singer's remix album Koda Kumi Driving Hit's 2 in 2010.

== Music video ==
The music video for "Hands" carried a theme of a woman trying to cope with her depression brought on by being in the spotlight and having everyone focused on her. An alternate version to the video was placed on the corresponding album, secret. This would make it the first time she released an "alternate version" of a music video. The "album version" featured different scenes, but still kept the camera close for a more intimate feeling.

== Track list ==
CD
No.	Title	Lyrics	Music	Arranger(s)	Length
1.	"hands"	Koda Kumi	Katsumi Ohnishi	H-Wonder	4:28
2.	"Through the sky"	Koda Kumi • Hiroo Yamaguchi	Hiroo Yamaguchi	H-Wonder	5:33
3.	"hands [Instrumental]"		Katsumi Ohnishi	H-Wonder	4:28
4.	"Through the sky [Instrumental]"		Hiroo Yamaguchi	H-Wonder	5:30

DVD
No.	Title	Director(s)	Length
1.	"hands" (Music Video)	Ippe ~ Morita • Sumitaka Fushimizu	4:28
2.	"hands" (Making Video)	Ippe ~ Morita • Sumitaka Fushimizu
