= Crazy 4 U =

Single by Koda Kumi

from the album Feel My Mind
- Released: January 15, 2004 (JP)
- Recorded: 2003
- Genre: J-Pop, dance-pop
- Length: 22:43
- Label: Rhythm Zone; RZCD-45113 (Japan, CD)
- Songwriter(s): Miki Watabe

Koda Kumi singles chronology
"Gentle Words" (2003)	"Crazy 4 U" (2004)	"Switch" (2004)

Music video
- "Crazy 4 U" on YouTube

"Crazy 4 U" is singer-songwriter Koda Kumi's 10th domestic solo single. It charted at No. 12 on Oricon and remained on the charts for six weeks.

== Information ==
"Crazy 4 U" is Kumi Koda's tenth single and last single released before her studio album Feel My Mind. It failed to chart in the top ten on Oricon, coming it at No. 12. Despite its low ranking, it remained on the charts for six weeks.

The single contained one B-side, "Yume with You" (夢 with You / Dream with You), which was a cover of the same song originally performed by Toshinobu Kubota in 1993. It also contained a remix of the title track. This was also the single that kick-started the ero-kawaii craze that Kumi became synonymous with, and that spread across teens and young adults in Japan. Crazy 4 U became a milestone in Kumi's growth as an artist, with her enjoying the theme and beginning to choose the songs she would perform.

"Crazy 4 U" was the opening theme of the Japanese anime series Gilgamesh.

The corresponding music video was released on Koda Kumi's DVD feel..., and later on her first compilation album, Best ~first things~. In 2006, a dance version was released on her compilation album Best ~Bounce & Lovers~.

== Music video ==
The music video for "Crazy 4 U" was not coupled with the single, but was placed on the corresponding DVD to feel my mind, feel....

The music video had an espionage theme, with Kumi acting as an agent to track down a smuggler. Throughout the video, she attempts to locate the smuggler, meeting an innocent party girl in the process, who winds up involved unknowingly.

"Crazy 4 U" was later released as a dance version on her third compilation album Best ~Bounce & Lovers~. This version would only harbor the scene in the parking garage.

== Background narration ==
"The moment I first ran into Crazy 4 U, I felt: 'This is the song that will symbolize Koda Kumi!!'... I started selecting songs personally." – Koda Kumi

This was the first song and video that Koda Kumi took the reins to – from what she would wear, to the music and lyrics. She aimed for something that artists before her had never performed in mainstream music and wanted to provide entertainment that only she could. Koda Kumi speaks in KODA REKI about how, until this point in her career, she had enthusiasm, but no clear goal. She started to enjoy the fact that she was doing what she loved and it showed in her music.

== Track listing ==
CD
No.	Title	Writer(s)	Arranger(s)	Length
1.	"Crazy 4 U"	Miki Watabe	Miki Watabe	4:08
2.	"Yume with You" (夢 with You/Dream with You)	Toshinobu Kubota	Akira	3:49
3.	"Crazy 4 U (Akakage's Crazy Love Remix)"			6:51
4.	"Crazy 4 U" (Instrumental)			4:08
5.	"Yume with You" (Instrumental)			3:49
Total length:				22:05

== Chart history ==
Peak position: #12

=== Sales ===
Initial week estimate: 11,919
Total estimate: 28,272

== Alternate versions ==
Crazy 4 U

1. "Crazy 4 U": found on the single (2003) and corresponding album Feel My Mind (2004)
2. "Crazy 4 U (Akakage's Crazy Love Remix)": found on the single (2003)
3. "Crazy 4 U (Instrumental)": found on the single (2003)
4. "Crazy 4 U (80's Style Remix)": found on 俄然パラパラ!! Presents Super J-Euro Best (2005)
5. '"Crazy 4 U (World Sketch Remix)": found on Koda Kumi Driving Hit's (2009)

Yume with You

1. "Yume with You": found on the single (2003)
2. "Yume with You (Instrumental)": found on the single (2003)
3. "Yume with You (R. Yamaki's Groove Mix)": found on album feel my mind (2004)
