= Summer Trip =

Single by Koda Kumi

from the album Bon Voyage
- Released: July 31, 2013
- Recorded: 2013
- Genre: J-pop; R&B; hip hop
- Length: 70:44
- Label: Rhythm Zone
- Songwriter(s): Koda Kumi

Koda Kumi singles chronology
"Koishikute" (2012)	"Summer Trip" (2013)	"Dreaming Now!" (2013)

"Summer Trip" is the fifty-fifth single by singer-songwriter Koda Kumi. The single is a double a-side and contains one b-side. It debuted at No. 7 on the Oricon Daily chart.

The single's music videos and artwork were shot in California, with the cover and booklet art being taken in Malibu. The video for "Touch Down" was filmed in Los Angeles, while "LALALALALA" was filmed at Venice Beach. Both videos were produced by famed videographer Fatima Robinson.

== Background information ==
Summer Trip is Japanese artist Koda Kumi's fifty-fifth single under the Avex sub-label Rhythm Zone. The single charted at No. 7 on the Oricon Singles Charts, coming in behind CNBLUE's "lady" single and DAIGO's "Itsumo Dakishimete/Mugen∞Rebirth" for a spot in the top five. However, it jumped to take No. 5 on the second day and took No. 6 on the weekly charts.

Summer Trip contains two a-sides, "Touch Down" and "LALALALALA." "Touch Down" is a hip-hop track written by famous music producer Toby Gad, who is best well known for his works with John Legend, Fergie and Beyoncé. The song was originally produced by Toby for American singer-songwriter JoJo, and was intended to be for her then-titled 2012 album Jumping Trains. The singer had recorded the song under the name "Touch Down (Flippers Up)"; however, it was never released. Instead, Avex picked up the song rights and it was passed to Kumi, who then modified the lyrics for a Japan release. Summer Trip's other a-side, "LALALALALA," was more upbeat, carrying elements of pop and rock. The song was written by Swedish writers Figge Brostrom and Anna Engh.

The b-side, "Is This Trap?", is an electronica track, accompanied by synth-pop. The song was co-written by Swedish producers Henrik Nordenback and Christian Fast, and Japanese producer T-SK, both who are members of the world creator team "FUTURE UNISON," which was created by HiDE Kawada.

The single's cover art and images used in the booklet were taken in the beach city of Malibu.

== Music video ==
Summer Trip contained two music videos for the two a-sides, "Touch Down" and "LALALALALA." The videos were filmed in California in the United States. Both were shot and directed by music video director and choreographer Fatima Robinson. Robinson is famous for her works with Michael Jackson, Aaliyah and Mary J. Blige. She has also worked with The Black Eyed Peas and with Fergie's solo projects.

"Touch Down" was filmed in Los Angeles and was shot with low lighting. The video featured one dancer and Kumi sporting several fashions, including a crop top with black shorts and gold chains and a bustier with tight-fitting leggings.

"LALALALALA" was filmed in Venice Beach. The video showed off many cultures and styles that are brought together at the beach in California. The theme of the video was how everyone would get together to have "the best days of their live" and how all cultures could coexist.

== Track listing ==
CD
No.	Title	Lyrics	Music	Length
1.	"Radio Show Start ~LALALALALA~" (Intro)		Bana a.k.a. Daddy B	1:01
2.	"LALALALALA"	Koda Kumi	Figge Brostrom; Anna Engh	3:37
3.	"Show Time ~Is This Trap?~" (Interlude)		Bana a.k.a. Daddy B	1:01
4.	"Is This Trap?"	Koda Kumi	T-SK; HENRIK Nordenback; Christian Fast	3:53
5.	"Show Time ~Touch Down~" (Interlude)		Bana a.k.a. Daddy B	1:10
6.	"Touch Down"	Koda Kumi; Toby Gad; Joanna "JoJo" Levesque	Toby Gad	3:44
7.	"Radio Show End" (Outro)		Bana a.k.a. Daddy B	1:00
Total length:				15:19

DVD
No.	Title	Music	Producer(s)	Length
1.	"Touch Down" (Music Video)	Fatima Robinson	Akihiro Kubo; Takuma Hayashi; Nina Grassman-Warner	3:45
2.	"LALALALALA" (Music Video)	Fatima Robinson	Akihiro Kubo; Takuma Hayashi; Nina Grassman-Warner	3:34
3.	"Summer Trip" (Making Video)	Kentaro Ishiyama	Akihiro Kubo	18:06
Total length:				25:25

== Alternate versions ==
Lalalalala'

1. Lalalalala: Found on the single (2013) and corresponding album Bon Voyage (2014)
2. Lalalalala [ELMER VoVo Remix]: Found on Koda Kumi Driving Hit's 6 (2014)

Is This Trap?

1. Is This Trap?: Found on the single (2013)
2. Is This Trap? [Jumping Dog Remix]: Found on Koda Kumi Driving Hit's 6 (2014)

Touch Down

1. Touch Down: Found on the single (2013) and corresponding album Bon Voyage (2014)
2. Touch Down [736 Remix]: Found on Koda Kumi Driving Hit's 6 (2014)
