= Kiseki (Koda Kumi song) =

"Kiseki 奇跡"

Single by Koda Kumi

from the album Secret
- B-side: Love Holic; life
- Released: September 8, 2004 (JP)
- Genre: R&B
- Length: 27:25
- Label: Rhythm Zone; RZCD-45141/B (Japan, CD+DVD); RZCD-45142 (Japan, CD5")
- Songwriters: Koda Kumi, Morimoto Kosuke

Koda Kumi singles chronology
"Chase" (2004)	"Kiseki 奇跡" (2004)	"Hands" (2005)

Music video
- "Kiseki" on YouTube

"Kiseki" (奇跡 / Miracle) is the thirteenth domestic single by Japanese singer-songwriter Koda Kumi. It was released on September 8, 2004, as the third single from her fourth studio album Secret (2005). The song reached No. 7 on Oricon and stayed on the charts for ten weeks.

== Information ==
"Kiseki" peaked in the top ten on Oricon, coming in at No. 7, and remained on the charts for ten weeks. The single became Koda's second single to be released in both CD and CD+DVD formats, her first being Love & Honey. The CD only version was of limited release, while the CD+DVD edition received a wider release through various retailers.

Koda helped write the lyrics to both "Kiseki" and "life". "Love Holic" became the first song for which Koda herself wrote the full lyrics, not collaborating with another lyricist. The title track was a power ballad, with the accompanying b-sides being upbeat pop songs.

== Promotional advertisements ==
"Kiseki" was used as the theme of NHK's television program J-League (Jリーグ / J-RIIGU).

"Love Holic" (stylized as "LOVE HOLIC") was the ending theme of TBS' television program World Crunchy☆Value (世界バリバリ☆バリュー / Sekai Bari Bari☆BARYUU).

== Track list ==
(Source)

CD
No.	Title	Lyrics	Music	Arranger(s)	Length
1.	"Kiseki" (奇跡 / Miracle)	Koda Kumi • Morimoto Kosuke	Morimoto Kosuke	Nishikawa Reo	5:02
2.	"Love Holic"	Koda Kumi	Yamasaki Tsutomu	h-wonder	4:27
3.	"life"	Koda Kumi • Kim Hiroshi	Kim Hiroshi	Nishikawa Reo	4:14
4.	"Kiseki" (Instrumental)		Morimoto Kosuke	Nishikawa Reo	5:01
5.	"Love Holic" (Instrumental)		Yamasaki Tsutomu	h-wonder	4:27
6.	"life" (Instrumental)		Kim Hiroshi	Nishikawa Reo	4:12

DVD
No.	Title	Producer/Director(s)	Length
1.	"Kiseki" (Music Video)	Kazayuki Takaba • Shinozuka Masaki
2.	"Kiseki" (Making Video)	Kazayuki Takaba • Shinozuka Masaki

== Charts ==
Oricon Sales Chart (Japan)

Release	Chart	Peak position	First week sales	Sales total	Chart run
September 8, 2004	Oricon Daily Singles Chart	7			
September 8, 2004	Oricon Weekly Singles Chart	7	28,509	60,033	10

- Total Sales : 60,033 (Japan)

== Alternate versions ==
Kiseki

1. Kiseki: Found on the single (2004) and corresponding album secret (2005)
2. Kiseki [Instrumental]: Found on the single (2004)
3. Kiseki [GTS SH Club Remix]: Found on Koda Kumi Driving Hit's 4 (2012)
