= Gentle Words =

Single by Koda Kumi

from the album Feel My Mind
- Released: December 10, 2003
- Recorded: 2003
- Genre: J-pop; R&B
- Length: 26:19
- Label: Rhythm Zone
- Songwriter(s): Koda Kumi; Daisuke Imai; Jun Natsume
- Producer(s): Daisuke Imai; Takashi Tsushimi

Koda Kumi singles chronology
"Come with Me" (2003)	"Gentle Words" (2003)	"Crazy 4 U" (2004)

Music video
- "Gentle Words" on YouTube

Gentle Words is Japanese singer-songwriter Koda Kumi's ninth domestic solo single. The single charted at No. 15 on Oricon and stayed on the charts for ten weeks. The b-side "Saigo no Ame" (最後の雨 / Last Rain) is a cover of Yasushi Nakanishi's song of the same name.

== Background and release ==
Gentle Words is Japanese singer-songwriter Koda Kumi's ninth domestic single under the avex sub-label Rhythm Zone. The single peaked low on the Oricon Singles Charts at No. 15, and remained on the chart for ten consecutive weeks. Despite coming off of the success of "Real Emotion/1000 no Kotoba", both this single and her last single, "Come with Me", failed to break the top ten. The single did have one b-side, "Saigo no Ame," which was a cover of the song originally released by Yasushi Nakanishi in 1992.

Due to the low chart ranking of the single and its predecessor, "Come with Me", Koda Kumi fell into a depression, feeling as though she was unable to create a song without a famous composer's help. However, she began to turn her frame of mind around, believing that when she finally made it, people wouldn't think she made it just because of a tie-in, but instead, because she was in the song. She then decided that she would continue and not let anything hold her back. Koda stated that "I vowed to myself to continue to run towards my dream."

== Usage in media ==
"Gentle Words" was used in the advertisement for SATO Healthcare's sinus gel Stona.

== Track listing ==
CD
No.	Title	Lyrics	Music	Arranger(s)	Length
1.	"Gentle Words"	Koda Kumi	D.A.I	H-Wonder
2.	"Without Your Love"	Koda Kumi, Daisuke Imai	Daisuke Imai	Daisuke Imai
3.	"Saigo no Ame (最後の雨; Last Rain)"	Jun Natsume	Akira	Tsushimi Takashi
4.	"Gentle Words" (Instrumental)		DAI	H-Wonder
5.	"Without Your Love" (Instrumental)		Daisuke Imai	Daisuke Imai
6.	"Saigo no Ame" (Instrumental)		Akira	Tsushimi Takashi

== Sales ==
Initial week estimate: 9,531
Total estimate: 27,164
