= Live Tour 2008: Kingdom =

Video by Koda Kumi
- Released: 24 September 2008 (DVD); 18 May 2011 (Blu-ray); 20 March 2013 (rental live CD)
- Recorded: 2008
- Genres: Pop, R&B, J-pop, dance-pop
- Label: Rhythm Zone
- Producer: Koda Kumi

Koda Kumi chronology
| Live Tour 2007: Black Cherry (2007) | Live Tour 2008: Kingdom (2008) | Fan Club Event 2008: Let's Party Vol. 1 (2009) |

Live Tour 2008: Kingdom (stylized as Live Tour 2008 ～Kingdom～), is Koda Kumi's eighth concert video. It reached No. 2 on Oricon Live charts and charted for twenty-five weeks, selling 88,505 copies during 2008. First press edition came with a sleeve case.

== Information ==
Live Tour 2008 ~Kingdom~ is Japanese singer-songwriter Kumi Koda's ninth DVD and fifth concert tour DVD release. While it charted at No. 1 on the Oricon Live charts upon its debut, it dropped to take the No. 2 spot for the weekly ranking; however, it still charted for twenty-five weeks.

The DVD was released as both a single and a 2DVD combo. The latter was of a limited edition and included special bonus footage. The footage featured the behind-the-scenes making of the tour, along with a tour digest and a special encore, in which fans had to find Kumi.

First press editions came with a slip cover with differing cover art than those released without.

The concert tour performed for the live DVD was done on 17 May 2008 at Yoyogi National Gymnasium, which is located in Yoyogi Park in Tokyo, Japan.

== Post controversy and apprehension ==
Between the release of Koda Kumi's studio album Kingdom and the first day of the concert, Koda Kumi had fear and anxiety over performing on stage after her statement on All Night Nippon on 31 January of that year.

On that date, she had made a lighthearted comment after being asked by the radio host her opinion on her manager getting married and the prospect of having children. Kumi had responded, "When women turn 35, their amniotic fluid goes rotten, so I hope they have a child before then." The comment caused immediate backlash due to the low pregnancy rates in Japan and the sensitivity of the subject among Japanese women. Due to this, upon Kumi request, all promotions for the album had been pulled on 2 February and a letter of apology was posted on Kumi's official site in lieu of the normal content.

Kumi had made a public apology on FNN Supernews, saying how she deeply regretted hurting thousands of Japanese women and mothers.

In Kumi's self-published biography, KODA REKI, she admitted how she had cancelled several rehearsals for the tour due to the severe anxiety she would get when she believed that she would walk out onto the stage to perform, only to have an empty arena.

== Track listing ==
(Official Track List)

=== DVD1 ===
0. "Opening Movie"

1. "Under"
2. "Freaky"
3. "Cutie Honey"
4. "Himitsu"
5. "More"
6. "Last Angel"
  <Interlude Movie 1>
7. "Ai no Uta"
8. "hands"
9. "Someday"
10. "Yume no Uta"
11. "Song Menu: you"
12. "Kiseki"
13. "Wind"
  <Interlude Movie 2>
14. "Wonderland"
15. "It's a Small World"
16. "Koi no Mahou"
17. "anytime"
18. "Run For Your Life"
19. "Come Over"
20. "girls"
  Encore
21. "Single Medley"
  "Shake It Up / BUT / real Emotion / Butterfly / Crazy 4 U / Dance Battle"
22. "Moon Crying"
23. "walk"

=== DVD2: Bonus Pictures ===
1. Behind-the-Scenes and Making of the Tour
  Six Faces of Koda Kumi"
  The Backstage Documentary of Koda Kumi
2. Song Menu Digest Video
3. Encore "Find Kuu-chan" at Each Concert Digest Video
