= Live Tour 2007: Black Cherry =

Live Tour 2007 ~Black Cherry~ Special Final at Tokyo Dome

Video by Koda Kumi
- Released: 3 March 2008
- Recorded: 2007
- Genre: Pop, R&B, J-pop, dance-pop, rock
- Label: Rhythm Zone
- Producer: Koda Kumi

Koda Kumi chronology
Koda Kumi Live Tour 2006–2007 Second Session (2007)	Live Tour 2007; ~Black Cherry~; Special Final at Tokyo Dome (2008)	Live Tour 2008: Kingdom (2008)

Live Tour 2007 ~Black Cherry~ Special Final in Tokyo Dome (stylized as Live Tour 2007 ~Black Cherry~ SPECIAL FINAL in Tokyo Dome), is Koda Kumi's seventh concert video. It reached No. 1 on the Oricon DVD charts and remained on the charts for twenty-four weeks. It sold a total of 105,712 copies in 2008.

== Information ==
Live Tour 2007 ~Black Cherry~ Special Final in Tokyo Dome is Japanese singer-songwriter Kumi Koda's seventh concert DVD. As with her previous concert video releases, Live Tour 2007 ~Black Cherry~ charted at No. 1 on the Oricon Live charts. It remained on the charts for six months. As of 2008, the DVD has sold 105,712.

The tour became Kumi's first to take control over, helping to create and style the outfits worn, choosing the track list and helping to choreograph some of the performances. However, as with many of the dances performed in her music videos, most of the choreography was composed by MAIKO for the females and U★G for the males.

This also became Kumi's first tour to have a focus on a story, something she would continue to do for her following tours, including Live Tour 2008 ~Kingdom~ and Live Tour 2009 ~Trick~. The story for her Black Cherry tour was of a sea captain (Kumi) and her crew (the female dancers) being on a voyage to obtain a key from a captain of a different pirate ship. The key opens a treasure chest, which is what her crew tries to locate throughout the concert.

During the tour, she performed "I Feel Love" with Blue Man Group. The song is a cover of Donna Summer's 1977 song of the same name. Kumi performed the song with Blue Man Group again during their The Complex Rock Tour Live tour in Tokyo in summer of 2007.

== Guest stars ==
Live Tour 2007 ~Black Cherry~ Special Final in Tokyo Dome featured a few guest stars, including some Kumi had not released a collaborative song with prior.

South Korean group TVXQ (known as Tohoshinki in Japan) performed in the concert for the song "Last Angel," which was released during the era for her album Kingdom. The single was released in November 2007, during which Kumi's Black Cherry tour was still on-going. Kumi would later perform the song with TVXQ during their 3rd Live Tour 2008 ~T~ concert.

Manhattan performance art trio Blue Man Group performed in the concert for the song "I Feel Love." The trio had originally covered the song in 2003 on their album The Complex. The album version had featured Venus Hum singer Annette Strean. Kumi would perform with Blue Man Group again during their Complex Rock Tour in Tokyo in the same year.

== Reception ==
Many fans outside of Japan, upon seeing the concert either live or via DVD, claimed that Live Tour 2007 ~Black Cherry~ was Kumi's "most stunning" and "most visually entertaining tour." They also praised the story-theme of the tour and how the video cut scenes helping create a narrative even non-Japanese speakers were able to follow. black_butterfly praised the concert for its energy and feature of guests, including Blue Man Group and South Korean group TVXQ.

== Track list ==
=== DVD1 ===
0. (Opening Movie)

1. "Black Cherry"
2. "Get Up & Move!!"
3. "Cherry Girl"
4. "Cutie Honey" (Live Version)
5. "Tsuki to Taiyou"
6. "Yume no Uta"
7. "Heat feat. MEGARYU"
8. "Break It Down"
  (Interlude Movie 1)
9. "Candle Light"
10. "Unmei"
11. "Milk Tea"
12. "Koi no Tsubomi"
13. "Twinkle"
  (Interlude Movie 2)
14. "Ningyo-Hime"
15. "Freaky"
16. "real Emotion"
17. "Last Angel feat. Tohoshinki"
18. "Butterfly"
19. "Puppy"
20. "I'll be there"
21. "Go Way!!"
22. "With your smile"

=== DVD2: Encore and Bonus Footage ===
1. "I Feel Love feat. Blue Man Group"
2. "Love Holic / Chase / Come Over"
3. "Cutie Honey"
4. "Taisetsu na Kimi e"
  (Encore)
5. "Take Back"
6. "Come With Me"
7. "BUT"
8. "Ai no Uta"
9. "Wind"
10. "walk"
11. "Making Video"
12. "Twinkle [Koda Kumi Solo Version]" (Music Video)
