= Cherry Girl =

- Directed by: Shuta Takahata
- Written by: Osamu Suzuki
- Produced by: Max Matsuura; Chiba Ryuhei; Araki Takashi; Hayashi Shinji; Nagata Yoshihisa; Andrew Caporale
- Starring: Kumi Koda; MEGUMI; Yuko Ito
- Music by: Kumi Koda
- Distributed by: Rhythm Zone; Avex Entertainment
- Release date: December 20, 2006
- Country: Japan
- Language: Japanese

Cherry Girl is a Japanese action drama film featuring Japanese singer-songwriter Kumi Koda and actresses MEGUMI and Yuko Ito. It was directed by Shuta Takahata (The Hotel Venus) and is written by Osamu Suzuki (Love Com, Hito Ni Yasashiku and smaSTATION). The film was scored by Koda Kumi's studio album Black Cherry and was featured on the second DVD of the album.

Kumi Koda, the main focus of the film, released a music video centered around the film's theme on her Cherry Girl/Unmei single.

== Plot ==
Cherry Girl centers around three female bartenders, who use the bar to run a private detective agency. Kumi (Koda Kumi), Meg (MEGUMI) and Yu (Yuko Ito) play agents who work as private investigators for an unseen man named Goro (Goro Inagaki). He contacts the three women via Vodafone cell phone to give them job orders.

The film opens with a bar scene of the women serving their customers, alongside a conversation Kumi, Yu and Meg are having, talking about past love interests. Kumi tells them that during one of her relationships, she had found a hair in the man's bed, which did not belong to her, and broke up with the man a week later. The scene is played back-to-back with the bar scene and an action scene of the trio. Meg alerts the other two of a suspicious character entering the bar, who they find had a pocket knife.

Later, as the women are getting massages, Goro gives the trio a job order by a woman named Mari, played by Mari Hoshino, who believes her fiancé, M. Hotta (Jai West), is having affairs with multiple people, and wants the women to get him to stop the affairs before they are married. She says how she is mainly suspicious of Hotta's secretary, Rie Fumiko (Ishida Hiroyasu).

Kumi watches Hotta and Rie exit an office building, relaying the information to Meg and Yu. She sends a picture via cellphone as Hotta sits in the back seat and Rie takes a seat in the front. She takes on several disguises as she follows the duo, failing to come up with evidence of him cheating. Failing to gain any information over the course of a week, the trio discusses the case, now believing Hotta to be "perfect." Still wanting to please their customer, the trio decide to crash a party Hotta will be attending, which hosts many celebrities.

Kumi and Yu stake out the event and see Hotta enter with Rie. Kumi begins a conversation with Hotta, during which Yu bumps into him and drops her hand bag. As she and Hotta exchange apologies, she takes the opportunity to swipe his cell phone and his wallet. Afterwards, Kumi meets Takeda (Shinji Takeda). Once the trio return to the bar, Kumi tells Meg and Yu that it was "love at first sight" and he gave her a token to remember him. The other women are skeptical, but Kumi defends her feelings. Goro then calls, asking if there has been any success with Mari's investigation, to which they admit they have not found anything. Before he hangs up, Kumi asks him what he thinks about true love, where he tells her that a meeting is controlled by destiny. It is then revealed that Kumi had met Goro when she had a private investigator (Lou Oshiba) investigate a past love interest. When the P.I rejected her, not believing her boyfriend to be having an affair, Goro overheard and offered her information and a job opportunity.

Afterwards, Kumi sees Mari and Takeda out in public together and Meg is curious as to why Takeda, Hotta's vice president, would take Mari to Hotta's office. After the trio discover Mari and Takeda are trying take over the company, they talk to Hotta, who asks them to find the truth to save his company. When they break into Hotta's office, they find Takeda and Mari. Mari tries to escape, but Yu stops her and mocks the fact that Mari thought her manipulation would work. The trio fight Takeda and, after he falls, Mari places herself over him to protect him. She explains that, as Hotta's company grew, Takeda was pushed off to the side, so she tried to frame Hotta as having multiple lovers so he would have to give up the company due to bad publicity. Kumi tells her that, by manipulating both Hotta and Takeda, she is hurting Takeda and it would be best to tell the truth.

The film then shows the trio at their bar, discussing the revelations made about Mari betraying Hotta, and Goro congratulates them on a job well done. After they say goodbye, the trio talk about the job and Goro. As they talk, a scene is shown where Rie Fumiko runs into Goro, with him only recognizing her after she has walked away. It is learned that Hotta knew the girls were following him and of the tracking devices they were using to target him due to his secretary relaying the information to him each time. As it had turned out, everyone, sans the trio and Goro, was in the scheme. Hotta calls Takeda and tells him how everything worked out, while Mari smiles in the background. They had set Kumi, Yu and Meg up and, while they were in Hotta's office fighting Takeda, an explosive was placed in their vehicle, which exploded as they approached.

== Cast ==
- Koda Kumi as Kumi, one of the investigators who works for Goro. She tends to make judgements based on how she feels, rather than logic.
- MEGUMI as Meg, one of the investigators who works for Goro. She is usually the one to give Kumi the hard truth, rather than allow her to live in naïveté.
- Yuko Ito as Yu, one of the investigators who works for Goro. She is quiet, but also the most technologically advanced of the trio, being able to hack multiple types of systems.
- Goro Inagaki as Goro, the boss. He is the one who gives Kumi, Meg and Yu orders and the one who accepts the clients the trip investigate.
- Mari Hoshino as Mari, the client Goro accepts and the fiancé of Hotta, the CEO of the Roppungi company.
- Jai West as Hotta, the CEO of the Roppungi company and the fiancé of Mari.
- Ishida Hiroyasu as Rie Fumiko, M. Hotta's secretary and the woman Mari believes he is having an affair with.
- Shinji Takeda as Takeda, the vice president to Hotta's company and the love interest of Kumi.
- Lou Oshiba as the debt collector.
- Mari Hamada as Hamada.

== Soundtrack ==
The film was scored by Koda Kumi's sixth studio album, Black Cherry. The film was released on the second DVD to the album. Kumi worked alongside arrangers and producers Daisuke "D.I" Imai, h-wonder, Octopussy (who most notably worked with Soulhead), alongside others.

Some of the a-sides used in the album were "Juicy", "Cherry Girl" and "Won't Be Long".

=== Black Cherry album ===
1. "Introduction" – Koda Kumi
2. "Get Up & Move!!" – Koda Kumi
3. "Ningyo-Hime" – Koda Kumi
4. "Yume no Uta" – Koda Kumi
5. "Tsuki to Taiyou" – Koda Kumi
6. "Puppy" – Koda Kumi
7. "Koi no Tsubomi" – Koda Kumi
8. "Won't Be Long" (Black Cherry Version) – Koda Kumi x EXILE
9. "Juicy" – Koda Kumi
10. "Candle Light" – Koda Kumi
11. "Cherry Girl" – Koda Kumi
12. "I'll be there" – Koda Kumi
13. "Unmei" – Koda Kumi
14. "With your smile" – Koda Kumi
15. "Milk Tea" – Koda Kumi
16. "Twinkle" (English Version) – Koda Kumi x Show Luo
17. "Go Way!!" – Koda Kumi
18. "Won't Be Long" (Red Cherry Version) – Koda Kumi x EXILE

== Release ==
The film made its debut on Kumi Koda's album Black Cherry around the holiday season on December 20, 2006. It never received a television or theatrical release. The total sales reached over one million.

== Critical reception ==
Cherry Girl received generally positive reviews upon its release from fans. Some fans critiqued the film for being too similar to Charlie's Angels and the hokey acting, while others said it was an "enjoyable flick, though there are no subtitles."
