= Kingdom (Koda Kumi album) =

Studio album by Kumi Koda
- Released: January 30, 2008
- Recorded: 2007–2008
- Genre: Pop; dance; R&B; rock
- Length: 55:42
- Label: Rhythm Zone
- Producer: Kumi Koda

Kumi Koda chronology
Best: Bounce & Lovers (2007)	Kingdom (2008)	Trick (2009)

Singles from Kingdom
- 1. "But/Aishō" Released: March 14, 2007; 2. "Freaky" Released: June 27, 2007; 3. "Ai no Uta" Released: September 12, 2007; 4. "Last Angel" Released: November 7, 2007; 5. "Anytime" Released: January 23, 2008

Professional ratings
Review scores
Source	Rating
AllMusic	3/5 stars

Kingdom is the sixth studio album by Japanese singer-songwriter Kumi Koda. It was released on January 30, 2008, a week after her single anytime. The album debuted at No. 1 on the Oricon Weekly Charts with sales of 421,302. It remained on the charts for thirty-three weeks. The album was released in four editions: CD, CD+DVD, CD+2DVD and CD+2DVD+Poster, with limited editions of all versions carrying the bonus track Black Cherry.

Kingdom has been certified triple platinum by RIAJ for shipment of 750,000 copies in Japan.

== Information ==
Kingdom is Japanese singer-songwriter Koda Kumi's sixth studio album and tenth album overall. It was released on January 30, 2008, a little over a year after her previous studio album, Black Cherry. The album was her fourth consecutive album to claim the No. 1 spot on the Oricon Albums Charts, continuing her streak, which began in early 2005 with her Best ~first things~ album. It contained new material and was her first album to have music videos for every song – including the introduction. She would later do this again for her 2012 album Japonesque.

The album was available in four versions: CD, CD + DVD, CD + 2DVD and a limited edition CD + 2DVD + Poster. The first DVD featured sixteen music videos for each song on the album, including the music video for the non-album song "Run For Your Life." The second DVD was of her Premium Live in Hall in Yokohama Arena concert performed at the Yokohama Arena in Yokohama on June 20, 2007, which was done in part to promote her first pachinko game, Fever Live in Hall.

The CD+2DVD edition contained a slip cover, three stickers of the different album covers and a booklet, which contained photos of the concert. The album's artwork was to symbolize Kumi's popularity in the Japanese music industry at the time, with Kumi donning a crown and sitting on a throne.

== Packaging ==
Kingdom was available in four editions. The CD-only version contains fourteen musical tracks. The CD + DVD contains fourteen musical tracks, fifteen music videos and the live video for Black Cherry, which was performed during her Live Tour 2007 ~Black Cherry~ at Tokyo Dome. CD + 2DVD contains fifteen musical tracks, fifteen music videos with the live video for Black Cherry, her one night show "Premium Limited Live in Hall in Yokohama Arena", which was performed on June 20, 2007, a slipcover for the album and a booklet with images from the one night show.

The CD + 2DVD + Poster version contains fifteen musical tracks, fifteen music videos with the live video for Black Cherry, her one night show "Premium Limited Live in Hall in Yokohama Arena," a booklet with images from the one night show, a slipcover for the album, three stickers of the album covers and a full-sized poster.

The limited editions of all versions contained the bonus track Black Cherry on the CD, which was the full version of the introduction from her last studio album, Black Cherry.

== Controversy and cancelled promotion ==
On January 31, an inflammatory statement by Kumi made on the talk show All Night Nippon created controversy, causing Avex Entertainment (via Koda Kumi's request) to cancel all promotions for Kingdom on February 2. Her website was shut down with a letter from Kumi posted on the page, apologizing for her remark.

During the radio show, Kumi was asked what she thought about her manager's recent marriage, to which she responded lightheartedly, "When women turn 35, their amniotic fluid goes rotten, so I hope they have a child before then." The statement caused backlash due to Japan's low birth rates and the sensitivity of the subject. Due to the statement, she lost promotions for GemCerey, the KOSÉ "Visée" line and Coca-Cola.

Kumi made an appearance on FNN Supernews to apologize for the remark, saying how she deeply regretted hurting thousands of Japanese women and mothers. She also made several public apologies and apologized during her tour for Kingdom. Despite the backlash, the album still reached No. 1 on Oricon.

"I must not pretend like it never happened... The moment I thought, "My dream has finally come true," I destroyed everything with my own words... I realized how immature and unprofessional I was. I stand and speak in front of so many people. I hadn’t thought about the responsibility and power that came with my position."

— Koda Kumi, KODA REKI

In Koda Reki, Kumi's published biography, she said how she still cries when she thinks about the comment and hurting "many Japanese women." She goes on to say how it was that moment in her career when she realized how immature and unprofessional she was, not realizing how many people listened to her words due to her fame. She admitted how she had cancelled several rehearsals for Kingdom's corresponding tour, Live Tour 2008 ~Kingdom~, due to the severe anxiety she would get when she believed that she would walk out onto the stage to perform, only to have an empty arena.

== Music videos ==
The album contained music videos for every song on the CD, including the introduction. It also featured the live version of "Black Cherry," which she performed during her Live Tour 2007 ~Black Cherry~ Special Final in Tokyo Dome. It also featured the non-album music video for "Run For Your Life," which was originally released on her single Freaky in 2007.

Several of the music videos lined up to perform one coherent story line – much as was done during her 12 Singles Collection from her Best ~second session~ era with five of the music videos. Those that lined up where "Koi no Mahou", "Himitsu", "Amai Wana" and "Anata ga shite kurete koto." All four videos contain the same piece of jewelry to signify their connection and story.

The DVD also featured alternate renditions of her music videos "Ai no Uta" and "anytime," both with different scenes not released in their single counterparts. The second DVD featured Kumi's one night show "Premium Live In Hall," which was performed at Yokohama Hall to help promote her first pachinko game, Fever Live in Hall. Koda Kumi would later release another studio album where every track had corresponding music video for her 2012 album Japonesque.

== Track listing ==
Kingdom – Standard edition
No.	Title	Lyrics	Music	Arrangement	Length
1.	"Introduction for Kingdom"	Kumi Koda	Koda Kumi	Mine-chang	1:40
2.	"Last Angel feat. Tohoshinki"	Koda Kumi • H.U.B.	Negin • Hugo Lira • Ian-Paolo Lira • Thomas Gustafsson	Negin • Hugo Lira • Ian-Paolo Lira • Thomas Gustafsson	3:48
3.	"Amai Wana" (甘い罠 / Sweet Trap)	Koda Kumi	HIRO	HIRO	3:58
4.	"Himitsu" (秘密 / Secret)	Koda Kumi	Daisuke "D.I" Imai	Daisuke "D.I" Imai	4:23
5.	"Ai no Uta"	Koda Kumi • Kosuke Morimoto	Kosuke Morimoto	Tomoji Sogawa	4:51
6.	"anytime"	Koda Kumi	Hideya Nakazaki	Hideya Nakazaki	4:09
7.	"Under"	Koda Kumi	Adam Royce; Curtis Richa; Nyticka Henringway	the Beatardz for the Nuchues recording group and The Conglomerate for Axiom Enterprises, Inc.	3:39
8.	"BUT"	Koda Kumi	Tommy Henriksen	Tommy Henriksen	3:37
9.	"Koi no Mahou" (恋の魔法 / Magic of Love)	Koda Kumi	Yuta Nakano	h-wonder	4:32
10.	"Aishou"	Koda Kumi	Reika Yuuki	Masaki Iehara	3:52
11.	"Anata ga Shite Kureta Koto" (あなたがしてくれたこと / What You Did for Me)	Koda Kumi	Daisuke Inoue	Daisuke Inoue	4:11
12.	"Wonderland"	Koda Kumi	Nao Tanaka	Nao Tanaka	3:27
13.	"FREAKY"	Koda Kumi	Henriksen	Henriksen	3:18
14.	"MORE"	Koda	Anna-Maria La Spina; Christopher Lee-Joe; Philippe-Marc Anquetil		3:11
15.	"Black Cherry"	Daisuke "D.I" Imai	Daisuke "D.I" Imai	Daisuke "D.I" Imai	2:59
Total length:					55:42

DVD 1 – music videos
No.	Title	Length
1.	"Introduction for Kingdom"
2.	"anytime [Album Version]" (Music Video)
3.	"FREAKY" (Music Video)
4.	"Under" (Music Video)
5.	"Koi no Mahou" (Music Video)
6.	"Himitsu" (Music Video)
7.	"Ai no Uta [Album Version]" (Music Video)
8.	"MORE" (Music Video)
9.	"Amai Wana" (Music Video)
10.	"Aishou" (Music Video)
11.	"Anata ga Shite Kureta Koto" (Music Video)
12.	"Wonderland" (Music Video)
13.	"Run For Your Life" (Music Video)
14.	"BUT" (Music Video)
15.	"Last Angel feat. Tohoshinki" (Music Video)
16.	"Black Cherry [Live Version]" (from Live Tour 2007 ~Black Cherry~)
17.	"Live DVD Trailer" (from LIVE DVD "Koda Kumi Live Tour 2007 ~Black Cherry~ Special Final in Tokyo Dome")

DVD 2 – Premium Limited Live in Hall in Yokohama Arena
No.	Title	Length
1.	"Cherry Girl"
2.	"BUT"
3.	"Won't Be Long"
4.	"Someday"
5.	"you"
6.	"hands"
7.	"MORE"
8.	"Your Song"
9.	"Koi no Tsubomi" (A Cup of Milk Tea Bossa Nova Version)
10.	"Sweet Love..."
11.	"WIND"
12.	"Encore"

== Charts ==
=== Weekly charts ===
Chart (2008)	Peak position
Japanese Albums (Oricon)	1

=== Monthly charts ===
Chart (2008)	Peak position
Japanese Albums (Oricon)	1

=== Year-end charts ===
Chart (2008)	Position
Japanese Albums (Oricon)	13

== Sales and certifications ==
Region	Certification	Certified units/sales
Japan (RIAJ)	3× Platinum	750,000^{^}
^{^} Shipments figures based on certification alone.

== Singles ==
Date	Title	Peak position	Sales
March 14, 2007	"But/Aishō"	2	130,890
June 27, 2007	"Freaky"	1	200,322
September 19, 2007	"Ai no Uta"	2	134,831
November 14, 2007	"Last Angel"	3	91,620
January 23, 2008	"Anytime"	4	53,189
