= Fever Live in Hall II =

EP by Koda Kumi
- Released: July 2009 (JP); CD+DVD (RZCS-20866-B)
- Recorded: 2006–2009
- Genre: Japanese pop/R&B
- Label: Rhythm Zone
- Producer: SANKYO

Koda Kumi chronology
3 Splash (2009)	Fever Live in Hall II (2009)	Alive/Physical Thing (2009)

Fever Live in Hall II (stylized as KODA KUMI FEVER LIVE IN HALL II) is a special EP released by Japanese singer-songwriter Koda Kumi. The EP was released for promoting Kumi's second pachinko game, in which she collaborated with SANKYO for their games released throughout Japan. The EP was only released at promotional events for the game.

The extended play was released as a CD+DVD combo, with three previously released tracks on the CD, an alternate version of her music video "Lick me♥" and televised commercial for the pachinko game and its different levels. The CD contained the tracks "I'll be there" (2006), "anytime" (2007) and "Ai no Uta" (2007). The original version of "Lick me♥" was on her single 3 Splash, which was released the same month as the EP in July.

Two years prior, Kumi had released her debut pachinko game, Fever Live in Hall (stylized as FEVER LIVE IN HALL), which only carried a DVD. She would later release two more installments to the series: Love Romance (2012) and Fever: Legend Live (2014).

== Artwork direction ==
The creative direction of the EP's cover was done by Takashi Tadokoro of GRAVITAS Inc., while the photography was done by Kazuyoshi Shimomura of Tokyo AVGVST. Kazuyoshi is known for their works with Ayumi Hamasaki, whereas they did the photography for her compilation album A Complete ~All Singles~, and for taking the photographs for Kumi's style book KODA-SHIKI.

== Track listing ==
CD
No.	Title	Lyrics	Music	Arranger(s)	Length
1.	"I'll be there"	Koda Kumi	tasuku	Shintaro Hagiwara	4:12
2.	"anytime"	Koda Kumi	Hideya Nakazaki	Hideya Nakazaki	4:09
3.	"Ai no Uta"	Koda Kumi • Kosuke Morimoto	Kosuke Morimoto	Tomoji Sogawa	4:51

DVD
No.	Title	Length
1.	"Lick me♥ (Special Version)" (Music Video)
2.	"TVCM: Revival Edition, Shining Streets Edition, Colored Streets Edition" (復活編、輝く街編、彩る街編)
