= Fever Live in Hall =

EP by Koda Kumi
- Released: July 2007 (JP); DVD (OP0752A)
- Recorded: 2004–2007
- Genre: Japanese pop, R&B
- Label: Rhythm Zone
- Producer: SANKYO

Koda Kumi chronology
Freaky (2007)	Fever Live in Hall (2007)	Ai no Uta (2007)

Fever Live in Hall (known in Japan as CR Fever Koda Kumi (CRフィーバー倖田來未) with the image name "FEVER LIVE IN HALL") is a digital pachinko machine developed and released by SANKYO in 2007, with singer-songwriter Koda Kumi as the artist tie-in.

This was the first pachinko game with Koda Kumi and she would go on to collaborate for three more releases: Fever Live in Hall II (2009), Love Romance (2012) and Fever: Legend Live (2014).

== Information ==
Fever Live in Hall (stylized as FEVER LIVE IN HALL) is the debut pachinko game by Japanese singer-songwriter Koda Kumi. A limited extended play DVD was released during promotional events, where only a few copies were produced. Koda Kumi would later release Fever Live in Hall II (2009), Love Romance (2012) – neither of which were released publicly – and Fever: Legend Live (2014), which was later available to the public due to popularity.

The content of the DVD housed a general tutorial for game play and information about the pachinko machine and its differences compared to other pachinko games. It also featured possible videos players could access while playing, along with a digest video and the "Crystella" model utilized for the frame of the machines. The DVD was only available to those who purchased a set during the conventions, which were never made for a public release. The set not only included the instructional DVD, but also came with two champagne flutes with "KODA KUMI FEVER LIVE IN HALL" engraved on the glasses, a large promotional booklet carrying high quality promotional photos, a photograph-quality image of the main promotional image, and an instructional pamphlet about the game.

The DVD was the only one to not carry an alternate music video to a previously released song, whereas her future releases would carry either new renditions of past videos or new videos altogether.

== Gameplay information ==
While playing the music videos of "Wind," "Selfish" and "Cutie Honey," the music video for "you" intertwines, which was the original video chosen for the game. The movie for "Cutie Honey" has an animated cartoon of Honey appearing in the original music video in relation to the correct parts being played. While playing the jackpot in "Live Mode," the videos for "Butterfly," "Crazy 4 U," "Cutie Honey," "Ningyo-Hime," "Wind," "Selfish" and "you" plays. By selecting "jog selector" at the beginning of the jackpot, the number of songs selected can increase.

Probability of the jackpot changed depending on the jog selector. When the jackpot was obtained, from the beginning, players could listen to "Crazy 4 U," "Cutie Honey" or "Ningyo-Hime." A second consecutive win opened "Wind," a third opened "Butterfly" and a fourth opened "Selfish." On the sixth consecutive jackpot, "you" became available; however, it was only available with more than six consecutive jackpots of "15R" with only odd-numbers.

The music videos played according to the progression of each song. In "Live Mode," the songs would abruptly change depending on the player's winning probabilities.

== Promotional activities ==
Two of Koda Kumi's songs were used to assist in promoting the new game: "Cherry Girl" and "girls." Despite this, neither song appeared in the game.

During the campaign for the game, a group of 77 women known as the "Butterfly Girls" (バタフライガールズ) formed for the release events. On June 14, 2007, SANKYO held a presentation at the Grand Prince Hotel Takanawa in the special ward Shinagawa in Tokyo.

On June 20, 2007, Kumi herself held the event Premium Live in Hall at the Yokohama Arena in Yokohama. The live was later placed on the CD+2DVD editions of her studio album Kingdom. One month later on July 16, 2007, introductions of the game began in the Fukuoka Prefecture, which would span in halls nationwide.

== Promotional DVD track listing ==
DVD
No.	Title	Length
1.	"Opening" (オープニング)	2:11
2.	"Koda Kumi Fever Live in Hall" Promotional Expansion" (プロモーション展開)	2:10
3.	"Koda Kumi Fever Live in Hall" Digest" (ダイジェスト)	2:39
4.	"New Frame「Crystella」" (新枠「クリステラ」)	1:37
5.	"Action Preview" (予告アクション)	3:18
6.	"Action Reach" (リーチアクション)	4:26
7.	"More Actions" (その他アクション)	3:10
8.	"Vegas Vision" (ベガスビジョン)	0:44
Total length:		20:18
