= Fever: Legend Live =

EP by Koda Kumi
- Released: August 20, 2014 (JP)
- Recorded: 2014
- Genre: Japanese pop/R&B
- Length: 28:14
- Label: Rhythm Zone

Koda Kumi chronology
Hotel (2014)	Fever: Legend Live (2014)	Dance In The Rain (2014)

Fever: Legend Live (stylized as FEVER KODA KUMI LEGEND LIVE) is a special mini-album by Japanese artist Koda Kumi. The special album was released as a promotional campaign for SANKYO's pachinko game, Fever Legend (stylized as FEVER LEGEND), which is Koda Kumi's fourth installment; the priors were Fever Live in Hall (2007), Fever Live In Hall II (2009) and Love Romance (2012).

Initially, the special extended play album was only used and sold at promotional events for Fever Legend, and was limited to 400 copies. However, due to the high demand, the album was released on Amazon Japan for 7,600 yen. The album consisted of previously released songs and three new songs, all which were used for the pachinko game: "So Fever", "Never Give It Up" and "Kimi Omoi."

"Kimi Omoi" would later be placed as the b-side to Kumi's 2016 single Shhh! and on her 2017 studio album W Face ~inside~, while "So Fever" and "Never Give It Up" would be re-released as digital-only singles in 2023.

== Music videos ==
The EP contained three new music videos, which were released for the pachinko game.

"So Fever," (stylized as SO FEVER) is a sensual-themed music video, showing an erotic taboo-related get-together with both homosexual and heterosexual couples. Throughout the video, both men and women are seen in close proximity to both the opposite and same sex. Kumi is continually touched by other guests, while sporting a butterfly-theme, along with scenes in an erotic pool party late at night.

"Never Give It Up" (stylized as NEVER GIVE IT UP) carries a more comedic theme, with Kumi performing as a magician on a stage in front of a small crowd. Throughout the video, she is shown to perform the illusions incorrectly, accidentally hurting her assistant. The male assistant she hurts constantly tries to trade places with the female assistants, but they constantly refuse.

"Kimi Omoi" (君想い / Your Thoughts) is a soft and romantic video, portraying Kumi longing for a loved one. The imagery in the music video is very similar to that used in both singles Yume no Uta/futari de... and stay with me.

== Special promotional site ==
During the promotional activities of Fever: Legend Live, a special website was created to encourage people to play the new pachinko game, using Koda Kumi as the main focal point.

On the site, viewers could watch previews of the new music videos in video clips of the gameplay. They were also given a virtual tour of the promotional event, which included the outfits Kumi donned in the new music videos. The site also included the list of songs available on the new pachinko machines, including the live and music videos made available. Other features included mini games and reviews by various internet bloggers.

== Track listing ==
CD
No.	Title	Lyrics	Music	Length
1.	"So Fever"	Koda Kumi	NaNa★MUSiC • TRAK STA • EQ	3:24
2.	"Cutie Honey"	Claude Q	Takeo Watanabe • h-wonder	3:05
3.	"Butterfly"	Koda Kumi	Miki Watanabe	4:20
4.	"Kimi Omoi" (君想い / Your Thoughts)	Koda Kumi • Yoko Kuzuya	SAYALA • Mitsuki Shiokawa • Yoko Kuzuya	5:18
5.	"you"	Koda Kumi • Yoko Kuzuya	Yoko Kuzuya • Toru Watanabe	4:46
6.	"Koishikute" (恋しくて / Missing You)	Koda Kumi	M.I • Jam9 • Masaki Iehara	5:14
7.	"Never Give It Up"	Koda Kumi	Takashi Iioka	2:47
Total length:				28:14

DVD
No.	Title	Length
1.	"So Fever" (Music Video)	3:41
2.	"Never Give It Up" (Music Video)	3:03
3.	"Kimi Omoi" (Music Video)	5:26
Total length:		12:10
