= Koda Kumi Driving Hit's =

Remix album by Kumi Koda
- Released: March 25, 2009
- Recorded: 1999–2009
- Genre: House
- Label: Rhythm Zone

Kumi Koda chronology
Out Works & Collaboration Best (2009)	Koda Kumi Driving Hit's (2009)	UNIVERSE (2010)

Koda Kumi Driving Hit's (known in Japan as KODA KUMI DRIVING HIT'S) is the second remix album by Japanese pop star Koda Kumi - her first being Koda Kumi Remix Album (2006). It reached #6 on Oricon and remained on the charts for twenty-one weeks.

The album is remixed entirely by electronic duo House Nation. The album was released on the same day as Koda Kumi's fourth compilation album, Out Works & Collaboration Best.

The remix album is certified Gold for shipment of 100,000 copies.

== Track listing ==
1. "Lady Go!"
2. "Come Over" (Caramel Pod Club Mix)
3. "Koi no Tsubomi" (Shohei Matsumoto Remix)
4. "Crazy 4 U" (World Sketch Remix)
5. "real Emotion" (HOUSE NATION Sunset In Ibiza Remix)
6. "BUT" (MITOMI TOKOTO BIG ROOM REMIX)
7. "Get Up & Move!!" (Pink Chameleons Remix)
8. "Butterfly" (Prog5 Mirrorball Remix)
9. "Cutie Honey" (HOUSE NATION Sunset In Ibiza Remix)
10. "TABOO" (HOUSE NATION Sunset In Ibiza Remix)
11. "Run For Your Life" (Kaskade Remix)
12. "Sora" (Yukihiro Fukutomi Remix)
13. "anytime" (FreeTEMPO Remix)
14. "Ai no Uta" (The Standard Club PIANO DANCE Remix)
15. "COLOR OF SOUL" (DJ KANBE & Leisure Central Remix)
16. "Take Back" (Sunset In Ibiza Remix)
17. "Driving"

== Oricon Charts (Japan) ==
Release	Oricon Singles Chart	Peak position	First week sales (copies)	Sales total (copies)
March 25, 2009	Daily Chart	5		66,346
March 25, 2009	Weekly Chart	6	52,878	66,346
