= Fan Club Event 2008: Let's Party Vol. 1 =

Video by Koda Kumi
- Released: 25 February 2009
- Recorded: 2008
- Genre: Pop, R&B, J-pop, dance-pop
- Label: Rhythm Zone
- Producer: Koda Kumi

Koda Kumi chronology
Live Tour 2008: Kingdom (2008)	Fan Club Event 2008: Let's Party Vol. 1 (2009)	Live Tour 2009: Trick (2009)

Fan Club Event 2008: Let's Party Vol. 1 (stylized as FAN CLUB EVENT 2008「Let's Party Vol.1」) is the first Fan club Exclusive DVD from Japanese star Koda Kumi. It features a performance of eleven concerts held in seven different locations throughout Japan. The DVD was sold for a limited time.

The DVD contains a questionnaire for every area visited. Whichever ranked the highest was the performance Koochan gave in that area.

== Track listing ==
Official track list.

DVD
No.	Title	Length
1.	"Opening Video"
2.	"Koda Kumi Best Selection Countdown"
3.	"Kuu Mania No.1 Finals!! Quiz Koda Kumi"
4.	"Ask Kuu-chan! Question Corner"
5.	"Koda Kumi Announces Complete Results!!"
6.	"Yume no Uta"
7.	"Making Video"
