= Love Romance =

EP by Koda Kumi
- Released: March 2012 (JP)
- Recorded: 2008–2012
- Genre: Japanese pop/R&B
- Length: 16:00
- Label: Rhythm Zone

Koda Kumi chronology
Love Me Back (2011)	Love Romance (2012)	Go To The Top (2012)

Love Romance (stylized as Koda Kumi Love Romance Pachinko CR) is a special EP by Japanese artist Koda Kumi. The album was released as a promotional campaign for Sankyo's pachinko game, Love Romance, which is Koda Kumi's third installment (priors were Fever Live in Hall (2007) and Fever Live In Hall II (2009)). She would collaborate with SANKYO again for the 2014 released of Fever: Legend Live. Koda Kumi released a promo for its official release on available pachinko games throughout Japan.

The EP was only sold at promotional events. It only consisted of three previously released songs, but carried a new version for the music video of "Brave", which was originally on her Japonesque album.

== Music videos ==
For the DVD, an alternate version of "Brave" was utilized, which was only featured in the Pachinko game. The music video told the story of a mermaid, who fell in love with a human. Given a potion by a witch, she lives different lives with the man she fell in love with. The lives include an assassin who takes revenge on the ones who injured her lover, a genie who saves him from a possible execution and a fairy who meets him underneath the glow of moonlight.

During the gameplay, each song had differing videos:

- "Lady Go!" was an animated dance with an animated Koda Kumi and back-up dancers.
- "Butterfly" showed live footage of her during Dream Music Park concert.

== Track listing ==
CD
No.	Title	Lyrics	Music	Length
1.	"Moon Crying"	Koda Kumi	Miwa Furuse, h-wonder, Jun Abe	5:45
2.	"Lady Go!"	Claude Q	Kousuke Morimoto, Yusuke Tanaka	4:54
3.	"Suki de, Suki de, Suki de。"	Koda Kumi	Katsuhiko Sugiyama, Shinjiroh Inoue	4:58
Total length:				16:00

DVD
No.	Title	Length
1.	"Brave [Love Romance ver.]" (Music Video)	3:41
2.	"Love Romance搭載映像集" (Love Romance Automotive Footage)
