= Freaky (Koda Kumi song) =

Single by Koda Kumi

from the album Kingdom
- B-side: "Sora, Run for Your Life, Girls"
- Released: June 27, 2007
- Genre: J-pop
- Label: Rhythm Zone
- Songwriters: Tommy Henriksen, Koda Kumi

Koda Kumi singles chronology
"'But/Aishō'" (2007)	"Freaky" (2007)	"'Fever Live in Hall'" (2007)

Music video
- "Freaky" on YouTube

"Freaky" (stylized as FREAKY) is the 36th single by Japanese singer Koda Kumi, released on June 27, 2007. The single took the #1 spot on the Oricon charts, making it her fourth #1 single, and charted for fifteen weeks.

== Information ==
"Freaky" is Japanese R&B-turned-pop star Kumi Koda's thirty-sixth single under the Avex sub-label Rhythm Zone. It charted #1 on the Oricon Singles Charts, making it her fourth to do - the others being you, feel and Yume no Uta/futari de.... It remained on the charts for fifteen weeks with over 250,000 shipped. "Freaky," the title track, was certified platinum for downloads by RIAJ.

The single came in CD and CD+DVD, with limited editions for both. The limited editions contained a fold-out promotional poster. The CD+DVD version harbored instrumentals for the four tracks on the single, while the CD only carried remixes.

While the song contained four separate tracks, it was only listed as a double a-side, due to "Sora" and "girls" not having corresponding music videos and being listed as b-sides. On the corresponding album for the single, Kingdom; however, "Run For Your Life" was omitted from the CD portion.

Initially, "Run For Your Life" was not going to be on the single and, instead, would have been the song "anytime," which was released as a single seven months later. This is most apparent in the music video, whereas both "Run For Your Life" and "anytime" were filmed at the same location in California. A reason for the switch was never released, though fans speculated it was to give Kumi a ballad to be released during the winter months, whereas Ai no Uta was released in early Autumn.

== Promotions ==
"Freaky" was used as the song to advertise Honda's Honda ZEST SPORTS vehicle.

"Sora" (空 / Sky) was used as the television advertisement for Toshiba's mobile fanfun SoftBank 815T.

"Run For Your Life" was used to advertise makeup company KOSE's new Visee line.

"girls" was used as the theme song for Koda Kumi's new pachinko game SANKYO FEVER LIVE IN HALL.

== Packaging ==
Freaky was released in four editions, two regular editions and two first press editions:

- CD: contains eight musical tracks - four songs with instrumentals for each song.
- CD [First Press Edition]: contains eight musical tracks - four songs with remixes for each song.
- CD+DVD: contains eight musical tracks - four songs with instrumentals for each song - with two music videos and two making videos.
- CD+DVD [First Press Edition]: contains eight musical tracks - four songs with remixes for each song - with two music videos and two making videos.

First Press editions of both the CD and CD+DVD versions contained a foldout promotional poster.

== Track listing ==
(Source)

=== CD only ===
All lyrics are written by Koda Kumi.

CD: First press editions
No.	Title	Music	Arranger(s)	Length
1.	"Freaky"	Tommy Henriksen	Tommy Henriksen	3:18
2.	"Sora (空 / Sky)"	Jin Nakamura	Jin Nakamura	4:41
3.	"Run For Your Life"	Hiten Bharadia • Philippe-Marc Anquetil • Christopher Lee-Joe	Hiten Bharadia • Philippe-Marc Anquetil • Christopher Lee-Joe	3:11
4.	"girls"	Kosuke Morimoto	h-wonder	4:37
5.	"Freaky" (Surtek Collective's Action Remix featuring Peter Rap)	Surtek	Tommy Henriksen
6.	"Sora" (Yukihiro Fukutomi Remix)	Yukihiro Fukutomi	Jin Nakamura
7.	"Run For Your Life" (Kaskade Remix)	Kaskade
8.	"girls" (CUBISMO GRAPHICO Beach Girls MIX)	CUBISMO GRAPHICO	Hiten Bharadia • Philippe-Marc Anquetil • Christopher Lee-Joe

=== CD+DVD ===
CD: Normal edition
No.	Title	Lyrics	Music	Arranger(s)	Length
1.	"Freaky"	Koda Kumi	Tommy Henriksen	Tommy Henriksen
2.	"Sora"	Koda Kumi	Jin Nakamura	Jin Nakamura
3.	"Run For Your Life"	Koda Kumi	Hiten Bharadia • Philippe-Marc Anquetil • Christopher Lee-Joe	Hiten Bharadia • Philippe-Marc Anquetil • Christopher Lee-Joe
4.	"girls"	Koda Kumi	Kosuke Morimoto	h-wonder
5.	"Freaky" (Instrumental)		Tommy Henriksen	Tommy Henriksen
6.	"Sora" (Instrumental)		Jin Nakamura	Jin Nakamura
7.	"Run For Your Life" (Instrumental)		Hiten Bharadia • Philippe-Marc Anquetil • Christopher Lee-Joe	Hiten Bharadia • Philippe-Marc Anquetil • Christopher Lee-Joe
8.	"girls" (Instrumental)		Kosuke Morimoto	h-wonder

DVD
No.	Title	Length
1.	"Freaky" (Music Video)
2.	"Run For Your Life" (Music Video)
3.	"Freaky" (Making Video)
4.	"Run For Your Life" (Making Video)

== Charts ==
Oricon Sales Chart (Japan)

Release	Chart	Peak position	First week sales	Sales total	Chart run
June 27, 2007	Oricon Daily Charts	1			
June 27, 2007	Oricon Weekly Charts	1	108,349	200,322	15 weeks
June 27, 2007	Oricon Monthly Charts	1			
June 27, 2007	Oricon Yearly Charts	29			

== Alternate Versions ==
FREAKY

1. FREAKY: Found on the single (2007) and corresponding album Kingdom (2008)
2. FREAKY [Surtek Collective's Action Remix featuring Peter Rap]: Found on the CD only version of the single (2007)
3. FREAKY [Instrumental]: Found on the CD+DVD version of the single (2007)
4. FREAKY [Caramel Pod Remix]: Found on Koda Kumi Driving Hit's 3 (2011)
5. FREAKY [MATZ Remix]: Found on Koda Kumi Driving Hit's 8 (2018)

Sora

1. Sora: Found on the single (2007)
2. Sora [Yukihiro Fukutomi Remix]: Found on the CD only version of the single (2007) and Koda Kumi Driving Hit's (2009)
3. Sora [Instrumental]: Found on the CD+DVD version of the single (2007)

Run For Your Life

1. Run For Your Life: Found on the single (2007)
2. Run For Your Life [ Kaskade Remix]: Found on the CD only version of the single (2007) and Koda Kumi Driving Hit's (2009)
3. Run For Your Life [Instrumental]: Found on the CD+DVD version of the single (2007)

girls

1. girls: Found on the single (2007)
2. girls [CUBISMO GRAPHICO Beach Girls MIX]: Found on the CD only version of the single (2007)
3. girls [Instrumental]: Found on the CD+DVD version of the single (2007)
4. girls [TAKAROT "TOKYO FANTASTIC" Remix]: Found on Koda Kumi Driving Hit's 6 (2014)
