= Black Cherry (Koda Kumi album) =

Studio album by Koda Kumi
- Released: December 20, 2006
- Recorded: 2005–2006
- Genres: J-pop; R&B
- Label: Rhythm Zone
- Producer: Koda Kumi

Koda Kumi chronology
Best: Second Session (2006)	Black Cherry (2006)	Best: Bounce & Lovers (2007)

Singles from Black Cherry
- 1. "Koi no Tsubomi" Released: May 24, 2006; 2. "4 Hot Wave" Released: July 26, 2006; 3. "Yume no Uta/Futari de..." Released: October 18, 2006; 4. "Cherry Girl/Unmei" Released: December 6, 2006

Black Cherry is the fifth studio album by Japanese singer-songwriter Koda Kumi, released on December 20, 2006 by Rhythm Zone. It was her first original album since Secret (2005). It charted at No. 1 on Oricon, continuing the artist's streak and staying at No. 1 for one month. It remained on the charts for sixty weeks. It was released in CD, CD+DVD and CD+2DVD, with the latter being a limited edition that carried her movie debut Cherry Girl. The entire film's score was from the album.

== Background and release ==
Black Cherry is Koda Kumi's fifth studio album and eighth album overall. While it was only a year since her last studio album, Secret, two compilation albums and a remix album were released between Secret and Black Cherry: Best: First Things (2005), Best: Second Session (2006) and the limited digital album Koda Kumi Remix Album (2006). The album became her third consecutive album to chart at No. 1 on the Oricon Albums Charts, where it remained for one full month, charted for sixty-seven consecutive weeks.

It was released in CD, CD+DVD and a limited CD+2DVD. Each version contained different album artwork with Koda donning different classical outfits on each cover. First press editions of the album carried three bonus tracks: an English solo version of "Twinkle" (the original version was on the Amazing Nuts! soundtrack – Taiwanese singer Show Lo also carried an English version featuring Kumi on his album Speshow), the 2006 theme for the Crayon Shin-chan film "GO WAY!!", and two solo renditions of "Won't Be Long", which Kumi had originally collaborated for with Exile). The limited editions also contained an access code to Koda's playroom, a chance to win album goods and a bonus behind-the-scenes making of the music videos on the DVD.

The limited CD+2DVD editions held the short film Cherry Girl, which was Koda's debut acting role. The film was produced by the same team who created the drama Busu no Hitomi ni Koishiteru, which Koda Kumi had performed the theme "Koi no Tsubomi" (2006). The track "Milk Tea" was the first time Koda wrote and composed a song that was featured on an album. The album's introduction was later given a full version on her 2008 studio album, Kingdom.

== Packaging ==
Black Cherry was released in three editions, with each edition containing different cover art: CD, CD+DVD and a limited CD+2DVD edition. The standard editions all contained fifteen tracks on the CD portion, including the a-sides from her singles 4 Hot Wave and Cherry Girl/Unmei. Despite being a promotional track, the song "futari de..." from Yume no Uta/Futari de... failed to make it to the album, while "Yume no Uta" was placed as track No. 4. The DVD housed every music video released after her compilation album Best ~second session~ up until Black Cherry, sans "futari de...", which was omitted.

The second DVD, which was only available as a limited edition, housed the film Cherry Girl, which was Kumi's debut acting role. The film was heavily inspired by Charlie's Angels. Limited editions of all versions contained three bonus tracks on the CD: an English version of "Twinkle", the song "Go Way!!" (stylized as GO WAY!!) from the Crayon Shin-chan film, and an alternate version of "Won't Be Long". The limited DVD editions carried the making videos for all of the music videos, along with the music video for the English version of "Twinkle", which Kumi performed with Taiwanese singer SHOW.

== Endorsements ==
To help promote the album, several songs were utilized as promotional tracks. "Get Up & Move!!" was used for a Suzuki Chevrolet commercial. A music video to this song was later released on her third compilation album, Best ~Bounce & Lovers~. "Tsuki to Taiyou" was used to advertise the jewellery store GemCerey. While Koda was their spokesperson for a few years, she lost the position after her 2008 controversy. The song "Puppy" was used for KOSE's Rush Escalation under their Viseé line, while "Candle Light" was used to advertise Morinaga's Weider protein bar. "Go Way!!" was used as the ending theme song for the 2006 Crayon Shin-chan film.

== Music videos ==
Though new material was placed on the album, there was only one new music video: the English version of "Twinkle," which featured Taiwanese singer/actor Show Lo. The CD, however, carried Kumi's solo version of the song, also performed in English. The music video was originally on Show Lo's album Speshow, in which he featured Kumi (November 17, 2006). The Japanese version was released on the Amazing Nuts! album three weeks prior to Black Cherry on December 6, 2006. Two years later, Koda Kumi would release a solo version of the music video on her two DVD set for her Live Tour 2007 ~Black Cherry~ Special Final in Tokyo Dome.

The music video for "Koi no Tsubomi" was inspired by Koda's younger sister's, misono, video "Kojin Jugyō" (個人授業 / Private Lessons), which was also a different take on the classic fairy tale Cinderella. The videos' similarities start with both sisters having their own little fairy, who is able to transform their appearance. However, where "Kojin Jugyo" ends with the spell wearing off and returning misono to her original state, "Koi no Tsubomi" ends with the transformations staying and each girl affected to thank the fairy.

The music videos from 4 hot wave intertwined and were all placed on the album. "Juicy" was the first video in the story, showing Koda with her crew seducing a group of men in a bar, who have a treasure map. In the end of the video, the men realize the women stole the map. "With your smile" has Koda trying to outrun the men. The music video shows a race through the desert. "I'll be there" is the video showing where the map led. In the video, Koda is seen on a beach in Morocco, relaxing while enjoying the weather. The video ends with her finding the treasure. "Ningyo-hime" shows what the treasure led to. Its theme has Koda being controlled by a doctor, who is notorious for fusing parts of dolls together. While "ningyo hime" can translate to "mermaid princess," it can also translate to "doll princess," which is what the music video depicts.

"Yume no Uta" was a story of a woman, played by Koda, walking downtown to meet up with her lover. While walking, she thinks about their happy moments. When she sees her lover across the street, she runs towards him, but is hit by an oncoming vehicle. While her lover holds her, another woman, also played by Koda, sees the scene before walking off. The music video for "Cherry Girl" was composed of scenes from Koda's film of the same name, along with her singing while wearing her initial outfit worn in the film's opening scene. "Unmei" carried a theme of love, telling the story of two people separated by fate. "Twinkle" was an upbeat video with a green screen backdrop.

== Film ==
Cherry Girl is a Japanese action/drama film featuring Koda and actresses Megumi and Yuko Ito. The film was scored by Koda's album Black Cherry and the score was featured on the second DVD of the album.

== Track listing ==
Black Cherry – Standard edition
No.	Title	Lyrics	Music	arrangement	Length
1.	"Introduction"	Daisuke "D.I" Imai	Daisuke "D.I" Imai	Daisuke "D.I" Imai	1:24
2.	"Get Up & Move!!"	Daisuke "D.I" Imai	Daisuke "D.I" Imai • Ice Mike	Daisuke "D.I" Imai	3:22
3.	"Ningyo-Hime"	Koda Kumi	Miki Watanabe	Miki Watanabe	4:25
4.	"Yume no Uta"	Koda Kumi	Hiroo Yamaguchi	Tohru Watanabe	4:43
5.	"Tsuki to Taiyou (月と太陽/Moon and Sun)"	Koda Kumi • Yoko Kuzuya	Octopussy • Yoko Kuzuya	Octopussy	4:01
6.	"Puppy"	Koda Kumi	Miki Watanabe	Miki Watanabe	4:03
7.	"Koi no Tsubomi"	Koda Kumi	Yusuke Kato	Yusuke Kato	4:06
8.	"Won't Be Long" (Black Cherry Version)	Bro. Korn	Bro. Korn	h-wonder	4:29
9.	"Juicy"	Yo Taira	STY	STY	4:29
10.	"Candle Light"	Koda Kumi	Yoko Kuzuya	Tohru Watanabe	3:16
11.	"Cherry Girl"	Koda Kumi	Curtis A.Richardson • Charlene Gilliam • Andreao "Fanatic" Heard & Sherrod Barnes	Andreao "Fanatic" Heard • The Conglomerate	3:55
12.	"I'll Be There"	Koda Kumi	Shintaro Hagiwara	tasuku	4:15
13.	"Unmei"	Koda Kumi	Hirofumi Hibino	Masaki Iehara	4:21
14.	"With your smile"	Koda Kumi	Tohru Watanabe	Tohru Watanabe	4:15
15.	"Milk Tea (ミルクティー)"	Koda Kumi	Koda Kumi	h-wonder	2:35
16.	"Twinkle" (English Version)	Koda Kumi • Sachi Bennett	h-wonder	h-wonder	3:52
17.	"Go Way!!"	Koda Kumi	Hiroshi Komatsu	Hiroshi Komatsu	4:30
18.	"Won't Be Long" (Red Cherry Version)	Bro. Korn	Bro. Korn	h-wonder	5:11

Black Cherry – DVD 1
No.	Title	Length
1.	"Koi no Tsubomi" (Music Video)
2.	"Juicy" (Music Video)
3.	"With your smile" (Music Video)
4.	"I'll be there" (Music Video)
5.	"Ningyo-Hime" (Music Video)
6.	"Yume no Uta" (Music Video)
7.	"Cherry Girl" (Music Video)
8.	"Unmei" (Music Video)
9.	"Twinkle feat. SHOW" (English Version) (Music Video)
10.	"Premium Making Video"

Black Cherry – DVD 2
No.	Title	Length
1.	"Cherry Girl" (Movie)

== Charts ==
=== Weekly charts ===
Chart (2006)	Peak position
Japanese Albums (Oricon)	1

=== Monthly charts ===
Chart (2006)	Peak position
Japanese Albums (Oricon)	1

=== Year-end charts ===
Chart (2007)	Position
Japanese Albums (Oricon)	2

== Sales and certifications ==
Region	Certification	Certified units/sales
Japan (RIAJ)	Million	1,031,408

== Singles ==
Date	Title	Peak position	Weeks	Sales
May 24, 2005	"Koi no Tsubomi"	2	20 weeks	273,060
July 26, 2006	"4 Hot Wave"	2	16 weeks	390,685
October 18, 2006	"Yume no Uta/Futari de..."	1	16 weeks	301,169
December 6, 2006	"Cherry Girl/Unmei"	3	10 weeks	100,275
