= Last Angel =

2007 single by TVXQ and Koda Kumi

"LAST ANGEL feat. TVXQ"

Single by Koda Kumi featuring Tohoshinki

from the album Kingdom
- B-side: "Dear Family"
- Released: November 7, 2007 (Japan)
- Recorded: 2007
- Genre: J-pop; synthpop; Japanese hip hop
- Label: Rhythm Zone
- Songwriters: Koda Kumi, H.U.B, Djafari Negin, Ian-Paolo Lira • Hugo Lira • Thomas G:son

Koda Kumi singles chronology
| "Ai no Uta" (2007) | "LAST ANGEL feat. TVXQ" (2007) | "Anytime" (2008) |

Tohoshinki singles chronology
| "Shine/Ride On" (2007) | "Last Angel" (2007) | "Forever Love" (2007) |

Music video
- "Last Angel" on YouTube

"Last Angel feat. Tohoshinki" (stylized as LAST ANGEL feat. 東方神起) is the 38th single by Japanese singer Koda Kumi and is a collaboration with South Korean boy band TVXQ/Tohoshinki, released on November 7, 2007, in Japan. It charted at No. 3 on Oricon and stayed on the charts for twelve weeks. The single was released in CD and CD+DVD.

Limited editions of the single contained a postcard with Koda Kumi and Tohoshinki. The title song was also the first collaboration attempt of Tohoshinki as a group.

== Information ==
Last Angel feat. Tohoshinki is Japanese singer-songwriter Koda Kumi's thirty-eighth single and the first collaboration attempt of South Korean group Tohoshinki/TVXQ. It ranked No. 3 on the Oricon Weekly charts and remained on the charts for twelve weeks. Upon its release, the single sold 57,310 within the first week, and recent figures show the single having sold 97,620.

The single was released in both CD and CD+DVD editions, with limited editions containing a postcard of Kumi and TVXQ standing in front of the set for the music video.

The title track was used as the promotional song for the Japanese release of the Resident Evil: Extinction film. It was also used in a commercial for music.jp.

The rap in the song is performed by TVXQ members Yunho and Yoochun. The b-side, "Dear Family" was written by Kumi, while the a-side was written by Kumi and H.U.B.

At the time, TVXQ was not as well known throughout Japan and collaborated with Kumi to help gain notoriety in the country. The group learned Japanese prior to promoting in the country, whereas, at the time, South Korean groups had a difficult time becoming popular in Japan. It is speculated it is due to the collaboration why TVXQ's next single, Purple Line, was their first song to hit No. 1 on Oricon upon its release in January 2008.

Tohoshinki is known as "Dong Bang Shin Ki" (동방신기) in South Korea, "Tohoshinki" (東方神起) in Japan and "TVXQ" internationally. The logo TVXQ comes from the Chinese acronym of their name "Tong Vfang Xien Qi," which means "Rising Gods of the East."

TVXQ had their own version on their 2008 album T titled "Last Angel -Tohoshinki ver.-" (stylized as LAST ANGEL -TOHOSHINKI ver.-).

== Packaging ==
The single was released in two editions:

- CD: contains four musical tracks.
- CD+DVD: contains four musical track, a music video and making video.

Limited editions contained a postcard with Kumi and TVXQ and a foldout promotional poster. The Korean editions of the single carried a bonus booklet with the translation of the song. The CD+DVD Korean editions also had a translation of the interview in the making video.

== Promotional advertisements ==
Last Angel feat. Tohoshinki was used as the theme for the Japanese release of Resident Evil: Extinction. The film was better known as Biohazard III in Japan, whereas film, along with the other films in the series, is based on the survival horror video game series Resident Evil.

== Television performances ==
During the single's promotions, Kumi and Tohoshinki performed the song on several television stations to aid in the single's sales and notoriety. This included Music Fighter, Music Fair21, Music Japan, Music Station and Utaban.

- November 2, 2007: Ongaku Senshi Music Fighter
- November 3, 2007: Music Fair21
- November 9, 2007: Music Japan
- November 16, 2007: Music Station
- November 22, 2007: Utaban

Along with the televised performances, TVXQ performed the song with Kumi during her Live Tour 2007 ~Black Cherry~. Kumi would later perform the song with TVXQ during their 3rd Live Tour 2008 ~T~ concert.

== Music video ==
The music video for "Last Angel" was shot in Seoul, South Korea. The theme in the video carried an apocalyptic-theme, most notably due to the song being the theme for Japan's release of Resident Evil: Extinction. This is shown by the graying sky in the video's opening.

Both Kumi and the members of TVXQ wear outfits that are completely white. Kumi performs a dual role, also being shown in a large, open room, donning futuristic attire.

During the filming, TVXQ's lead vocalist, Jaejoong, donned his blonde hair, which he had been known to wear during his early years in the group.

== Track listing ==
(Source)

CD
| No. | Title | Lyrics | Music | Arranger(s) | Length |
|---|---|---|---|---|---|
| 1. | "LAST ANGEL feat. Tohoshinki" | Koda Kumi • H.U.B. | Negin • Ian-Paolo Lira • Hugo Lira • Thomas Gustafsson | Negin • Ian-Paolo Lira • Hugo Lira • Thomas Gustafsson |
| 2. | "Dear Family" | Koda Kumi | Tomokazu "T.O.M" Matsuzawa | Tomokazu "T.O.M" Matsuzawa |
| 3. | "LAST ANGEL feat. Tohoshinki" (Instrumental) | | Negin • Ian-Paolo Lira • Hugo Lira • Thomas Gustafsson | Negin • Ian-Paolo Lira • Hugo Lira • Thomas Gustafsson |
| 4. | "Dear Family" (Instrumental) | | Tomokazu "T.O.M" Matsukawa | Tomokazy "T.O.M" Matsukawa |
| Total length: | | | | | 17:32 |

DVD
| No. | Title | Length |
|---|---|---|
| 1. | "LAST ANGEL feat. Tohoshinki" (Music Video) |
| 2. | "LAST ANGEL feat. Tohoshinki" (Making Video) |

== Charts ==
| Release | Chart | Peak position | First week sales | Sales total |
|---|---|---|---|---|
| November 7, 2007 | Oricon Daily Charts | 2 | | |
| November 7, 2007 | Oricon Weekly Charts | 3 | 57,310 | 91,620 |
| November 7, 2007 | Oricon Monthly Charts | 9 | | |
| November 7, 2007 | Oricon Yearly Charts | 100 | | |

== Alternate versions ==
LAST ANGEL feat. Tohoshinki

1. LAST ANGEL feat. Tohoshinki: Found on the single (2007) and corresponding album Kingdom (2008)
2. LAST ANGEL feat. Tohoshinki [Instrumental]: Found on the single (2007)
3. LAST ANGEL -TOHOSHINKI ver.-: Found on TVXQ album T (2008)
4. LAST ANGEL feat. Tohoshinki [neroDoll remix]: Found on Koda Kumi Driving Hit's 2 (2010)
