= Won't Be Long =

2006 single by Exile & Koda Kumi

Single by Exile & Koda Kumi
- Released: November 21, 2006
- Genre: J-pop
- Length: 20:53
- Label: Rhythm Zone

Exile & Koda Kumi singles chronology
"Yes!" (2006)	"Won't Be Long" (2006)	"Everything" (2006)

Koda Kumi singles chronology
"Yume no Uta/Futari de..." (2006)	"Won't Be Long" (2006)	"Cherry Girl/Unmei" (2006)

Music video
- "Won't Be Long" on YouTube

"Won't Be Long" is a collaboration single by Japanese group Exile and singer-songwriter Koda Kumi. It debuted on No. 2 on Oricon and stayed there for the weekly ranking, bringing its monthly rank to No. 6.

== Information ==
Won't Be Long feat. Koda Kumi is Japanese band Exile's collaborative effort with Japanese R&B-turned-pop artist Kumi Koda. It charted No. 2 on Oricon and remained on the charts for over six months. Due to the high ranking and length on the charts, the single took No. 6 on the monthly charts.

Won't Be Long is a cover of the same song, originally released by Japanese band Da Bubble Gum Brothers on August 22, 1990.

Prior to the single's physical release, it reached one million downloads. Due to Koda Kumi being, at the time, Avex's most popular artist, the single charted higher than the original release.

Despite Takahiro joining Exile as a new vocalist around the time of the single's release, the song did not feature him and only featured Atsushi. The song was unveiled on December 30, 2006, during the 48th Japan Record Awards, but still omitted Takahiro.

The song was used in television commercials for dwango.jp, mu-mo and music.jp.

This song appeared on the Nintendo DS game version of Taiko no Tatsujin DS: Touch de Dokodon! (太鼓の達人DS: タッチでドコドン! / Master Taiko DS: Dokodon in Touch!) under its J-pop section.

== Other versions ==
In 1990s, Kwok Cheung Lee (李國祥) from Hong Kong covered this song with Cantonese and Mandarin-Chinese versions – "全為了你" (All for you) and "充滿光彩" (Fulfilled colors).

American vocal group Rockapella accompanied the Bubble Gum Bros. in a Christmas concert special in 1992. The song was also released on Rockapella‘s first studio album, To N.Y.

Koda Kumi also released two solo versions on her album Black Cherry (2006): Won't Be Long [Red Cherry Version] and Won't Be Long [Black Cherry Version]. Exile also had a different version on their album EXILE EVOLUTION (2007), this version featuring Japanese rapper NEVER LAND.

== Track listing ==
All tracks are written by Bro.Korn.

CD
No.	Title	Arranger(s)	Length
1.	"Won't Be Long"	h-wonder	5:14
2.	"Won't Be Long" (Karaoke)	h-wonder	5:13
3.	"Won't Be Long" (Karaoke for Guys)	h-wonder	5:13
4.	"Won't Be Long" (Karaoke for Ladies)	h-wonder	5:13
Total length:			20:53

DVD
No.	Title	Length
1.	"Won't Be Long" (Music video)
2.	"Won't Be Long" (Making Video)

== Charts ==
Oricon Sales Chart (Japan)

Release	Chart	Peak position	First week sales	Sales total
November 22, 2006	Oricon Daily Charts	2		
November 22, 2006	Oricon Weekly Charts	2	130,710	235,770
November 22, 2006	Oricon Monthly Charts	6		
November 22, 2006	Oricon Yearly Charts	56		

== Alternate versions ==
WON'T BE LONG

1. WON'T BE LONG feat. Koda Kumi: Found on the single (2006)
2. WON'T BE LONG [Karaoke for Guys]: Found on the single (2006)
3. WON'T BE LONG [Karaoke for Girls]: Found on the single (2006)
4. WON'T BE LONG [Instrumental]: Found on the single (2006)
5. WON'T BE LONG [Black Cherry Version]: Found on Koda Kumi album Black Cherry (2006)
6. WON'T BE LONG [Red Cherry Version]: Found on Koda Kumi album Black Cherry (2006)
7. WON'T BE LONG feat. NEVER LAND: Found on EXILE album EXILE EVOLUTION (2007)
8. WON'T BE LONG [United Colors Remix]: Found on Koda Kumi Driving Hit's 4 (2012)
9. WON'T BE LONG feat. VERBAL from m-flo & DOBERMAN INFINITY: Found on Exile Tribe album Exile Tribe Revolution (2014)
