= But/Aishō =

Single by Koda Kumi

from the album Kingdom
- Released: March 14, 2007
- Recorded: 2007
- Genre: J-pop, dance-pop, pop rock
- Label: Rhythm Zone

Koda Kumi singles chronology
"'Cherry Girl/Unmei'" (2006)	"But/Aishō" (2007)	"'Freaky'" (2007)

Music video
- "But" on YouTube "Aishou" on YouTube

BUT / Aishou (愛証 / Love Proof) is singer-songwriter Koda Kumi's 35th single and was released on March 14, 2007. It was her first single of 2007 and first to bring her new era, Kingdom. The single was a limited purchase, only being sold from March 2007 to May 2007. It charted No. 2 on Oricon and stayed on the charts for fourteen weeks. The single was released the same day as her third compilation album, Best ~Bounce & Lovers~, which was also of limited release.

== Information ==
BUT/Aishou is Kumi Koda's first single to bring in the era of Kingdom and charted No. 2 on Oricon. The single was of a limited release and was released the same day as her third compilation album, Best ~Bounce & Lovers~. One week later, an "analog version" was released, which contained the "Drum n' Bass" remix. This was the only edition to carry the remix.

Kumi described the song BUT as having the overall message of embracing who you are and not being afraid to show the world the real you. The music video had many homosexual overtones and, due to this, she became a gay rights activist among fans.

BUT was used as the theme song to the Japanese editions of the film Step Up. Aishou became the theme to the drama Ai no Rukeichi.

BUT is certified triple platinum as a ringtone and platinum as a digital download to cellphones by the RIAJ: 3× platinum for ringtone and platinum for cellphone. Aishou is certified platinum for downloads, and the single is certified gold for 100,000 copies shipped to stores.

== Music video ==
The music video for BUT consisted of Kumi being chained to the ceiling by a pulley. She attempted to break free of the chain and celebrates when she does. Once free, she becomes more provocative and descends in an elevator to a new room. Throughout the video, there are hints of homosexuality, including Kumi in close proximity to another woman. The overall theme was breaking from societal norms and being who you are.

The music video for Aishou was set in Feudal-era Japan within a shiro. The overall theme was of the passion she held with another person.

== Track listing ==
(Source)

=== CD version ===
All lyrics are written by Koda Kumi.

CD
No.	Title	Music	Arranger(s)	Length
1.	"BUT"	Tommy Henriksen	Tommy Henriksen	3:38
2.	"Aishou" (愛証 / Love Proof)	Yuuki Reika	Iehara Masaki	3:54
3.	"BUT" (The Ghettobots remix)	B-Money	Tommy Henrikson	3:51
4.	"BUT" (Instrumental)	Tommy Henriksen	Tommy Henriksen	3:36
5.	"Aishou" (Instrumental)	Yuuki Reika	Iehara Masaki	3:52

DVD
No.	Title	Director(s)	Length
1.	"BUT" (Music video)	Takashi Tadakoro
2.	"Aishou" (Music video)	Tomoo Noda
3.	"BUT" (Making Video)	Takashi Tadakoro
4.	"Aishou" (Making Video)	Tomoo Noda

12-inch Vinyl (Side A)
No.	Title	Music	Arranger(s)	Length
1.	"BUT"	Tommy Henriksen	Tommy Henriksen	3:38
2.	"BUT" (Drum n' Bass Remix)	DJ AKi (ES9 REMIX)	Tommy Henrikson

12-inch Vinyl (Side B)
No.	Title	Music	Arranger(s)	Length
1.	"BUT" (Ghettobots Remix)	B-Money	Tommy Henrikson	3:51
2.	"BUT" (Instrumental)	Tommy Henrikson	Tommy Henrikson	3:38

== Charts ==
Oricon Sales Chart (Japan)

Release	Chart	Peak position	First week sales	Sales total	Chart run
March 14, 2007	Oricon Daily Charts	1			
March 14, 2007	Oricon Weekly Charts	2	63,692	130,890	14 weeks
March 14, 2007	Oricon Monthly Charts	9			
March 14, 2007	Oricon Yearly Charts	59			

== Alternate Versions ==
BUT

1. BUT: Found on the single (2006) and corresponding album Kingdom (2007)
2. BUT [The Ghettobots remix]: Found on the single (2006)
3. BUT [Instrumental]: Found on the single (2006)
4. BUT [Drum n' Bass Remix]: Found on the "analog version" of the single (2006)
5. BUT [Mitomi Tokoto Big Room Remix]: Found on Koda Kumi Driving Hit's (2009)
6. BUT [KOZM Remix]: Found on Koda Kumi Driving Hit's 4 (2012)

Aishou

1. Aishou: Found on the single (2006) and corresponding album Kingdom (2007)
2. Aishou [Instrumental]: Found on the single (2006)
3. Aishou [Shohei Matsumoto & Junichi Matsuda Remix]: Found on Koda Kumi Driving Hit's 4 (2012)
