= Anytime (Koda Kumi song) =

Single by Kumi Koda

from the album Kingdom
- B-side: "Bounce"
- Released: January 23, 2008 (Japan)
- Genre: J-pop, R&B
- Label: Rhythm Zone (Japan)
- Songwriters: Hideya Nakazaki, Kumi Koda

Kumi Koda singles chronology
"'Last Angel feat. Tohoshinki'" (2007)	"Anytime" (2008)	"'Moon'" (2008)

Music video
- "Anytime" on YouTube

"Anytime" (stylized as anytime) is the 39th single released by Japanese artist Koda Kumi. It was released on January 23, 2008, a week prior to the release of her sixth studio album Kingdom. It charted at No. 4 on Oricon and stayed on the charts for five weeks. It was released in both CD and CD+DVD and was of a limited release.

== Information ==
anytime is Japanese singer-songwriter Kumi Koda's thirty-ninth single under the Avex sub-label Rhythm Zone. It reached No. 4 on the Oricon Singles Charts, making it her lowest since D.D.D. feat. Soulhead in 2005. However, despite being a limited release, remained on the charts for five weeks.

The single came in both CD and CD+DVD. The first press editions of both the CD and CD+DVD versions carried the remix for "anytime," with the CD+DVD versions carrying the "VJ KAITEKI Mix" for Kingdom.

Initially, "anytime" was set to be released on her 2007 summer single Freaky, but was omitted and replaced by the song "Run For Your Life." While fans speculated it was so Kumi could have another autumn/winter single, there was never an official reason given behind the switch. This is most apparent in the music video, whereas both "Run For Your Love" and "anytime" were filmed at the same location in California.

== Packaging ==
First press editions of anytime carried a bonus track on both the CD and DVD:

- CD: contained four musical tracks.
- CD [First Press Edition]: contained five musical tracks.
- CD+DVD: contained four musical tracks, along with a music video and making video.
- CD+DVD [First Press Edition]: contained five musical tracks, along with a music video, making video and "PV digest" of her upcoming album, Kingdom.

== Music video ==
"anytime" was shot in Los Angeles, California at the same location as "Run For Your Life." The music video on the single's CD+DVD differed than that placed on the corresponding album, Kingdom. Different scenes on the "album version" included extended scenes at the pool and Kumi in a bunny costume.

Limited editions of the CD+DVD also carried the "VJ KAITEKI Mix" of Kingdom, which was a digest preview video of the upcoming album. Several of the music videos that would be on the album were remixed to all flow together for the video.

== Track listing ==
All lyrics are written by Kumi Koda.

CD
No.	Title	Lyrics	Music	Arranger(s)	Length
1.	"anytime"	Kumi Koda	Hideya Nakazaki	Hideya Nakazaki	4:09
2.	"Bounce"	Kumi Koda	Anthony Anderson • Steve Smith • Chin Injetib		3:18
3.	"anytime" (FreeTEMPO Remix)	Kumi Koda	Hideya Nakazaki	Hideya Nakazaki	7:14
4.	"anytime" (Instrumental)	Kumi Koda	Hideya Nakazaki	Hideya Nakazaki	4:10
5.	"Bounce" (Instrumental)	Kumi Koda	Anthony Anderson • Steve Smith • Chin Injetib		3:19

DVD
No.	Title	Length
1.	"anytime [Single ver.]" (Music video)
2.	"anytime" (Making video)
3.	"Kingdom VJ KAITEKI Mix" (PV Digest)

== Charts ==
Oricon Sales Chart (Japan)

Release	Chart	Peak position	First week sales	Sales total	Chart run
January 23, 2008	Oricon Daily Charts	2			
January 23, 2008	Oricon Weekly Charts	4	43,051	53,189	3 weeks
January 23, 2008	Oricon Monthly Charts				
January 23, 2008	Oricon Yearly Charts				

== Alternate versions ==
anytime

1. anytime: Found on the single and corresponding album Kingdom (2008)
2. anytime [FreeTEMPO Remix]: Found on the single (2008) and Koda Kumi Driving Hit's (2009)
3. anytime [Instrumental]: Found on the single (2008)

Bounce

1. Bounce: Found on the single (2008)
2. Bounce [Instrumental]: Found on the single (2008)
3. Bounce [KOZM Remix]: Found on Koda Kumi Driving Hit's 3 (2011)
