= Ai no Uta (Koda Kumi song) =

- CD-only edition cover

Single by Koda Kumi

from the album Kingdom
- Language: Japanese
- B-side: "Come Over"
- Released: September 12, 2007
- Genre: J-pop
- Length: 4:51
- Label: Rhythm Zone
- Composer: Kosuke Morimoto
- Lyricists: Koda Kumi; Morimoto
- Producer: Tomoji Sogawa

Koda Kumi singles chronology
"Fever Live in Hall" (2007)	"Ai no Uta" (2007)	"Last Angel" (2007)

Music video
- "Ai no Uta" on YouTube

"Ai no Uta" (Japanese: 愛のうた; lit. 'Love Song') is the 37th single released by Japanese pop singer-songwriter Koda Kumi. The single was released in CD and CD+DVD, with limited editions carrying the "Urban Kiss Version" of Ai no Uta. The single was released on September 12, 2007, and followed the theme of Yume no Uta/Futari de... as an autumn/winter-time love ballad. It charted at No. 2 on Oricon and stayed on the charts for twenty-two weeks.

== Information ==
Ai no Uta is Japanese pop singer-songwriter Koda Kumi's thirty-seventh single released under the Avex sub-label Rhythm Zone. It charted at No. 2 on the Oricon Singles Charts and remained on the charts for twenty-two weeks. It was released in September 2007 and continued the theme of an autumn/winter-time love song, such as she did with Yume no Uta/Futari de... the year prior during her Black Cherry era.

The single was released in both CD and CD+DVD editions, with limited editions of each. Limited editions contained one bonus track: a remix of "Ai no Uta."

The title track has been described as a song about the sadness of fleeting love and how fragile and precious it is. The b-side, "Come Over," was the theme song used for the World Judo 2007 (世界柔道2007 / Sekai Judo 2007).

"Ai no Uta" was certified by the RIAJ as being downloaded as a ringtone more than one million times, and as a full-length download to cellphones more than 750,000 times.

== Music video ==
The music video of "Ai no Uta" carried a theme of a woman in love, but left broken hearted by her lover. A ring is used to symbolize the fragility of love, showing her saddened when he lover ignores her adoration of a ring in the window to a jewellery shop.

The video has been described as her "most stunning," with Kumi in a room surrounded by teardrop crystals.

An alternate version of the music video was placed on her corresponding album, Kingdom.

== Track listing ==
CD
No.	Title	Lyrics	Music	Arranger(s)	Length
1.	"Ai no Uta" (愛のうた / Song of Love)	Koda Kumi • Kosuke Morimoto	Kosuke Morimoto	Tomoji Sogawa	4:51
2.	"Come Over"	Koda Kumi	Miki Watanabe	Miki Watanabe	3:38
3.	"Ai no Uta" (URBAN KISS version) (bonus track)	Koda Kumi • Kosuke Morimoto	Kosuke Morimoto	Tomoji Sogawa
4.	"Ai no Uta" (Instrumental)		Kosuke Morimoto	Tomoji Sogawa	4:51
5.	"Come Over" (Instrumental)		Miki Watanabe	Miki Watanabe	3:38

DVD
No.	Title	Length
1.	"Ai no Uta" (Music video)
2.	"Ai no Uta" (Making video)

== Charts ==
=== Weekly charts ===
Weekly chart performance for "Ai no Uta"
Chart	Peak position
Japan (Oricon)	2

=== Monthly charts ===
Monthly chart performance for "Ai no Uta"
Chart	Peak position
Japan (Oricon)	9

=== Year-end charts ===
Year-end chart performance for "Ai no Uta"
Chart	Position
Japan (Oricon)	62

== Certifications ==
Certifications for "Ai no Uta"
Region	Certification	Certified units/sales
Japan (RIAJ)	Gold	100,000^{^}
Digital downloads
Japan (RIAJ)	Million	1,000,000^{*}
Streaming
Japan (RIAJ)	Platinum	100,000,000^{†}
^{*} Sales figures based on certification alone.^{^} Shipments figures based on certification alone.^{†} Streaming-only figures based on certification alone.

== Alternate versions ==
"Ai no Uta"

1. "Ai no Uta" (The Standard Club PIANO DANCE Remix): included on Koda Kumi Driving Hit's (2009)
2. "Ai no Uta" (JAXX DA FISHWORKS Remix): included on Koda Kumi Driving Hit's 7 (2017)

"Come Over"

1. "Come Over" (Caramel Pod Club Mix): included on Koda Kumi Driving Hit's (2009)
