= Yuko Ito =

Japanese actress

- Born: 18 April 1974 (age 52); Setagaya, Tokyo, Japan
- Occupations: Fashion model; actress; tarento
- Years active: 1995–present
- Children: 1
- Modeling information
- Height: 165 cm (5 ft 5 in)
- Hair color: Black
- Eye color: Brown
- Agency: Hori Agency (ja)

Yuko Ito (伊藤 裕子, Itō Yūko; born 18 April 1974) is a Japanese fashion model, actress, and tarento.

== Career ==
While attending university, Ito became an exclusive model for the fashion magazine JJ. In 1997, she made her acting debut in the Fuji TV television drama series Under the Same Roof 2.

== Personal life ==
Ito was born in Setagaya, Tokyo on 18 April 1974, the second of three daughters. She attended Seijo Gakuen Junior High School and High School and Seijo University, graduating with a Bachelor of Laws in 1997. Ito married a non-celebrity man in October 2011. Their first child was born in March 2012.

== Filmography ==
=== Film ===
Year	Title	Role	Notes	Ref.
1999	Goto Master Co., Ltd. Rookies	Chiharu Marunouchi		
1999	Messengers (ja)	Mamiko Maekawa		
2003	Night of the Shooting Star (ja)	DJ		
2005	Mahiru no Hana	Unknown		
2005	Fururi (ja)	Ryōko		
2006	Mirrorman Reflex (ja)	Asami		
2006	Maman	Unknown		
2006	Sea and Sunset and Her Tears Strawberry Fields (ja)	Ms. Kyōko		
2006	Dakara Watashi o Suwarasete	Unknown		
2006	Eko Eko Azarak R-page	Kozue		
2007	Bubble Fiction: Boom or Bust	Yūko Takahashi		
2009	Irezumi Seou Onna (ja)	Junko Yano		
2009	Together	Saki Miura		
2010	Sketches of Kaitan City	Chieko		
2012	Rinjō Gekijōban (ja)	Mariko Hayasaka		
2014	Kakute Megami wa Waraiki	Saki	Chapter 3: "Bad Girls"	
