= Koi no Tsubomi =

Single by Koda Kumi

from the album Black Cherry
- Released: May 24, 2006
- Recorded: 2006
- Genre: Pop; electropop; synthpop; bubblegum pop
- Length: 4:14
- Label: Rhythm Zone
- Lyricist: Koda Kumi
- Producer: Kato Yusuke

Koda Kumi singles chronology
| "'Get It On'" (2006) | "Koi no Tsubomi" (2006) | "'4 Hot Wave'" (2006) |

Music video
- "Koi no Tsubomi" on YouTube

"Koi no Tsubomi" (Japanese: 恋のつぼみ) is a song recorded by Japanese singer Koda Kumi, serving as her 31st solo under Rhythm Zone. It was the first single to bring in the new era after Best: Second Session. The single was released in CD and CD+DVD and charted at number two on Oricon, selling over 140,000 copies in its first week and staying on the charts for 21 weeks. It became the highest selling song debut for a female artist, until Ayumi Hamasaki surpassed it with her single "Blue Bird", which came out a month later on June 21.

== Background and release ==
"Koi no Tsubomi" is Japanese singer-songwriter Kumi Koda's thirtieth single under the Avex sub-label Rhythm Zone and first to kick off her Black Cherry era. The single charted No. 2 on the Oricon Weekly charts and remained on the charts for twenty-one weeks. The song managed to sell over one million copies in digital downloads, according to RIAJ.

"Koi no Tsubomi" became the highest selling song debut for a female artist, until Ayumi Hamasaki surpassed it with her single "Blue Bird". However, Kumi would later reclaim the spot with her release of her next single, 4 Hot Wave.

== Music video ==
The music video for "Koi no Tsubomi" was inspired by Koda Kumi's younger sister's, misono, video "Kojin Jugyō" (個人授業 / Private Lessons), which was also a new take on the classic fairy tale Cinderella. The videos' similarities start with both sisters having their own little fairy, who is able to transform their appearance. However, where "Kojin Jugyo" ends with the spell wearing off and returning misono to her original state, "Koi no Tsubomi" ends with the transformations staying and each girl affected to thank the fairy.

== Covers and usage in media ==
The song was used as the theme song to the Japanese drama Busu no Hitomi no Koishiteru (ブスの瞳に恋してる / In Love with the Eyes of an Ugly Girl), which starred SMAP's Goro Inagaki. The song was also used for the television commercial of the 2006 Pixar film Cars. On September 17, 2019, Dream Ami released a cover of "Koi no Tsubomi" as the theme song of FOD original serial drama Busu no Hitomi ni Koishiteru 2019.

== Alternate versions ==
Koi no Tsubomi

1. "Koi no Tsubomi": found on the single and corresponding album Black Cherry (2006)
2. "Koi no Tsubomi (A Cup of Milk Tea Bossa Nova Version)": found on the single (2006)
3. "Koi no Tsubomi (Instrumental)": found on the single (2006)
4. "Koi no Tsubomi (Shohei Matsumoto Remix)": found on Koda Kumi Driving Hit's (2009)
5. "Koi no Tsubomi (JAXX DA FISHWORKS Remix)": found on Koda Kumi Driving Hit's 7 (2017)
6. "Koi no Tsubomi (Adolfo De La Torre Casmartino Remix)": found on Koda Kumi Driving Hit's 9 -Special Edition- (2019)

== Track listing ==
CD single
| No. | Title | Lyrics | Music | Length |
|---|---|---|---|---|
| 1. | "Koi no Tsubomi" (恋のつぼみ) | Koda Kumi | Kato Yusuke | 4:14 |
| 2. | "Koi no Tsubomi" (A Cup of Milk Tea Bossa Nova Version) | Koda Kumi | Kato Yusuke | 4:13 |
| 3. | "Koi no Tsubomi" (Instrumental) | | Kato Yusuke | 4:12 |

DVD
| No. | Title | Length |
|---|---|---|
| 1. | "Koi no Tsubomi" (Music Video) |
| 2. | "Koi no Tsubomi" (Making Video) |

== Charts ==
=== Weekly charts ===
| Chart (2006) | Peak position |
|---|---|
| Japan Singles (Oricon) | 2 |

=== Year-end charts ===
| Chart (2006) | Position |
|---|---|
| Japan Singles (Oricon) | 28 |

== Certifications ==
| Region | Certification | Certified units/sales |
|---|---|---|
| Japan (RIAJ) Physical single | Platinum | 250,000^{^} |
| Japan (RIAJ) Chaku-uta | 2× Million | 2,000,000^{*} |
| Japan (RIAJ) Chaku-uta full | Platinum | 250,000^{*} |
^{*} Sales figures based on certification alone.^{^} Shipments figures based on certification alone.
