= Cherry Girl/Unmei =

"Cherry Girl / Unmei" Cherry Girl/運命"
- "Cherry Girl" CD-only cover

Single by Koda Kumi

from the album Black Cherry
- Released: December 6, 2006
- Recorded: 2006
- Genre: J-pop, P\pop
- Label: Rhythm Zone
- Songwriters: Kumi Koda, Curtis A. Richardson, Charlene Gilliam, Andreao "Fanatic" Heard", and Sherrod Barnes
- Producers: Andreao "Fanatic" Heard", Sherrod Barnes, The Conglomerate

Koda Kumi singles chronology
"'Won't Be Long'" (2006)	"Cherry Girl / Unmei"; Cherry Girl/運命" (2006)	"'But/Aishō'" (2007)

Alternative cover
- "Unmei" CD-only cover

Music video
- "Cherry Girl" on YouTube "Unmei" on YouTube

Cherry Girl / Unmei (運命 / Fate) is Koda Kumi's 34th single under the Rhythm Zone label. This was her last single released before the release of her 2006 album, Black Cherry. The single charted No. 2 on the Oricon charts.

The song "Cherry Girl" became the official theme song to her film debut Cherry Girl, which was released on the second DVD of her album Black Cherry. The music video for the song featured clips from the film, which harbored a Charlie's Angels theme.

== Information ==
Cherry Girl/Unmei is Japanese singer-songwriter Koda Kumi's thirty-fourth single and final single before the release of her studio album Black Cherry. It ranked No. 2 on the Oricon Singles Charts and remained on the charts for ten consecutive weeks. It was released in both CD and CD+DVD editions, with the limited editions carrying the Space Cowboy Remix of "Cherry Girl." The limited editions of the CD+DVD version carried a sticker of the single's cover, the remix of "Cherry Girl" and a trailer of her upcoming film Cherry Girl.

While "Cherry Girl" was an upbeat pop/rock mix, "Unmei" was a power ballad.

"Cherry Girl" became the theme song for Koda Kumi's debut drama Cherry Girl, which was later placed on the CD+2DVD version of her album Black Cherry. "Unmei" was used as the theme for the movie Oh! Oku. "Cherry Girl" was composed by Kumi along with Curtis A. Richardson, Charlene Gilliam, Andreao "Fanatic" Heard and Sherrod Barnes.

== Music video ==
"Cherry Girl" was composed of scenes from Kumi's film of the same name, along with her singing while wearing her initial outfit worn in the film's opening scene. Kumi had released a music video with a Charlie's Angels theme prior to this for her song "No Regret."

"Unmei" carried a theme of love, telling the story of two people separated by fate, hence the song's title (unmei means "fate" in Japanese). The imagery and feel of the music video would later be the inspiration for other famous artists, including American singer Kelly Clarkson's song "Already Gone."

== Track listing ==
(Source)

All lyrics are written by Kumi Koda.

CD
No.	Title	Music	Arranger(s)	Length
1.	"Cherry Girl"	Curtis A. Richardson • Charlene Gilliam • Andreao "Fanatic" Heard • Sherrod Barnes	Andreao "Fanatic" Heard • The Conglomerate
2.	"Unmei (運命 / Fate)"	Hirofumi Hibino	Masaki Iehara
3.	"Cherry Girl" (Space Cowboy Remix)	Space Cowboy
4.	"Cherry Girl" (Instrumental)	Curtis A. Richardson • Charlene Gilliam • Andreao "Fanatic" Heard • Sherrod Barnes	Andreao "Fanatic" Heard • The Conglomerate
5.	"Unmei" (Instrumental)	Hirofumi Hibino	Masaki Iehara

DVD
No.	Title	Length
1.	"Cherry Girl" (Music Video)
2.	"Unmei" (Music video)
3.	"DVD MOVIE「Cherry Girl」TRAILER"

== Charts ==
Oricon Sales Chart (Japan)

Release	Chart	Peak position	First week sales	Sales total
December 6, 2006	Oricon Daily Charts	2		
December 6, 2006	Oricon Weekly Charts	3	61,817	106,069
December 6, 2006	Oricon Monthly Charts	10		
December 6, 2006	2006 Oricon Yearly Charts	145		

== Alternate versions ==
Currently, there are four renditions of Cherry Girl and three for Unmei

Cherry Girl

1. Cherry Girl: Found on the single and corresponding album Black Cherry (2006)
2. Cherry Girl [Space Cowboy Remix]: Found on the single (2006)
3. Cherry Girl [Instrumental]: Found on the single (2006)
4. Cherry Girl [Sunset in Ibiza Remix]: Found on Beach Mix (2012)

Unmei

1. Unmei: Found on the single and corresponding album Black Cherry (2006)
2. Unmei [Instrumental]: Found on the single (2006)
3. Unmei [Shohei Matsumoto Remix]: Found on Koda Kumi Driving Hit's 3 (2011)
