= 4 Hot Wave =

Single by Koda Kumi

from the album Black Cherry
- Released: July 26, 2006
- Recorded: 2006
- Genre: J-pop; R&B; rock; house
- Length: 21:23
- Label: Rhythm Zone
- Lyricists: Koda Kumi; Taira Yo
- Producers: Miki Watanabe; Shintaro Hagiwara; STY; Toru Watanabe

Koda Kumi singles chronology
"'Koi no Tsubomi'" (2006)	"4 Hot Wave" (2006)	"'Yume no Uta/Futari de...'" (2006)

4 Hot Wave (stylized as 4 hot wave) is the 32nd single by Japanese singer Koda Kumi, released through Rhythm Zone on July 26, 2006. The singles contains the quadruple A-side tracks "Ningyo-Hime", "I'll Be There", "Juicy", and "With Your Smile". All four songs were included on Kumi's fifth studio album Black Cherry, released in December 2006.

A commercial success, 4 Hot Wave charted at number two on the Oricon Singles Chart and stayed on the charts for seventeen weeks. The sales for the single became Koda's highest selling single, even surpassing the total sales of "Real Emotion / 1000 no Kotoba" in less than three weeks. It became her highest debut single and reclaimed the title of highest debut sales female artists, previously held by Ayumi Hamasaki's "Blue Bird" (2006).

== Background ==
4 Hot Wave is singer-songwriter Koda Kumi's thirty-second single and is her first quadruple A-side, with each song containing a corresponding music video. Each song's music video tied together into one story. The single's artwork was shot in Morocco while Kumi was in the country shooting for her photo-book Maroc. The videos for "With Your Smile" and "I'll be there" were shot in Australia, with "I'll Be There" shot on Fraser Island. "Ningyo-hime" was certified gold for full-length cellphone downloads.

== Commercial performance ==
4 Hot Wave was commercially successful in Japan, it peaked number two on the Oricon Singles Charts and remained on the charts for seventeen consecutive weeks. The sales for 4 Hot Wave made it her highest selling single, even surpassing the total sales of "Real Emotion / 1000 no Kotoba" in less than three weeks. Within its first week, the single sold 207,484 copies, with 489,000 in total. Despite losing the number-one spot to KinKi Kids' "Natu Moyou", 4 Hot Wave outsold them by over 80,000 copies. At the end of the year, the single ranked number 2 on highest selling single female artist, losing out to Naoru Amane's "Taiyou no Uta", which was used in her film Midnight Sun.

Due to the single's success, it reclaimed the title of highest debut sales female artists, from Ayumi Hamasaki's "Blue Bird", which had originally taken the title from Koda Kumi's previous single, "Koi no Tsubomi".

== Television advertisements ==
Each song from the single was used for a promotional campaign during the single's release. "I'll Be There" was featured in a television advertisement for Sea Breeze, a sun-tan lotion company. "Juicy" was featured as a television advertisement for jewelry company GemCerey's Binary Face necklace, which was designed by Koda Kumi. "With Your Smile" was the image song for NTV's Pride & Spirit 2006 Nippon Professional Baseball and featured in a Dwango commercial. "Ningyo-hime" (人魚姫 / Mermaid Princess) was featured in a Vodafone 705T television advertisement.

== Music videos ==
The music videos tie-in together to show a story about rival treasure hunters attempting to gain a triad treasure. "Juicy" is the first video in the story, showing Kumi with her crew seducing a group of men in a bar, who have a treasure map. In the end of the video, the men realize the women stole the map. "With Your Smile" is the second video, in which Koda is shown trying to outrun the men. The music video shows a race through the desert. "I'll Be There" is the video showing where the map led. In the video, Kumi is seen on a beach in Morocco, relaxing while enjoying the weather. The video ends with her finding the treasure.

"Ningyo-hime" shows what the treasure led to. Its theme is of Koda being controlled by a doctor, who is notorious for fusing parts of dolls together. While "ningyo hime" can translate to "mermaid princess," it can also translate to "doll princess," which is what the music video depicts. While "Ningyo-hime" was shown to be a doll in the music video, she would perform it as a mermaid princess in her tour for the corresponding album, Black Cherry. This was most likely due to the term "ningyo hime" being able to be translated as either "doll princess" or "mermaid princess".

== Live performances ==
During the single's promotion, Koda Kumi performed the songs at several events, including:

- July 3, 2006 – Popjam DX – medley – "I'll Be There / Ningyo-hime~"
- July 21, 2006 – Music Station – "I'll Be There"
- July 22, 2006 – MelodiX! – "I'll Be There"
- July 28, 2006 – Music Station – "Ningyo-hime"
- July 29, 2006 – Music Fair 21 – "I'll Be There" feat. TRF, "Koi no Tsubomi" feat. TRF, "Joy" feat. TRF, "Ningyo-hime"
- July 29, 2006 – CDTV – "Ningyo-hime"
- July 30, 2006 – Cable Awards
- August 3, 2006 – Utaban – "I'll Be There"

== Track listing ==
CD single
No.	Title	Lyrics	Music	Arranger(s)	Length
1.	"Introduction – I'll Be There"				0:30
2.	"Ningyo-Hime" (人魚姫 / Mermaid Princess)	Koda Kumi	Miki Watanabe	Miki Watanabe	4:25
3.	"I'll Be There"	Koda Kumi	Shintaro Hagiwara	tasuku	4:12
4.	"Interlude – Juicy • Ningyo-hime"				0:43
5.	"Juicy"	Taira Yo	STY	STY	4:27
6.	"With Your Smile"	Koda Kumi	Toru Watanabe	H-Wonder	4:16
7.	"Outroduction – With Your Smile"				0:47

DVD
No.	Title	Director(s)	Length
1.	"Juicy" (Music Video)	Kubo Shigeaki	5:26
2.	"With Your Smile" (Music Video)	Kubo Shigeaki	4:22
3.	"I'll Be There" (Music Video)	Kubo Shigeaki	4:53
4.	"Ningyo-hime" (Music Video)	Tadakoro Takashi	4:40
5.	"making of "MAROC"" (found on limited editions)		2:05

== Charts ==
=== Weekly charts ===
Chart (2006)	Peak position
Japan Singles (Oricon)	2

=== Monthly charts ===
Chart (2006)	Peak position
Japan Singles (Oricon)	1

=== Year-end charts ===
Chart (2006)	Position
Japan Singles (Oricon)	14

== Sales and certifications ==
Region	Certification	Certified units/sales
Japan (RIAJ) Physical single	Platinum	489,000

== Alternate versions ==
Juicy

1. "Juicy": found on the single and corresponding album Black Cherry (2006)
2. "Juicy (Pink Chameleons remix)": found on Koda Kumi Driving Hit's 4 (2012)

Ningyo-Hime

1. "Ningyo-Hime": found on the single and corresponding album Black Cherry (2006)
2. "Ningyo-Hime (N15H vs. Heavens Wire D'n'B remix)": found on Koda Kumi Driving Hit's 5 (2013)

With Your Smile

1. "With Your Smile": found on the single and corresponding album Black Cherry (2006)
2. "With Your Smile (Groovehacker$ remix)": found on Koda Kumi Driving Hit's 3 (2011)

I'll Be There

1. "I'll Be There": found on the single and corresponding album Black Cherry (2006)
2. "I'll Be There (JOE IRON Remix)": Found on Koda Kumi Driving Hit's 9 -Special Edition- (2019)
