= Yume no Uta/Futari de... =

"Yume no Uta/Futari de..." "夢のうた/ふたりで…"

Single by Koda Kumi

from the album Black Cherry
- Released: October 18, 2006
- Recorded: 2006
- Genre: Pop, ballad
- Label: Rhythm Zone; CD (RZCD-45469); CD+DVD RZCD-45468)

Koda Kumi singles chronology
"'4 Hot Wave'" (2006)	"Yume no Uta/Futari de..." "夢のうた/ふたりで…" (2006)	"'Won't Be Long'" (2006)

Alternate version
- Yume no Uta / futari de... (back cover)

Music video
- "Yume no Uta" on YouTube "futari de..." on YouTube

Yume no Uta/futari de... (夢のうた/ふたりで... / Dream Song/us two...) is singer-songwriter Koda Kumi's 33rd single under the Rhythm Zone label, and is her second attempt at a double a-side. The single charted at No. 1 on Oricon and stayed on the charts for sixteen weeks, out-selling her previous single, 4 Hot Wave. This made her first No. 1 single since feel. The single came in CD and CD+DVD and both a-sides have their unique cover art.

== Information ==
Yume no Uta/futari de... is Japanese singer-songwriter Koda Kumi's thirty-third single and third to chart at No. 1 on the Oricon Singles Charts – the previous singles being you and feel. It was her second attempt at a double a-side, her first being Promise/Star, which had been released over a year ago on her Best ~first things~ album.

The single was released as both a standard CD and a CD+DVD edition, each harboring a limited edition, which carried remixes for both tracks on the CD portion. The CD version carried both tracks with the corresponding instrumentals, while the DVD harbored music videos for both title tracks.

The original song was composed by Hirō Yamaguchi. Toru Watanabe performed the instrumental for "Yume no Uta", while famed composer h-wonder performed "futari de...".

While "Yume no Uta" was placed on the corresponding album Black Cherry, "futari de..." was omitted. "Yume no Uta" was used as theme to the manga-turned-drama Damens Walker.

== Background and composition ==
Upon hearing the composition for the song by Hirō Yamaguchi, Koda Kumi mentioned how it had both happy and sad elements. She took the reins and had the song split in two, making "Yume no Uta" to encompass the sadness experienced after a break-up, and "futari de..." to encompass the happiness of growing with someone. Toru Watanabe performed the instrumentals for "Yume no Uta", while h-wonder performed "futari de...".

Toru Watanabe had previous worked with Kumi for her 2005 album secret, along with working with Kumi's younger sister misono. She has also worked with the likes of TRF and Ami Suzuki. h-wonder had worked with Kumi previously for her studio albums affection (2002) and Grow into One. They have also worked with the likes of Yoko Kanno, BoA and MAX, and South Korean groups TVXQ and After School.

The single also made a milestone in her career, where it became the first time she took complete control. Along with the musical direction, she also wrote the lyrics for both tracks and assisted in the direction for the music video, including choosing the clothing for her alternate characters.

== Packaging ==
Yume no Uta/futari de... was released in four formats, with limited editions having differing cover art:

- CD: contains four musical tracks.
- CD [Limited Edition]: contains eight musical tracks.
- CD+DVD: contains four musical track and two music videos.
- CD+DVD [Limited Edition]: contains eight musical tracks and two music videos.

Each edition had its own cover art and the limited editions contained remixes for both Yume no Uta and futari de....

== Music videos ==
For the music videos, Kumi took over the direction and costume designing, making it her first to have complete control over. With having the two songs with a similar melody, the videos themselves had intertwined story-lines.

"Yume no Uta" is a story of a woman, played by Kumi, walking downtown to meet up with her lover. While walking, she reminisces about their happy moments. When she sees her lover across the street, she runs towards him, but is hit by an oncoming vehicle. While her lover holds her, another woman, also played by Kumi, sees the scene before walking off.

On the contrast, "futari de..." is a story of a woman walking downtown, upset after having an argument with her lover. It shows several of their moments, some happy and others arguing. After an argument, she runs into oncoming traffic and is nearly hit by a vehicle. Her lover, however, turns his back and she runs off. While sitting on the curb, with the spirit of the other woman by her, her phone rings and her lover reaches down and presses the "answer" button. The two reconcile and the spirit smiles.

== Track listing ==
(Source)

CD
No.	Title	Lyrics	Music	Arranger(s)	Length
1.	"Yume no Uta"	Koda Kumi	Toru Watanabe	Hiroo Yamaguchi	4:47
2.	"futari de..."	Koda Kumi	h-wonder	Hiroo Yamaguchi	4:43
3.	"Yume no Uta" (Quartet Version)	Koda Kumi	Udai Shika	Hiroo Yamaguchi	4:31
4.	"futari de..." (WHOOSH MIX)	Koda Kumi	Cube Juice	Hiroo Yamaguchi	4:40
5.	"Yume no Uta" (Instrumental)		Toru Watanabe	Hiroo Yamaguchi	4:47
6.	"futari de..." (Instrumental)		h-wonder	Hiroo Yamaguchi	4:33

DVD
No.	Title	Director(s)	Length
1.	"Yume no Uta" (Music Video)	Koda Kumi	4:47
2.	"futari de..." (Music Video)	Koda Kumi	4:43
3.	"Yume no Uta/futari de..." (Making Video)	Koda Kumi

== Charts (Japan) ==
Oricon sales chart

Release	Chart	Peak position	First week sales	Sales total
October 18, 2006	Oricon Daily Chart	1		
October 18, 2006	Oricon Weekly Chart	1	175,643	301,169
October 18, 2006	Oricon Monthly Chart	2		
October 18, 2006	Oricon Yearly Chart	26		

== Alternate versions ==
Yume no Uta

1. "Yume no Uta": found on the single and corresponding album Black Cherry (2006)
2. "Yume no Uta" [Quartet Version]: found on the single (2006)
3. "Yume no Uta" [Instrumental]: found on the single (2006)
4. "Yume no Uta" [Sunset in Ibiza Remix]: found on Koda Kumi Driving Hit's 2 (2010)

futari de...

1. "futari de...": found on the single (2006)
2. "futari de..." [WHOOSH MIX]: found on the single (2006)
3. "futari de..." [Instrumental]: found on the single (2006)
