= Misono discography =

misono discography
- Studio albums: 4
- Extended plays: 2
- Compilation albums: 2
- Singles: 19
- Music videos: 41

The discography of Japanese singer-songwriter Koda Misono (best known by her stage name "misono") includes 4 studio albums, 2 compilation albums, 2 cover albums and 19 singles. Her releases have been under the record label Avex Trax, which is the first label under the Avex Group.

Although having debuted as the lead vocalist for the band day after tomorrow in 2002, misono debuted as a solo artist on March 29, 2006, with her single VS. The single debuted in the top five of the Oricon charts, but would become her only solo single to break the top five.

Despite releasing multiple singles annually, along with annual albums, misono's releases would fail to chart well. Her debut album Never+Land (2007) charted at No. 20, Sei -say- (2008) at No. 20, Me (2010) at No. 35 and Uchi (2014) at No. 49. Due to her decreasing sales, her final album, Uchi, had the message, "If we do not sell 10,000 albums, misono can't release another CD," as a subtitle to the album.

As of October 13, 2014, misono has not released another single or album.

== Albums ==
=== Studio albums ===
| Year | Album Information | Oricon Albums Charts | Reported sales |
|---|---|---|---|
| 2007 | Never+Land: Released: February 28, 2007; Label: Avex Trax (AVCD-23204); Formats: CD, digital download | 20 | 13,000 |
| 2008 | Sei -say-: Released: July 16, 2008; Label: Avex Trax (AVCD-23624); Formats: CD, digital download | 20 | 13,000 |
| 2010 | Me: Released: June 30, 2010; Label: Avex Trax (AVCD-38110); Formats: CD, digital download | 20 | 7,000 |
| 2014 | Uchi※There won't be any New CD from misono if this Album can't sell over Ten Thousand: Released: October 13, 2014; Label: Avex Trax (AVCD-93026); Formats: CD | 49 | 5,307 |

=== Cover albums ===
| Year | Album Information | Oricon Albums Charts | Reported sales |
|---|---|---|---|
| 2009 | Cover Album: Released: September 23, 2009; Label: Avex Trax (AVCD-23889); Formats: CD, digital download | 28 | 7,000 |
| 2010 | Cover Album 2: Released: January 27, 2010; Label: Avex Trax (AVCD-23962); Formats: CD, digital download | 44 | 5,000 |

=== Extended plays ===
| Year | Album Information | Oricon Albums Charts | Reported sales |
|---|---|---|---|
| 2009 | Tales with misono-Best-: Compilation EP featuring misono's Tales-related songs.; Released: June 10, 2009; Label: Avex Trax (AVCD-23879); Formats: CD, digital download | 21 | 13,000 |
| 2013 | Symphony with Misono Best: Compilation EP featuring misono's Tales-related song.; Released: October 9, 2013; Label: Avex Trax (AVCD-38784); Formats: CD, digital download | 18 | 3,407 |

== Singles ==
| Release | Title | Notes | Chart positions | | | Oricon sales | Album |
| Release | Title | Notes | Oricon Singles Charts | Billboard Japan Hot 100† | RIAJ digital tracks† | Oricon sales | Album |
|---|---|---|---|---|---|---|---|
| 2006 | "VS" | | 4 | — | — | 40,000 | Never+Land |
| 2006 | "Kojin Jugyō" | Finger 5 cover. | 15 | — | — | 16,000 | Never+Land |
| 2006 | "Speedrive" | | 21 | — | — | 16,000 | Never+Land |
| 2006 | "Lovely♡Cat's Eye" | | 14 | — | — | 17,000 | Never+Land |
| 2007 | "Hot Time/A.__~answer~" | | 22 | — | — | 8,400 | Never+Land/Sei -say- |
| 2007 | "Pochi" | | 36 | — | — | 4,100 | Sei -say- |
| 2007 | "Zasetsu Chiten" | Produced by Hidekazu Hinata (Straightener). | 39 | — | — | 3,700 | Sei -say- |
| 2008 | "Juunin Toiro" | Produced by GO!GO!7188 | 47 | — | — | 3,200 | Sei -say- |
| 2008 | "Mugen Kigen" | Produced by Onsoku Line. | 32 | — | — | 3,000 | Sei -say- |
| 2008 | "Ninin Sankyaku" | | 10 | 71 | 93* | 28,000 | Sei -say- |
| 2008 | "Kazoku no Hi/Aburazemi♀" | | 23 | 52 | 60*; 95* | 5,600 | Me |
| 2009 | "Kyuukon ~Yaruki•Genki•Sono Ki no Nekko~ / ?cm" | | 40 | 46 | — | 3,800 | Me |
| 2009 | "end=Start/Suuten ~Kimi no Ude no Naka~" | | 19 | 82 | 76 | 6,700 | Me |
| 2009 | "Urusei Yatsura no Theme ~Lum no Love Song／「Mii」" | Yuko Matsutani cover. | 18 | 45 | 64 | 4,800 | Cover Album |
| 2009 | "Watashi Iro/Bokura Style" | Written by Kohmi Hirose. | 34 | 79 | — | 3,800 | Me |
| 2010 | "...Suki xxx/0-ji Mae no Tsunderella" | | 15 | 35 | — | 3,000 | Me |
| 2011 | "Hontouso/Sukirai" | | 26 | — | — | — | Uchi |
| 2012 | "Maialino!" | | 61 | — | — | — | Uchi |
| 2012 | "Itsumademo... Teddy Bear" | | 77 | — | — | — | Uchi |

== Collaborations ==
| Release | Artist | Title | Chart positions | | | Oricon sales | Album |
| Release | Artist | Title | Oricon Singles Charts | Billboard Japan Hot 100† | RIAJ digital tracks† | Oricon sales | Album |
|---|---|---|---|---|---|---|---|
| 2003 | Cyber X feat. misono | "11 eleven" | 18 | — | — | 20,000 | Cyber X #01 |
| 2009 | Koda Kumi x misono | "It's All Love!" | 1 | 1 | 1 | 99,000 | Universe |
| 2009 | Friends & Hexagon All Stars | "Naite mo Ii Desu ka" | 2 | 4 | 59 | 115,000 | We Love Hexagon 2009 |
| 2010 | Hexagon All Stars & Tsubasa | "Bokura niwa Tubasa ga Aru (Oozora e)" | — | — | — | — | |

== Promotional videos ==
=== Never+Land ===
- VS
- Kojin Jugyō
- Speedrive
- Lovely♡Cat's Eye
- A.__~answer~
- Hot Time -Mud 1 Take ver.-
- A.__~answer~ -Album ver.-
- Suna no Shiro no Mermaid ~Riku to Umi no Sekai~

=== Sei -say- ===
- Hot Time
- Pochi
- Zasetsu Chiten
- Juunin Toiro
- Mugen Kigen
- Ninin Sankyaku
- Zasetsu Chiten -BOX ver.-
- Juunin Toiro −10 misono's ver.-
- Mugen Kigen -Painting ver.-
- Ninin Sankyaku -say ver.-

=== Me ===
- Kazoku no Hi
- Kyuukon ~Yaruki・Genki・Sono Ki no Nekko~
- Tenbin ~Tsuyogari na Watashi×Yowagari na Kimi~
- end=Start
- Bokura Style
- 「...Suki×××」
- 0-ji Mae no Tsunderella
- Watashi Iro
- end=Start −4 misono's ver.-

=== Uchi ===
- Ho・n・to・u・so
- Maialino!
- Koitsuri Girl Ai Girl ~Fishing Boy~
- NO you! NO life! NO...××? feat. ME -ME direction ver.-
- Uchi! Uchi! ROCK ~Toriatsukai Setsumeisho~

=== Tales with misono-Best- ===
- Tales with misono−Best− Video Medley

=== symphony with misono Best ===
- Starry Heavens (ver.2013)
- Junction Punctuation Mark
- 61-byoume no... Fura Letter Saigo no Hatsukoi ~Copernicus Tekitenkai~

=== Cover album ===
- misono to Utaou! Animedley I
- Urusei Yatsura no Theme ~Lum no Love Song~

=== Universe ===
- It's All Love! (Koda Kumi x misono)

=== Hello World ===
- with you feat. Me (Back-On x misono)

=== Premium Cocoa ===
- NO you! NO life! NO...××? feat. Me (Cocoa Otoko x misono)
