= Symphony with Misono Best =

symphony with misono Best

EP by misono
- Released: 9 October 2013 (JP); CD (AVCD-38784); CD+DVD (AVCD-38783/B)
- Recorded: 2013
- Genre: Japanese pop, pop/rock
- Label: Avex Trax

Misono chronology
Me (2010)	symphony with misono Best (2013)	Ie -Uchi- (2014)

Alternative cover
- CD+DVD

Symphony with misono Best (stylized as symphony with misono BEST) is the second EP by Japanese artist misono. The EP contained three rearranged tracks, which misono performed for the video game Tales of Symphonia Chronicles for the PlayStation 3, and two new tracks.

The EP did not chart as well as her previous EP, Tales with misono-Best-, barely breaking the top 30 at No. 29. It remained on the charts for two weeks.

== Information ==
Symphony with misono Best is the second extended play by Japanese singer-songwriter misono, her first being Tales with misono-Best- in 2009. While the EP peaked at No. 18 on the charts, it failed to be as successful as its predecessor, dropping in rank and coming in at No. 29 on the Oricon Albums Charts for the weekly ranking. It remained on the charts for only two straight weeks.

Symphony with misono Best was released as both a standalone CD and a CD+DVD combo. For the cover of the album, misono donned the three outfits she would wear in the three new music videos on the DVD. Of the videos, a new version of "Starry Heavens" was created, which misono had performed while she was the lead vocalist of the band day after tomorrow.

The EP followed the release of the role-playing video game Tales of Symphonia Chronicles for the PlayStation 3. The video game is a remaster of Tales of Symphonia and Tales of Symphonia: Dawn of the New World. Following the games, the songs "Starry Heavens," "Soshite Boku ni Dekiru Koto" and "Ninin Sankyaku" were remastered for the 2013 release. Along with the remastering of previous songs, the EP contained two new tracks: "Junction Punctuation Mark" and "61 Byoume no... Fura Letter Saigo no Hatsukoi ~Copernicus Tekitenkai~" (61秒目の...フラLetter最後の初恋〜コペルニクス的転回〜 / 61st second... fluttering Letter the last first love ~Copernicus Turning~). Both tracks received music videos on the accompanying DVD.

For the remasters of "Starry Heavens" and "Soshite Boku ni Dekiru Koto," Mitsuru Igarashi from the group Every Little Thing performed the instrumentals. This is unlike the original versions, which utilized both Mitsuru and the members of the band day after tomorrow. As for the new version of "Ninin Sankyaku," Atsushi Sato, best known by his stage name "ats-", from the band HΛL performed the music. The original piece was performed by the indie rock band PLECTRUM. The two new tracks on the EP, "Junction Punctuation Mark" and "61 Byoume no... Fura Letter Saigo no Hatsukoi ~Copernicus Tekitenkai~," were written by misono herself, both musically and lyrically. Japanese musical composer and lyricist ZENTA (土橋善太 / Tsuchihashi Zenta) performed the instrumentals for the songs, however.

Both "Junction Punctuation Mark" and "61 Byoume no... Fura Letter Saigo no Hatsukoi ~Copernicus Tekitenkai~", along with their corresponding music videos, would later be included on misono's fourth and final studio album Uchi.

== Track listing ==
CD
No.	Title	Lyrics	Music	Arranger(s)	Length
1.	"Starry Heavens" (ver.2013)	misono	Mitsuru Igarashi	Daisuke Suzuki	4:46
2.	"Soshite Boku ni Dekiru Koto" (ver.2013)	Mitsuru Igarashi	Mitsuru Igarashi	Daisuke Suzuki	4:36
3.	"Ninin Sankyaku" (ver.2013)	misono	ats-	Akio Shimizu	4:33
4.	"Junction Punctuation Mark"	misono	ZENTA	misono	4:01
5.	"61 Byoume no... Fura Letter Saigo no Hatsukoi ~Copernicus Tekitenkai~" (61秒目の…フラLetter 最後の初恋〜コペルニクス的転回〜)	misono	ZENTA	misono	4:54

DVD
No.	Title	Length
1.	"61 Byoume no... Fura Letter Saigo no Hatsukoi ~Copernicus Tekitenkai~" (Music Video)	4:49
2.	"Starry Heavens (ver.2013)" (Music Video)	4:42
3.	"Junction Punctuation Mark" (Music Video)	4:02
4.	"Ninin Sankyaku" (Tales of Festival 2013)
5.	"Ho・n・to・u・so" (Tales of Festival 2013)
6.	"Tales..." (Tales of Festival 2013)

== Charts ==
=== Oricon sales chart ===
Release	Chart	Peak position	Sales total
9 October 2013	Oricon Daily Albums Chart	18	2,684
9 October 2013	Oricon Weekly Albums Chart	29	3,407
