= Tales with Misono: Best =

Tales with misono-Best-

EP by misono
- Released: June 10, 2009 (JP)
- Recorded: 2004–2009
- Genre: Japanese pop, pop/rock
- Label: Avex Trax

Misono chronology
Sei -say- (2008)	Tales with misono-Best- (2009)	Cover Album (2009)

Tales with misono -Best- (stylized as Tales with misono-BEST-) is Japanese artist misono's first greatest hits EP. The EP was a collection of the songs she performed for the Tales of... series both as a soloist and while she was the lead vocalist in the group day after tomorrow, which disbanded in mid-2005 following the release of a compilation album.

The EP charted well on Oricon, coming in at No. 21 and remaining on the charts for five weeks.

== Information ==
Tales with misono -Best- is the first greatest hits EP by Japanese singer-songwriter misono. The EP charted well on the Oricon Albums Charts, taking No. 21 for the weekly ranking and remaining on the charts for five consecutive weeks.

The EP was released in two formats: a standard CD and a CD+DVD format. The CD portion contained all of the songs misono had performed for the Tales of series of role-playing video games, both as a soloist and as the lead vocalist during her time in the band day after tomorrow. The DVD, however, did not carry the music videos for any of the songs. Instead, the openings for each respective game were used in lieu of the promotional music videos.

Though the CD was made up primarily of previously released tracks, it did carry one new song written solely for the EP: "Tales...". Musically, the song was very reminiscent of the song "Starry Heavens," which misono performed with her band day after tomorrow for the opening video to the video game Tales of Symphonia. misono wrote the music for "Tales...", while Atsushi Sato, known as ats-, from the group HΛL performed the instrumentals.

While "Lovely♡Cat's Eye" was not used as an opening to one of the Tales of video games, it was used in promotional advertisements for Tales of the Tempest, of which "VS" was the theme song. The EP did not contain the single version, instead harboring the rendition that was placed on her studio album Never+Land, "Lovely♡Cat's Eye ~Neko wa Kotatsu de Maruku Naranai no Maki~."

For the album's cover, misono is drawn to be a character in the Tales of series, with Collette Brunel and Lloyd Irving from Tales of Symphonia in the background.

== Track listing ==
CD
No.	Title	Lyrics	Music	Arranger(s)	Length
1.	"Starry Heavens"	misono	Mitsuru Igarashi • day after tomorrow	Daisuke Suzuki	4:48
2.	"Soshite Boku ni Dekiru Koto"	Mitsuru Igarashi	Mitsuru Igarashi • day after tomorrow	Daisuke Suzuki	4:11
3.	"VS"	misono	Susumu Nishikawa	Takahiro Izutani	4:17
4.	"Lovely♡Cat's Eye ~Neko wa Kotatsu de Maruku Naranai no Maki~"	misono	Susumu Nishikawa	Takahiro Izutani	4:29
5.	"Ninin Sankyaku"	misono	PLECTRUM	Akio Shimizu	4:30
6.	"Tales..."	misono	ats-	misono	4:43

DVD
No.	Title	Length
1.	"Starry Heavens" (Tales of Symphonia GameCube Opening Movie)	2:02
2.	"Soshite Boku ni Dekiru Koto" (Tales of Symphonia PlayStation 2 Opening Movie)	2:12
3.	"VS" (Tales of the Tempest Opening Movie)	2:02
4.	"Ninin Sankyaku" (Tales of Symphonia -Knight of Ratatosk- Opening Movie)	2:28
5.	"Tales with misono−BEST− Video Medley" (Starry Heavens~Soshite Boku ni Dekiru Koto~VS~Lovely♡Cat's Eye~Ninin Sankyaku)

== Charts ==
=== Oricon sales chart ===
Release	Chart	Peak position	Sales total
June 10, 2009	Oricon Weekly Albums Chart	21	12,708
