= Cover Album (album) =

Studio album by misono
- Released: September 23, 2009
- Recorded: 2009
- Genre: J-Pop
- Label: Avex Trax

Misono chronology
Tales with Misono: Best (2009)	Cover Album (2009)	Cover Album 2 (2010)

Cover Album (カバALBUM, Kaba Arubamu) is the first cover album and second mini-album released by Japanese soloist misono. The album's title is a play on "kaba" (カバ), the Japanese word for hippopotamus. It charted on Oricon at No. 28 and remained on the charts for four weeks. The album was released on the same day as her fourteenth single, Urusei Yatsura no Theme: Lum no Love Song/Me.

The album was released solely as a CD, although a music video for the first song, "misono to Utaou! Animedley I", was placed on the aforementioned single.

For the album, misono covered a variety of songs from other artists, including Avril Lavigne's "Complicated", Mayo Okamoto's "Tomorrow" and Personz's "Dear Friends".

== Information ==
Cover Album is the first cover album released by Japanese singer-songwriter misono on September 23, 2009. The album peaked at No. 28 on the Oricon Albums Charts, remaining on the charts for four consecutive weeks. The album was released the same day as her single Urusei Yatsura no Theme ~Lum no Love Song~／「Mii」, of which the a-side was also a cover song.

While the album was only released on a standard CD, the first track, "misono to Utaou! Animedley I" (misonoと歌おう!アニメドレーI / Sing with misono! Animedley I), was given a music video on the CD+DVD version of Urusei Yatsura no Theme: Lum no Love Song/Me.

misono had her own version of Mayo Okamoto's "Tomorrow" on her single Lovely♡Cat's Eye, which was released three years earlier in November 2006. Her rendition of "Complicated" had been used on the Avril Lavigne tribute album Tribute to Avril Lavigne -Master's Collection- (2006), in which various Japanese artists covered several songs by the Canadian artist.

misono's sister, Koda Kumi, would later cover some of the same songs, including Ouyang Fei Fei's "Love Is Over" (ラヴ・イズ・オーヴァー) on her Eternity ~Love & Songs~ album (2010), and Linda Yamamoto's "Dou ni mo tomaranai" on her Color the Cover album (2013).

== Track listing ==
CD
No.	Title	Lyrics	Music	Original	Length
1.	"misono to Utaou! Animedley I 〜Urusei Yatsura no Theme ~Lum no Love Song~ / CAT'S EYE / Wai Wai World / Candy Candy / Attack No.1 Theme / Hajimete no Chuu〜" (misonoと歌おう!アニメドレーI)				6:05
2.	"Playback Part 2" (プレイバック)	Yoko Aki	Ryudo Uzaki	Momoe Yamaguchi	3:19
3.	"Dou ni mo Tomaranai" (どうにもとまらない / I Won't Stop)	Yū Aku	Shunichi Tokura	Linda Yamamoto	2:48
4.	"Love Is Over" (ラヴ・イズ・オーヴァー)	Kaoru Ito	Kaoru Ito	Ouyang Fei Fei • Coldfeet	4:44
5.	"misono to Utaou! Animedley II 〜Anpanman no Maachi / Delicate ni Suki Shite / Unbalance na Kiss o Shite / Tonichankan-Chin Ikkyū-san / Touch / Omoide ga Ippai〜" (misonoと歌おう!アニメドレーII)				6:41
6.	"TOMORROW"	Mayo Okamoto	Mayo Okamoto	Mayo Okamoto	4:15
7.	"Complicated"	Avril Lavigne	Avril Lavigne • Lauren Christy • Scott Spock • Graham Edwards	Avril Lavigne	4:28
8.	"DEAR FRIENDS"	JILL	Mitsugu Watanabe	Personz	6:42
9.	"gradually"	misono	Mitsuru Igarashi • Kotaro Kubota	day after tomorrow	5:29

== Charts (Japan) ==
Release	Chart	Peak position	Total sales
September 23, 2009	Oricon Weekly Charts	28	7,016
