= Ninin Sankyaku =

Single by misono

from the album Sei -say-
- B-side: "Rock Project Medley (Zasetsu Chiten/Juunin Toiro/Mugen Kigen/Ninin Sankyaku)"
- Released: June 28, 2008
- Recorded: 2007
- Genre: J-Pop, Rock
- Label: Avex Trax
- Songwriter: misono

Misono singles chronology
"Mugen Kigen" (2008)	"Ninin Sankyaku" (2008)	"Kazoku no Hi" (2008)

Alternative cover
- "Tales of Symphonia Dawn of The New World" CD-Only Cover

Ninin Sankyaku (二人三脚 / Three-Legged Race) in the tenth single by Japanese soloist misono, and the final single released for her Rock Singles Project. Out of the singles for the project, Ninin Sankyaku was the most successful on the charts, ranking at No. 10 on Oricon and remaining on the charts for ten weeks.

The single was released as both a CD and a CD+DVD combo, with the Tales of Symphonia: Dawn of the New World editions also garnering CD and CD+DVD combos. As with the other singles in the project, which misono performed with other bands, the music for "Ninin Sankyaku" was written and performed by Akio Shimizu from Anthem.

== Information ==
Ninin Sankyaku is the tenth single by Japanese singer-songwriter misono. It was her final single released for her Rock Singles Project, a project in which she would release four rock-themed singles performed and produced by four different Japanese rock bands. For "Ninin Sankyaku," she worked with the electric guitarist of the 1980s rock band Anthem, Akio Shimizu.

The single became her most successful in the project, charting at No. 10 on the Oricon Singles Charts and remaining on the charts for ten consecutive weeks. It was released in two editions: standard CD and a CD+DVD combo. The Tales of Symphonia: Dawn of the New World versions harbored alternate cover art, front-facing the characters from the series. The CD portion carried the title track, along with its instrumental, and a medley of the songs used in her Rock Singles Project. The animated openings from all of the gaming platforms Tales of Symphonia: Dawn of the New World was released on were placed on the DVD – this included the Wii, PlayStation 2, GameCube and the Nintendo DS versions. misono would later release a live-action music video for "Ninin Sankyaku" on the corresponding album Sei -say-.

For the single's title track, misono worked with Anthem's electric guitarist Akio Shimizu. Akio wrote and composed the music, while the Japanese indie rock band PLECTRUM performed the instrumentals. As with the other tracks in the project, misono wrote the lyrical portion.

"Ninin Sankyaku" was used as the theme song for the role-playing video game Tales of Symphonia: Dawn of the New World, (known as Tales of Symphonia: Knight of Ratatosk in Japan). This became the third song by misono to be used in a Tales of video game, her first being "VS," which was the opening theme to the Tales of the Tempest action role-playing game, and the second being "Lovely♡Cat's Eye," which was used to help promote the same title.

"Ninin Sankyaku" would later be placed on her first compilation album Tales with misono -Best-, along with the other songs she performed in the Tales of series, including those she did during her time in the band day after tomorrow.

== Promotional advertisements ==
"Ninin Sankyaku" was used as the theme song for the Tales of Symphonia spin-off Tales of Symphonia: Dawn of the New World. This became her second song to be used as a theme song in the Tales of series, and the third to be used in the series overall. Her previous songs that were used in the series were "VS" and "Lovely♡Cat's Eye."

Along with being the title track to the role-playing video game, the title track was also used as the ending theme to the television series Shimuraya Desu (志村屋です。 / It's Shimuraya) throughout the month of June.

== Track listing ==
CD
No.	Title	Lyrics	Music	Arranger(s)	Length
1.	"Ninin Sankyaku" (二人三脚 / Three-Legged Race)	misono	PLECTRUM	Akio Shimizu	4:30
2.	"Rock Project Medley" (Zasetsu Chiten~Juunin Toiro~Mugen Kigen~Ninin Sankyaku)	misono	Hinata Hidekazu • GO!GO!7188 • onso9line • Tanahashi "UNA" Nobuhito • PLECTRUM	Hinata Hidekazu • Yumi Nakashima • Yoshiyuki Fujii • Akio Shimizu	9:28
3.	"Ninin Sankyaku" (Instrumental)		PLECTRUM	Akio Shimizu	4:28

DVD
No.	Title	Length
1.	"Ninin Sankyaku (Tales of Symphonia: Knight of Ratatosk ver.)" (Video Clip)
2.	"GameCube "Tales of Symphonia" Opening Animation Movie"
3.	"PlayStation 2 "Tales of Symphonia" Opening Animation Movie"
4.	"Nintendo DS "Tales of the Tempest" Opening Movie"
5.	"misono "Tales of" Series Tie-In Songs • Special Video Clip Medley" (Starry Heavens～Soshite Boku Ni Dekiru Koto～VS～Lovely♡Cat's Eye)

== Charts ==
=== Oricon sales chart (Japan) ===
(Source)

Release	Chart	Peak position	Sales total	Chart run
June 28, 2008	Oricon Daily Singles Chart	10	12,870 copies	
June 28, 2008	Oricon Weekly Singles Chart	10	27,595 copies	10 weeks
June 28, 2008	Oricon Monthly Singles Chart			
