= Urusei Yatsura no Theme: Lum no Love Song/Me =

"Urusei Yatsura no Theme ~Lum no Love Song~／"Me""

Single by misono

from the album Cover Album and Me
- B-side: "Me"
- Released: September 23, 2009
- Recorded: 2009
- Genre: J-Pop
- Label: Avex Trax
- Songwriter: misono

Misono singles chronology
"End=Start/Shūten (Kimi no Ude no Naka)" (2009)	"Urusei Yatsura no Theme; ~Lum no Love Song~／"Me"" (2009)	"Watashi Iro/Bokura Style" (2009)

Urusei Yatsura no Theme ~Lum no Love Song~／「Mii」 (うる星やつらのテーマ～ラムのラブソング～／「ミィ」 / Theme of Urusei Yatsura ~Love Song of Lum~/"Me") is the fourteenth single released by Japanese artist misono on September 23, 2009. The single was released the same day as her first cover album Cover Album. The single charted well on Oricon, taking the #18 position for the week; however, the single only remained on the charts for two weeks.

The first track, "Urusei Yatsura no Theme ~Lum no Love Song~", was a cover of Yuko Matsutani's song of the same name. The original song was used as the theme song for the anime Urusei Yatsura in the 1980s.

== Information ==
On September 23, 2009, Japanese artist misono released her fourteenth single under the avex label, Urusei Yatsura no Theme ~Lum no Love Song~／「Mii」. The single was released the same day as her first mini and cover album, aptly titled, Cover Album The single peaked in the top 20 on the Oricon Singles Charts, coming in at #18 and remaining on the charts for two consecutive weeks.

Urusei Yatsura no Theme ~Lum no Love Song~／「Mii」 was released in two editions: CD and a CD+DVD combo. The CD came with both a-sides, along with their corresponding instrumentals. The DVD contained the music video for "Urusei Yatsura no Theme ~Lum no Love Song~", but omitted the video for the other a-side, "「Mii」". Instead, the video "misono to Utaou! AniMedley I" (misonoと歌おう！アニメドレーI / Sing with misono! Animedley I) was included. The song for the video came from the same-day released album Cover Album.

The single's first a-side, "Urusei Yatsura no Theme ~Lum no Love Song~", was a cover of Yuko Matsutani's song "Lum no Love Song," originally released on October 21, 1981. The original song was used as the theme song to the 1980s anime Urusei Yatsura between 1981 and 1983. While the original composition was created by Izumi Kobayashi, Diamond Head's Susumu Nishikawa reworked and performed the instrumentals to misono's version to give it a more modern vibe. Susumu had previously worked with misono for several of her songs, including "Lovely♡Cat's Eye," "VS" and "Kodomo no Jijō>Otona no Shijō²." For the other a-side, "「Mii」" (「ミィ」 / "Me"), misono worked with indie rock band PLECTRUM's guitarist Akira Fujita, who performed the music. misono had worked with PLECTRUM prior for her single Ninin Sankyaku during her Rock Singles Project.

When misono was asked during an interview on Sukkiri!! why she chose to cover Yuko Matsutani's song "Lum no Love Song," misono had responded how she saw the success her sister, Kumi Koda, received after she covered the 1980s anime theme song, "Cutie Honey." She said how she hoped her single would sell well if she also covered a popular anime theme song.

misono would release an alternative version of "「Mii」" on the single's corresponding studio album Me.

== Music video ==
Despite being an a-side, "「Mii」" did not receive a music video on the single or the corresponding album Me.

For "Urusei Yatsura no Theme ~Lum no Love Song~", misono is shown wearing pink slip lingerie while being filmed on a rotating stage. Much like her sister, Kumi Koda's, music video for "Cutie Honey," the music video begins with a television turning on. Other similarities between the videos including a musical rift where misono takes off her lingerie to reveal her bikini. This is not unlike the rift in her sister's video, where Kumi is shown in seductive clothing while she dances on a bar. The video ends with the television showing misono donning several different outfits. The ending leads into the next music video.

The video for "misono to Utaou! AniMedley I" beings with the same television from the previous video turning on to show misono wearing the bikini from "Urusei Yatsura no Theme ~Lum no Love Song~". Throughout the video, misono dons a different outfit for each song in the medley. This includes a black crop top and cat ears for "Cat's Eye" by Anri, pigtails and glasses for "Wai Wai World" by Ado Mizumori, a sundress for "Candy♥Candy" by Mitsuko Horie, a pinafore / jumper for "Attack No.1" by Kumiko Ōsugi, and a vest and headband for "Hajimete no Chuu" by Anshin Papa.

== Track listing ==
CD
No.	Title	Lyrics	Music	Arranger(s)	Length
1.	"Urusei Yatsura no Theme ~Lum no Love Song~" (うる星やつらのテーマ～ラムのラブソング～ / Theme of Urusei Yatsura ~Love Song of Lum~)	Akira Itou	Susumu Nishikawa	Izumi Kobayashi	3:00
2.	"「Mii」" (「ミィ」 / "Me")	misono	Akira Fujita	misono	4:07
3.	"Urusei Yatsura no Theme ~Lum no Love Song~" (Instrumental)		Susumu Nishikawa	Izumi Kobayashi	3:00
4.	"「Mii」" (Instrumental)		Akira Fujita	misono	4:01

DVD
No.	Title	Length
1.	"Urusei Yatsura no Theme ~Lum no Love Song~" (Video Clip)	2:59
2.	"misono to Utaou! AniMedley I" (Video Clip)	6:05

== Charts ==
=== Oricon Sales Chart ===
Release	Chart	Peak Position	First Day/Week Sales	Sales Total	Chart Run
September 23, 2009	Oricon Daily Singles Chart	10			
September 23, 2009	Oricon Weekly Singles Chart	18	4,162	4,824	
