= The Day After Tomorrow (disambiguation) =

The Day After Tomorrow is a 2004 science-fiction disaster film by Roland Emmerich.

The Day After Tomorrow may also refer to:

== Literature ==
- The Day After To-Morrow; or, Fata Morgana, an 1858 book by William Bainbridge
- "The Day After Tomorrow", an 1887 essay by Robert Louis Stevenson
- Meg Langholme; or, The Day After To-morrow, an 1897 novel by Mary Louisa Molesworth
- The Day After To-Morrow, a 1911 feminist utopian science fiction novel by Cora Minnett
- The Day After To-Morrow, a 1928 book by Philip Gibbs
- Sixth Column or The Day After Tomorrow, a 1949 novel by Robert Heinlein
- The Day After Tomorrow, a 1956 novel by Roy Farran
- The Day After Tomorrow (novel), a 1994 novel by Allan Folsom
- The Day After Tomorrow, a 2004 novel by Whitley Strieber, the novelization of the Emmerich film

== Music ==
- Day After Tomorrow (band), a J-Pop band
- Day After Tomorrow (Day After Tomorrow album), 2002
- Day After Tomorrow (Joan Baez album), 2008
- The Day After Tomorrow (Maino album), 2012
- "The Day After Tomorrow", a 2010 song by David Archuleta from The Other Side of Down
- "The Day After Tomorrow", a 2002 song by Saybia from The Second You Sleep
- "The Day After Tomorrow", a 1995 song by Take That from Nobody Else
- "Day After Tomorrow", a 2004 song by Tom Waits from Real Gone

== Film and television ==
- Day After Tomorrow (film), a 1968 Italian Spaghetti Western film
- "The Day After Tomorrow" (The O.C.), an episode of The O.C.
- The Day After Tomorrow (TV special), a 1975 television pilot

== See also ==
- The Day After (disambiguation)
- The Day Before Tomorrow, a 1956 Australian play by Ric Throssell
- A Day Before Tomorrow, a 2006 Nightwish concert film
