= Me (Misono album) =

Studio album by misono
- Released: June 30, 2010
- Recorded: 2008–2010
- Genre: J-pop, pop rock
- Label: avex trax AVCD-38110 (Japan, CD); AVCD-38109/B (Japan, CD+DVD); AVC1-38112/B (Japan, FC CD+DVD)

Misono chronology
Cover Album 2 (2010)	Me (2010)	symphony with misono Best (2013)

Alternative covers
- CD+DVD

Alternative cover
- Limited Edition

Singles from Me
- 1. "Kazoku no Hi/Aburazemi Mesu" Released: October 29, 2008; 2. "Kyūkon (Yaruki, Genki, Sono Ki no Nekko)/?cm" Released: February 25, 2009; 3. "Urusei Yatsura no Theme: Lum no Love Song/Me" Released: September 23, 2009; 4. "End=Start/Shūten (Kimi no Ude no Naka)" Released: June 10, 2009; 5. "Watashi Iro/Bokura Style" Released: November 25, 2009; 6. "...Suki ×××/0-ji Mae no Tsunderella" Released: May 5, 2010

Me is the third studio album by Japanese singer Misono, released on June 30, 2010. The album was released in three different formats: CD only, CD+DVD, and a limited edition.

The album was preceded in release by seven singles.

== Background ==
Me is the third studio album by Japanese pop/rock artist misono. The album became her first to be released under the pseudonym "Me." She would do this again for her following singles and next studio album, Uchi. Me debuted on the Oricon Albums Charts art #14, but dropped to #35 by the end of the first week, giving the album a weekly ranking at #20. The album dropped to #146 by the end of the second week before falling off the charts. The album was released as a standard CD, CD+DVD and a CD+DVD edition for her fan club. The fan club editions contained different material on the DVD portion, along with the "Dialogue" (Serifu / 台詞) version of the final track, "Last Time ~Romeo Juliet~."

The cover art for the album was in collaboration with Kitty Ex (KITTY EX) and designed by Garcia Marquez. The album contained very little new material, as had been the case with her previous albums Say -sei- (2008) and never+land (2007). For Me, there were three new tracks: "Usotsuki Tane" (ウソツキ種 / Liar Seed), "Joker" and "Last Time ~Romeo Juliet~."

Me contained the track "Tenbin ~Tsuyogari na Watashi×Yowagari na Kimi~," which was the coupling track on her collaboration single It's all Love!. "It's all Love!" had been performed with her sister Kumi Koda back in March 2009. The album also carried misono's most popular ballad "0-ji Mae no Tsunderella" (0時前のツンデレラ / Cinderella Before Midnight). The song was about the princess Cinderella hoping that the prince would find her and save her from her life with her stepmother and stepsisters. Her sister Kumi would later cover the song on her album Eternity ~Love & Songs~ released in October the same year.

== Track listing ==
All lyrics are written by misono

CD
No.	Title	Music	Length
1.	"Tales..." (Me Ver.)	ats-	4:37
2.	"Kyuukon ~Yaruki・Genki・Sono Ki no Nekko~"	Koutaro Kubota	3:56
3.	"「…Suki×××」"	Ihashi Naruya • Susumu Nishikawa	4:18
4.	"Usotsuki Tane" (ウソツキ種)	Koichiro Noguchi
5.	"0-ji Mae no Tsunderella"	Akira Murata • Susumu Nishikawa
6.	"Joker"	Sakura Yuugo • Susumu Nishikawa
7.	"Tenbin ~Tsuyogari na Watashi×Yowagari na Kimi~"	misono • Kotaro Kubota
8.	"11 eleven ~ end=Start"	Masato Kitano • Kotaro Kubota • Susumu Nishikawa
9.	"Shuuten ~Kimi no Ude no Naka~"	Miki Fujisue • Toru Watanabe
10.	"Watashi Iro"	Kohmi Hirose • Shinjiro Inoue
11.	"?cm" (misono to Ninin Sankyaku! Partner Ver.)	misono • Kotaro Kubota
12.	"music letter" (Me Ver.)	misono • Kento Ohgiya
13.	"Kazoku no Hi"	George Tokoro • Shinjiro Inoue
14.	"「Mii」" (Me Ver.)	misono • Fujita Akira
15.	"Last Time ~Romeo Juliet~" (ラストタイム～ロミジュリ～)	misono

DVD
No.	Title	Length
1.	"Watashi Iro" (Music Video)
2.	"Finger 5 Medley" (Gakuensai Live Tour Ver.)
3.	"Rock Project Medley" (第1回ファンクラブ準備室 / 1st Fan Club Preparation Room (Tentative) Live Event Ver.)
4.	"「Me」" (1st Fan Club Preparation Room (Tentative) Live Event Ver.)
5.	"Aburazemi♀ (Osaka Version) -Piano Version-" (1st Fan Club Preparation Room (Tentative) Live Event Ver.)

Limited Edition DVD
No.	Title	Length
1.	"Watashi Iro" (Music Video)
2.	"end=Start" (4 misono's Version)
3.	"misono to Ninin Sankyaku! Partner Boshuu Audition ~Recording no Maki~" (misonoと二人三脚!パートナー募集オーディション～レコーディングの巻～ / misono and Two Tripod Partners! Auditions Wanted ~Volume Recording~)
