= Day After Tomorrow II =

Studio album by Day After Tomorrow
- Released: 20 November 2002
- Genre: J-pop
- Length: 27:47
- Label: Avex Trax
- Producer: Max Matsuura

Day After Tomorrow chronology
Day After Tomorrow (2002)	Day After Tomorrow II (2002)	Elements (2003)

Day After Tomorrow II is the second studio album by Japanese J-pop band Day After Tomorrow. It peaked at number 3 on Oricon Albums Chart.

== Track listing ==
All tracks are written by Misono Kōda.

No.	Title	Length
1.	"Futurity"	4:27
2.	"Rosy Girl"	4:05
3.	"My Faith"	5:10
4.	"Hello, Everybody！"	3:49
5.	"Melody"	5:17
6.	"After All..."	4:52

== Personnel ==
- Misono Kōda – vocals
- Masato Kitano – guitar
- Daisuke Suzuki – keyboard
