= ...Suki xxx/0-ji Mae no Tsunderella =

2010 single by Misono

"「...Suki×××」/ 0-ji Mae no Cinderella"

Single by misono

from the album Me
- B-side: Kimi to Watashi no Uta ~misono to Ninin Sankyaku! Partner Ver.~; music letter ~misono to Ninin Sankyaku! Partner Ver.~
- Released: May 5, 2010
- Genre: J-pop, pop/rock
- Label: Avex Trax (Japan)

Misono singles chronology
"'Watashi Iro/Bokura Style'" (2009)	"「...Suki×××」/ 0-ji Mae no Cinderella" (2010)	"'Hontouso/Sukirai'" (2011)

「...Suki×××」/0-ji Mae no Cinderella ~Piano Ver.~ (「...好き×××」/0時前のツンデレラ 〜Piano Ver．〜 / "...Like×××"/Cinderella Before Midnight) is the last single released by Japanese soloist misono for her studio album Me, and her sixteenth overall single. The single was released in CD, CD+DVD and a fan club CD+DVD edition.

The single charted at #15 for the weekly ranking on the Oricon charts and remained on the charts for two consecutive weeks.

== Background ==
「...Suki×××」/0-ji Mae no Cinderella ~Piano Ver.~ is the sixteenth single released by Japanese pop/rock artist misono. It became her sixth consecutive double a-side release. The single peaked at #8 on the daily Oricon Singles Charts, but dropped in rank to take the #15 spot, staying on the charts for two weeks.

It was released in three editions: CD, CD+DVD and a Fan Club Edition of the CD+DVD combo. For the fan club edition, the track list differed on both the CD and the DVD. For the DVD, another video was placed on the track list, the recruiting review video for "Ninin Sankyaku" (misonoと二人三脚! パートナー募集オーディション～第1次・2次・3次審査の巻～ / misono and Ninin Sankyaku! Partner Recruitment Audition ~Volume 1st • 2nd • 3rd Reviews~). The CD portion not only contained both a-sides and their corresponding instrumentals, but also alternate versions to her songs "Kimi to Watashi no Uta" and "music letter."

The single contained the grunge/pop song "「...Suki×××」," which was written and arranged by musical composers Susumu Nishikawa of Diamond Head and Ihashi Naruya. Susumu had previously worked with misono during her time in the group day after tomorrow. Ihashi Naruya also composed the music for the other a-side, "0-ji Mae no Tsunderella." Akira Murata, who was in Diamond Head with Susumu Nishikawa, arranged the piece. The song "「...Suki×××」" is about enjoying living life while being without a partner, but wondering how things would have turned out if they had been older and more mature. In contrast, "0-ji Mae no Tsunderella" was a song about how the fictional character Cinderella had felt after going to the ball and meeting the prince. The take was most likely from the 1950 cinematic Disney version of the fairy tale.

"0-ji Mae no Cinderella" was used as the April ending theme to the television program Hiro Obi!, which aired on the Tokyo Broadcasting station.

misono's older sister, Koda Kumi, would later cover the song "0-ji Mae no Cinderella" on her cover album, Eternity ~Love & Songs~, which was released in October of the same year.

== Music video ==
The music video for "「...Suki×××」" carried an overall grunge theme, with misono in several locations many United States and United Kingdom videos used in the early-to-late 1990s. These included a rundown skatepark and the inside of a building under construction. The video used low-lighting, along with a spotlight, something her sister, Koda Kumi also utilized for her song "Physical Thing," which was released the same year.

Her video for "0-ji Mae no Cinderella" was performed in one continuous shot with misono sitting on a giant, white clock, symbolizing midnight in the story of Cinderella.

== Track listing ==
CD
No.	Title	Lyrics	Music	Arranger(s)	Length
1.	"「...Suki×××」" (「・・・好き×××」 / "...Like ×××")	misono	Susumu Nishikawa	Ihashi Naruya
2.	"0-ji Mae no Cinderella ~Piano Ver.~" (0時前のツンデレラ / Cinderella Before Midnight)	misono	Akira Murata	Ihashi Naruya
3.	"「...Suki×××」" (Instrumental)		Susumu Nishikawa	Ihashi Naruya
4.	"0-ji Mae no Cinderella" (Instrumental)		Akira Murata	Ihashi Naruya

DVD
No.	Title	Length
1.	"「...Suki×××」" (Video Clip)
2.	"0-ji Mae no Cinderella" (Video Clip)
3.	"「...Suki×××」/0-ji Mae no Cinderella" (TV Spot 15sec + 30 sec)

Fan Club CD
No.	Title	Lyrics	Music	Arranger(s)	Length
1.	"「...Suki×××」"	misono	Susumu Nishikawa	Ihashi Naruya
2.	"0-ji Mae no Cinderella ~Piano Ver.~"	misono	Akira Murata	Ihashi Naruya
3.	"Kimi to Watashi no Uta" (misono to Ninin Sankyaku! Partner Ver.)	misono	misono	misono
4.	"music letter" (misono to Ninin Sankyaku! Partner Ver.)	misono	Kento Ohgiya	misono
5.	"「...Suki×××」" (Instrumental)		Susumu Nishikawa	Ihashi Naruya
6.	"0-ji Mae no Cinderella" (Instrumental)		Akira Murata	Ihashi Naruya

Fan Club DVD
No.	Title	Length
1.	"「...Suki×××」" (Video Clip)
2.	"0-ji Mae no Cinderella" (Video Clip)
3.	"misono to Ninin Sankyaku! Partner Boshuu Audition ~Dai 1-ji • 2-ji • 3-ji Shinsa no Maki~" (misonoと二人三脚! パートナー募集オーディション～第1次・2次・3次審査の巻～ / misono and Ninin Sankyaku! Partner Recruitment Audition ~Volume 1st • 2nd • 3rd Reviews~)
4.	"「...Suki×××」/0-ji Mae no Cinderella" (TV Spot 15sec + 30 sec)

== Charts ==
Oricon Sales Chart (Japan)

Release	Chart	Peak position	Weekly Sales	Sales total	Chart run
2010.05.05	Oricon Weekly Charts	15	5,489	5,489	
2010.05.05	Oricon Weekly Charts	76	1,172	6,661	2 weeks
