= End=Start/Shūten (Kimi no Ude no Naka) =

"end=START Shuuten ~Kimi no Ude no Naka~"

Single by misono

from the album Me
- B-side: "Shuuten ~Kimi no ude no Naka~"
- Released: June 10, 2009
- Recorded: 2009
- Genre: J-Pop, pop/rock
- Label: Avex Trax
- Songwriter(s): misono

Misono singles chronology
"It's All Love!" (2009)	"end=START; Shuuten ~Kimi no Ude no Naka~" (2009)	"Urusei Yatsura no Theme: Lum no Love Song/Me" (2009)

end=Start / Shuuten ~Kimi no Ude no Naka~ (終点〜君の腕の中〜 / End Point ~In Your Arms~) is the thirteenth single by Japanese pop/rock artist misono. The single charted at No. 19 on the Oricon charts and remained on the charts for three weeks.

The coupling track "Shuuten ~Kimi no Ude no Naka~" was used as the ending theme for the feature film The Harimaya Bridge, in which misono acted in the role of Saita Nakayama.

== Information ==
end=START / Shuuten ~Kimi no Ude no Naka~ is the thirteenth single by Japanese singer-songwriter misono under the Avex label Avex Trax. The single charted in the top twenty of the Oricon Singles Charts at No. 19 and remained on the charts for three consecutive weeks.

"end=START" was written and composed by Diamond Head's composer and electric guitarist Susumu Nishikawa. misono had previously worked with Susumu for her debut song "VS," "Lovely Cat's Eye" and "Hot Time," among others. misono wrote the lyrical portion, however.

The coupling track, "Shuuten ~Kimi no Ude no Naka~," was composed by Miki Fujisue, who is well known for his musical arrangements for anime. He wrote and composed the theme songs for the anime adaptations of the manga D.Gray-man, Hayate the Combat Butler and Yoshinaga-san Chi no Gargoyle. The piece was performed by Toru Watanabe, who had also worked with misono's older sister, Koda Kumi, for the songs "Birthday Eve," "Hot Stuff," "you" and "Butterfly." As with "end=START," misono wrote the lyrics.

"Shuuten ~Kimi no Ude no Naka~" was used as the ending theme for the feature film The Harimaya Bridge, in which misono acted in the role of Saita Nakayama.

== Track listing ==
CD
No.	Title	Lyrics	Music	Arranger(s)	Length
1.	"end=START"	misono	Susumu Nishikawa	Susumu Nishikawa
2.	"Shuuten ~Kimi no Ude no Naka~" (終点〜君の腕の中〜 / End Point ~In Your Arms~)	misono	Toru Watanabe	Miki Fujisue
3.	"end=START" (Instrumental)		Susumu Nishikawa	Susumu Nishikawa
4.	"Shuuten ~Kimi no Ude no Naka~" (Instrumental)		Toru Watanabe	Miki Fujisue

DVD
No.	Title	Length
1.	"end=START" (Music Video)
2.	"Tales..." (misono's Photo Edit)
3.	"end=START" (TV SPOT 15sec + 30sec SPOT)

== Charts ==
=== Oricon Sales chart ===
Release	Chart	Peak Position	First Day/Week Sales	Sales Total	Chart Run
June 10, 2009	Oricon Daily Singles Chart	14			
June 10, 2009	Oricon Weekly Singles Chart	19	4,924	6,654	
June 10, 2009	Oricon Monthly Singles Chart				
June 10, 2009	Oricon Yearly Singles Chart				
