= Kyūkon (Yaruki, Genki, Sono Ki no Nekko)/?cm =

"Kyuukon ~Yaruki•Genki•Sono Ki no Nekko~／?cm"

Single by misono

from the album Me
- Released: February 25, 2009
- Recorded: 2009
- Genre: J-Pop, Rock
- Label: Avex Trax
- Songwriter(s): misono

Misono singles chronology
"Kazoku no Hi/Aburazemi Mesu" (2009)	"Kyuukon ~Yaruki•Genki•Sono Ki no Nekko~／?cm" (2009)	"It's All Love!" (2009)

Alternative cover
- CD+DVD

Kyuukon ~Yaruki•Genki•Sono Ki no Nekko~ / ?cm (球魂〜やる気・元気・その木の根っこ〜／?cm / Soul Spheres ~Motivation•Energy•Root of Tree~) is the twelfth solo single by Japanese artist misono. The single was released on February 25, 2009, and debuted at No. 21 on the Oricon charts; however, by the end of the week, the single dropped in rank to claim the No. 40 spot, only staying on the charts for two weeks.

== Information ==
Kyuukon ~Yaruki•Genki•Sono Ki no Nekko~ / ?cm is the twelfth solo single by Japanese singer-songwriter misono. The single debuted on the Oricon Singles Charts at No. 21, but dropped in rank to No. 40 by the end of the first week, remaining on the charts for only two consecutive weeks.

Both a-sides were used as opening theme songs. "Kyuukon" was used as the opening theme to comedy film Elite Yankee Saburo, which was a film adaptation of the television show of the same name. The film was directed by horror/comedy director Yūdai Yamaguchi. "?cm" was used as the theme to Sakigake! Ongaku Bandzuke ~JET~ throughout the month of February, which aired on Fuji TV.

The single was released in two formats: CD and CD+DVD, with both versions harboring double cover art, a side for each song. The CD portion contained both a-sides and their corresponding instrumentals. Despite being a double a-side, only "Kyuukon" received a music video on the corresponding DVD. The other music video was of the song "Tenbin ~Tsuyogari na Watashi x Yowagari na Kimi~", which was later placed on the collaboration single she performed with her sister Kumi Koda, It's All Love!. Additionally, the following single omitted the music video.

"Kyuukon" and "?cm" were both written and composed by misono herself, along with the lyrics. The music was performed by Kotaro Kubota, who misono had worked with in the past for several of her songs, including her debut song "VS," "Pochi" and "Tomago." The track "Tenbin ~Tsuyogari na Watashi x Yowagari na Kimi~", which was only available on the DVD, was also written and composed by misono, with the instrumental portion being done by Kotaro.

"Kyuukon" (球魂) translates into the literal term "soul sphere." However, another word with the same pronunciation (球根) means "bulb." This is evidenced by the single's cover for "Kyuukon," which depicts a plant bulb and its roots burrowing into the ground.

== Promotional advertisements ==
To help promote the single, both "Kyuukon" and "?cm" were used as theme songs.

"Kyuukon" was used as the opening theme song for the film adaptation of the television comedy Elite Yankee Saburo, aptly titled Elite Yankee Saburo: The Movie (激情版 エリートヤンキー三郎 / Gekijouban: Eriito Yankii Saburou). The film was directed by Japanese film director Yūdai Yamaguchi. Yūdai is best known for directing gory and grotesque splatter films, mixed with "plain utter weirdness."

"?cm" was used as the opening theme for the Fuji TV program Sakigake! Ongaku Bandzuke ~JET~ (「魁!音楽番付〜JET〜」 / Sakigake! Music Rank ~JET~) throughout the month of February.

== Music videos ==
Despite being an a-side, "?cm" did not receive a music video. However, there was a music video for the track "Tenbin ~Tsuyogari na Watashi x Yowagari na Kimi~", the song of which was later placed on the single misono collaborated with her sister, Kumi Koda, for, It's All Love!.

The music video for "Kyuukon ~Yaruki•Genki•Sono Ki no Nekko~" begins with misono performing the song onstage on her electric guitar in front of a crowd, while strobe lights reflect around her. The video is also interspersed with scenes of misono in front of a white backdrop while the lyrics flash on screen.

The video for "Tenbin ~Tsuyogari na Watashi x Yowagari na Kimi~" is performed in one continuous shot with misono sitting on what appears to be an abandoned stage while she holds her guitar. She would later perform her music video for "0-ji Mae no Tsunderella" in one continuous shot, as well.

== Track listing ==
CD
No.	Title	Lyrics	Music	Arranger(s)	Length
1.	"Kyuukon ~Yaruki•Genki•Sono Ki no Nekko~" (球魂〜やる気・元気・その木の根っこ〜/ Soul Spheres ~Motivation•Energy•Root of Tree~)	misono	Kotaro Kubota	misono
2.	"?cm"	misono	Kotaro Kubota	misono
3.	"Kyuukon ~Yaruki•Genki•Sono Ki no Nekko~" (Instrumental)		Kotaro Kubota	misono
4.	"?cm" (Instrumental)		Kotaro Kubota	misono

DVD
No.	Title	Length
1.	"Kyuukon ~Yaruki•Genki•Sono Ki no Nekko~" (Video Clip)	3:56
2.	"Tenbin ~Tsuyogari na Watashi x Yowagari na Kimi~" (Video Clip)	4:39
