= Watashi Iro/Bokura Style =

"Watashi Iro / Bokura Style"

Single by misono

from the album Me
- B-side: "Gelaende ga Tokeru Hodo Koishitai"
- Released: November 25, 2009
- Recorded: 2009
- Genre: J-pop, pop/rock
- Label: Avex Trax
- Songwriter(s): misono

Misono singles chronology
| "Urusei Yatsura no Theme: Lum no Love Song/Me" (2009) | "Watashi Iro / Bokura Style" (2009) | "...Suki xxx/0-ji Mae no Tsunderella" (2010) |

Watashi Iro/Bokura Style (私色/僕らスタイル; My Color/Our Style) is the fifteenth single released by Japanese performer misono on November 25, 2009. It was released as both a standard CD and a CD+DVD, becoming her fifth consecutive double a-side. It charted low on Oricon at #34, remaining on the charts for four weeks.

The single followed the trend of other avex artists by having one melody split into two songs, a trend that had been started by misono's older sister Koda Kumi in 2006 with the single Yume no Uta/Futari de... (Ayumi Hamasaki had released her single Sunrise/Sunset ~Love Is All~ three months before misono in August).

== Information ==
Watashi Iro/Bokura Style is the fifteenth single released by Japanese pop/rock artist misono. It became her fifth consecutive double a-side, which began with her single Kazoku no Hi/Aburazemi Mesu, a trend she set for her upcoming studio album Me. The single failed to break into the top twenty on the Oricon Singles Charts, peaking at #34 and staying on the charts for four consecutive weeks.

The single was released in two editions: a standard CD and a CD+DVD combo pack. The CD portions on both versions held the two a-sides, the coupling track "Gelände ga Tokeru Hodo Koishitai" and the all three songs' corresponding instrumentals. Despite being a double a-side, the DVD only housed the music video for "Bokura Style", omitting "Watashi Iro", the latter of which would be placed on the single's corresponding studio album, Me. It also featured the television commercial for the single.

For the a-sides, the melody was split into two different songs with slight different arrangements and different lyrics. This was a trend that began in 2006 with the release of Koda Kumi's single Yume no Uta/Futari de..., in which Kumi suggested the song be split due to having happy and sad elements. "Watashi Iro" was an acoustic-based rock ballad, while "Bokura Style" was made into a fast-paced rock song. Throughout the year of 2009, several avex artists released similar concept songs, including Ayumi Hamasaki with Sunrise/Sunset ~Love is All~, which was released three months prior to Watashi Iro/Bokura Style.

"Gelände ga Tokeru Hodo Koishitai" is a cover of Kohmi Hirose's song of the same name, originally released in 1995 to critical success. misono collaborated with the Winter Queen for not only the cover of the song, but Kohmi also helped write, compose and perform both "Watashi Iro" and "Bokura Style" for the single.

== Track listing ==
CD
| No. | Title | Lyrics | Music | Length |
|---|---|---|---|---|
| 1. | "Watashi Iro" (私色 / My Color) | misono | misono • Kohmi Hirose • Shinjirou Inoue | 4:58 |
| 2. | "Bokura Style" (僕らスタイル / Our Style) | Kohmi Hirose | Kohmi Hirose • Susumu Nishikawa | 4:20 |
| 3. | "Gelände ga Tokeru Hodo Koishitai" (ゲレンデがとけるほど恋したい / I Want to Love You as Much as the Ski Slope Melts) | Kohmi Hirose | Kohmi Hirose • Susumu Nishikawa | 5:10 |
| 4. | "Watashi Iro" (Instrumental) | | misono • Kohmi Hirose • Shinjirou Inoue | 4:58 |
| 5. | "Bokura Style" (Instrumental) | | Kohmi Hirose • Susumu Nishikawa | 4:20 |
| 6. | "Gelände ga Tokeru Hodo Koishitai" (Instrumental) | | Kohmi Hirose • Susumu Nishikawa | 5:10 |

DVD
| No. | Title | Length |
|---|---|---|
| 1. | "Bokura Style" (Music Video) | 4:20 |
| 2. | "Watashi Iro/Bokura Style" (TV SPOT) | 0:15 |

== Chart ranking (Japan) ==
Oricon Sales Chart (Japan)

| Date | Title | Peak position | Weeks | Sales |
|---|---|---|---|---|
| 2009.11.25 | Oricon Daily Charts | 34 | | |
| 2009.11.25 | Oricon Weekly Charts | 79 | 4 weeks | 3,800 |
