= Selection Best =

Greatest hits album by Day After Tomorrow
- Released: September 20, 2006
- Genre: J-pop
- Length: 73:29
- Label: Avex Trax

Day After Tomorrow chronology
complete Best (2005)	Selection Best (2006)

Selection Best is the third greatest hits album by Japanese J-pop band Day After Tomorrow. It was released on September 20, 2006, by Avex Trax.

== Track listing ==
No.	Title	Length
1.	"Starry Heavens"
2.	"Faraway"
3.	"Soshite Boku ni Dekiru Koto"
4.	"My Faith"
5.	"Yuri no Hana"
6.	"Kimi to Aeta Kiseki"
7.	"Lost Angel"
8.	"For You"
9.	"Dear Friends"
10.	"Stay in My Heart"
11.	"Futurity"
12.	"Hotarubi"
13.	"Itazura na Kiss"
14.	"High-Spirit"
15.	"More than a Million Miles"
