= The Day After (disambiguation) =

The Day After is a 1983 American television film.

The Day After may also refer to:

- The Day After (1909 film), starring Blanche Sweet
- The Day After (2017 film), South Korean drama
- The Day After (album), 2005 release by Twista
- The Day After: Fight for Promised Land, alternate title for the 2005 video game Cuban Missile Crisis: The Aftermath
- "The Day After" (The Americans), a 2016 episode of the television series The Americans

== See also ==
- The Day After Tomorrow (disambiguation)
- The Day After Gettysburg, an alternate history novel
