= Right Here Waiting for You 2010 =

Promotional song for Expo 2010 Shanghai China

Song
- Language: Chinese
- English title: Right Here Waiting for You 2010
- Released: April 1, 2010
- Genre: Pop
- Songwriter: Miao Sen

"Right Here Waiting for You 2010" (Chinese: 2010等你来; pinyin: èr líng yī líng děng nǐ lái) was a promotional song for Expo 2010 Shanghai China, composed by Miao Sen (Chinese: 缪森). It was first released in the 30-day countdown on April 1, 2010.

Jackie Chan, Lang Lang, Yao Ming, Yang Lan, Andy Lau, Li Ning, Li Bingbing, and Liu Xiang appeared in the music video.

== Plagiarism claims ==
Allegedly, "Right Here Waiting for You 2010" was plagiarized from the 1997 Japanese song "Sonomama no Kimi de Ite" ("Stay the Way You Are") by Mayo Okamoto, resulting in its use as the Expo theme being suspended. After discussions with Okamoto's management, a compromise was reached such that "Sonomama no Kimi de Ite" is now the official song of the 2010 Expo.
