= Cover Album 2 =

Cover Album 2 カバALBUM2

Compilation album by Misono
- Released: January 27, 2010
- Recorded: 2010
- Genre: J-Pop
- Labels: Avex Trax; CD (AVCD-23962); Digital

Misono chronology
Cover Album (2009)	Cover Album 2 カバALBUM2 (2010)	Me (2010)

Cover Album 2 (カバALBUM2, Kaba Arubamu Tsū) is the second cover album and third mini-album by Japanese soloist misono. The album was released only a few months after her last tribute album, Cover Album. The album charted at #44 on the Oricon Albums Charts and remained on the charts for two weeks.

For the melodies on the album (tracks #2 and #5), misono chose the songs to sing from Japanese bands Ulfuls and Judy and Mary.

== Track listing ==
(via YesAsia)

CD
No.	Title	Lyrics	Original	Length
1.	"Tomorrow"	Martin Charnin; Translation: Kazuko Katagiri	Annie	3:25
2.	"misono ga Koibito ni Utatte Hoshii! Ulfuls Medley (Samurai Soul ~ Eenen ~ Banzai ~Suki de Yokatta~)" (misonoが恋人に歌ってほしい!ウルフルズメドレー (サムライソウル 〜 ええねん 〜 バンザイ 〜好きでよかった〜))	Ulfuls	Ulfuls	7:34
3.	"Amagi-goe" (天城越え / Beyond Amagi Pass)	Osamu Yoshioka	Sayuri Ishikawa	4:40
4.	"Watashi ga Obasan ni Natte mo" (私がオバさんになっても)	Chisato Moritaka	Chisato Moritaka	4:10
5.	"misono no Seishun Song! Medley ~motto • Music Fighter • Jesus! Jesus! • Lovely Baby • motto~" (misonoの青春ソング! メドレー)	Judy and Mary	Judy and Mary	6:45
6.	"Zurui Onna" (ズルい女 / Cunning Woman)	Tsunku	Sharam Q	4:03
7.	"Ah Mujou" (あゝ無情 / Ah Heart)	Reiko Yukawa	Ann Lewis	4:50
8.	"Ki no Kikanai Cake de Tanjoubi" (気のきかないケーキで誕生日 / Birthdays with an Unexpirable Cake)	George Tokoro	George Tokoro	3:03
9.	"Momen no Handkerchief" (木綿のハンカチーフ / Cotton Handkerchief)	Takashi Matsumoto	Hiromi Ōta	4:57

== Charts (Japan) ==
Release	Chart	Peak position
January 27, 2010	Oricon Weekly Charts	44
