= Kazoku no Hi/Aburazemi Mesu =

"Kazoku no Hi / Aburazemi♀ (Osaka Version) -Piano Version-"

Single by misono

from the album Me
- B-side: "music letter"
- Released: October 29, 2008
- Recorded: 2009
- Genre: J-Pop, pop/rock
- Label: Avex Trax
- Songwriter: misono

Misono singles chronology
"Ninin Sankyaku" (2008)	"Kazoku no Hi / Aburazemi♀ (Osaka Version) -Piano Version-" (2008)	"Kyūkon (Yaruki, Genki, Sono Ki no Nekko)/?cm" (2009)

Kazoku no Hi/Aburazemi♀ (Osaka Version) -Piano Version- (家族の日／アブラゼミ♀大阪バージョン）－ピアノ・バージョン－ / Family Day/Large Brown Cicada) is the eleventh single released by Japanese soloist misono. The single charted at No. 23 on the Oricon weekly charts and remained on the charts for three weeks.

== Information ==
Kazoku no Hi/Aburazemi♀ is the eleventh single by Japanese singer-songwriter misono. The single ranked at No. 23 on the Oricon Singles Charts and remained on the charts for three consecutive weeks. It was her first single released after her previous album, Sei -say-.

The single was released in both a standard CD and CD+DVD format. Despite being a double a-side, only "Kazoku no Hi" received a music video on the corresponding DVD. A live version for "Aburazemi♀" was later released on her third studio album Me.

"Kazoku no Hi" was written by George Tokoro, a Japanese comedian and songwriter, who is best known as the voice actor for Buzz Lightyear in Japan's release of the film Toy Story. The piece was performed by lyricist and sound producer Inoue Shinjiro. Inoue has also worked with misono's older sister, Kumi Koda, and famous South Korean group TVXQ. misono wrote the lyrics to "Kazoku no Hi" in tribute to her parents.

"Aburamezi♀" was composed by musical composer Kento Ohgiya and performed by artist Yuuki Yabuuchi (best known by her stage name "Yuki"). Kento would later work with famous artist Maaya Sakamoto for her song "Shiawase ni Tsuite Watashi ga Shitteiru Itsutsu no Hōhō" in 2015. The lyrics to the track were written by Shinsuke Shimada under his stage name "Kashiasu Shimada," making it misono's first a-side where she had not written her own lyrics. For the televised version of the song, which was used on the television show Quiz! Hexagon II, misono performed the song with Hiroshi Shinagawa, while Bungo Saito and Akiko Iwamura performed the instrumentals. In 2008, misono became a regular on the show.

The single's only b-side, "Music Letter" (stylized as music letter) was written and composed by misono herself, while Kento Ohgiya performed the music. An alternate version to the song was later placed on the corresponding album Me.

== Music video ==
Although being a main track, "Aburazemi♀" did not receive a music video on the single or the album. Instead, the only track to garner a video was "Kazoku no Hi."

For the music video, misono dons a wedding dress while waiting for the groom in a church. Throughout the video, misono shows pictures of her parents together, along with pictures of her and her sister Koda Kumi when they were little kids. Among the pictures she shares are those with her father while holding an award she received during her time in the band day after tomorrow. The video ends with her meeting with the groom and sharing a kiss after he lifts her veil

== Track listing ==
CD
No.	Title	Lyrics	Music	Arranger(s)	Length
1.	"Kazoku no Hi" (家族の日 / Family Day)	misono	George Tokoro	Shinjiro Inoue	5:23
2.	"Aburazemi♀ (Osaka Version) -Piano Version-" (アブラゼミ♀（大阪バージョン）－ピアノ・バージョン－ / Large Brown Cicada)	Shinsuke Shimada	Yuuki Yabuuchi (YUKI)	Kento Ohgiya	8:23
3.	"music letter"	misono	Kento Ohgiya	misono	6:12
4.	"Aburazemi♀ (Osaka Version) / misono & Hiroshi" (TV Size)	Shinsuke Shimada	Bungo Saito • Akiko Iwamura	Yuuki Yabuuchi (YUKI)	3:03
5.	"Kazoku no Hi" (Instrumental)		George Tokoro	Shinjiro Inoue	5:23

DVD
No.	Title	Length
1.	"Kazoku no Hi" (Video Clip)	5:28
2.	"misono Comment Video" (misonoコメント映像)
3.	"TV SPOT 15sec+30sec"	0:45

== Charts ==
Release	Chart	Peak position	Chart run
October 29, 2008	Oricon Weekly Singles Chart	23	3 weeks
