= It's All Love! =

"It's all Love!"

Single by Koda Kumi & misono

from the album Universe / Koda Kumi Me / misono
- Released: March 31, 2009
- Recorded: 2009
- Genre: J-pop, pop/rock
- Label: Rhythm Zone
- Songwriters: Koda Kumi, misono

Koda Kumi singles chronology
"stay with me" (2008)	"It's all Love!" (2009)	"3 Splash" (2009)

misono singles chronology
"Kyūkon (Yaruki, Genki, Sono Ki no Nekko)/?cm" (2009)	"It's all Love!" (2009)	"End=Start/Shūten (Kimi no Ude no Naka)" (2009)

Music video
- "It's all Love!" on YouTube

It's all Love! is a collaboration single by Japanese singer-songwriters Koda Kumi and misono. The single was originally set to be released on March 4, but was pushed back to its official release date of March 31, 2009.

The single charted at No. 1 on Oricon, making it Kumi's third consecutive number-one single and misono's first number-one single. It stayed on the charts for eleven weeks.

== Information ==
It's all Love! is a collaboration single between Japanese sisters Koda Kumi and misono. It charted No. 1 on the Oricon Singles Charts charts, becoming Kumi's third consecutive number-one single (seventh overall) and misono's first number-one single. It remained on the charts for eleven weeks.

It's all Love! became the first time a sibling collaborative effort charted since 1980's Dancing Sisters album by The Nolans.

The single had been long-awaited by Japanese fans, due to both Koda sisters being musicians under the same label, Avex, despite having differing musical styles. Kumi released music predominantly under the R&B and pop musical genres, while misono released music predominantly under the rock genre.

It was released as a standard CD, a CD+DVD combo and a limited edition fan club edition. At some local Tower Records stores, the single was paired with a poster as a first-come, first-served promotion.

Along with the sisters' collaboration song, there were two other songs on the single, each performed solo by each sister. "faarway" was performed by Koda Kumi and "Tenbin ~Tsuyogari na Watashi x Yowagari na Kimi~" (天秤~強がりな私×弱がりな君~ / Balance ~Strong Me x Weak You~) was performed by misono. However, only "faraway" contained a corresponding music video. misono had previously released the music video for "Tenbin ~Tsuyogari na Watashi x Yowagari na Kimi~" on her single Kyukon ~Yaruki•Genki•Sono Ki no Nekko~/?cm, although the song was not included on the CD.

Despite "It's all Love!" being a shared song, it was not placed on misono's corresponding album Me.

The single was certified Gold for shipment of 100,000 copies, and "It's all Love!" was certified platinum for full-length cellphone downloads.

== Packaging ==
It's all Love! was released in three editions: a standard CD, a CD+DVD combo and a limited fan club edition. The CD for the standard and combination editions featured the title track, the coupling tracks "faraway" and "Tenbin ~Tsuyogari na Watashi x Yowagari na Kimi~", along with the corresponding instrumentals for each song. The DVD housed music videos for "It's all Love!" and "faraway", along with the behind-the-scenes making video of "faraway".

The fan club edition carried the collaborative track and its instrumental, along with differing cover art.

== Promotional Advertisements ==
"It's all Love!" was used as the ending theme to Nippon TV's Sukkiri!! (スッキリ!! / Refreshed!!).

"faraway" was used as the theme for the film Subaru (昴), to which fellow label-mates TVXQ (Tohoshinki) performed the song "Bolero" in the film's bar scene. The movie is named after the ballerina lead named Subaru. It was released on March 20, 2009.

== Live performances ==
1. 03/27: Music Station Haru Special – It's all Love!, faraway
2. 06/04: Live Tour 2009 ~Trick~- It's all Love!

== Track list ==
=== Standard Edition ===
CD
No.	Title	Lyrics	Music	Arranger(s)	Length
1.	"It's all Love! (Koda Kumi x misono)"	Koda Kumi • misono	Kenichi Maeyamada	h-wonder
2.	"faraway (Koda Kumi)"	Koda Kumi	Mitsuki Shiokawa	Mitsuki Shiokawa
3.	"Tenbin ~Tsuyogari na Watashi x Yowagari na Kimi~ (misono)"	misono	misono	Kotaro Kubota
4.	"It's all Love!" (Instrumental)		Kenichi Maeyamada	h-wonder
5.	"faraway" (Instrumental)		Mitsuki Shiokawa	Mitsuki Shiokawa
6.	"Tenbin ~Tsuyogari na Watashi x Yowagari na Kimi~" (Instrumental)		Misono	Kotaro Kubota

DVD
No.	Title	Length
1.	"It's all Love!" (Music Video)
2.	"faraway" (Music Video)
3.	"faraway" (Making Video)

=== Prayroom Edition ===
CD: Limited Playroom Edition
No.	Title	Lyrics	Music	Arranger(s)	Length
1.	"It's all Love! (Koda Kumi x misono)"	Koda Kuml • misono	Kenichi Maeyamada	h-wonder
2.	"It's all Love!" (Instrumental)		Kenichi Maeyamada	h-wonder

== Charts ==
=== Oricon Sales Chart (Japan) ===
Release	Chart	Peak position	First week sales	Sales total	Chart run
March 31, 2009	Oricon Daily Charts	1			
March 31, 2009	Oricon Weekly Charts	1	74,014	99,429	8 Weeks
March 31, 2009	Oricon Monthly Charts	3			
March 31, 2009	Oricon Yearly Charts	61			

=== Various charts ===
Chart	Peak position
Billboard Japan Hot 100	1
RIAJ Digital Track Chart Top 100	1
