= Tales of Symphonia =

2003 video game

- North American GameCube box art
- Developer: Namco Tales Studio (Note: Ported to Windows by Other Ocean Interactive)
- Publisher: Namco
- Directors: Yoshito Higuchi; Kiyoshi Nagai; Eiji Kikuchi
- Producer: Makoto Yoshizumi
- Designer: Takashi Hasegawa
- Artist: Kōsuke Fujishima
- Writer: Takumi Miyajima
- Composers: Motoi Sakuraba; Shinji Tamura; Takeshi Arai
- Series: Tales
- Platforms: GameCube; PlayStation 2; PlayStation 3; Windows; Nintendo Switch; PlayStation 4; Xbox One
- Release: August 29, 2003: GameCube; JP: August 29, 2003; NA: July 13, 2004; AU: November 18, 2004; EU: November 19, 2004 PlayStation 2; JP: September 22, 2004 PlayStation 3; JP: October 10, 2013; NA: February 25, 2014; AU: February 27, 2014; EU: February 28, 2014 Windows; WW: February 2, 2016 Switch, PS4, Xbox One; WW: February 17, 2023
- Genre: Action role-playing game
- Modes: Single-player, multiplayer

Tales of Symphonia (Note: Japanese: テイルズ オブ シンフォニア, Hepburn: Teiruzu Obu Shinfonia) is an action role-playing video game developed by Namco Tales Studio and published by Namco for the GameCube. The fifth main installment of the Tales series, it was released in Japan on August 29, 2003, in North America on July 13, 2004, and in Europe on November 19, 2004. In Japan, the game was ported for the PlayStation 2 with additional content and was released on September 22, 2004.

The game takes place in a fictional world called Sylvarant and follows Lloyd Irving. Lloyd accompanies his childhood friend, Colette Brunel, who is destined to go on a journey to save their world. As their journey progresses, they learn that saving Sylvarant endangers Tethe'alla, a world parallel to their own. The game's central theme is an "RPG that resonates with you" (君と響きあうRPG, Kimi to Hibikiau RPG).

Tales of Symphonia received generally positive reviews upon release. Critics praised the battle system, art direction, voice acting and character development, but had mixed reactions to the music and narrative, and criticized some graphical shortcomings. The game received a Japan Game Awards in 2003 and had received re-releases under the Player's Choice and PlayStation 2 the Best labels. In the United States, over 100 thousand copies were sold during the first two weeks and has sold 2.4 million copies worldwide across all platforms, making it the best-selling title in the franchise at the time. The game has been adapted into seven manga collections, two novel series, seven drama CDs, and an OVA anime series. A sequel entitled Tales of Symphonia: Dawn of the New World was released for the Wii in 2008. Tales of Symphonia and its sequel were collected as a PlayStation 3 high definition release in Tales of Symphonia Chronicles in 2013. A Steam version was released on February 2, 2016. A remastered version was released for Nintendo Switch, PlayStation 4 and Xbox One on February 17, 2023.

== Gameplay ==
An example of combat in Tales of Symphonia

Like previous installments in the Tales series, Tales of Symphonia consists primarily of three major areas: an overworld field map, town and dungeon maps, and a battle screen. The overworld map is a 3D model, featuring a scaled-down version of the game's fictional world which the player travels through to reach the game's locations. As with preceding games in the series, the world map can be traversed by foot, on the party's quadrupedal pet Noishe, and flying vehicles known as Rheairds. On field maps, characters are directed across realistically scaled environments. The battle screen is a 3D representation of an area, in which the player commands the characters in battles against CPU-controlled enemies.

On the overworld and field maps, various skits between the characters can be viewed. They involve animated character portraits, subtitles, and, in the Japanese version, full voice acting. Skits concern anything from character development to side details. Overworld map skits affect Lloyd's relationships with other party members. The player will be able to make certain decisions that imperceptibly affect how the other characters think of Lloyd. Some of these choices have minor ramifications for the game's storyline.

Battle system

During battle sequences, the game uses the Multi-Line Linear Motion Battle System. Four characters from the party are chosen to battle; those not controlled by a player are guided by artificial intelligence with instructions set by the player beforehand. Damage dealt to the opponent fills a "Unison Gauge". When this is full, a "Unison Attack" can be triggered, allowing the party to use techniques simultaneously on a single enemy. When certain techniques are combined, a special attack results in additional damage.

After the battle, a currency called Grade is awarded or subtracted based on specific criteria that are fulfilled in battle. It is used to purchase bonuses during New Game Plus. Players are also prompted to cook food after battles if they have the materials. Cooking recipes determine the benefits received such as health recovery. The degree of the benefit is determined by which character is chosen to cook.

Tales of Symphonia's skill system is built around the use of "EX Gems", which come in four ranks. Each character can equip up to four EX Gems and set abilities to those gems. The abilities determine if the characters will learn Strike or Technical techniques and spells. Combinations of EX Gem abilities can also grant additional abilities called "EX-Skills". The development of a character's attributes is determined by their equipped "Title". Titles are earned through story progression, side quests, or completion of miscellaneous criteria.

== Plot ==
=== Setting ===
Tales of Symphonia is set in the parallel worlds Sylverant and Tethe'alla, which are separated by a dimensional barrier that can only be passed through using magical technology (or "magitech"). Sylverant is in a state of decline due to the depletion of mana, a force essential to life and the use of magic. The two worlds share a single source of mana and are caught in a precarious equilibrium in which mana is unevenly distributed; as one world prospers, the other declines. Ancient elemental guardians known as Summon Spirits regulate the flow of mana in each world. The mana distribution system is overseen by Cruxis, a religious body surrounding the goddess Martel. Cruxis orchestrates the selection of a "Chosen" (a supposed descendant of Martel's angels) from a human with an exceptional affinity for mana, who must then undertake a pilgrimage that ostensibly restores balance to the world. The Chosen must awaken the Summon Spirits of their world and ascend the Tower of Salvation, where Martel will be awakened and the Chosen will be reborn as an angel. This process is believed to regenerate the world's mana, but does so at the expense of the other world.

Sylvarant and Tethe'alla are inhabited by humans as well as elves, a race of long-lived humanoid extraterrestrials who originated from the giant comet Derris-Kharlan and can manipulate mana to cast magic. Although normally only those of elven blood can cast magic, humans can gain the same ability by ingesting the powdered ore Aionis. Offspring born between humans and elves are half-elves, who bear both the fighting spirit and curiosity of humans and the longevity and magical capabilities of elves. Because of this, they are discriminated against by condescending elves and jealous humans, and in Tethe'alla they are deprived of civil rights.

4000 years prior, a war was waged by the Desians, a faction of half-elves seeking supremacy, who were sealed away by the legendary hero Mithos via a pact with Martel. Due to Sylvarant's weakening mana, the Desians have reemerged and are terrorizing humanity, conducting biological experiments on abducted humans in facilities known as human ranches, which further consumes mana. During this time, humanity puts its hopes upon the Chosen to awaken Martel, who will reseal the Desians. The Chosen's pilgrimage is complicated by the presence of the Renegades, a group that deliberately dresses in Desian garb and has assassinated Sylvarant's Chosen for the past 800 years, preventing Martel's awakening.

Several characters bear an Exsphere, a small jewel that enhances the wearer's natural abilities when implanted onto the skin, and is also used as a power source for machinery. However, an Exsphere's amplifying capability can only be awakened at the cost of a human life, and the Exsphere parasitically feeds off the user's mana unless a suppressant named a Key Crest is installed. An evolved form of Exsphere known as a Cruxis Crystal grants its user immortality, a pair of angel-like wings, and a relinquished need for human functions such as eating or sleeping, but eventually erases the user's ego if worn without a Key Crest. The Chosen is said to be born holding a Cruxis Crystal, though it is actually granted by Cruxis, which acts to perpetuate the Chosen's genetic lineage in the prospering world and to guide the Chosen's pilgrimage via an oracle in the declining world.

=== Characters ===
The main protagonist is Lloyd Irving, a young swordsman who joins the Chosen's pilgrimage as a means of protecting his childhood friend Colette Brunel. He also seeks to defeat the Desians and avenge his mother, who was said to be killed protecting the Exsphere on the back of Lloyd's hand. The other members of the pilgrimage include Lloyd and Colette's mutual friend Genis Sage, their village schoolteacher and Genis's older sister Raine Sage, and the traveling mercenary Kratos Aurion, who is hired by the village church to escort Colette. Genis and Raine, both proficient magic users, initially pass themselves off as elves before being exposed as half-elves in Tethe'alla. The group is later joined by Sheena Fujibayashi, a ninja from Tethe'alla who initially tries to assassinate Colette; Zelos Wilder, the arrogant and womanizing Chosen of Tethe'alla; Presea Combatir, a young lumberjack with superhuman strength as a result of Cruxis Crystal-related experiments; and Regal Bryant, an ex-convict who wishes to avenge his lover, whom he was forced to kill.

Cruxis is led by Yggdrasill, a half-elf whose ultimate goal is to turn all people into lifeless beings in order to bring about an age free of discrimination. Yggdrasill's secret identity is that of the legendary hero Mithos, an ageless half-elven boy who seeks to revive his older sister Martel, whom he propped up as a goddess following her death in the ancient war. Prior to Yggdrasill's appearance, the oracle Remiel, who promotes Colette's transformation into an angel, serves as the primary representative of Cruxis. The Renegades, a group attempting to thwart Cruxis' goals, are led by Yuan, a half-elf who aided Mithos in ending the ancient war and was engaged to Martel.

=== Story ===
Colette is summoned to her village's church to receive the oracle who will initiate her pilgrimage to regenerate Sylvarant. She is protected from an apparent Desian attack by her friends Lloyd and Genis, as well as the traveling mercenary Kratos. Lloyd and Genis are initially denied the opportunity to accompany Colette on her pilgrimage, and Colette, hoping to protect them, secretly leaves early with Raine and Kratos. However, Lloyd and Genis's violation of a treaty with a nearby human ranch leads to their village's devastation and their exile, leaving them no other option but to join Colette's pilgrimage. During the journey, the process of the Chosen's transformation into an angel is revealed to entail the gradual loss of Colette's humanity. They also encounter and eventually make peace with the assassin Sheena, who comes from the parallel world of Tethe'alla. From her, they learn how the two worlds vie for each other's mana through the journey of regeneration. Within a human ranch, the group discovers that Exspheres are cultivated within humans, with Lloyd's Exsphere having came from within his mother. Hoping to find answers from the oracle Remiel, the party meets him at the Chosen's final destination and are betrayed by Remiel and Kratos; both are revealed to be members of Cruxis, which seeks to use the Chosen's body as Martel's vessel.

The party is rescued by the Renegades, a group that poses as Desians and aims to prevent Martel's resurrection. The Renegades' leader, Yuan, explains that the Desians are servants of Cruxis and act to terrorize the population of the declining world and stimulate the growth of the Chosen's Cruxis Crystal. When Yuan declares his intent to secure Lloyd to further the Renegades' purpose, the party escapes for Tethe'alla, where they meet the Chosen Zelos and restore Colette's humanity after crafting a Key Crest for her Cruxis Crystal. In search for a way to save both worlds, the party determines that awakening the Summon Spirits in both worlds will sever the mana tie between them. Believing that to be the answer, they forge pacts with Tethe'alla's Summon Spirits to sever all mana ties between the two worlds. During this time, the party meets and befriends a half-elven youth named Mithos, who shares the name of the legendary hero. The groups actions instead destabilize the Great Seed, the supplier of mana to both worlds, causing it to grow catastrophically and engulf Sylvarant. The party re-stabilizes the seed using a Renegade-designed mana cannon. Colette suffers an illness that is caused by her Cruxis Crystal and was once cured by the hero Mithos, requiring the party to seek materials for a cure. In their search, they learn from an elven storyteller that the hero Mithos eventually became the Cruxis leader Yggdrasill, who split the world in two with the reality-bending Eternal Sword.

After curing Colette, Lloyd is held hostage by Yuan, who reveals Kratos to be Lloyd's father and demands that Kratos unseal the Summon Spirit Origin from himself. The Renegades, seeking to germinate the Great Seed, require a pact from Origin to wield the Eternal Sword. However, unsealing Origin would result in Kratos's death. The boy Mithos also reveals himself to be Yggdrasill, attacking Yuan and rejecting his former companions. The party realizes they can save the world if they defeat Mithos, unseal Origin and wield the Eternal Sword to merge the worlds and germinate the Great Seed. At Mithos' stronghold, Zelos allows Colette to be kidnapped in a genuine or feigned betrayal of the party (depending on the player's choices), and Mithos uses Colette's body to reawaken Martel. However, Martel rejects Mithos' actions and twisted vision, and before vanishing back into the Great Seed, she laments that the elves should never have left Derris-Kharlan. Mithos misinterprets this sentiment as a wish to leave the two worlds for Derris-Kharlan, but is seemingly killed by the party before carrying out his seizure of the Great Seed, and Genis keeps his Cruxis Crystal as a memento of his sole half-elven friend.

Kratos reveals that he has been gathering materials to forge a ring that will allow Lloyd to use the Eternal Sword. Seeking atonement, he urges Lloyd to duel him and release Origin. In a symbolic struggle, Lloyd defeats Kratos and the seal is broken, but Yuan saves Kratos's life with a mana transfusion. After Lloyd forges a pact with Origin, Mithos' spirit, having survived within his Cruxis Crystal, emerges and possesses a member from the party before fleeing to Derris-Kharlan. Mithos attempts to take the Great Seed with him, but is foiled and killed by Lloyd. Using the Eternal Sword, Lloyd merges Sylvarant and Tethe'alla together and germinates the Great Seed, which sprouts into a seedling that will become the Giant Kharlan Tree. The Great Seed's spiritual incarnation, Mana, guides Lloyd toward protecting the Tree, and Lloyd proves his pact by christening the Tree with an unrevealed name.

== Development and release ==
On May 8, 2002, Namco and Nintendo announced at a Tokyo press conference that they would collaborate on a number of titles for the GameCube, including a new installment in the Tales series slated for a July 2003 release. Originally developed under the title Tales of Phantasia, its final title was revealed to be Tales of Symphonia in February 2003. An April 2003 edition of Famitsu revealed the game had been in development for two years, most of the development staff previously worked on Tales of Eternia, the game would have the most main characters in a Tales game to date, and would be the first 3D game in the series. A North American localization was confirmed at E3 2003. A conference by Namco on June 9, 2003, revealed the game would be on two disks and its theme song would be "Starry Heavens" by J-pop group Day After Tomorrow, which is also remixed as "Starry Heavens ver. 2013", which is performed by the band's lead singer, Misono, in the PS3 version, as well as the PC and Remastered versions. To celebrate its release in Japan, the game was bundled with a symphonic green GameCube. To increase the North American version's appeal to Western audiences, localization producer Nao Higo replaced "Starry Heavens" with an orchestral anthem by composer Motoi Sakuraba, and focused on hiring experienced voice actors such as Scott Menville, Tara Strong, and Cam Clarke for the English voice-acting. The game was released in Japan on August 29, 2003, and was localized in North America, Australia, and Europe on July 13, 2004, November 18, 2004, and November 19, 2004, respectively. The game was re-released in North America under the Player's Choice label on July 19, 2004.

During the second week of April 2004, Weekly Shōnen Jump announced a PlayStation 2 port of Tales of Symphonia. It received new in-game additions and its theme song is "Soshite Boku ni Dekiru Koto" (そして僕にできるコト, lit. "And Thus, I Can Do It") by Day After Tomorrow, which is also remixed as "Soshite Boku ni Dekiru Koto ver. 2013" (そして僕にできるコト ver.2013, lit. "And Thus, I Can Do It ver. 2013"), which is also performed by the band's lead singer, Misono, in the PS3 version, as well as the PC and Remastered versions. It was released exclusively in Japan on September 22, 2004, and re-released under the PlayStation 2 the Best label on July 7, 2005.

=== Scenario ===
Takumi Miyajima, the game's writer, explained Tales of Symphonia was planned to create a "unique symphonia", dependent on the player's choices and the affection system. Miyajima wrote many scenarios, with the most significant events centered on Zelos Wilder. Originally, Zelos' death was supposed to be canon. His survival would have been dependent on the affection system: He would die early on if he was ranked the lowest in the affection system, would die at the end if he ranked in the middle, and would only survive if he ranked the top. However, the development staff suggested to have Kratos Aurion return to the party and the team discussed how it would work. The change in scenario had Miyajima rework Zelos' death into a non-canon path of the story. While generally a self-contained story, Symphonia apparently takes place within either the same or a similar timeline to the first Tales game, Tales of Phantasia.

=== Sequel and Chronicles release ===
A direct sequel, Tales of Symphonia: Dawn of the New World, (Note: Tales of Symphonia: Knight of Ratatosk (テイルズ オブ シンフォニア ラタトスクの騎士, Teiruzu Obu Shinfonia Ratatosuku no Kishi)) was announced on July 20, 2007, for the Wii. It was released in Japan and North America in 2008 and in Europe a year after.

Tales of Symphonia Chronicles was announced on June 1, 2013, for the PlayStation 3. It contains Tales of Symphonia and Tales of Symphonia: Dawn of the New World with remastered graphics and additional content. It was released in Japan on October 10, 2013, and it was released in North America, Australia, and Europe in February 2014 as both a retail version and download release, with the option to purchase Tales of Symphonia as a standalone release.

== Adaptations ==
- Tales of Symphonia
- Original video animation

Tales of Symphonia The Animation: Sylvarant Episode
- Directed by: Haruo Sotozaki
- Produced by: Hiroyuki Ōmori; Makoto Nakamura
- Written by: Ryunosuke Kingetsu
- Music by: Zizz Studio
- Studio: Ufotable
- Licensed by: NA: Discotek Media
- Released: June 8, 2007 – December 21, 2007
- Runtime: 32–34 minutes (each)
- Episodes: 4
- Original video animation

Tales of Symphonia The Animation: Tethe'alla Episode
- Directed by: Haruo Sotozaki
- Produced by: Hiroyuki Ōmori; Takayuki Matsunaga
- Written by: Ryunosuke Kingetsu
- Music by: Zizz Studio
- Studio: Ufotable
- Licensed by: NA: Discotek Media
- Released: March 25, 2010 – February 25, 2011
- Runtime: 40–46 minutes (each)
- Episodes: 4
- Original video animation

Tales of Symphonia The Animation: The United World Episode
- Directed by: Haruo Sotozaki
- Produced by: Takayuki Matsunaga; Keitarō Sunohara
- Written by: Ryunosuke Kingetsu
- Music by: Zizz Studio
- Studio: Ufotable
- Licensed by: NA: Discotek Media
- Released: November 23, 2011 – October 23, 2012
- Runtime: 33–47 minutes (each)
- Episodes: 3

=== Comics ===
Tales of Symphonia spawned seven manga adaptations after its release: six anthology collections and a traditional manga series.

The first anthology collection, Tales of Symphonia Comic Anthology (Note: テイルズ オブ シンフォニア コミックアンソロジー, Teiruzu Obu Shinfonia Komikku Ansorojī), consists of five volumes which were released between November 25, 2003, and February 25, 2006, by Ichijinsha. The second anthology collection, Tales of Symphonia Yonkoma Kings (Note: テイルズ オブ シンフォニア コミックア 4コマ Kings, Teiruzu Obu Shinfonia Yonkoma Kings), is a four-panel comic. It consists of five volumes released between November 25, 2003, and December 25, 2006, by Ichijinsha. A third anthology collection entitled BC Anthology Collection Tales of Symphonia (Note: BCアンソロジーコレクション テイルズ オブ シンフォニア, BC Ansorojī Korekushon Teiruzu Obu Shinfonia) had two volumes published by Mag Garden in February 2005 and 2007. The fourth anthology collection is BC Anthology Collection Tales of Symphonia Yonkoma Short Comic Collection (Note: BCアンソロジーコレクション テイルズ オブ シンフォニア ４コマ・ショートコミックセレクション, BC Ansorojī Korekushon Teiruzu Obu Shinfonia Yonkoma: Shōto Komikku Serekushon) and consisted of a single volume which was released by Mag Garden on October 10, 2007. The fifth anthology collection is Super Comic Theater: Tales of Symphonia (Note: スーパーコミック劇場 テイルズ オブ シンフォニア, Sūpā Komikku Gekijou Teiruzu Obu Shinfonia). It consisted of two volumes which were released by Square Enix on May 27, 2005, and September 16, 2005. The sixth anthology collection is Tales of Symphonia Comic Anthology: The Best (Note: テイルズ オブ シンフォニア コミックアンソロジー The Best, Teiruzu Obu Shinfonia Komikku Ansorojī The Best) is a single volume released on June 5, 2010, by Ichijinsha.

The manga series by Hitoshi Ichimura was titled Tales of Symphonia and was an adaptation of the game's storyline. The first four chapters were serialized between the April and July 2005 editions of Monthly Comic Blade. Future chapters were released in tankōbon volumes by Mag Garden thereafter. Six volumes were released: the first was released on August 10, 2005, and the last two were released on July 10, 2007.

=== Books ===
Tales of Symphonia has spun off two novel series adaptions, four strategy guides, a character book, an official scenario book, and an art book. The first novel series is titled Tales of Symphonia and is written by Kiyoshi Yuki. It consisted of three novels released between November 21 and December 20, 2003, by Shueisha. The second novel series is titled Tales of Symphonia: Radiance of Time (テイルズ オブ シンフォニア 久遠 の輝き, Teiruzu Obu Shinfonia Toki no Kagayaki) and is written by Sera Yajima. It consists of four volumes released between December 20, 2003, and June 19, 2004, by Enterbrain. An after story by the same author was released on September 18, 2004.

Two strategy guides under the V Jump Books brand were published by Shueisha: the GameCube guide was released on August 29, 2003, and the PS2 on September 22, 2004. Namco Bandai Games released two official strategy guides on October 1, 2003, and October 27, 2004, for the GameCube and PS2 respectively. Tales of Symphonia Illustration: Kosuke Fujishima's Character Work (Note: テイルズ オブ シンフォニア イラストレーションズ 藤島康介のキャラクター仕事, Teiruzu Obu Shinfonia Irasutorēshonzu Fujishima Kōsuke no Kyarakutā Shigoto) is a book by the game's designer, Kōsuke Fujishima, and was released on January 26, 2004, by Ichijinsha. It provides details on the characters' back story and how their design came to be. Tales of Symphonia Official Scenario Book (Note: テイルズ オブ シンフォニア 公式シナリオブック, Teiruzu Obu Shinfonia Koushiki Shinario Bukku) was released on June 26, 2008, by Namco Bandai. The book details the history of the world and characters. Tales of Symphonia The Animation Visual Complete Picture Book (Note: テイルズ オブ シンフォニア The Animation ビジュアルコンプリートブック, Teiruzu Obu Shinfonia The Animation Bijua Rukon Purīto Bukku) is an art book for the anime released on March 28, 2013, by ASCII Media Works.

=== Audio CDs ===
Seven drama CDs based on the game's plot were produced by Frontier Works. Drama CD: Tales of Symphonia (A Long Time Ago) (Note: ドラマCD テイルズ オブ シンフォニア 〜A long time ago〜, Dorama CD Teiruzu Obu Shinfonia 〜A long time ago〜) 1, 2, and 3 are stories preceding the game. They were released between July 23, 2004, and September 24, 2004. Drama CD: Tales of Symphonia Anthology 1 (Rodeo Ride Tour) (Note: ドラマCD テイルズ オブ シンフォニア アンソロジー1 〜ロデオライド・ツアー〜, Dorama CD Teiruzu Obu Shinfonia Ansorojī 1 (Rodeoraido Tsuā)) First Part and Second Part follow Sheena Fujibayashi and Zelos Wilder as they tour the world a year after the events of the main game. The two CDs were released on May 25, 2005, and June 24, 2005. Tales of Symphonia Comic Market 78 (Note: テイルズリング・シンフォニア Comic Market 78) and Tales of Symphonia Comic Market 79 (Note: テイルズリング・シンフォニア Comic Market 79) are side stories with guest characters from Tales of Vesperia and Tales of Graces, respectively.

Tales of Symphonia Original Soundtrack (Note: テイルズ オブ シンフォニア オリジナル・サウンドトラック, Teiruzu Obu Shinfonia Orijinaru Saundotorakku) was published by DigiCube on October 1, 2003, and consists of 4 discs. It debuted at 98 on Oricon's charts. The soundtrack was re-released on October 27, 2004, by King Records (Japan) for the PS2 port of Tales of Symphonia.

=== Animation ===
Tales of Symphonia The Animation (テイルズ オブ シンフォニア The Animation, Teiruzu Obu Shinfonia The Animation) was an OVA series animated by Ufotable and produced by Geneon Universal Entertainment and Frontier Works. It consists of four episodes which were released direct-to-video on four separate DVDs on June 8, August 10, October 24, and December 21, 2007. They were later released in a Blu-ray Disc collection on September 26, 2008. The series later rereleased on Universal Media Disc between June 25 and July 23, 2010. On May 8, 2010, the series were aired on AT-X as a promotion to the sequel of the series. The episodes used three pieces of theme music: The opening theme is "Almateria" by Eri Kawai and the two ending themes were "Negai" (願い, lit."Wish") by Kaori Hikita and Uchi e Kaerou (うちへ帰ろう, lit. "Let's Go Home") by Nana Mizuki.

The sequel series, Tales of Symphonia the Animation: Tethe'alla Episode (テイルズ オブ シンフォニア The Animation テセアラ編, Teiruzu Obu Shinfonia The Animation: Teseara hen), was announced during Tales of Festival 2008. It consists of four episodes which were released on March 25, May 26, September 23, 2010, and February 25, 2011. All four episodes received an early screening: The first was screened on March 13, 2010, in Fukuoka and was hosted by Music Plaza Indo; The second on May 4, 2010, in Tokushima, Tokushima by Ufotable; the third on September 17, 2010, in Yokohama by Animate; and the fourth on February 20, 2011, in Roppongi by Toho. The first two episodes were later aired on September 12, 2010, on AT-X. The episodes used the opening theme "Tenkuu no Canaria" (天空のカナリア, lit."Canary in the Sky") by Nana Mizuki and the ending theme "Inori no Kanata" (祈りの彼方, lit."Beyond the Prayers") by Akiko Shikata. Ending theme of the 4th episode is "Tethe’alla: Tsui no Kodomo-tachi" (対の子どもたち) by Akiko Shikata.

The second sequel, Tales of Symphonia the Animation: The United World Episode (テイルズ オブ シンフォニア The Animation 世界統合編, Teiruzu Obu Shinfonia The Animation: Sekai Tōgō-hen), concludes the anime's plot. It consists of three episodes released directly to DVD and Blu-ray on November 23, 2011, June 20, 2012, and October 24, 2012. All three episodes had early screenings: the first was screened between September 23 and September 25, 2011, by Cinema Sunshine in Ikebukuro; the second on May 3, 2012, in Tokushima by Ufotable; and the third is on September 29, 2012, by Cinema Sunshine in Ikebukuro. The episodes use four pieces of theme musics: an opening theme "Ho-n-to-u-so" (ホ・ン・ト・ウ・ソ, lit. "Truth and Lies") by Misono and three ending themes, "Ta ga Tame no Sekai" (誰ガ為ノ世界, lit. "A World for Someone Else"), "Ibitsu" (歪, lit. "Distortion"), and "Hikari furu basho de ~Promesse~" (光降る場所で～Promesse～, lit. "At the Place Where the Light Falls ~Promise~"), all by Akiko Shikata.

A Blu-ray box set containing all three series was announced on June 1, 2013, and released on November 6, 2013.

== Reception ==
Reception

Aggregate score
Aggregator	Score
Metacritic	86/100

Review scores
Publication	Score
1Up.com	7/10
Electronic Gaming Monthly	24.5/30
Eurogamer	9/10
G4	4/5
Game Informer	8.75/10
GamePro	4.5/5
GameRevolution	B
GameSpot	8.8/10
GameSpy	4/5
GameZone	8.5/10
IGN	8.5/10
Nintendo Power	24/25
Nintendo World Report	9/10
PALGN	9/10

Award
Publication	Award
Japan Game Awards	Award for Excellence

Tales of Symphonia garnered "generally favorable" reception from critics according to review aggregator Metacritic. Alan Averill and Steve Thomason of Nintendo Power determined the game to be the GameCube's best RPG, as well as one of the best Averill had played. Jeremy Jastrzab of PALGN regarded it as a "top gameplay experience", praising the depth of its gameplay and story. Jonathan Metts of Planet GameCube said that although the game "clings to many of the well-worn RPG elements", its distinct battle system, story, and visual presentation allowed it to stand on equal footing with the most recent Final Fantasy titles. Rob Fahey of Eurogamer argued that the game was "the finest example ever made of the truly traditional Japanese RPG", but was concerned that this traditional nature might dissuade players from trying it. Benjamin Turner of GameSpy said that the lush artwork and innovative battle system characteristic of Tales games helped Symphonia stand out in the GameCube's "RPG-starved" library.

The battle system was praised for its ease of use and fast pace, with Jastrzab declaring it to be one of the best systems conceived for an action RPG. David Smith of 1UP.com noted the battle system's tactical depth due to limited 3D movement, preventing exploitative tactics seen in games like Star Ocean: Till the End of Time; Fahey also drew a comparison to the title, considering the computer-controlled characters in Tales to be significantly more intelligent. Metts called it "a perfect balance between the strategy of traditional menu-based RPG battles and the fast, skill-based action found in a weapons-based fighting game like Soul Calibur". While Star Dingo of GamePro concurred that the game's individual character control was "excellent", he lamented that the computer-controlled nature of the other party members diluted the joy of discovering new skills, and said that attempts to micromanage the other members made the battle system clunky and burdensome. Joe Juba of Game Informer, meanwhile, was impressed by the variable customization of the computer-controlled characters' behavior. Daryl Vassar of G4techTV cited the battles as the game's high point and claimed they were fun enough to win over non-RPG fans, though he considered the summoning system — which requires a character to take a great deal of damage before performing such an action — to be a weakness.

Beyond the battle system, the game's design was praised for its depth. Brian Gee of GameRevolution and Mary Jane Irwin of IGN noted that the free-roaming gameplay made it easy for the player to wander into a dungeon with excessively strong enemies. Irwin negatively compared the amount of backtracking in the game's vast overworld to The Legend of Zelda: The Wind Waker, but was thankful for the various modes of transportation that were continuously introduced. The dungeon puzzles were described as simple and easy to decipher. Irwin, comparing the puzzles to The Legend of Zelda, welcomed them as breaks from the frequent exploration and battles, as well as an expansion of the game's appeal to a broader audience. While Smith agreed that the quality of the puzzles was not exceptional, he considered them a decent challenge and an improvement over those in Tales of Destiny. Metts dismissed the puzzles as "more annoying than challenging and often feel out of place". Irwin and Electronic Gaming Monthly's Shane Bettenhausen criticized the difficulty spikes, with particularly tough boss battles requiring grinding, and Jennifer Tsao of Electronic Gaming Monthly noted the save system's harshness. Jastrzab also acknowledged the boss battles as "fearsome and challenging", but regarded them more admirably. Smith and Irwin were annoyed by the fetch quests, citing examples of unnecessarily convoluted tasks.

The visuals were commended for their cel-shading effects and anime-influenced art direction, with Jastrzab saying that the stylish characters, animations and special effects enhanced the game's battle sequences. Juba proclaimed the game's world to be "one of the most stunning [he has] ever experienced", likening the presentation to "Windwaker [sic]-meets-anime". Smith, however, found the character designs lackluster compared to earlier Tales games, citing Fujishima's simplified designs. He also criticized the cel-shading style as uneven and shaky compared to that of Jet Set Radio. The settings were admired for their detail and variety, with some commenting that the background art transitioned well into a 3D format from the classic Tales titles. Jastrzab was stunned by the lack of slowdown during the game's chaotic action segments, Turner was also amazed by the consistently high framerate, which he regarded as "a great bonus in a time when most RPGs are content to chug at 30 [fps]". Fahey and Jastrzab were disappointed by the game's lack of cutscenes in the vein of the traditionally-animated opening cinematic. The in-game cutscenes were described by the EGM reviewers and Jastrzab as "dull" and "a little underdone". Fahey and GameSpot's Bethany Massimilla noted visual smearing in the game's attempt at depth of field effects. The overworld's presentation was criticized as underwhelming; some compared its level of detail to titles from the previous generation of consoles, while Jastrzab argued that the quality would not have been passable even in that context. Massimilla additionally faulted the camera in these portions, explaining that it required frequent adjustment and sometimes obscured incoming enemies.

Reactions to the music were mixed; some found the score forgettable compared to Sakuraba's usual work, which was a source of disappointment for Fahey, as he felt the "beautifully constructed" world deserved a more impressive soundtrack. Turner and Irwin described the music as decent, though Irwin remarked that the musical variety was relegated to dialogue-oriented events, with the battle and overworld themes taking up most of the playtime. Jastrzab called the soundtrack exceptional for capturing the game's mood. Massimilla observed that the soundtrack "[held] true to the Tales' norm of combining wind instruments and bells in pleasing ways for main themes".

The voice acting was commended, with Smith remarking that the characters were "more fun to hear than they are to look at". He added that the repartee between Lloyd and Genis elevated them above their archetypes. Fahey noted that his praise of the voice acting was rare as he was not a fan of dubbing, and was slightly disappointed that the skits were not voiced as well, which he said resulted in them feeling drawn-out. Although Jastrzab approved of the voice acting's professional quality, he mentioned that some of the dialogue was not well-placed, explaining that "There is no building of feeling or creation of tension, it pretty much bursts onto the scene". Irwin noted awkward deliveries and misplaced emotions. Turner also deemed the voices to be "so-so", opining that while the characters' battle vocalizations were sufficient, the actors lacked the range needed for the more emotionally demanding cutscenes, which he said were held back by "generally inept" direction.

Responses to the narrative were mixed, with some considering the story to be familiar and predictable. The Nintendo Power reviewers said that the story was told with "wonderful craft", and were surprised that the player-controlled character does not carry the "chosen one" role. Jastrzab argued that the story held a "never-ending" depth underneath its surface, which he said was highlighted by the variety of plot outcomes that arose from subtle decisions by the player, though he warned of the script's excessive moralizing. Metts agreed that the plot was standard, though he remarked that the set-up was "unusually blunt, in that you are told the implications of the quest right upfront". However, he proposed that the narrative could assuage GameCube owners desiring a traditional RPG, and described the ending sequence as "beautiful and powerful". Star Dingo compared the story's combination of "heart, warmth, humor, sadness and peril" to the works of Rumiko Takahashi, and proclaimed the writing to be some of the best among console RPGs, elaborating that "the tragedies really strike home, and the characters all have distinct voices, speaking their lines with a welcome sense of subtle irony and self-awareness about RPG clichés". While Fahey acknowledged that the premise was simple and cliché, he said that the plot twists were well-employed. Irwin was unengaged to the story, which she attributed to what she deemed a flawed localization; she explained that "The dialogue is often awkward and drawn out. Word choice ranges from overly formal to random slang – the style is all over the linguistic map with little regard to who's speaking". The Nintendo Power reviewers and Metts were satisfied with the story's pace, while Turner remarked that the narrative meandered at times.

The characters were said to be likable and well-developed. Metts compared the cast to that of The Lord of the Rings in that they "initially seem simple and stereotypical but almost feel like real people by the end of the story". Fahey singled out Lloyd's development and was thankful that the writers were "of the persuasion which says that dark revelations of the past are not a substitute for creating a proper personality for your characters". Although Juba regarded the character archetypes as cookie-cutter (apart from Raine, who he described as "seem[ing] to derive sexual pleasure from uncovering archeological artifacts"), he along with Bettenhausen and Massimilla acknowledged that the optional skits substantially contributed to the characters' depth; Juba additionally compared the skits to the Active Time Event system in Final Fantasy IX. However, Bettenhausen and Massimilla faulted the skits for their slow pace.

=== Remastered ===
Reception

Aggregate scores
Aggregator	Score
Metacritic	PS4: 69/100; NS: 63/100
OpenCritic	27% recommend (Note: Based on 50 reviews.)

Review scores
Publication	Score
GameSpot	5/10
Gamezebo	2.5/5
Hardcore Gamer	4/5
Nintendo Life	6/10
Push Square	7/10
RPGamer	3/5
RPGFan	60/100

Tales of Symphonia Remastered received "mixed or average" reviews according to Metacritic. The remaster was faulted for its downgraded and inconsistent framerate, as well as frequent and long load times. Some considered it to be the game's worst version, with Noah Leiter of RPGFan describing it as an "antithetical runt" to Metroid Prime Remastered and the Game Boy emulations for Nintendo Switch Online. Paul Shkreli of RPGamer added that selling the remaster at a premium price without the addition of its sequel Dawn of the New World felt "both confounding and anti-consumer", noting that the 2016 Steam release featured everything the remaster offered at half the price. Mitch Vogel of Nintendo Life agreed that the exclusion of Dawn of the New World resulted in an unclear value proposition. Glen Fox of Gamezebo, upon establishing that Tales of Symphonia is his personal favorite video game, denounced the remaster as "a complete and utter mess", and expressed bafflement as to why Bandai Namco would allow "one of its most treasured releases from yesteryear" to be released in such a state.

Kirstin Swalley of Hardcore Gamer considered the combat simplistic but enjoyable due to the small depths granted by its mechanics, though she warned that it may initially feel clunky to players more accustomed to modern Tales titles. Robert Ramsey of Push Square observed that, by modern standards, the combat was relatively basic and the controls were slightly stiff, but neverless deemed the fights satisfying because of their pace. Leiter described the combat as smooth, challenging, and rewarding to careful players, but he found the controls to be awkward and delayed. While Shkreli found the combat to be enjoyable without being overwhelming, he experienced difficulty with enemies approaching from multiple angles due to the 2D plane. Vogel cited the same difficulty, remarking that the battles felt stiff compared to similar hack 'n' slash combat featured in Ys VIII: Lacrimosa of Dana and Kingdom Hearts II. He added that the inability to cancel out of attack animations, which would incentivize careful timing and skill usage, was complicated by a fast battle pace that encourages reactive and reckless tactics. Jake Dekker of GameSpot described the combat as stiff and slow compared to Tales of Berseria and Tales of Arise, but noted that unlocking more skills eventually made for a more intricate and satisfying experience. He singled out the boss battles as an engaging highlight due to their relatively increased challenge.

Swalley and Shkreli commended the variety of puzzles and enemies in the dungeons, with Shkreli calling them elaborate without being inordinate. Ramsey, however, found some of the dungeon designs tedious. Vogel considered the dungeons a highlight in the title's conventional gameplay loop, positively comparing their use of puzzles to Golden Sun. Swalley noted that the multiple playthroughs required to obtain everything in the game encouraged significant replay value. Ramsey was annoyed by the overworld map camera. Swalley and Dekker complained of frequent game crashes, which were exacerbated by the lack of an autosave feature.

Swalley complimented the key locations as solid and said that the increased crispness and clarity of the character models enhanced their detail and expressiveness, though she felt that some textures "could have used more work". Vogel and Ramsey said that the visual improvements were negligible apart from the upgraded resolution. Both described the textures as muddy, and while they noted that the art direction was still distinct, Vogel felt that the environment designs lacked a unique visual flair. Leiter also found many textures to be stretched or glossy. Shkreli regarded the art style as timeless and vibrant despite the scaled-down cel-shading effects, but dismissed the overworld as drab and poorly modeled. Fox declared the remaster to be the game's ugliest version, citing an unpleasant sharpening effect caused by AI upscaling, missing cel-shading effects, desaturated colors, and missing visual features such as transparent menus and the "screen-shattering" battle transition effect. Dekker faulted the cutscenes as stiff and awkward and the overworld as bland and lifeless.

Swalley maintained that the soundtrack was "fantastic as it ever was", and marveled at the option to choose between the English and Japanese audio tracks. Ramsey described the soundtrack as "very catchy", and Leiter regarded Sakuraba's score as highly memorable, singling out the battle themes as highlights. However, he cited compressed voice lines as a fault. Shkreli "strongly felt" Sakuraba's presence in the battle anthems and village themes.

Ramsey said that while the story was somewhat predictable, the characters were endearing and had great chemistry given by "sharp and often comedic" writing. Leiter called the story a "banger" and enjoyed the novelty of the protagonist playing a supporting role to the "chosen one" character. However, he felt that the story's heavy themes of genocide and slavery were sometimes at odds with the light-hearted and humorous tone and mildly cutesy visuals, and considered the presentation of such themes uncarefully handled, referring to the human ranches as "Philosopher's Stone factory/concentration camps". Dekker echoed this sentiment, remarking that some of the more emotional moments and darker themes were difficult to take seriously when played out by cutesy characters. Shkreli said that the story's "interesting and innovative" twists were still exciting, especially by the game's last third. He mentioned that the story's emotional center was grounded by the strong characterization between the party members, which he attributed to the optional skits. Vogel was impressed by the ambition in the narrative's "shocking" twists despite the initial impression of a "run-of-the-mill exercise in tired tropes". However, he deemed the "uneven" script to be stiff and unintentionally humorous, elaborating that "Some of these cutscenes cover a ridiculous range of emotions in just a minute or two, and dialogue rarely feels natural—it's the epitome of a 'video game script'". Dekker opined that the rareness of neat resolutions to conflicts improved the story, and he proclaimed that the game's cast is still the best in the series, although he said that some awkward localization held these elements back. He criticized the quest-tracking "synopsis" system as occasionally vague, which necessitated consultation of a walkthrough.

=== Sales and awards ===
Over 100,000 copies were sold in the United States during the first two weeks after its release. In December 2007, Namco announced that the GameCube version had sold 953,000 copies worldwide, and the PlayStation 2 port had sold 486,000 copies in Japan. The bargain reissue for the PlayStation 2 in 2005 sold almost 50,000 copies in Japan by the end of 2006. Its total worldwide sales for the GameCube and PS2 have reached 1.6 million units as of 2008. It was also the best-selling Tales title overseas, with more than half of its sales coming from outside Japan, having sold 600,000 units in North America and 250,000 in Europe as of 2008. The 2016 PC release sold more than 250,000 copies on Steam, as of April 2018. The game is estimated to have sold 2.4 million copies worldwide across all platforms, making it one of the best-selling titles in the franchise. GameSpot named it the best GameCube game of July 2004, and nominated it for the year-end "Best Role-playing Game" award across all platforms. The game has appeared on many top game rankings and received a Japan Game Awards in 2003 for excellence. During the 8th Annual Interactive Achievement Awards, the Academy of Interactive Arts & Sciences nominated Tales of Symphonia for "Console Role-Playing Game of the Year". The January 2009 issue of Game Informer listed it at #24 in its "Top 25 GameCube Games". Nintendo Power ranked Tales of Symphonia 107th in a list of "Top 200 Nintendo Games Ever". IGN users placed it 75th in a Top 100 Games list, while GameFAQs users put it at 81st in a similar list. In 2023, Time Extension included the game on their "Best JRPGs of All Time" list.
