= Day After Tomorrow (Day After Tomorrow album) =

Studio album by Day After Tomorrow
- Released: August 7, 2002
- Genre: J-pop
- Length: 28:25
- Label: Avex Trax
- Producer: Max Matsuura

Day After Tomorrow chronology
Day After Tomorrow (2002)	Day After Tomorrow II (2002)

Day After Tomorrow is the first studio album by Japanese J-pop band Day After Tomorrow.

== Track listing ==
All tracks are written by Misono Kōda.

No.	Title	Length
1.	"Prize"	4:18
2.	"Faraway"	5:13
3.	"Gradually"	4:52
4.	"Vivace"	3:43
5.	"For You"	4:27
6.	"Gift"	5:48

== Personnel ==
- Misono Kōda – vocals
- Masato Kitano – guitar
- Daisuke Suzuki – keyboard

== Charts ==
Chart positions for Day After Tomorrow
Chart	Peak
Japan (Oricon)	10
