= Primary Colors (album) =

Studio album by Day After Tomorrow
- Released: February 18, 2004
- Genre: J-pop
- Length: 61:21
- Label: Avex Trax

Day After Tomorrow chronology
Elements (2003)	Primary Colors (2004)	Day Alone (2005)

Primary Colors is the fourth studio album by Japanese J-pop band Day After Tomorrow. The first song on the album, "Starry Heavens", was used as the opening theme for the game Tales of Symphonia. It peaked at number 5 on Oricon Albums Chart.

== Track listing ==
No.	Title	Length
1.	"Starry Heavens"
2.	"Time Machine de Tsuredashite タイムマシーンで連れ出して"
3.	"Fitness フィットネス"
4.	"Show Time"
5.	"Itazura na Kiss イタズラなKiss"
6.	"Current"
7.	"Shoujo no Mama de Ita Ano Koro 少女のままでいたあの頃"
8.	"Regret"
9.	"Wind Flower 〜Spring Ephemeral〜"
10.	"Dear Friends"
11.	"These Days"
12.	"It's My Way"
13.	"Hotarubi 螢火"
