= Tales of Symphonia: Dawn of the New World =

2008 video game

- North American Wii box art
- Developer: Namco Tales Studio
- Publisher: Namco Bandai Games
- Directors: Kiyoshi Nagai; Eiji Kikuchi; Akihiro Arahori
- Designers: Akihiro Arahori; Masahiro Abe; Go Murai; Midori Takahashi; Seika Nagao
- Programmer: Katsutoshi Satō
- Artists: Daigo Okumura; Kōsuke Fujishima (original ToS character designs)
- Writer: Masaki Hiramatsu
- Composers: Motoi Sakuraba; Shinji Tamura
- Series: Tales
- Platforms: Wii, PlayStation 3
- Release: Wii: JP: June 26, 2008; NA: November 11, 2008; EU: November 13, 2009; AU: November 26, 2009; PlayStation 3: JP: October 10, 2013; NA: February 25, 2014; PAL: February 28, 2014
- Genre: Action role-playing
- Modes: Single-player, multiplayer

Tales of Symphonia: Dawn of the New World (Note: known in Japan as Tales of Symphonia: Knight of Ratatosk (テイルズ オブ シンフォニア -ラタトスクの騎士-, Teiruzu Obu Shinfonia -Ratatosuku no Kishi-),) is an action role-playing game developed by Namco Tales Studio and published by Namco Bandai Games for the Wii. The game is the eighteenth main title as well as a spin-off and sequel to Tales of Symphonia for the GameCube and PlayStation 2. The game was released in Japan on June 26, 2008, in North America on November 11, 2008, and in Europe on November 13, 2009.

Tales of Symphonia: Dawn of the New World and the original Tales of Symphonia were re-released together as a PlayStation 3 HD remaster under the title Tales of Symphonia Chronicles in October 2013 in Japan and February 2014 in North America and Europe.

== Gameplay ==
=== Battle system ===
Tales of Symphonia: Dawn of the New World uses the "Flex Range Element Enhanced Linear Motion Battle System" (FR:EE-LiMBS), combining aspects of Tales of the Abyss' and Tales of Destiny's battle systems, to create a battle experience comparable to Tales of Innocence's Dimension Stride Linear Motion Battle System. A key feature of this enhanced system is the Elemental Grid. Each battle location, skill, and monster has an elemental attribute. The battlefield's element can be altered by using three skills with the same elemental attribute. Changing the element of the field determines both the effectiveness of an attack, as well as the characters that can participate in Unison Attacks, which return from the original Symphonia. A meter on the lower part of the screen indicates when the attack can be unleashed. Another returning element of the series are Mystic Artes.

A fight between Emil and Decus.

Another new feature is the ability to capture, evolve, and level up over 200 monsters to fight alongside Emil. Monsters can be recruited once they have been defeated in battle while the elemental grid has four of the same element, as well as the main element matching them. In order to increase the odds of a successful recruitment, the element of the field should align with the element of the monster, and an altered version of the classic Tales affection system helps to persuade them to join the party. The monsters are controlled in battle by artificial intelligence. The party can only hold four monsters at a time; as such, those not in use can be stored in a pen at the Katz Guild. There are also several sidequests available at the Katz Guild.

The party obtains both experience points and GRADE after each battle. The number of Experience points gained is given to all members of the party, not divided. Once a certain amount has been accumulated, each character or monster will level up, thereby improving their stats and possibly gaining new skills. Another way to increase a monster's status parameters is by cooking them special recipes, when fed some monsters may be able to evolve into new forms, allowing for "monster customization." The original Symphonia cast, however, do not gain levels through experience points; instead, they gain levels during plot events. The amount of GRADE received depends on how each battle is fought. From the second playthrough on, collected GRADE can be used to purchase game options, or transfer items or skills to carry to the next file.

=== Presentation ===
The only animated segment in the game is its opening sequence. Most of the story is told through real-time cut scenes that were filmed using a motion capture system. Skits, which are short, optional conversations between the characters, make a return; unlike in previous North American releases, these skits are fully voiced. There is more voice acting in towns and dungeons than in the previous game. Much of the music in Dawn of the New World is remixed from the soundtrack of the original Tales of Symphonia. The game also has widescreen support. Furthermore, many of the assets and locations in the game have been taken directly from the original Tales of Symphonia, but the textures have been updated.

Dawn of the New World makes limited use of the Wii Remote's features. Rather than the fully explorable Field Map traditionally used in Tales games, a point-and-click system using the Wii Remote is used to navigate the world. The development team left the Field Map out due to production schedule deadlines. The pointer is also used for minigames and as a cursor for the Sorcerer's Ring.

=== North American additions ===
The North American version of Dawn of the New World has additional features that were not present in the Japanese release. New features include the ability to load cleared Tales of Symphonia game data to receive extra items or Gald at the beginning of the game. In addition to this, while not a new feature, the number of motion control shortcuts in battle has been increased from four in the Japanese version to eight for the North American version.

=== PAL additions ===
The PAL version of Dawn of the New World includes a Gallery Mode and head accessories for Emil and Marta. Gallery Mode contains a Skits Library containing viewable skits of the game, and an Image Library to view design sketches, illustrations, pack art and more. Head accessories include masks and head accessories which give new special effects during battles.

=== Chronicles Rerelease ===
In 2013, Bandai Namco announced a PlayStation 3 remastering of both Tales of Symphonia and Dawn of the New World. With Dawn of the New World, the updates for both the North American and PAL regions are included as standard, and a new control scheme was created which uses the PlayStation 3 controller exclusively, rather than using the PlayStation Move controller.

== Plot ==
=== Setting ===
During the events of the first game, Lloyd Irving and his companions embarked on a journey that led to the merging of the twin worlds of Sylvarant and Tethe'alla. After the lands became one, however, maps were rendered useless and the climate went through many vast changes: desert towns became frozen wastelands and lakes dried up into valleys. All of this stems from an overlooked factor in the unification of the worlds: the spirit of the old Kharlan Tree, Ratatosk, still exists somewhere, and its slumber has sent the world into chaos. To complicate matters, tensions have quickly escalated between the people of the two worlds. The Tethe'allans look down upon the Sylvaranti due to their inferior technology, and the Sylvaranti fear the Tethe'allans for their power. Two years have passed since the worlds were first merged, and Sylvaranti dissidents have created an insurgency, known variously as the "Sylvaranti Liberation Front" and the "Vanguard," with which to rise against the Church of Martel and the Tethe'allans.

=== Synopsis ===
The game begins when the Church of Martel goes to war with the Vanguard, and Sylvarant's city of Palmacosta is caught in the crossfire. Countless innocent lives are lost and the city is consumed in flames. This event comes to be known as the "Blood Purge," a massacre allegedly led by the same Lloyd Irving who helped unite the worlds two years before. Emil Castagnier, a Palmacostan boy, is forced to watch as his parents are killed by Lloyd. At the same time, a girl named Marta Lualdi is fleeing the Vanguard with Ratatosk's Core, an orb which contains the essence of the sleeping spirit; cornered by Vanguard soldiers, she appeals to Ratatosk for help, and awakens to see Emil standing over the foes' bodies.

Six months later, Emil now lives in Luin with his aunt and uncle, who abuse him physically and emotionally; he is also bullied by the people of the city, who view Lloyd as a hero due to Lloyd's efforts two years ago to rebuild the town. As a result, Emil is timid, retiring and often unwilling to speak, much less express his true thoughts. However, while investigating local meteorological disturbances, he encounters Marta, who helps him defend himself from some monsters and then flees from her pursuers, both Vanguard and the enigmatic Richter Abend. Richter is a source of confusion to Emil: he speaks brusquely but encourages him to stand up for himself. Richter is attempting to retrieve Ratatosk's Core, which has bonded physically to Marta and is visible only as a glyph on her forehead. Caught between the only two people who have been nice to him in a very long time, Emil decides to help Marta. With the aid of Tenebrae, a Centurion Spirit who serves Ratatosk, Emil pledges himself as a "Knight of Ratatosk," gaining a direct link to the Summon Spirit and a second, hyper-aggressive personality which aids him in battle.

After the three have escaped, Marta explains her plight: she is a former member of the Vanguard, who want to use Ratatosk's power for their own nefarious ends. Ratatosk is also the cause of the weather problems plaguing the world: Tenebrae, as well as seven other Centurions, are supposed to be regulating the flow of mana via the world's monsters, but ever since the Giant Kharlan Tree was destroyed four thousand years ago they have remained dormant. To restore balance to the world's environment, all of them must be awoken from their Cores, Ratatosk last of all; and to strengthen them, Emil must recruit monsters, as recounted above. Emil and Marta pledge to do so, though Emil also has a secondary motive: he wants to find Lloyd Irving, who slew his parents, and get some answers, or at least some vengeance.

As the two travel the world, it becomes clear that neither task will be as easy as it sounds. For one, not only are the Vanguard, led by the sadistic Alice and self-absorbed Decus, attempting to collect the Centurion Cores, but so is Lloyd Irving. For two, the pair frequently run into former party members from Tales of Symphonia, all of whom vouch for Lloyd's character whilst simultaneously befriending Emil and Marta, often lending their prowess as temporary player characters. Emil is left in the uncomfortable position of realizing that his hatred of Lloyd must be misplaced, as his associates are of impeccable character; simultaneously, Lloyd's friends admit that, though they believe in him, his current methods are clearly extreme. For three, Emil continues to encounter Richter, with whom he has a rather confusing relationship; Richter encourages his personal growth, even giving him his catchphrase--"Courage is the magic that turns dreams into reality"—but simultaneously insisting that one day he will attempt to remove Ratatosk's Core from Marta's forehead by lethal force. And finally, Emil must deal with his secondary personality, which he calls "Ratatosk Mode." Ratatosk Mode is brusque, selfish, insensitive and prone to dismiss Marta as an annoyance—which Marta, whose budding attraction to Emil is anything but subtle, does not take very well. Even worse, Ratatosk Mode begins to take over, remaining present even while out of battle and often verbally refusing to relinquish control of his host body.

The first of these mysteries is finally unraveled when Lloyd seizes not just the core of Glacies, Centurion of Ice, but its owner, Seles Wilder, sister of Tethe'allan Chosen Zelos Wilder. Zelos notices that Lloyd is using an especially cloying cologne, which Marta realizes is the same scent Decus uses. Decus has been impersonating Lloyd and is the true perpetrator of at least some of his atrocities. Richter's insistence on defeating Ratatosk begins to unravel when he refers to Emil as "Aster," a name Emil also begins to hear when he visits the college town of Sybak. Aster was a former scholar who began to investigate Ratatosk after the two worlds were combined, with the half-elf scholar Richter by his side. A series of flashbacks reveal that Ratatosk, awakened to the state of the world and the death of the Giant Kharlan Tree which was his to protect, lashed out in anger, slaying Aster without remorse. Richter, furious, swore revenge, despite the fact that Ratatosk now wears Aster's face: when Marta begged Ratatosk for help, he manifested himself as a human, grabbing the nearest body to hand, and creating a fake personality for himself to fill in the gaps, becoming Emil.

The largest complication arises from Richter's agenda. He has traveled to the Ginnungagap, the gate that separates Niflheim, the realm of the demons, from the mortal world, and made a devil's bargain to slay Ratatosk, who sustains the gate with his life, in exchange for Aster's revival. Lloyd has caught wind of this and is gathering up the Centurions' Cores to prevent his success; his unwillingness to explain himself to his friends is characterized as a ploy to protect the new World Tree they planted two years ago. Now aligned in purpose, Emil, Marta and the Tales of Symphonia characters advance to the Ginnungagap to stop Richter from laying all of Tethe'alla and Sylvarant bare to the depredations of demons. Once defeated, though, Richter reviles them for their shortsightedness: he had already made plans to double-cross the demons, using himself as a new barrier, prepared to suffer eternal torment for the sake of his innocent friend. Emil also attempts at this point to display his own self-sacrificial tendencies, trying to goad his friends into slaying him to shore up the demon gate, as well as atone for Ratatosk's murder of Aster. In the end, the gate is re-sealed by the combined efforts of Richter and Lord Ratatosk, but Emil's precise fate depends on the player's choices throughout the game: he may slay himself after wounding Marta through his play-acting; be imprisoned along with Richter; or be released, through the urging of both Tenebrae, Aqua, and Richter, to live out his life with Marta.

== Development ==
The opening music has been reworked into an orchestral theme for the English version of the game, similar to what was done to Tales of Symphonia. The Japanese version's theme song is "Nininsankyaku" (二人三脚, "Three-Legged Race" or lit. "Two People, Three Legs") by misono. It was remixed as "Nininsankyaku ver. 2013" (二人三脚 ver.2013, "Three-Legged Race ver. 2013" or lit. "Two People, Three Legs ver. 2013"), which is also performed by misono, in the PS3 release.

The original soundtrack for Dawn of the New World spanning four CDs was released on July 9, 2008. A bonus DVD containing original animation involving the cast of Tales of Symphonia was given for those who preordered the game in Japan.

== Reception ==
Reception

Aggregate score
Aggregator	Score
Metacritic	68/100

Review scores
Publication	Score
1Up.com	C+
Edge	6/10
Famitsu	(W+DS) 35/40; 31/40
GameSpot	6.5/10
GameTrailers	7.9/10
GameZone	7.1/10
IGN	6.7/10
Nintendo Power	8/10
Nintendo World Report	6/10
Official Nintendo Magazine	67%
The A.V. Club	C+

Dawn of the New World sold 120,000 copies in Japan on its first day of release and concluded the week of June 23 to June 29 (with Dawn of the New World being released on the 26th) with over 151,000 copies sold. This made it the bestselling game of that week. In a report detailing Namco Bandai's results for the first fiscal quarter 2009, the company revealed that Dawn of the New World had sold over 215,000 copies in Japan by 6 August 2008. The game was later released under Nintendo's "Everyone’s Recommendation Selection" of budget titles in Japan.

Since the game's release, Dawn of the New World received "average" reviews according to video game review aggregator Metacritic.

There were conflicting opinions about voice acting on IGN: Mark Bozon stated that the voice acting was stronger than the previous game, whereas Matt Casamassina said that "the voice acting is...simply atrocious". Nintendojo expressed their disappointment when it was learned that Scott Menville did not return as the voice of Lloyd Irving.

Reviewers of Famitsu gave a score of three eights and one seven, for a total of 31 out of 40, whereas Famitsu Wii+DS's reviewers gave it a score of one nine, one seven, one ten, and one nine, for a total of 35 out of 40.

Emil was listed as the fourth most irritating RPG protagonist of all time by 1UP.com.
