= Mayo Okamoto =

Japanese pop singer and songwriter (born 1974)

- Born: January 9, 1974 (age 52)
- Origin: Nakamura, Kōchi, Japan
- Genres: J-pop
- Occupation: Singer-songwriter
- Instrument: Vocals
- Years active: 1995–present
- Labels: Tokuma Japan; Avex; Nippon Crown
- Website: www.mayo-okamoto.com

Mayo Okamoto (岡本 真夜, Okamoto Mayo; born January 9, 1974, in Nakamura, Kōchi) is a Japanese pop singer and songwriter.

Her 1995 debut single "Tomorrow" peaked at number 1 on the Oricon weekly single charts. This was the theme song for TBS drama "Second Chance" in 1995, and covered for rhythm game Donkey Konga 3 in 2005.

She released her greatest hits album Rise 1 in 2000. The album topped the Oricon weekly album charts.

Her song "Itsuka Kitto" is the Japanese theme song for the dub of Chicken Little.

== Expo 2010 Shanghai China theme song plagiarism ==
It was alleged that the promotional song for Expo 2010 Shanghai China, "Right Here Waiting for You 2010", was plagiarized from Okamoto's 1997 song "Sonomama no Kimi de Ite". Okamoto's agency later announced that the Expo Committee subsequently requested permission to use the song, to which Okamoto's agency agreed.

== Discography ==
=== Albums ===
- Sun&Moon (1995/6/10)
- Pureness (1996/3/16)
- Smile (1997/3/5)
- Hello (1998/4/29)
- Crystal Scenery (1998/12/9) (mini-album)
- Mahō no Ring ni Kiss o Shite (魔法のリングにkissをして) (1999/8/4)
- Dear... (2002/3/20)
- Saikai (Kimi ni Tsuzuru) (再会〜君に綴る〜) (2005/5/18)
- Wonderful Colors (2006/1/25) (mini-album)
- Soul Love (2006/12/6)
- seasons (2008/10/29)
- Crystal Scenery II (2009/05/27)

=== Compilations ===
- Mayo Okamoto Best Rise 1 (2000/5/31)
- Mō Ichido Ano Koro no Sora o (もう一度あの頃の空を) (2003/10/22)

=== Singles ===
- Tomorrow (1995/5/10)
- Forever (1996/2/12)
- Alone (1996/11/5)
- Sonomama no Kimi de Ite (そのままの君でいて) (1997/1/16)
- Nakechauhodo Setsunaikedo (泣けちゃうほど せつないけど) (1997/3/5)
- Sayonara/Hoshizora no Sanpomichi (サヨナラ/星空の散歩道) (1997/11/19)
- Daijōbudayo (大丈夫だよ) (1998/2/25)
- Omoide ni Dekinakute (想い出にできなくて) (1998/4/16)
- Everlasting (1998/11/18)
- Takaramono (宝物) (1999/2/10)
- Kono Hoshizora no Kanata (この星空の彼方) (1999/7/7)
- Hapihapi Birthday/Itoshii Hito yo (Remember Me) (ハピハピ バースデイ/愛しい人よ～remember me～) (2001/12/21)
- Dear... (2002/3/13)
- Life (2003/1/22)
- Ai to Iu Na no Hana (愛という名の花) (2003/3/19)
- Kakegae nai Hito yo (かけがえない人よ) (2005/1/13)
- Utsukushiki Hito (美しき人) (2005/4/20)
- Itsuka Kitto (いつかきっと) (2005/11/30)
- Dōsōkai (Dear My Friends) (同窓会～Dear My Friends～) (2006/10/25)
- Destiny (2008/8/6)

=== Videos ===
- Pureness '96 (1996/8/21)
- Mayo Okamoto Smile Tour '97(VHS) (1997/9/19)
- Mayo Okamoto Smile Tour '97(DVD) (2000/6/28)
- Mayo Okamoto Hello Tour '98(VHS) (1998/10/21)
- Mayo Okamoto Hello Tour '98(DVD) (2000/6/28)
- Mayo Okamoto Tour '99 – Maho no Ring (2000/4/5)
- Mayo Okamoto Tour 2000 -RISE- (2001/11/8)
- Mayo Okamoto Clip 1995–1998 (2002/4/3)
- Mayo Okamoto Clip 1998–2002 (2002/4/3)
