= Daisuke Suzuki (musician) =

Japanese musician & composer (born 1978)

- Also known as: Rubii
- Born: October 27, 1978 (age 47)
- Origin: Kanagawa Prefecture, Japan
- Genres: J-Pop
- Occupation: Composer
- Years active: 1998–present
- Label: Avex Trax
- Formerly of: Day After Tomorrow
- Website: girlnextdoor.jp/

Daisuke Suzuki (鈴木 大輔, Suzuki Daisuke; born October 27, 1978 in Kanagawa Prefecture, Japan) is the songwriter of J-Pop group Girl Next Door. He debuted as Rubii in 1998.
