= Day Alone =

Studio album by Day After Tomorrow
- Released: March 9, 2005
- Genre: J-pop
- Length: 52:55
- Label: Avex Trax

Day After Tomorrow chronology
Primary Colors (2004)	Day Alone (2005)	Single Best (2005)

Day Alone is the final studio album by Japanese J-pop band Day After Tomorrow.

== Track listing ==
No.	Title	Length
1.	"Kimi to Aeta Kiseki"
2.	"God Bless me!"
3.	"Setunasa ha Kono Mune no Naka Ni"
4.	"Nanatu Hoshi wo Kazoetara"
5.	"Lost Angel"
6.	"Where so ever"
7.	"Honestly"
8.	"Tuishin"
9.	"Yuri no Hana"
10.	"Meisou"
11.	"Soshite Boku ni Dekiru Koto"
12.	"More than a Million Miles"
