= George Tokoro =

Japanese Singer-songwriter, comedian, tarento

- 所ジョージ
- Born: January 26, 1955 (age 71); Tokorozawa, Saitama, Japan
- Education: Takushoku University
- Occupations: Comedian, singer-songwriter, TV personality
- Years active: 1977 - present

Takayuki Haga (芳賀 隆之, Haga Takayuki; born January 26, 1955), better known by the stage name George Tokoro (所ジョージ, Tokoro Jōji), is a Japanese comedian, TV personality, singer-songwriter, and essayist. Born in Tokorozawa, Saitama, he attended Takushoku University's Commercial Science class.

== Works ==
=== Film ===
- Shimoochiai Yakitori Movie (1979) - Eiji Yaguruma
- Madadayo (1993) - Amaki
- Ponyo (2008) - Fujimoto (voice)

=== Video games ===
- Tokoro-san no Mamoru mo Semeru mo (27 June 1986, Epic Sony, Family Computer)
- Tokoro-san no Mah Mahjong! (1992, Arcade game, Sega, Sega System 24)
- Tokoro-san no Mah Mahjong 2: Tokoro's Cup (1994, Sega, Arcade game, Sega System 24)
- Tokoro's Mahjong (1994, Vic Tokai, Super Famicom)
- Tokoro's Mahjong Jr. (1994, Vic Tokai, Game Boy)
- Tokoro-san no Daifugou (2000, Konami, PlayStation)
- Tokoro-San no Setagaya Country Club (2000, Natsume, Game Boy Color)
- Jagainu-kun (2000, Victor, Game Boy Color - Composer)

=== Japanese dub ===
==== Live-action ====
- ALF - ALF
- Look Who's Talking - Mikey
- Look Who's Talking Too - Michael "Mikey" Jensen-Ubriacco

==== Animation ====
- Howard the Duck (Fuji TV edition) - Howard the Duck
- Ralph Breaks the Internet - Buzz Lightyear
- The Simpsons Movie - Homer Simpson
- Toy Story - Buzz Lightyear
- Toy Story 2 - Buzz Lightyear
- Toy Story 3 - Buzz Lightyear
- Toy Story 4 - Buzz Lightyear
- Toy Story 5 - Buzz Lightyear
