= Lovely Cat's Eye =

"Lovely♡Cat's Eye"

Single by misono

from the album Never+Land
- B-side: "Tomorrow"
- Released: November 1, 2006
- Recorded: 2006
- Genre: J-Pop, pop/rock
- Label: Avex Trax; CD (AVCD-31088); CD+DVD (AVCD-31087/B)
- Songwriter: misono

Misono singles chronology
"Speedrive" (2006)	"Lovely♡Cat's Eye" (2006)	"Pochi" (2007)

Alternative cover
- CD+DVD

Lovely♡Cat's Eye (ラブリー♡キャッツアイ) is the fourth single by Japanese singer-songwriter misono. The single peaked at No. 9 on the Oricon charts, but dropped in rank to take the No. 15 slot.

The title track was used as a promotional track for the Tales of the Tempest video game, while the b-side, "Tomorrow," was used to help promote Glico's Cafe au Lait.

== Background ==
Lovely♡Cat's Eye (ラブリー♡キャッツアイ) is the fourth single by Japanese soloist misono under the Avex label. The single peaked in the top ten on the Oricon Singles Charts at No. 9, but fell in ranking throughout the week to take the No. 14 position, remaining on the charts for four consecutive weeks. The single was released in both CD and a CD+DVD combo, with the compact disc containing the title track, the b-side "Tomorrow" and their respective instrumentals. The DVD housed the music video for "Lovely♡Cat's Eye."

The b-side, "Tomorrow," was used for promotional purposes for Glico's Cafe au Lait, while "Lovely♡Cat's Eye" was used to help promote the role-playing video game Tales of the Tempest, of which her song "VS" was the opening theme. "Tomorrow" was a cover of the original song by Mayo Okamoto, which was later released on her Sun & Moon in June 1995.

"Lovely♡Cat's Eye" was arranged by Takahiro Izutani, who composed the music for the Tales of the Tempest and for the other Tales of series. Takahiro worked with misono for her previous singles, as had the musical arranger for the song, Susumu Nishikawa of Diamond Head. misono wrote the lyrics to the piece. "Tomorrow" was originally written by Mayo Okamoto in 1995, with lyrics by Mayo and Anju Mana. For misono's rendition, Gakuji "CHABE" Matsuda performed the modern instrumentals.

The single followed her released of Speedrive and was her second-to-last single before the release of her first studio album Never+Land. As with her other singles, the music video for "Lovely♡Cat's Eye" stayed in-tune with the fairy tale theme, this time taking inspiration from the 1908 French play The Blue Bird. Along with The Blue Bird, the theme of Alice in Wonderland is also present, with misono eating a treat and growing.

== Music video ==
The music video for "Lovely♡Cat's Eye" was based loosely on the French play The Blue Bird, most notably the ending, in which the Tyltyl's bluebird escapes before being given to the sick child.

The video opens with misono watching the news, when a wanted poster shows a reward to anyone who can find and catch the escaped bluebird. misono, who is show to be a humanized version of a feline, leaves with a birdcage in an attempt to collect the reward money. After failing to physically catch the bird, a handgun falls from the sky, which she uses to shoot it. However, this results in the bird's death. Distraught over accidentally killing it, the timeline rewinds, this time with misono avoiding the weapon. As an homage to the fairy tale Alice in Wonderland, misono eats a treat and grows exponentially. This also results in her failure to capture the bluebird. Returning to her original state, the bird flies towards her, becoming an everlasting symbol of happiness on her nose.

== Reception ==
RPGFan wrote: "I have mixed feelings about “Lovely Cat’s Eye.” The melody is interesting in some spots, but it can get a bit too edgy for my tastes."

== Track listing ==
CD
No.	Title	Lyrics	Music	Arranger(s)	Length
1.	"Lovely♡Cat's Eye" (ラブリー♡キャッツアイ)	misono	Susumu Nishikawa	Takahiro Izutani	4:29
2.	"Tomorrow"	Mayo Okamoto • Anju Mana	Gakuji "CHABE" Matsuda	Mayo Okamoto	4:20
3.	"Lovely♡Cat's Eye" (Instrumental)		Susumu Nishikawa	Takahiro Izutani	4:29
4.	"Tomorrow" (Instrumental)		Gakuji "CHABE" Matsuda	Mayo Okamoto	4:18

DVD
No.	Title	Length
1.	"Lovely♡Cat's Eye" (Video Clip)

== Charts ==
=== Oricon sales chart (Japan) ===
Release	Chart	Peak position	First week sales	Sales total	Chart run
November 1, 2006	Oricon Daily Singles Chart	9			
November 1, 2006	Oricon Weekly Singles Chart	14	11,688 copies	16,957 copies	2 weeks
November 1, 2006	Oricon Monthly Singles Chart				
November 1, 2006	Oricon Yearly Singles Chart				
