= Day After Tomorrow (band) =

Japanese J-pop band

- Origin: Japan
- Genres: Pop
- Years active: 2001–2005
- Label: Avex Trax
- Members: Misono; Masato Kitano; Daisuke Suzuki
- Website: dat-net.jp

Day After Tomorrow (also known as dat) was a 3-member Japanese pop band under the Avex label.

== History ==
Due to their music being produced by former Every Little Thing member Mitsuru Igarashi, Day After Tomorrow's music took on a decidedly similar feel to that group's music, particularly the more synthpop-based music that Every Little Thing released in their earlier years. As of the release of their best albums in August 2005, Day After Tomorrow had gone on hiatus.

Since the hiatus, Misono had performed as a soloist between 2006 and 2014, after which she quit music, though still performs on television variety programs. Daisuke Suzuki went on to play keyboard for the band Girl Next Door.

Misono's older sister is Koda Kumi.

Day After Tomorrow performed the theme song "More than a Million Miles" for the Japanese release of the movie coincidentally called The Day After Tomorrow.

== Members ==
- Misono (みその), real name: Misono Kōda (神田美苑) – born October 13, 1984; vocalist and songwriter
- Masato Kitano (北野正人) (nicknamed Maa-kun) – born October 25, 1974; guitarist and composer
- Daisuke Suzuki (鈴木大輔) (nicknamed Dai-chan) – born October 27, 1978; keyboardist and composer

== Discography ==
=== Albums ===
==== Studio albums ====
- Day After Tomorrow (August 7, 2002)
- Day After Tomorrow II (November 20, 2002)
- Elements (March 26, 2003)
- Primary Colors (February 18, 2004)
- Day Alone (March 9, 2005)

==== Greatest hits ====
- Complete Best (Day After Tomorrow album)|Complete Best (August 17, 2005),(September 20, 2006)
- Single Best (August 17, 2005)
- Selection Best (September 20, 2006)

=== Singles ===
- Faraway (August 28, 2002)
- My Faith (December 4, 2002)
- Futurity (January 22, 2003)
- Stay in My Heart (April 16, 2003)
- Day Star (July 24, 2003)
- Moon Gate (September 3, 2003)
- Dear Friends / It's My Way (December 17, 2003)
- 螢火 ／Show Time Hotarubi / Show Time (February 4, 2004)
- Lost Angel (August 25, 2004)
- 君と逢えた奇蹟 Kimi to Aeta Kiseki (January 13, 2005)
- ユリノハナ Yuri no Hana (February 23, 2005)

== Videography ==
- Faraway (August 7, 2002)
- My Faith (November 20, 2002)
- Day Alive: 1st Live Tour 2003 Elements (December 17, 2003),(December 8, 2004)
- Day Clips (March 10, 2004)
- More than a Million Miles (June 9, 2004)
- Lost Angel: Ano hi、Midori ni kimi ga Ite (September 29, 2004)
- Day Alone: Manohra to Hime-chan (March 24, 2005)
