= Misono =

Japanese singer (born 1984)

- Born: Misono Kōda (神田 美苑); October 13, 1984 (age 41); Kyoto, Japan
- Occupation: Singer-songwriter
- Years active: 2000–present
- Musical career
- Genres: Pop; rock
- Instruments: Vocals; guitar
- Label: Avex Trax
- Website: www.avexnet.or.jp/misono/

Misono Kōda (神田 美苑, Kōda Misono), publicly known mononymously as Misono (stylized in lowercase), is a Japanese singer-songwriter and TV personality. She is the younger sister of singer Koda Kumi.

== Career ==
=== Early career ===
In 2000, Misono participated in the summer vacation audition organized by Japanese music label Avex, and was subsequently chosen by the company to become one of its singers. In 2002, she debuted as the vocalist of Day After Tomorrow (DAT), a J-pop band formed by the Avex Trax label under the production of Mitsuru Igarashi. Only five months after their debut, they received the Newcomer of the Year award at the Japan Record Awards. In August 2015, after the release of their first greatest hits album, dat went on an indefinite hiatus.

=== Solo debut ===
In 2006, Misono debuted as a solo artist with the release of her first single, "VS", which was used as the theme song for the Nintendo DS video game Tales of the Tempest, following previous songs by day after tomorrow that were used in this videogame franchise. The single debuted at number 4 on the Oricon charts. During this period, Misono used classical Western fairytales as inspiration for her visuals in music videos and promotional photographs, using themes such as Snow White ("VS"), Cinderella ("Kojin Jugyō"), The Ugly Duckling ("Speedrive"), and Peter Pan for her first studio album, Never+Land, released on February 2, 2007.

After the release of her first album, Misono's music style switch into more punk rock-oriented pop songs. Three singles – produced by Straightener's Hidekazu Hinata, GO!GO!7188, and Onsoku Line, respectively – were released between September 2007 and January 2008. These songs were subsequently part of misono's second studio album, Say, which was released on July 16, 2008.

In November 2007, Misono became a recurrent guest in Fuji TV variety show Quiz! Hexagon II, and during these period she participated in said show's comedic units Misono & Hiroshi with Hiroshi Shinagawa, and "Mai Satoda with Kyōdai Gōda" with Mai Satoda and Toshifumi Fujimoto. On March 31, 2009, she collaborated with her sister Kumi Koda for "It's All Love!", which became her single to top the Oricon charts and was certified gold by the Recording Industry Association of Japan.

Between 2009 and 2013, Misono released two cover albums, on which she covered several anisons and popular songs by artists such as Avril Lavigne, Mayo Okamoto, Sayuri Ishikawa, as well as self-covers of day after tomorrow. She also released two mini compilations of her songs used for the Tales saga, and her third studio album, Me, on June 30, 2010.

=== 2010s ===
Misono released her fourth studio album, Uchi, on October 13, 2014, coinciding her 30th birthday. The album became a topic on social media due to an official note added to the album title which said "If the album doesn't sell 10k copies, misono won't be able to release another CD." The album failed to sell over 10k copies and questions were raised about Misono's possible retirement. However, she stated that that was not the case; she would just stop releasing albums, but she would not retire from the entertainment business. Her contract with Avex Management ended on October 31, 2018.

== Personal life ==
On July 16, 2017, Misono married Shinnosuke Nakamura, who is the drummer for Japanese rock band Highside.

After being hospitalized from March 29 to April 5, 2019, due to an unknown illness, it was revealed that Misono had been diagnosed with Ménière's disease in October 2019.

== Discography ==
=== Studio albums ===
- 2007: Never+Land
- 2008: Say
- 2010: Me
- 2014: Uchi

=== Compilation albums ===
- 2009: Tales with misono-Best-
- 2009: Cover Album
- 2010: Cover Album 2
- 2013: Symphony with Misono Best
