= Itsumademo... Teddy Bear =

"Itsumademo... Teddy Bear / Koitsuri Girl Ai Girl ~Fishing Boy~"

Single by misono

from the album Uchi
- Released: 7 November 2012
- Genre: J-pop, pop/rock
- Label: Avex Trax (Japan)

Misono singles chronology
| "'Maialino!'" (2012) | "Itsumademo... Teddy Bear / Koitsuri Girl Ai Girl ~Fishing Boy~" (2012) |

Alternative covers
- CD+DVD

Itsumademo... Teddy Bear / Koitsuri Girl Ai Girl ~Fishing Boy~ (いつまでも… テディベア／恋つりGirl 愛ガァル～フィッシングBoy～ / Forever... Teddy Bear / Carp Fishing Girl Love Girl ~Fishing Boy~) is the third single by Japanese artist misono under the pseudonym "Me", and nineteenth single overall. The single charted low on the Oricon charts, only reaching No. 77 and remaining on the charts for two weeks. It became her last single released before her fourth studio album Uchi, and her final single as an artist.

As with her previous single, Maialino!, misono collaborated with Mono Comme Ça, a fashion brand throughout Japan.

== Information ==
Itsumademo... Teddy Bear / Koitsuri Girl Ai Girl ~Fishing Boy~ is Japanese singer-songwriter misono's nineteenth solo single and third under the pseudonym "Me." The single became her lowest ranking on the Oricon Singles Charts, coming in at No. 77 and only remaining on the charts for two consecutive weeks. In total, the single had sold 1,352 units during its run.

For the single, misono worked with fashion apparel designer and distributor Mono Comme Ça (MONO COMME ÇA), a popular brand throughout Japan. She had worked with the brand for her previous single Maialino!. The first track of the single, "Itsumademo... Teddy Bear," became the theme song for the 110th anniversary of the Steiff teddy bear, which was designed by Richard Steiff in 1902.

Itsumademo... Teddy Bear was released as both a standard CD and a CD+DVD combination. Along with both a-sides and their corresponding instrumentals, the song "Second season Girl Friend ~Onna Tomodachi? Imouto Teki Sonzai? Tada no Osananajimi? Renai Taishou? Tomodachi Ijou? Koibito Miman? 2 Banme Demo Nai? Suki Demo Kirai Demo Nai? Tsugou no Ii Onna Domari?~" (セカンドseasonガールFRIEND〜女友達?妹的存在?ただの幼なじみ?恋愛対象?友達以上?恋人未満?2番目でもない?好きでも嫌いでもない?都合のいい女どまり?〜 / Second season Girl Friend ~Sisterhood? Childhood friend? Romance? More than friends? Sweethearts? Second time? Do you like me or not? Do you prefer women?~) and its instrumental was also included. Despite one of the main promotional tracks for the single being "Itsumademo... Teddy Bear," it was omitted from the corresponding album Uchi. However, both "Koitsuri Girl Ai Girl ~Fishing Boy~" and the b-side "Second season Girl FRIEND ~Onna Tomodachi? Imouto Teki Sonzai? Tada no Osananajimi? Renai Taishou? Tomodachi Ijou? Koibito Miman? 2 Banme Demo Nai? Suki Demo Kirai Demo Nai? Tsugou no Ii Onna Domari?~" were included on the album. Of the two a-sides, only "Koitsuri Girl Ai Girl ~Fishing Boy~" received a music video.

"Itsumademo... Teddy Bear" was composed by musical composer AKIRASTAR, with the lyrical portion written by Toshio-chan. AKIRASTAR also composed the music for "Koitsuri Girl Ai Girl ~Fishing Boy~," while misono wrote the lyrics. For "Second season Girl Friend ~Onna Tomodachi? Imouto Teki Sonzai? Tada no Osananajimi? Renai Taishou? Tomodachi Ijou? Koibito Miman? 2 Banme Demo Nai? Suki Demo Kirai Demo Nai? Tsugou no Ii Onna Domari?~", however, misono worked closely with famous composer Yasunari Nakamura, who had also worked with her sister Kumi Koda, the group Every Little Thing and TRF, among others.

Not only was the single misono's final single before her fourth studio album, Uchi but it would be her last single released as a soloist, whereas the corresponding album failed to sell ten thousand units.

== Music video ==
Despite being an a-side, "Itsumademo... Teddy Bear" did not receive a music video. The only track on the single to garner a music video was "Koitsuri Girl Ai Girl ~Fishing Boy~."

In the video, misono takes on several incarnations while singing and dancing in a Kaitenzushi sushi restaurant, while the chefs behind the conveyor belt prepare the sushi and perform comedic antics in the background. misono dons bright attire in the video, giving into her "Me" persona, which she began using with her Ho・n・to・u・so/Su・ki・ra・i single a year prior.

The video would later be placed on the DVD of her Uchi album as track No. 4.

== Track listing ==
CD
| No. | Title | Lyrics | Music | Length |
|---|---|---|---|---|
| 1. | "Itsumademo... Teddy Bear" (いつまでも… テディベア) | Toshio-chan | AKIRASTAR | 4:09 |
| 2. | "Koitsuri Girl Ai Girl ~Fishing Boy~" (恋つりGirl 愛ガァル～フィッシングBoy～) | misono | AKIRASTAR | 6:15 |
| 3. | "Second season Girl Friend ~Onna Tomodachi? Imouto Teki Sonzai? Tada no Osananajimi? Renai Taishou? Tomodachi Ijou? Koibito Miman? 2 Banme Demo Nai? Suki Demo Kirai Demo Nai? Tsugou no Ii Onna Domari?~" (セカンドseasonガールFRIEND～女友達?妹的存在?ただの幼なじみ?恋愛対象?友達以上?恋人未満?2番目でもない?好きでも嫌いでもない?都合のいい女どまり?～) | misono | Yasunari Nakamura | 6:01 |
| 4. | "Itsumademo... Teddy Bear" (Instrumental) | | AKIRASTAR | 4:09 |
| 5. | "Koitsuri Girl Ai Girl ~Fishing Boy~" (Instrumental) | | AKIRASTAR | 6:15 |
| 6. | "Second season Girl Friend ~Onna Tomodachi? Imouto Teki Sonzai? Tada no Osananajimi? Renai Taishou? Tomodachi Ijou? Koibito Miman? 2 Banme Demo Nai? Suki Demo Kirai Demo Nai? Tsugou no Ii Onna Domari?~" (Instrumental) | | Yasunari Nakamura | 6:01 |

DVD
| No. | Title | Length |
|---|---|---|
| 1. | "Koitsuri Girl Ai Girl ~Fishing Boy~" (Music Video) | 6:22 |

== Charts ==
=== Chart Ranking (Japan) ===
| Week | Rank | Sales |
|---|---|---|
| 1 | 77 | 1,352 |

Total sales: 1,352
