= Steiff (disambiguation) =

Steiff (German pronunciation: [ʃtaɪf]) most often refers to Margarete Steiff GmbH, a German plush toy company, or the toys it produces.

Steiff may also refer to:

- Margarete Steiff (1847–1909), founder of the company
- Richard Steiff (1877–1939), toy designer for the company, nephew of Margarete Steiff
