= Dorset Teddy Bear Museum =

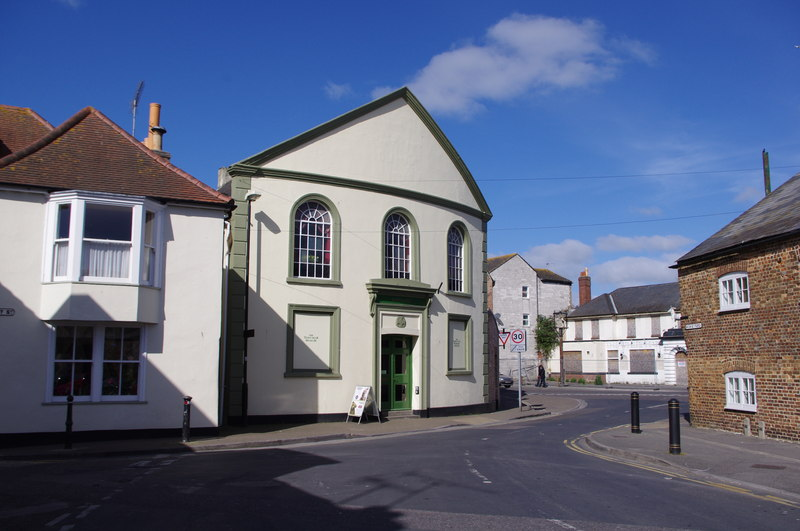
- Location: Dorchester, Dorset, England
- Coordinates: 50.71547°N 2.43283°W
- Type: Teddy bear museum
- Website: The Dorset Teddy Bear Museum website

The Dorset Teddy Bear Museum is a teddy bear museum in Dorchester, Dorset, south west England. It opened in 1990 in Bournemouth, before moving to Dorchester in 1995. It is the oldest teddy bear museum in the UK.

== History ==
The museum displays antique, famous, and other teddy bears. It initially opened in 1990, in Bournemouth under the name of 'The Bournemouth Bears', but moved to a Victorian building in Dorchester in 1995, at this point being renamed as Teddy Bear House. It relocated once more, and was renamed as The Dorset Teddy Bear Museum. It is regarded as the oldest teddy bear museum in Britain. The Dorset Teddy Bear Museum is owned by World Heritage, who also own the Terracotta Warriors Museum, Dinosaur Museum, and the Tutankhamun Exhibition, also located in Dorchester.

== Collections ==
The bears are displayed in a Victorian house which has been decorated with a period interior, with a life-sized bear named 'Edward Bear', along with his family, posed throughout. These bears, also have their own collection of teddy bears.

The museum has a number of famous bears from television shows and literary works on display including Paddington Bear, Rupert Bear, Winnie the Pooh, Sooty and Sweep, and Yogi Bear.

The earliest bear in the museum dates from 1906. In addition to this, there are bears from well-regarded manufacturers in the collection, including Steiff, Merrythought, and Chad Valley. The museum also holds replicas of a number of bears famous for fetching large sums of money at auction.

The museum also has a gift shop.
