= Morris Michtom =

American toy inventor

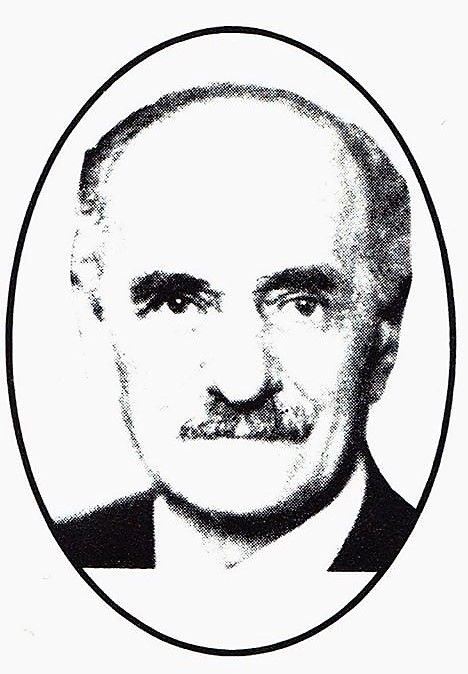
- Michtom in New York
- Born: September 12, 1869; Russian Empire
- Died: July 21, 1938 (aged 68); Brooklyn, New York
- Occupations: Inventor, businessman
- Spouse: Rose
- Children: Emily (1897–1986) and Joseph (1890–1951)

Morris Michtom (September 12, 1869 – July 21, 1938) was a Russian-born businessman and inventor who, with his wife Rose, also a Russian Jewish immigrant who lived in Brooklyn, founded the Ideal Novelty and Toy Company. Michtom came up with the idea for the teddy bear in 1902 (the same time Richard Steiff in Germany came up with an idea for a stuffed toy bear with movable limbs). After Michtom's death, the company became the largest doll-making company in the United States.

== Biography ==
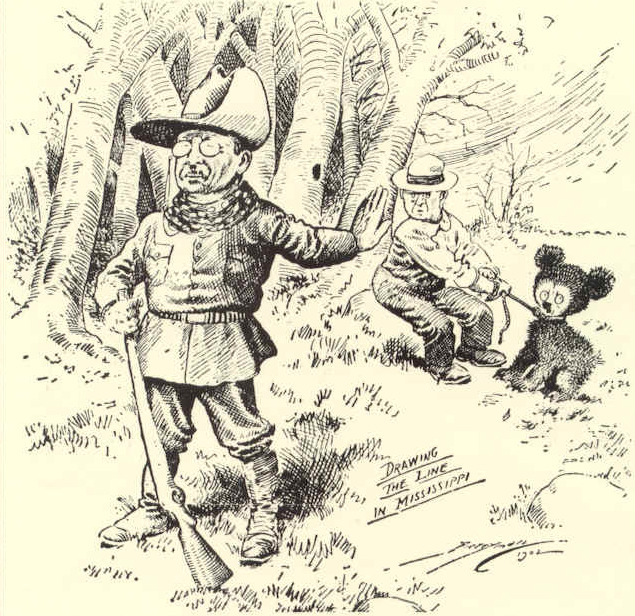
A 1902 political cartoon in The Washington Post spawned the teddy bear name.

Michtom was born into a Jewish family on September 12, 1869, and immigrated to New York in 1887, when he also married his wife, Rose Katz (1867–1937), who was born in Romania. He sold candy in his shop at 404 Tompkins Avenue in Bedford-Stuyvesant Brooklyn by day and made stuffed animals with his wife Rose at night.

The teddy bear was inspired by a cartoon by Pulitzer Prize-winning cartoonist Clifford K. Berryman depicting American president Theodore Roosevelt—commonly called "Teddy"—having compassion for a bear at the end of an unsuccessful hunting trip in Mississippi in 1902. Michtom saw the drawing and created a tiny plush bear cub which he sent to Roosevelt. Michtom put a plush bear in the shop window with a sign "Teddy's bear." After the creation of the bear in 1902, the sale of the bears was so brisk that in 1907 Michtom created the Ideal Novelty and Toy Company.

Michtom died in Brooklyn, New York on the July 21, 1938, at the age of 68.

== See also ==
- Margarete Steiff
