= Maialino! =

Single by misono

from the album Uchi
- Released: February 15, 2012
- Genre: J-pop, pop/rock
- Label: Avex Trax (Japan)

Misono singles chronology
"Hontouso/Sukirai" (2011)	"Maialino!" (2012)	"Itsumademo... Teddy Bear" (2012)

Alternative covers
- CD+DVD

Maialino! / 「...。」 no Tsuzuki ~Eien Nante Nai... Itsuka Owari ga Aru Keredo~ (マイアリーノ！／「...。」の続き ～永遠なんてない... いつか終わりがあるけれど～ / "...。"Continuation ~There is No Eternity... But There Will Be an End Someday~) is the second single by artist misono under the pseudonym "Me" and the second in her era post Me. The single charted at #61 on the Oricon weekly charts and remained on the charts for three weeks.

The single was a collaborative effort with Mono Comme Ça, a fashion brand throughout Japan.

== Background ==
Maialino! / 「...。」 no Tsuzuki ~Eien Nante Nai... Itsuka Owari ga Aru Keredo~ is the second single by Japanese artist misono under the pseudonym "Me," and eighteenth overall single. The single charted on the Oricon Singles Charts at #61 and remained on the charts for three consecutive weeks.

For the single, misono collaborated with fashion apparel designer and distributor Mono Comme Ça (MONO COMME ÇA). The cover art of the CD+DVD edition of the single featured the brand's Valentine's Day piglet mascot named Maialino, which was designed by Shinichi Hara, who has designed covers for Ayumi Hamasaki albums.

The single was released in both standard CD and in a CD+DVD combo. Both versions contained the a-sides with their respective instrumentals; however, despite being touted as a double a-side, only "Maialino!" contained a music video.

"Maialino!" was composed by AKIRASTAR, with lyrics written by Toshio-chan. AKIRASTAR had previously worked with misono for her song "Watashi Iro" and for the medley (track #1) on her album Cover Album. AKIRASTAR also composed the music for "「...。」 no Tsuzuki ~Eien Nante Nai... Itsuka Owari ga Arukedo~," while misono wrote the lyrics and performed the piece.

== Music video ==
The music video for "Maialino!" carried the story of the piglet named Maialino, who was wandering alone. They were found by a small child, who took them home to their elder - in the video, their elder appears to be a grandmother. Throughout the video, Maialino is shown love, affection and overall happiness.

On October 15, 2012, avex's official YouTube uploaded a short version of the music video.

== Track listing ==
CD
No.	Title	Lyrics	Music	Arranger(s)	Length
1.	"Maialino!" (マイアリーノ！)	Toshio-chan	misono	AKIRASTAR	7:12
2.	"「...。」no Tsuzuki ~Eien Nante Nai... Itsuka Owari ga Aru Keredo~" (「...。」の続き 〜永遠なんてない．．．いつか終わりがあるけれど〜)	misono	misono	AKIRASTAR	5:43
3.	"Maialino!" (Instrumental)		misono	AKRIASTAR	7:11
4.	"「...。」no Tsuzuki ~Eien Nante Nai... Itsuka Owari ga Aru Keredo~" (Instrumental)		misono	AKIRASTAR	5:43

DVD
No.	Title	Length
1.	"Maialino!" (Music Video)	7:18
Total length:		7:18
