= Uchi (Misono album) =

Uchi 家-ウチ

Studio album by misono
- Released: October 13, 2014
- Recorded: 2011–2014
- Genre: J-pop, pop/rock
- Label: avex AVCD-93026 (Japan, CD+DVD); AVCD-93027 (Japan, CD)

Misono chronology
symphony with misono Best (2013)	Uchi 家-ウチ (2014)

Singles from Uchi
- 1. "with you" Released: February 9, 2011; 2. "No you! No life! No...××?" Released: May 11, 2011; 3. "Ho•n•to•u•so / Su•ki•ra•i" Released: November 23, 2011; 4. "「…。」 no Tsuzuki ~Eien Nante Nai... Itsuka Owari ga Aru Keredo~" Released: February 15, 2012; 5. "Koitsuri Girl Ai Girl ~Fishing Boy~" Released: November 7, 2012

Uchi (家-ウチ / Home) is the fourth studio album released by Japanese artist misono. The album charted at #49 on the Oricon charts and remained on the charts for three weeks. The full title of the album is "Uchi: ※Album ga 1man-mai Urenakattara misono wa mou CD wo Hatsubai Suru Koto ga Dekimasen." (家-ウチ-※アルバムが1万枚売れなかったらmisonoはもうCDを発売することができません。; "Home: ※If This Album Can't Sell 10,000 Copies, misono Will No Longer be Able to Release CDs".) The album only sold 2,856 and misono has yet to release another single or album.

== Background information ==
Uchi is the fourth studio album by pop/rock soloist misono. The album debuted at #49 on the Oricon Albums Charts, but only stayed on the charts for three weeks. Due to misono's prior albums being met with low sales, a message was placed on all of the covers for the album, saying that if the album failed to sell more than 10,000 copies, misono would no longer be releasing music. The full title released was Uchi- ※Album ga 10,000 ure na kattara misono wa mou CD wo hatsubai suru koto ga dekimasen (アルバムが1万枚売れなかったらmisonoはもうCDを発売することができません / If we do not sell 10,000 albums, misono can't release another CD). Since the album's release, it has only sold 2,856 and misono has yet to release another single or album.

The album became misono's second album released under the pseudonym "Me," her first being her third studio album Me. Her first single for the album, "with you," was initially released as a collaboration with rock group Back-On. For the album, misono performed a solo version, omitting both Kenji03's and TEEDA's vocals. Along with "with you," the album had four other preluding singles, three released by misono: "Ho•n•to•u•so / Su•ki•ra•i", "「…。」 no Tsuzuki ~Eien Nante Nai... Itsuka Owari ga Aru Keredo~", "Koitsuri Girl Ai Girl ~Fishing Boy~", and a collaboration single released with Cocoa Otoko titled "No you! No life! No...××?".

Uchi was released in both CD and CD+DVD editions, with each edition containing a different set list of music. Although they did not come from a single, the album did feature two of the songs from misono's second extended play, symphony with misono Best: "Junction Punctuation Mark" and "61-byoume no... Fura Letter Saigo no Hatsukoi ~Copernicus Tekitenkai~." "Junction Punctuation Mark" was placed on the CD only edition of the album, while "61-byoume no... Fura Letter Saigo no Hatsukoi ~Copernicus Tekitenkai~" was placed on the CD+DVD edition of the album. Both of the music videos for the songs were, however, placed on the album's corresponding DVD.

== Track listing ==
=== CD only ===
All lyrics are written by misono.

CD
No.	Title	Length
1.	"Uchi! Uchi! Rock ~Toriatsukai Setsumeisho~" (ウチ！ウチ！ROCK～取り扱い説明書～)	5:36
2.	"Ho•n•to•u•so"	5:01
3.	"Junction Punctuation Mark"	3:59
4.	"with you" (Me ver.)	3:44
5.	"No you! No life! No...××?" (Me ver.)	4:50
6.	"Shiroku "Jikochuu" Kimi-jikan Ore Tokei ~Metronome no Douki Genshou~" (四六“時「己」中” キミ時間オレ時計～メトロノームの同期現象～)	3:40
7.	"「…。」 no Tsuzuki ~Eien Nante Nai... Itsuka Owari ga Aru Keredo~"	5:44
8.	"Second Season Girl Friend ~Onna Tomodachi? Imouto Teki Sonzai? Tada no Osananajimi? Renai Taishou? Tomodachi Ijou? Koibito Miman? 2 Banme Demo Nai? Suki Demo Kirai Demo Nai? Tsugou no Ii Onna Domari?~"	6:01
9.	"Tanabata☆Jita ButterFly♪"	4:09
10.	"Koi Tsuri Girl Ai Girl ~Fishing Boy~"	6:16
11.	"25-jikan ~Moshimo 1-nichi ga 24-jikan de wa Naku Ato 1-jikan Attara... Anata wa Dare ni Nani wo Shimasu ka?~" (25時間～もしも1日が24時間ではなくあと1時間あったら...あなたは誰に何をしますか？～)	4:54
12.	"Gan ti-bu×Hitori∞Ashi" (願ティ部×１人∞脚)	4:49
13.	"Shoutaijou♪Big-ri☆Yancha Hamechakucha★Omo-cha~Bako" (招待状♪BIGり☆ヤンチャはちゃめちゃくちゃ★オモちゃ～箱)	5:15
14.	"Futarijime Watashijime "Hanbun Zukko"" (ふたり占め わたし占め 「半分ずっこ」)	4:46
15.	"Su•ki•ra•i"	5:15

=== CD+DVD version ===
All lyrics are written by misono.

CD
No.	Title	Length
1.	"Uchi! Uchi! Rock ~Toriatsukai Setsumeisho~"	5:36
2.	"Ho•n•to•u•so"	5:01
3.	"Shiroku "Jikochuu" Kimi-jikan Ore Tokei ~Metronome no Douki Genshou~"	3:40
4.	"「...。」 no Tsuzuki ~Eien Nante Nai... Itsuka Owari ga Aru Keredo~"	5:44
5.	"Second season Girl Friend ~Onna Tomodachi? Imouto Teki Sonzai? Tada no Osananajimi? Renai Taishou? Tomodachi Ijou? Koibito Miman? 2 Banme Demo Nai? Suki Demo Kirai Demo Nai? Tsugou no Ii Onna Domari?~"	6:01
6.	"61-byoume no... Fura Letter Saigo no Hatsukoi ~Copernicus Tekitenkai~"	4:54
7.	"Kingyozukui ~Kimi wa Dono Princess?~" (金魚救い～君はどのプリンセス？～)	4:39
8.	"Tanabata☆Jita ButterFly♪"	4:09
9.	"Koitsuri Girl Ai Girl ~Fishing Boy~"	6:16
10.	"25-jikan ~Moshimo 1-nichi ga 24-jikan de wa Naku Ato 1-jikan Attara... Anata wa Dare ni Nani wo Shimasu ka?~"	4:54
11.	"Gan ti-bu×Hitori∞Ashi"	4:49
12.	"Shoutaijou♪Big-ri☆Yancha Hamechakucha★Omo-cha~Bako"	5:15
13.	"Futarijime Watashijime "Hanbun Zukko""	4:46
14.	"Su•ki•ra•i"	5:15

DVD
No.	Title	Length
1.	"Ho•n•to•u•so" (Music Video)	5:04
2.	"with you feat. Me" (Music Video)	3:59
3.	"「NO you! NO life! NO…xx ?」 feat. Me" (Music Video)	5:06
4.	"Koitsuri Girl Ai Girl ~Fishing Boy~" (Music Video)	6:22
5.	"Junction Punctuation Mark" (Music Video)	4:02
6.	"61-byoume no... Fura Letter Saigo no Hatsukoi ~Copernicus Tekitenkai~" (Music Video)	4:49
7.	"Uchi! Uchi! Rock ~Toriatsukai Setsumeisho~" (Music Video)	4:09
8.	"Uchi! Uchi! Rock ~Toriatsukai Setsumeisho~" (Choreography Video)

== Charts (Japan) ==
Release	Chart	Peak position	Chart run	Total sales
October 13, 2014	Oricon Albums Chart	49	3 weeks	2,856
