= Teddy Bear Museum of Naples =

Defunct museum in Collier County, Florida

- Established: December 1990
- Dissolved: May 31, 2005
- Location: 2511 Pine Ridge Road; Naples, Florida
- Coordinates: 26°12′44″N 81°46′00″W
- Type: Teddy bear
- Collection size: 5,500 teddy bears
- Director: George Black
- Owner: Frances Hayes
- Website: teddymuseum.com

The Teddy Bear Museum of Naples was a visitor attraction located in north Naples, Florida, United States. It opened in December 1990 and closed in May 2005. It operated as a non-profit organization, received funding from donations, as well as profit from museum tickets, gift shop sales, and Hug Club membership.

== History ==
The museum started when Frances Pew Hayes received a small M&M's teddy bear from a grandchild. After this, she started collecting teddy bears and people bought opened the museum six years later, in 1990. The collection expanded to around 5,500 individual bears until the museum closed. Many of the bears were donated from private collectors. In the late 1990s, the Museum was sold to North Collier Hospital, and the hospital planned to relocate the museum to a new location as part of a new children's hospital. The plan fell through, and the museum was again separated.

In 2005, a year after Hayes died, the museum director and Hayes' son, George Black, announced that the museum would be closed and all of the exhibits would be sold off. Reasons included rising operating costs, a lack of volunteers, and flat admission numbers.

In 2007, Greater Naples YMCA bought the museum for $2.25 million, equivalent to $3.49 million in 2025, for plans to use it as an early childhood development center.

== The museum ==
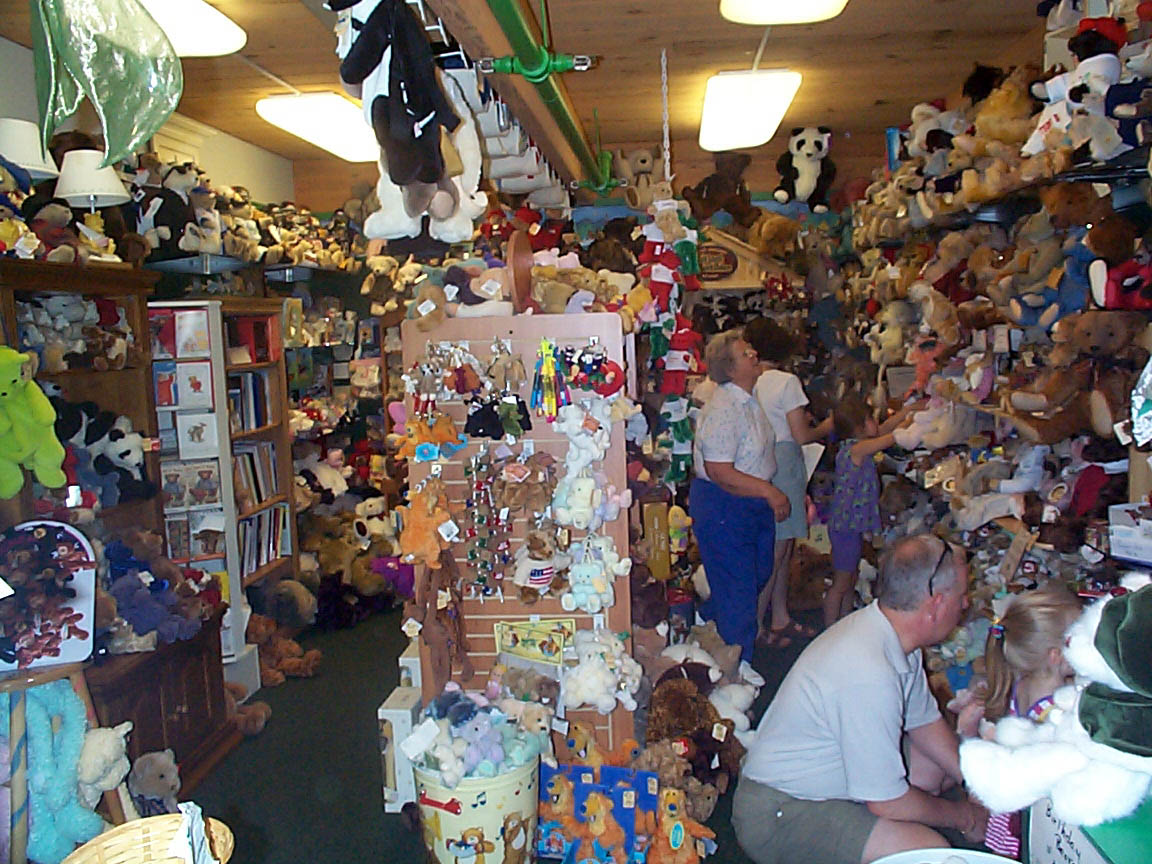
Inside the gift store.

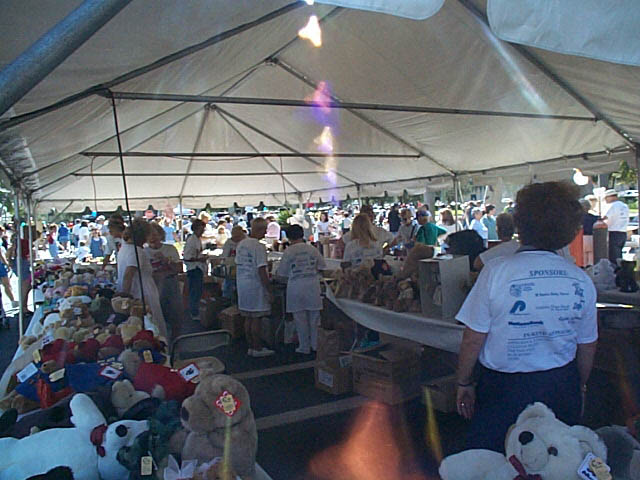
The Teddy Bear Fair in 1999.

The main museum building itself was a circular-shaped building with a central atrium. An auxiliary building contained a small gift shop. The museum contained various exhibits, such as a Teddy Bears' Picnic, a parade, a wedding ceremony, a "beard of directors", and collections from around the world.

== Teddy Bear Fair ==
One of the annual events held by the Museum was the Teddy Bear Fair. It was usually held in October and consisted of various activities, such as games, performances by bands and groups, and petting zoos. The fair was initially located at Cambier Park in Naples, but during the North Collier Hospital ownership, the fair was held at the hospital.
