= Teddy bear museum =

Institution preserving teddy bear collections

Teddy Bear Museum
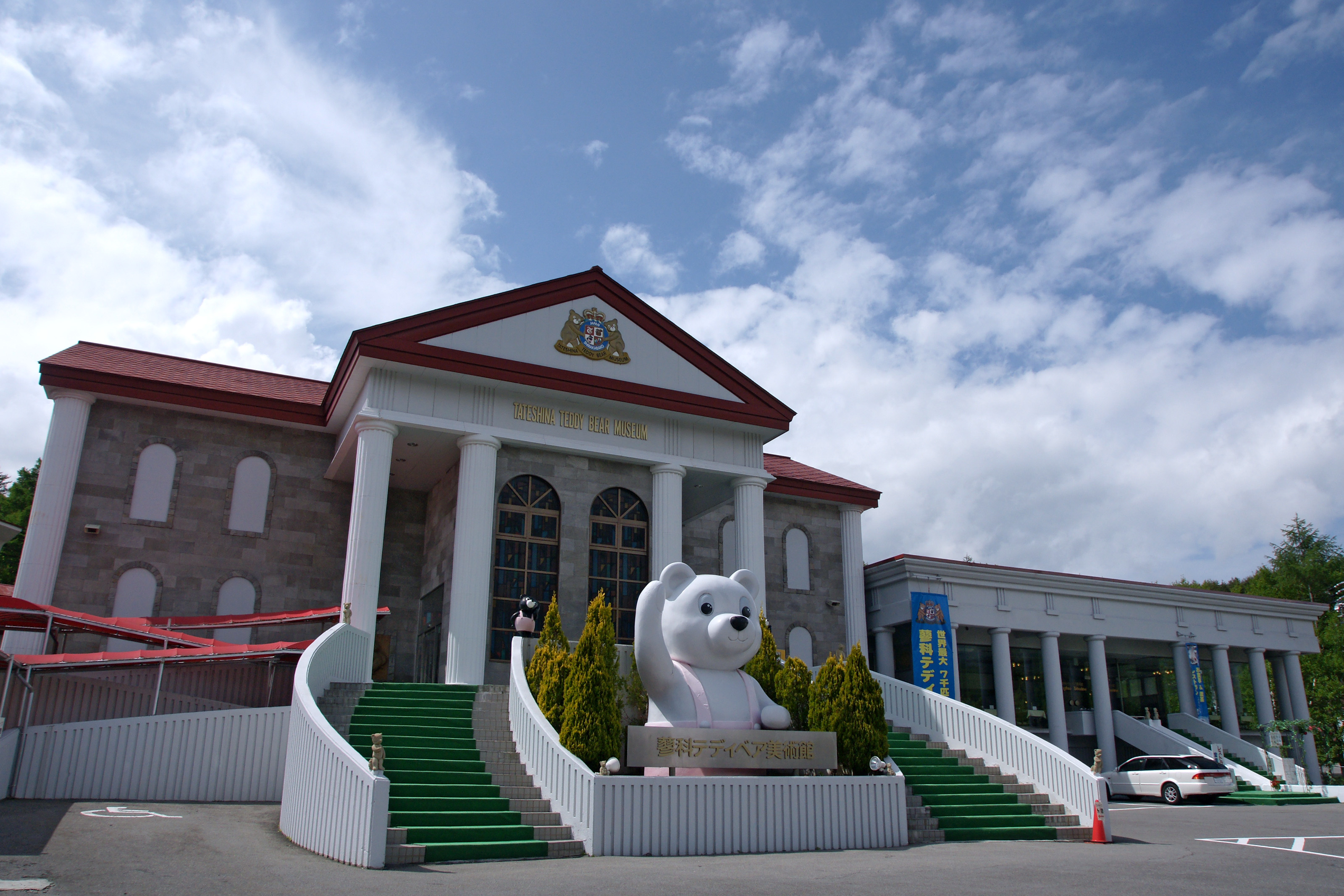
- Tateshina Teddy Bear Museum, Tateshina, Nagano, Japan
- Established: 1984
- Location: Worldwide
- Type: Teddy bear museum
- Collection size: Teddy bears and related items
- Founder: Judy Sparrow (First Teddy Bear Museum)

A teddy bear museum is a museum about teddy bears. There are many teddy bear museums around the world.

The world's first Teddy Bear Museum was based in Petersfield, Hampshire, England. It was founded by Judy Sparrow in 1984, and housed a collection of antique teddy bears and related items. It closed in 2006.

The British broadcaster Gyles Brandreth founded a Teddy Bear Museum in Stratford-upon-Avon. After 18 years it was relocated to the Polka Theatre in Wimbledon, London and then, in 2016, relocated again to Newby Hall, near Ripon, in North Yorkshire.

The V&A Museum of Childhood in Bethnal Green also has an extensive range of teddy bears.

The Jeju Teddy bear museum in South Korea has many kinds of teddy bears from various countries.

The Izu Teddy Bear Museum opened in Itō, Shizuoka, Japan in 1995. It has a collection of various teddy bears, including "Teddy Girl".

== Other notable museums ==
- Dorset Teddy Bear Museum, Dorchester, England
- The Merrythought Teddy Bear Shop & Museum, Shropshire, England
- The Den of Marbletown, Teddy Bear Museum, Kingston, New York, U.S.
- Deutsches Teddybären Museum (German Teddy Bear Museum)
- Teddy Bear Museum Pattaya, Thailand
- TeddyVille Museum, Georgetown, Penang, Malaysia -opened 2016
- Teseum, Teddy Bear Safari Theme Park, Jeju Island, South Korea
- Nasu Teddy Bear Museum, Japan
- Hida Takayama Teddy Bear Eco Village, Takayama, Japan
- Izu Teddy Bear Museum, Itō, Shizuoka Prefecture, Japan
- My lovely Bear Teddy Museum, Yaroslavl, Russia

=== Defunct ===
- Teddy Bear Museum at N Seoul Tower, South Korea - opened in 2008
- Teddy Bear Museum of Naples, Florida, USA — operated from 1990 to 2005
