= Teddy bear =

Soft toy in the form of a bear

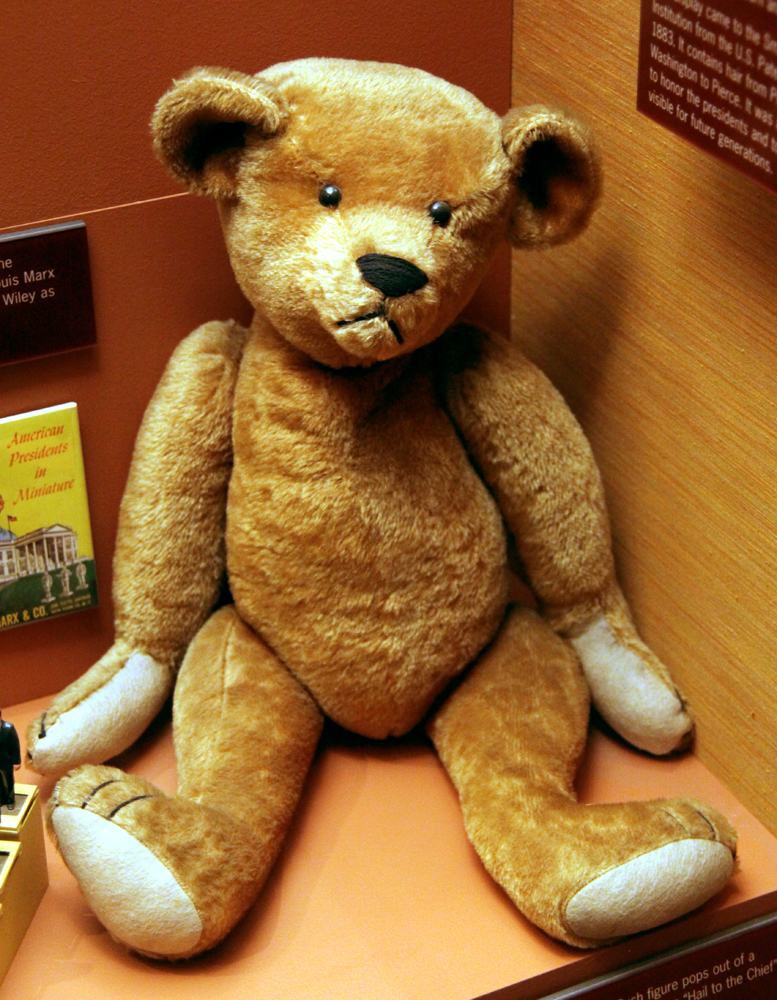
Bear thought to be made by Morris Michtom in the early 1900s; donated to the Smithsonian Museum of Natural History in Washington, D.C., United States, by Theodore Roosevelt's grandson Kermit Roosevelt Jr. in 1964

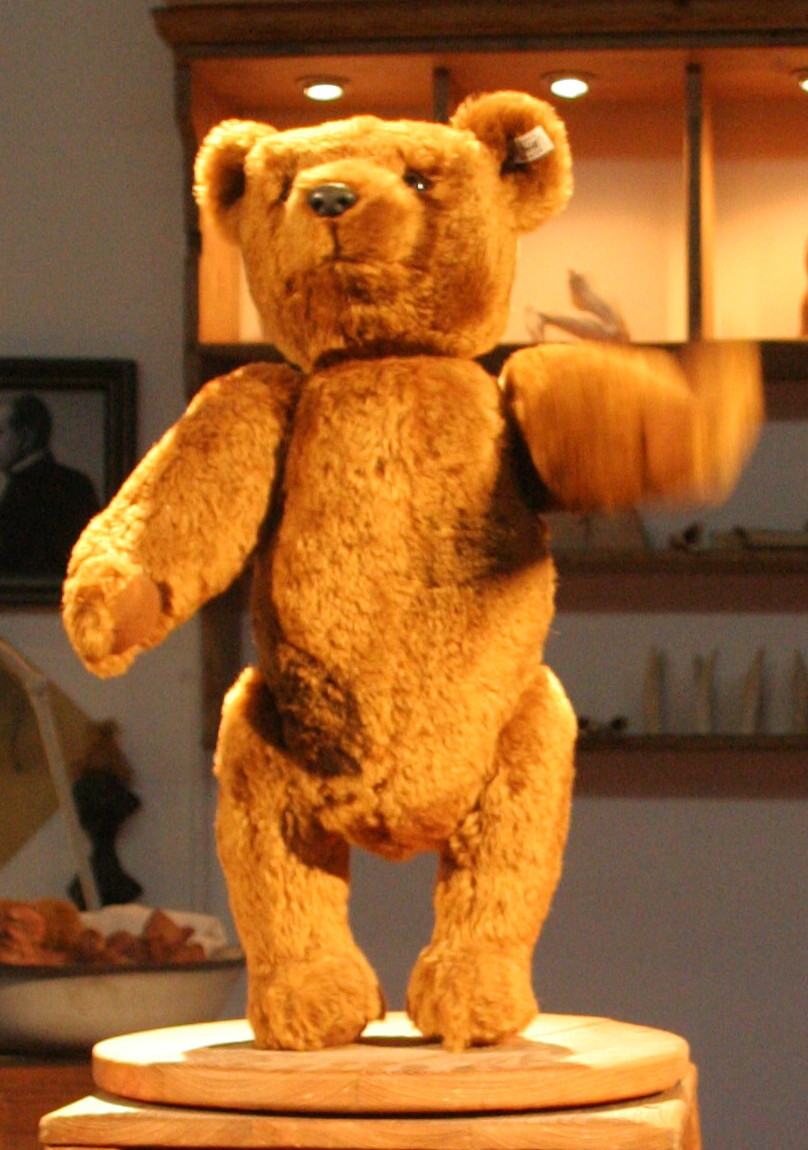
A replica Steiff model 55PB displayed at the Steiff-Museum, Giengen, Germany, in 2006; no original examples of the 55PB are known to survive

A teddy bear, or simply a teddy, is a stuffed toy in the form of a bear. The teddy bear was named by Morris Michtom after the 26th president of the United States, Theodore Roosevelt; it was developed apparently simultaneously in the first decade of the 20th century by two toymakers: Richard Steiff in Germany and Michtom in the United States. It became a popular children's toy, and it has been celebrated in story, song, and film.

Since the creation of the first teddy bears (which sought to imitate the form of real bear cubs), "teddies" have greatly varied in form, style, color, and material. They have become collector's items, with older and rarer teddies appearing at public auctions. Teddy bears are among the most popular gifts for children, and they are often given to adults to signify affection, congratulations, or sympathy.

== History ==
=== "Teddy's bear" ===
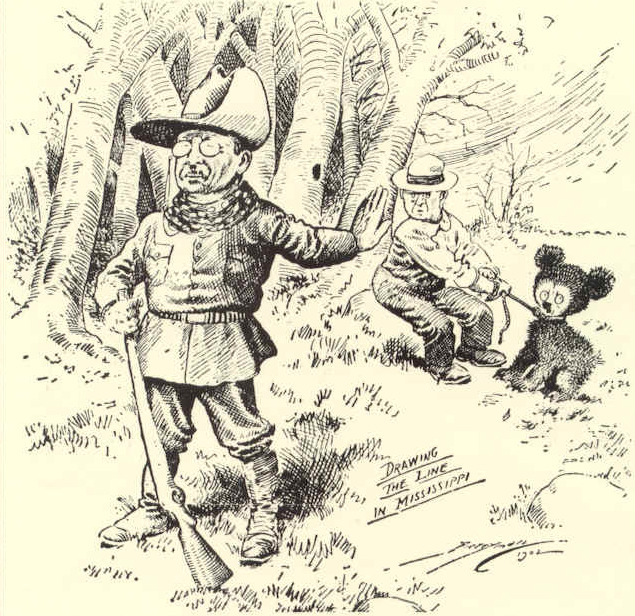
A 1902 political cartoon in The Washington Post spawned the teddy bear name.

The name teddy bear comes from Theodore Roosevelt, the 26th president of the United States, who was often referred to as "Teddy" (a nickname he loathed). The name originated from an incident on a bear-hunting trip in the U.S. state of Mississippi in November 1902, to which Roosevelt was invited by Andrew H. Longino, the 35th governor of Mississippi. There were several other hunters competing, including LeRoy Percy, and most of them had already killed an animal. A party of Roosevelt's attendants, led by freedman Holt Collier, cornered, clubbed, and tied an American black bear to a willow tree after a long and exhausting chase with hounds. They called Roosevelt to the site and suggested that he should shoot the bear dead, although Collier told Roosevelt not to shoot the bear while it was tied. Roosevelt refused to shoot the bear himself, deeming this unsportsmanlike, but instructed that the bear be killed to put it out of its misery, and it became the topic of a political cartoon by Clifford Berryman in The Washington Post on November 16, 1902. While the initial cartoon depicted an adult black bear lassoed by a handler and a disgusted Roosevelt, later issues of that and other Berryman cartoons made the bear smaller and cuter.

Morris Michtom saw the Berryman drawing of Roosevelt and was inspired to create a teddy bear. He created a small soft bear cub and put it in his candy-shop window at 404 Tompkins Avenue in New York City with a sign reading "Teddy's bear". The toys were an immediate success and Michtom founded the Ideal Novelty and Toy Co.

The US writer Seymour Eaton wrote the children's book series The Roosevelt Bears, while the American composer John W. Bratton wrote an instrumental "The Teddy Bears' Picnic", a "characteristic two-step", in 1907, which later had words written to it by the Irish lyricist Jimmy Kennedy in 1932.

=== Steiff 55 PB ===
A little earlier in 1902 in Germany, the Steiff firm produced a stuffed bear from Richard Steiff's designs. Steiff exhibited the toy at the Leipzig Toy Fair in March 1903, where it was seen by Hermann Berg, a buyer for George Borgfeldt & Company in New York (and the brother of the composer Alban Berg). He ordered 3,000 to be sent to the United States. Although Steiff's records show that the bears were produced, they are not recorded as arriving in the U.S., and no example of the type, "55 PB", has ever been seen, leading to the story that the bears were shipwrecked. However, the shipwreck story is disputed – the author Günther Pfeiffer notes that it was only recorded in 1953 and says it is more likely that the 55 PB was not sufficiently durable to survive until the present day. Although Steiff and Michtom were both making teddy bears at around the same time, neither would have known of the other's creation due to poor transatlantic communication.

=== Development ===
Early teddy bears were made to look like real bears, with extended snouts and beady eyes. Modern teddy bears are generally distinguished by larger eyes and foreheads and smaller noses, baby-like features intended to enhance the toy's cuteness. Some teddy bears are also designed to represent different species, such as polar bears and brown bears, as well as pandas and koalas. While early teddy bears were covered in tawny mohair fur, modern teddy bears are manufactured in a wide variety of commercially available fabrics, most commonly synthetic fur, but also velour, denim, cotton, satin, and canvas.

A woman (seated with three men and a chimpanzee) carries a teddy bear in the early 20th century

== Production ==
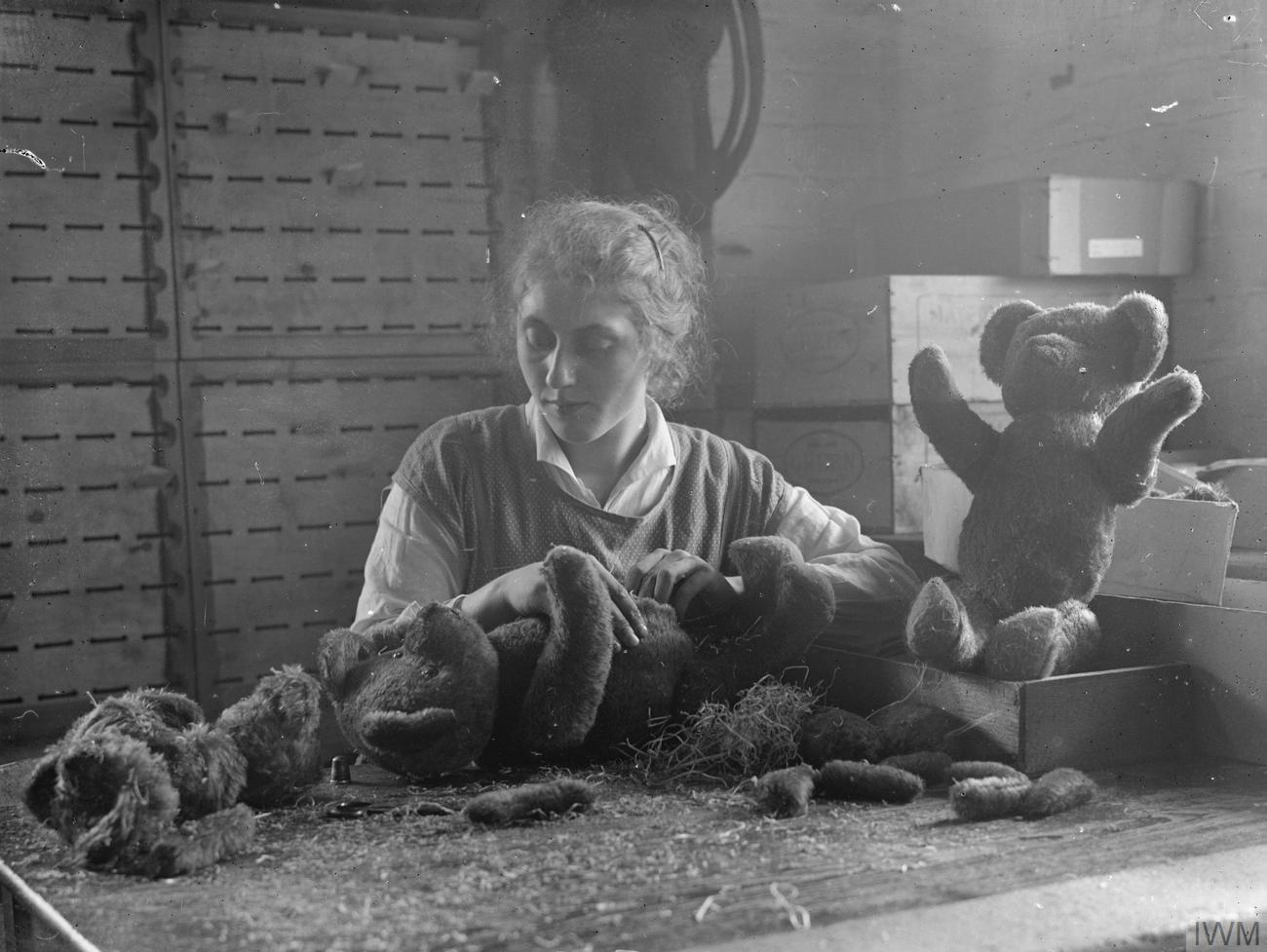
A worker stuffing a teddy bear in a toy factory, 1917

=== Commercial ===
Commercially made, mass-produced teddy bears are predominantly made as toys for children. These bears either have safety joints for attaching arms, legs, and heads, or else the joints are sewn and not articulated. They must have securely fastened eyes that do not pose a choking hazard for small children. These "plush" bears must meet a rigid standard of construction in order to be marketed to children in the United States and in the European Union. The Vermont Teddy Bear Company in the U.S. is one of the world's largest specialty marketers of teddy bears.

There are also companies, like Steiff, that sell handmade collectible bears that can be purchased in stores or over the Internet. The majority of teddy bears are manufactured in countries with low production costs, such as China and Indonesia. A few small, single-person producers in the United States make unique, non-mass-produced teddy bears. In the United Kingdom one small, traditional teddy bear company remains, Merrythought, which was established in 1930. Mohair, the fur shorn or combed from a breed of long haired goats, is woven into cloth, dyed and trimmed.

Making of a teddy bear

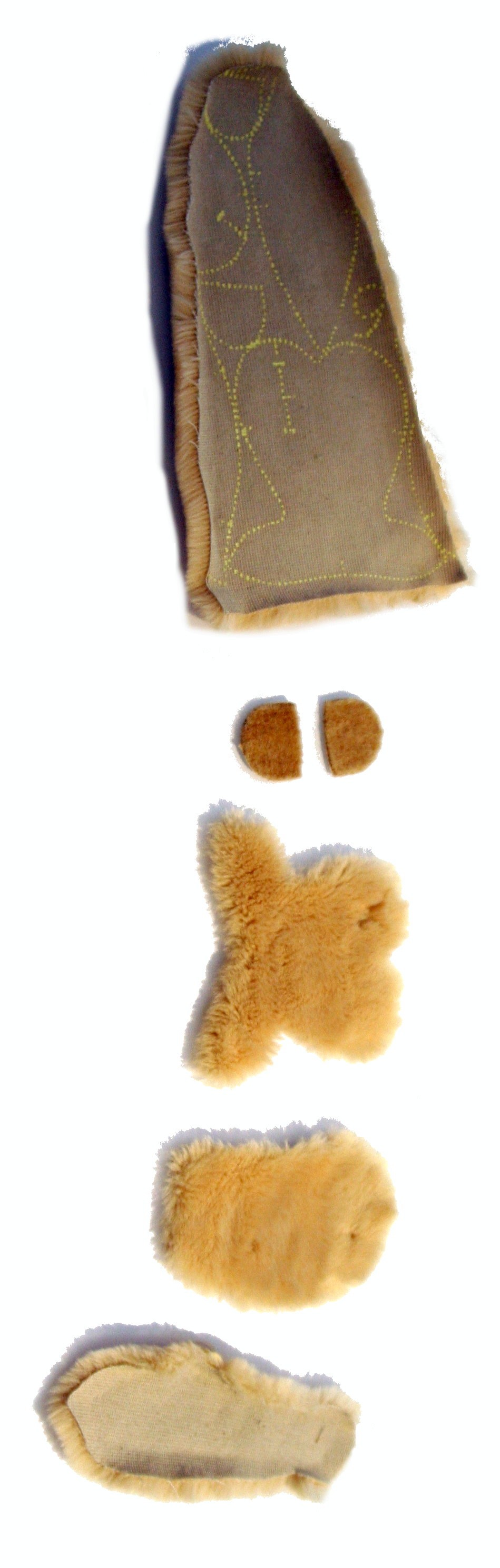
1: Cutting

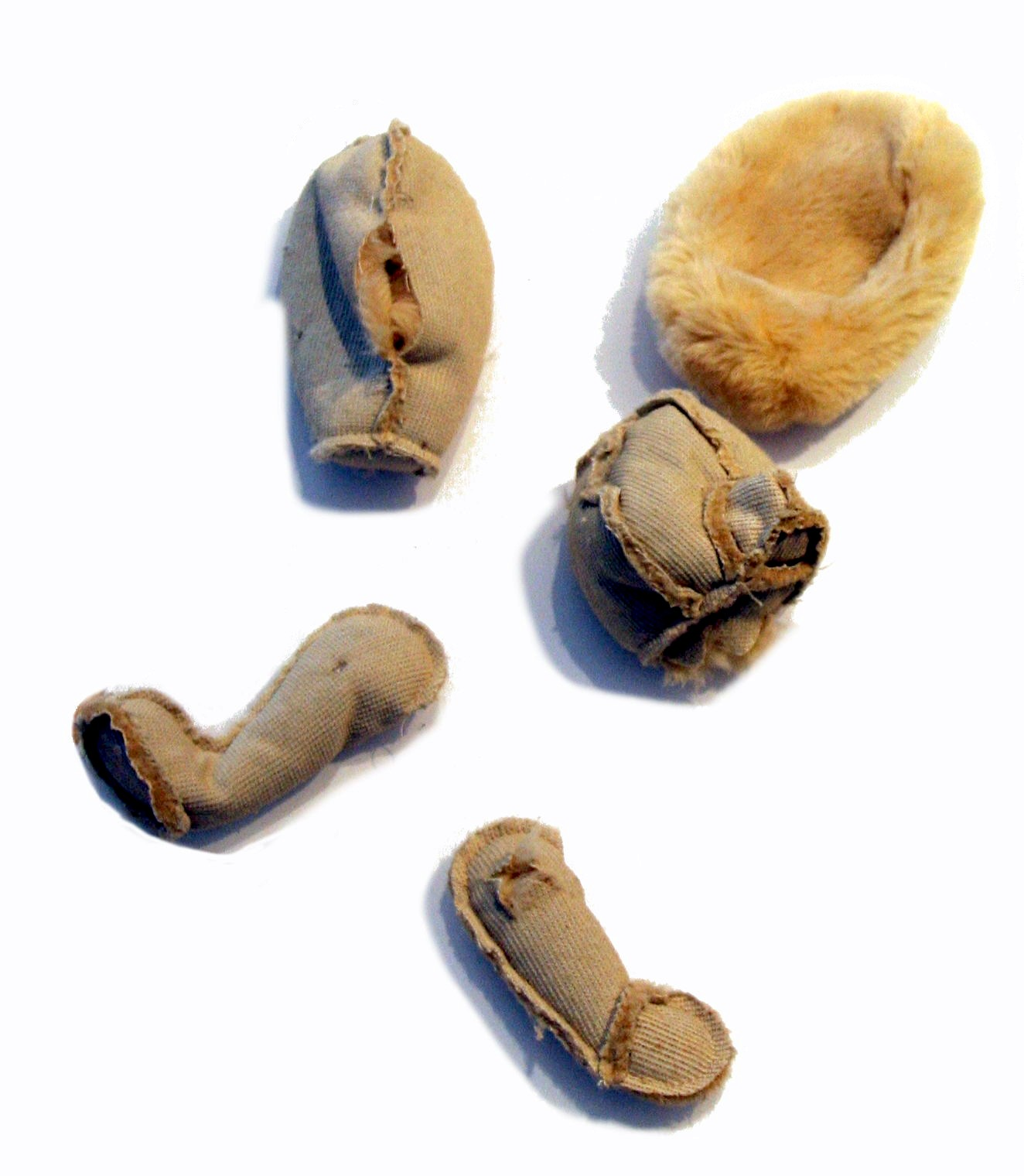
2: Sewing and turning

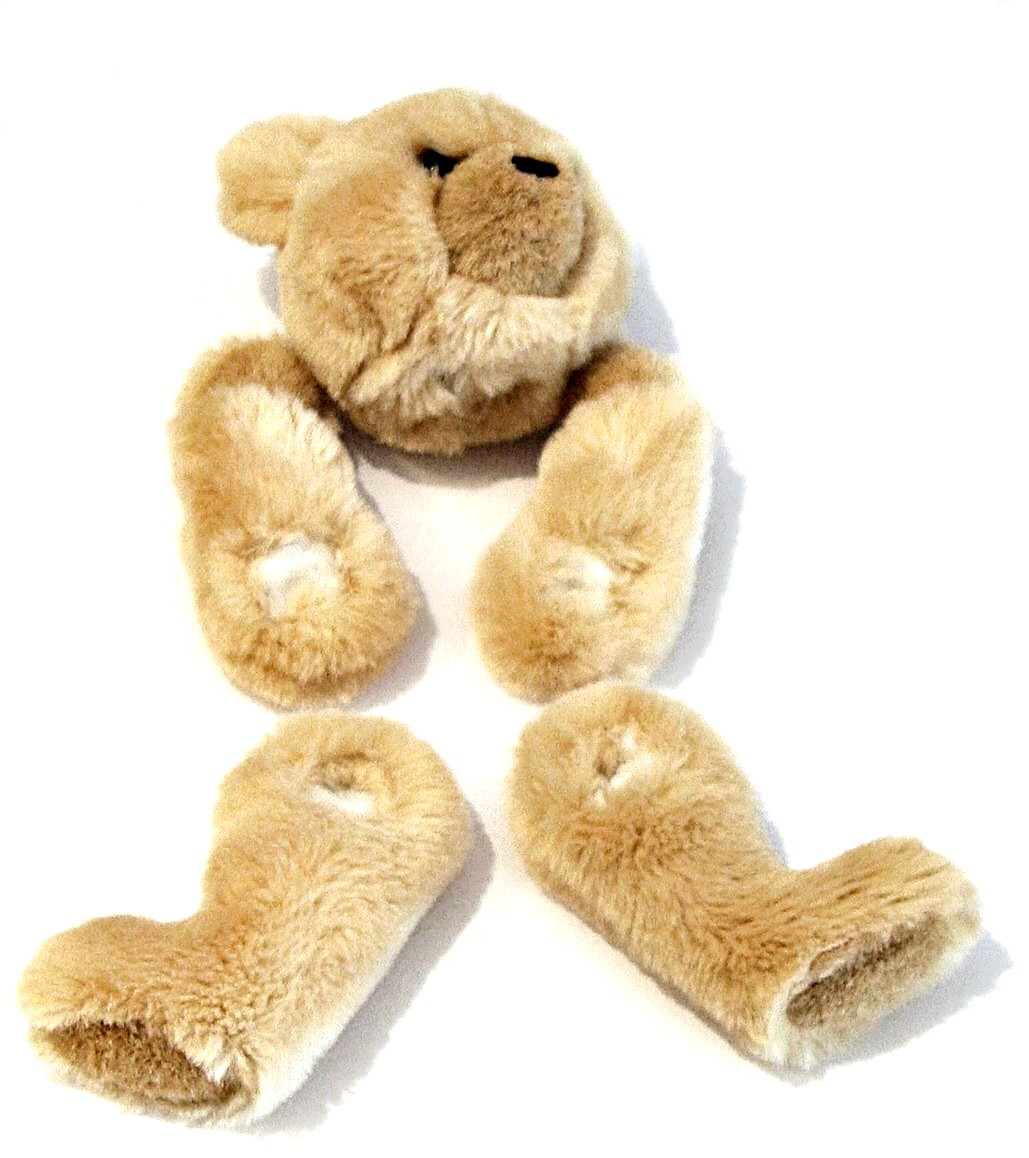
3: Filling

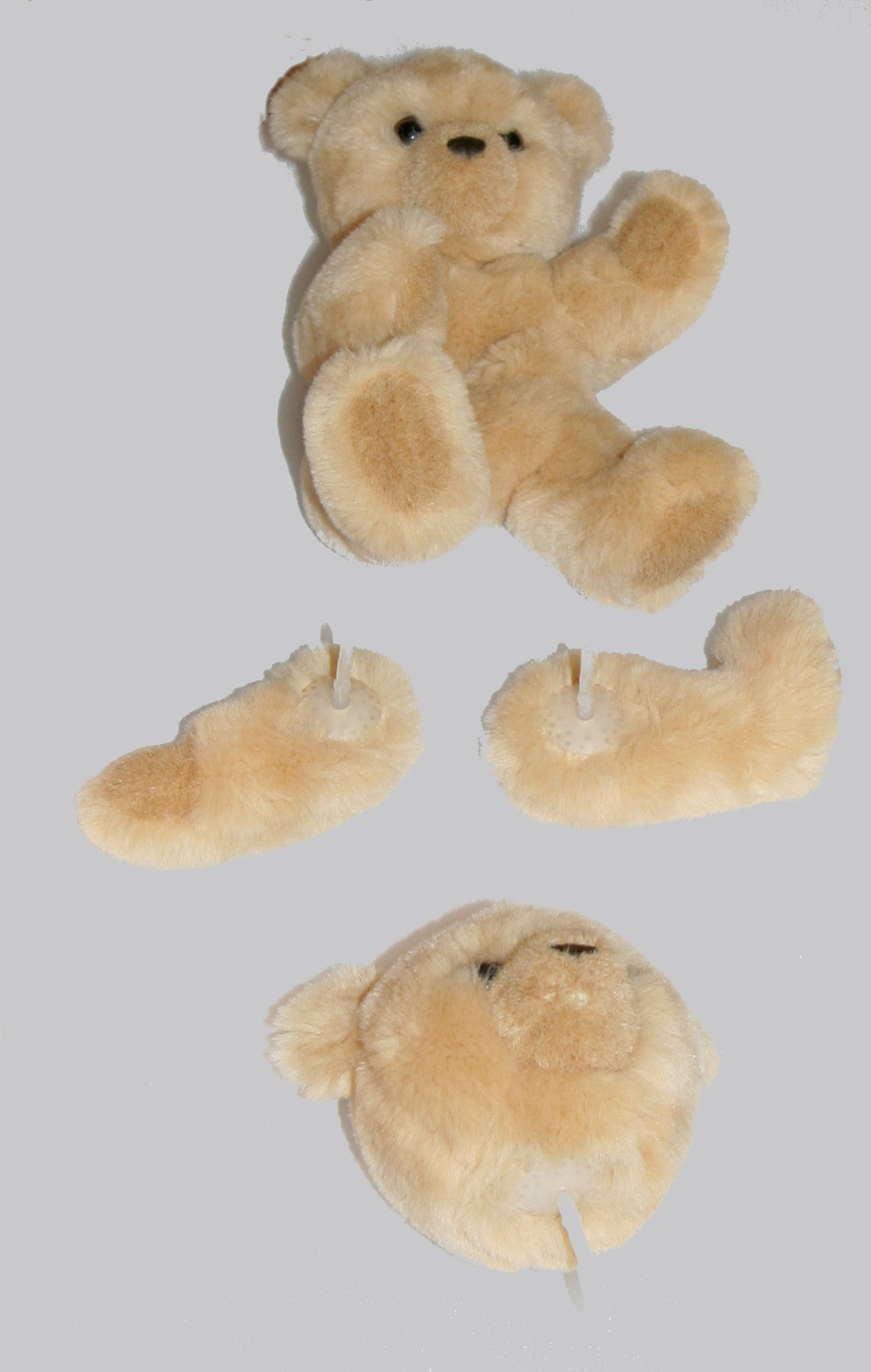
4: Assembling

=== Amateur ===
Teddy bears are a favourite form of soft toy for amateur toy makers, with many patterns commercially produced or available online. Many "teddies" are home-made as gifts or for charity, while "teddy bear artists" often create "teddies" for retail, decorating them individually with commercial and recycled ornaments such as sequins, beads and ribbons. Sewn teddy bears are made from a wide range of materials including felt, cotton and velour. While many are stitched, others are made from yarn, either knitted or crocheted.

== Cultural impact ==
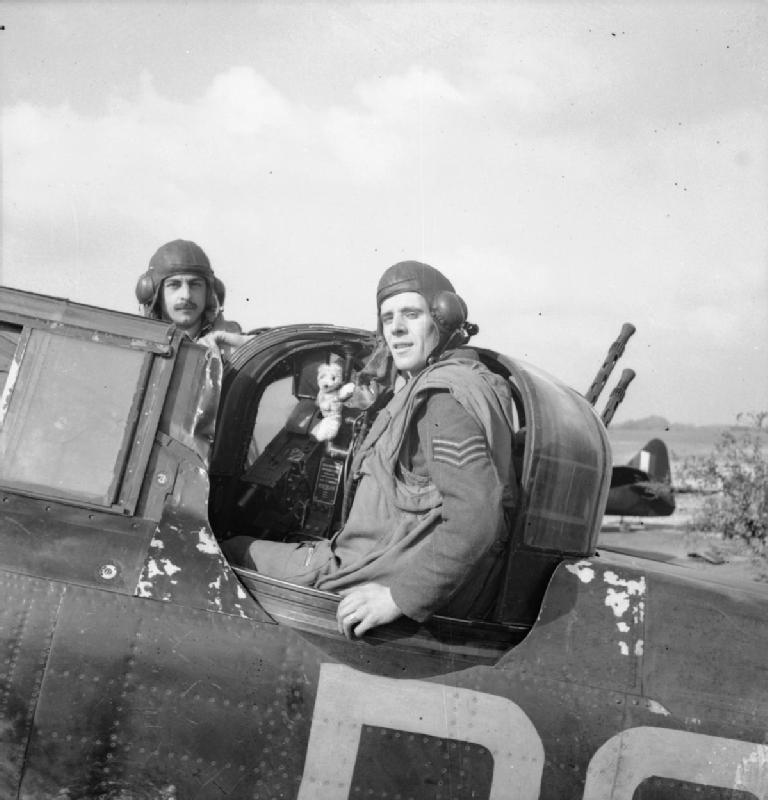
An RAF Boulton Paul Defiant crew with their teddy bear mascot at RAF Biggin Hill during World War II

Retail sales of stuffed plush animals including teddy bears totaled US$1.3 billion in 2006, with manufacturers including Gund and Ty Inc.

Teddy bear plush toys have enjoyed ongoing popularity, complete with specialty retailers such as Teddy Atelier Stursberg and Vermont Teddy Bear Company, as well as do-it-yourself chains including Build-A-Bear Workshop. Those who are fond of or collect teddy bears are called arctophiles.

=== Moral panic ===
Headline published in the Telegram & Gazette on July 8, 1907

In 1907, Michael G. Esper, a Catholic priest in St. Joseph, Michigan, declared in a sermon that teddy bears were "horrible monstrosities", which by supplanting the "good old dolls" would cause girls to lose the urge to nurture babies, leading to declining birth rates among the white population and race suicide. He called them "nothing more than a bundle of horridness" and "libel to the bear tribe", and said, "What is more disgusting that to see a child of tender years fondling and caressing and even kissing these pseudo animals?"

The suggestion attracted widespread but short-lived attention. President Theodore Roosevelt said he had read the sermon with interest but declined to comment on the matter.

=== Museums ===
The world's first teddy bear museum was set up in Petersfield, Hampshire, England, in 1984. In 1990, a similar foundation was set up in Naples, Florida, United States. These were closed in 2006 and 2005, respectively, and the bears were sold in auctions, but there are many teddy bear museums around the world today.

=== Emergency services ===
Because police, fire and medical officials found that giving a teddy bear to a child during a crisis stabilized and calmed them, NAPLC created the Teddy Bear Cops program to distribute teddy bears to police, fire, and medical responders throughout the United States.

=== April Fools' Day ===
On April Fools' Day 1972, issue 90 of The Veterinary Record published a paper on the diseases of Brunus edwardii detailing common afflictions of teddy bears.

=== World's largest teddy bear ===
The largest teddy bear measures 19.41 m (63 ft 8 in) in length and was constructed by Municipio de Xonacatlán, Ideas por México and Agrupación de Productores de Peluche (all Mexico), in Estado de México, on 28 April 2019. The bear was displayed at the local stadium in the city of Xonacatlán, and was made with the same materials as a commercially available teddy bear, including details such as a tiara, dress, eyes, and nose. The bear was dubbed Xonita, after the town.

=== Billy Possum ===
The Billy Possum was a plush toy created after William Howard Taft won the 1908 United States presidential election. The toy was a stuffed possum, made to replace the teddy bear. The possum was chosen because of Taft's love for "possum and taters", and as a symbol of southern pride. Toy companies making them advertised using slogans predicting the end of teddy bear popularity. Those around Taft theorized that he would be remembered in a similar way as Roosevelt with a popular toy. However, the Billy Possum plush toy didn't achieve the same level of popularity or enduring legacy, and the toy's production and impact were minimal in comparison.

=== In popular culture ===
- The original toy inspired John Walter Bratton to compose the melody to "Teddy Bears' Picnic" in 1907, with lyrics by Jimmy Kennedy added in 1932.
- Rupert Bear comic has appeared in Daily Express since November 1920.
- Winnie-the-Pooh is based on a teddy bear owned by Christopher Robin Milne, the son of the author A. A. Milne; the character first appeared in a 1926 children's book and has been adapted by Disney for animated shorts since 1966.
- The Tubby Bear family from Enid Blyton's Noddy series, consisting of Mr. and Mrs. Tubby Bear, their son Master Tubby Bear, and their niece Tessie Bear.
- Sooty began broadcasting on British television in 1955.
- "(Let Me Be Your) Teddy Bear" was a number one hit for Elvis Presley in 1957.
- Paddington Bear is based on a teddy bear purchased by the British author Michael Bond, first appearing in a 1958 children's book.
- Rilakkuma is a teddy bear which debuted in Japan in 2003.
- Corduroy is a 1968 children's book based on an anthropomorphic teddy bear in a department store.
- SuperTed is a superhero teddy bear in an animated television series first airing in 1982.
- Care Bears were first produced as colorful plush teddy bears in 1983.
- Pudsey Bear has been the mascot for Children in Need since 1985.
- Teddy Ruxpin was the best-selling toy of 1985 and 1986.
- Teddy is a knitted toy oddity in the 1990s sitcom Mr. Bean.
- Misery Bear was featured in a series of fourteen shorts for the BBC website between 2009 and 2012.
- Naughty Bear (2010), and its 2012 sequel Naughty Bear: Panic in Paradise, are video games based on an anthropomorphic teddy bear who seeks revenge on the other bears that ostracised him.
- Ted bases its adult comedy on a teddy bear come to life.
- Teddy is a 2021 Tamil-language fantasy action film.
- Imaginary is a 2024 film produced by Blumhouse Productions and directed by Jeff Wadlow. The movie revolves around a supernatural teddy bear that befriends a child.
- National Teddy Bear Day - September 9th, a day to celebrate teddy bears
