= Richard Steiff =

German toy inventor (1877–1939)

- Born: 7 February 1877; Giengen, German Empire
- Died: 30 March 1939 (aged 62); Jackson, Michigan, United States
- Occupations: Designer and inventor

Richard Steiff (7 February 1877 – 30 March 1939) was a German designer known for creating one of the first teddy bears. In 1897, he joined Steiff, a stuffed toy company founded in his hometown Giengen by his aunt Margarete Steiff, and became integral to its growth as a global toy company.

== Early life ==
Steiff was born in Giengen, Germany. While attending the School of Arts and Crafts (Kunstgewerbeschule) in Stuttgart, he would regularly visit the nearby zoo and spend much of his time drawing the bears of an enclosure. He served in the German Army during World War I. He married Elsa Emma, née Dehlinger and had a daughter, Marianne Steiff.

== Career with Steiff ==
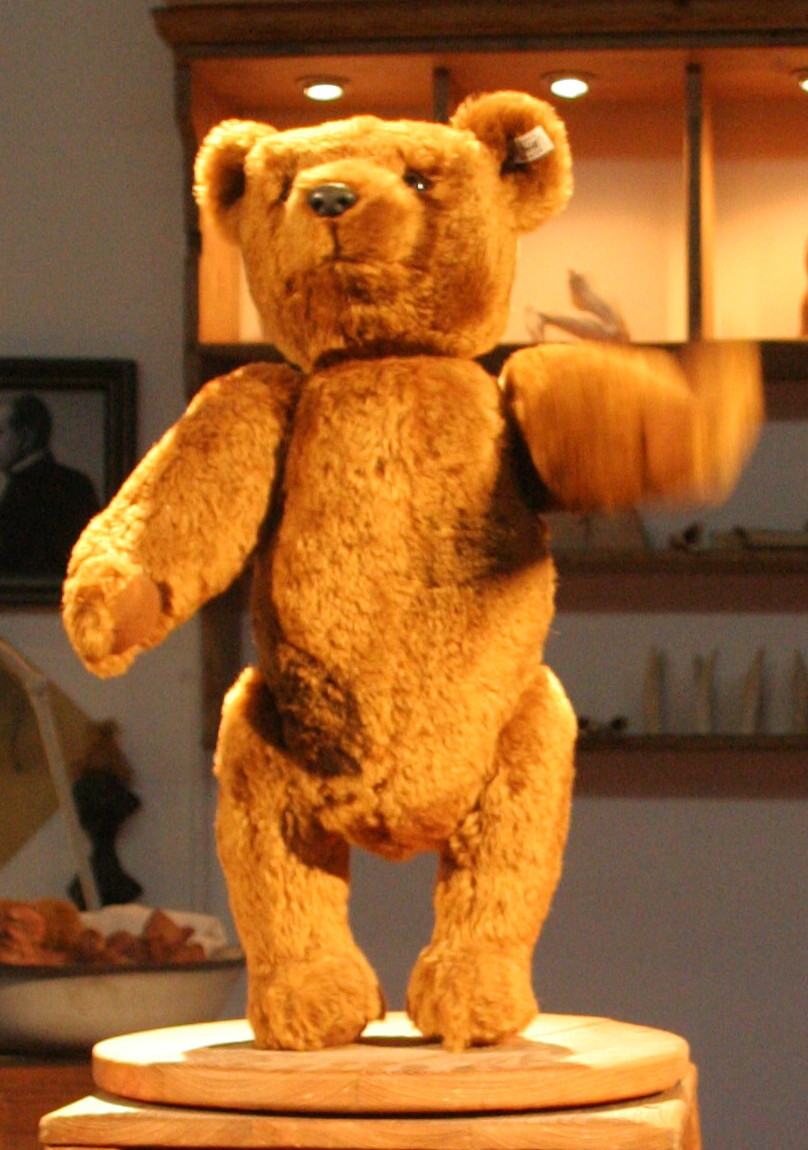
Replica of Steiff Bär 55 PB, Steiff-Museum Giengen

Steiff began working in his aunt Margarete's toymaking enterprise in 1897. Steiff's sketches of the bears at the local zoo were incorporated into the prototype of the toy bear he created in 1902 and codenamed Steiff Bär 55 PB (where 55 = the bear's height in centimeters; P = Plüsch, plush; and B = beweglich, moveable limbs), or more commonly known as the "55 PB". The 55 PB is regarded as one of the world's first teddy bears ever created. Stuffed bears similar to the one they created acquired the appellation "teddy" from a famous cartoon depicting Theodore "Teddy" Roosevelt and a cub in The Washington Post in 1902. Steiff also designed other animals for the company.

At the Leipzig Toy Fair in 1903, after initial difficulties attracting buyers, the 55 PB's fortunes were saved when an American buyer snapped up the entire lot of 100 available teddy bears and ordered another 3,000 just before the exhibition finished. To date there is not a single example that has survived.

At the St. Louis World's Fair in 1904, the Steiffs sold 12,000 bears and received the Gold Medal, which was the highest honor at the event. By 1907, Steiff was making 974,000 bears. He became the largest stockholder of the company following the death of his aunt in 1909. Vintage Steiff bears can now be quite valuable.

== Roloplan and other innovations ==
Steiff also attained several technological milestones. He developed the Roloplan, a type of kite that could take aerial photographs of the Steiff factory and its surroundings in Giengen. The Imperial German Army made use of the Roloplan for aerial reconnaissance, photography, and meteorology.

In 1903, Steiff planned and erected in Giengen a factory building of concrete and steel called the Jungfrauenaquarium (Virgins' Aquarium) that allowed the workers inside to enjoy ample natural light, a first for its time. He equipped the building with a ramp so that his aunt could reach the upper levels of the factory in her wheelchair.

== Later in life ==
In 1923, Richard boarded the SS President Arthur bound for New York City, and arrived on March 20, 1923. He signed a Declaration of Intention to become a United States citizen.

Steiff settled in Jackson, Michigan, where he lived with his wife and daughter. Steiff died in 1939 of a heart attack at the age of 62 in Jackson, where he spent the last 16 years of his life.

== See also ==
- Stuffed toy
- Morris Michtom

== Additional resources ==
- Pfeiffer, Günther. 125 Jahre Steiff Firmengeschichte - Die Margarethe Steiff GmbH. Königswinter: Heel Verlag GmbH, 2005. ISBN 3-89880-387-2.
