= Margarete Steiff =

Foundress of Margarete Steiff GmbH in Germany

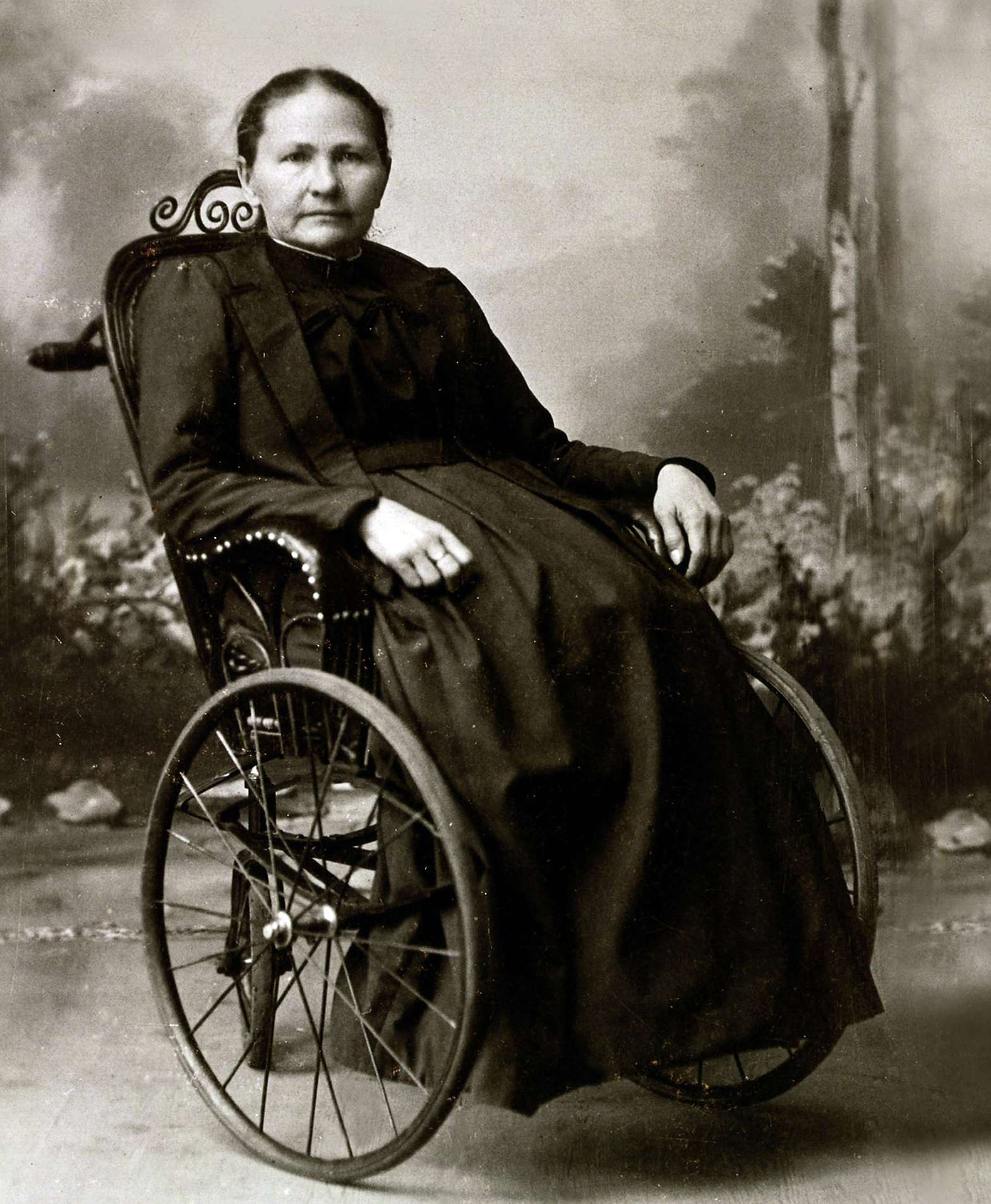
- Steiff
- Born: 24 July 1847; Giengen, Kingdom of Württemberg, German Confederation
- Died: 9 May 1909 (aged 61)
- Occupation: Founder of Margarete Steiff GmbH

Margarete Steiff (24 July 1847 – 9 May 1909) was a German seamstress who in 1880 founded Margarete Steiff GmbH, more widely known as Steiff, a maker of toy stuffed animals.

Born in Giengen, Kingdom of Württemberg, Margarete contracted polio as a child, leaving her with both legs paralyzed and pain in her right arm. After training as a seamstress, she was able to raise enough money to purchase a sewing machine by teaching people to play the zither. She began making clothes, eventually opening her own store in 1877. Around this time, Margarete came across a sewing pattern for a toy elephant, as well as patterns for mice and rabbits. Using felt and lambswool, Margarete made many of these toys as gifts for friends, and later began to sell some. Proving popular, the scale of production steadily increased, as did the variety of toys. In 1902, the company began making a toy bear with moveable joints based on a design by her nephew, Richard Steiff. Taking off in the United States, it was nicknamed after then-U.S. president Theodore Roosevelt, becoming the first "teddy bear".

== Childhood ==
Margarete was the daughter of building contractor Friedrich Steiff and his wife Maria Margarete, née Haehnle. At eighteen months, Margarete contracted a high fever that left her legs paralyzed and right arm difficult to raise. After three years, doctors finally diagnosed her with polio. Her parents were keen that she live a full life and investigated many medical treatments with little success. As a child she was taken to school in a small hand-pulled cart by her sisters and other neighborhood children. In her later reminiscences, she recalls, "All the children gathered around me and I organised games in which I was the center of attention. However, the older children often ran off and then I was left babysitting the tiny tots".

Margarete regularly attended school throughout her childhood and in spite of the pain in her right hand, went to the needlework classes of Frau Schelling where she completed her training as a seamstress at the age of 17. She occasionally worked with her sisters, who had opened a women's tailor shop.

Margarete also became an accomplished zither player, teaching others to play to earn some money. Her savings allowed her to buy a sewing machine, the first owned in the town of Giengen, and this led to another opportunity to earn income. Margarete worked on trousseaus for the town folk, and by her mid-twenties was making fashionable clothes and traveling to other towns to work and visit family, sending her cart ahead of her and traveling by post coach.

== Entrepreneurship ==
In 1877, Margarete opened a felt store and began making felt underskirts, which had just become fashionable, for the firm of Christian Siegle in Stuttgart. She was soon able to employ people to work for her and it became a thriving business. Margarete commented: "At this time I came across a pattern for a toy elephant. Felt was the ideal material for this toy and the filling would be of the finest lambswool. Now I could make these as gifts for the children in the family and I tried out the patterns in various sizes". In 1879, the American magazine The Delineator published a pattern for a cloth mouse, rabbit, elephant, and other animal patterns followed. The German magazine Modenwelt then reproduced these patterns. Margarete made many of these toys and gave them as gifts to friends, and by 1880 she started to sell them in small numbers. In the following years she widened her range of small cloth animals based on the magazine patterns, but with small alterations to the cloth used and accessories.

In 1892, Margarete's small company applied for a patent "for making of animals and other figures to serve as playthings". The patent number was DRP 66996, but this was later withdrawn when contested by another German toy manufacturer. Margarete's brother Fritz realised that there was an opportunity to sell large numbers of these toy animals and he took some samples to the market in Heidenheim, coming away with many orders. Production and turnover increased each year as did the variety of toys on offer. Pull-along and ride-on toys were also added with the development of metal frames inside the toys. By 1889, the company moved into a larger building, which had a corner shop where the toys and fabric could be displayed for sale. The words "Felt-Toy-Factory" were painted in large letters on the outside wall. Next came a printed catalogue for customers to order from, and the business grew.

In 1897, Margarete's creative nephew, Richard, joined the company. He had previously studied at the Kunstgewerbeschule (Arts and Crafts Academy) in Stuttgart, Germany. His sketches became the basis for many different Steiff toys.

== First teddy bear ==
Margarete made up all the samples of any new toys herself so she could uncover any problems that might arise in production. Between 1897 and 1899, the Steiff company was designing and making "dancing bear" toys. Rather than the familiar teddy bear, these were standing figures carrying sticks and with rings through their noses imitating the real-life dancing bears that traveled from town to town to provide entertainment at this time, or pull-along bears on wheels.

In 1902, Richard designed "Bear 55 PB", the first soft toy with movable joints, which was to become the world's first teddy bear.

By 1903, a large shipment of toys had been sent to a New York showroom, but there was not much interest in the plush toy bears that were displayed there. In March 1903, Richard took jointed soft toy bears to a spring fair in Leipzig, where they caught the eye of an American buyer, who ordered 3,000 bears. From then on, "Bear 55 PB" became a bestseller in the United States - a remarkable achievement for a small German business from the Swabian Albs. Plush bears such as 55 PB became known as "teddy bears", named after the American President Theodore "Teddy" Roosevelt.

One million teddy bears were produced by 1907.

== Legacy ==
Margarete became an important figure in German female entrepreneurship. Originally from a small town in southern Germany and living with a life-long physical disability, she founded and grew a business that continues to be recognized around the world. In the literature on German entrepreneurs, she is cited as an idol for female entrepreneurship and innovation, growing her business beyond German borders.

Steiff went on to become a famous and sought-after brands of teddy bears and other plush toys. In 1910, Steiff won the Grand Prix at the Brussels International Exposition in Belgium. Steiff continues to be among the well-known plush toy manufacturers in the world. Vintage Steiff toys have become valuable collectibles, with auctions fetching prices that regularly make the news.
