= NAPLC =

The National Association of Police & Lay Charities (NAPLC) is an American 501(c)(3) charity started in 1997 in Washington, D.C.

The mission statement of NAPLC began simply enough, but in time was expanded to allow partnerships with various secular, lay charities. The NAPLC mission broadened into helping reduce the recidivism rate in U.S. prisons, fighting the illiteracy of American school children, and even into helping Deaf people learn a SignWriting modality, that aids in developing their literacy.

After the emergence of NAPLC, the organization began its long association with the Teddy Bear Cop's Program, wherein teddy bears are given by policemen, fire fighters, and emergency rescue workers to children in traumatized situations.

According to Charity Navigator, only 21.4% of the income went to the target program in 2006 (72.6% went to fund raising and 5.9% to administrative expenses). The Better Business Bureau reports that NAPLC did not respond to their requests for information.

== Teddy Bear Cops Program ==
The mission of the Teddy Bear Cops program is to get teddy bears into the hands of police, fire and emergency officials across the country, so that they can give teddy bears to a child or children at the scene of incidents. A similar program is run in the UK by the metropolitan police in partnership with the Great British Teddy bear company who have together created a range of police teddy bears that are given to children at the scene of incidents.

== NAPLC Website ==
Over a decade ago NAPLC started a car donation program on the Internet to raise funds for purchasing teddy bears in large quantities and shipping them to various police and fire officials to forward the Teddy Bear Cops Program.

The NAPLC website has developed into a large and informative site, especially with data regarding charitable vehicle donations. The website provides accurate historical and contemporary information about the Internal Revenue Service laws and changes regarding car donations.

In the early years of its formation it was found that many donors wished to assist the charity but could not benefit by a tax deduction and so the recycling program was launched to always give something back to those that contributed in any way to the Teddy Bear Cops Program.

The NAPLC website has grown to include all the information needed to participate in the US taxpayer vehicle donation program, as well as title transfer information.
