= Hontouso/Sukirai =

"Ho•n•to•u•so / Su•ki•ra•i"

Single by misono

from the album Uchi
- B-side: "Tanabata☆Jita ButterFly♪ feat. misono"
- Released: November 23, 2011
- Genre: J-pop, pop/rock
- Label: Avex Trax (Japan)
- Songwriter(s): Misono

Misono singles chronology
"'...Suki xxx/0-ji Mae no Tsunderella'" (2010)	"Ho•n•to•u•so / Su•ki•ra•i" (2011)	"'Maialino!'" (2012)

Alternative covers
- Limited "Tales of" Edition

Ho•n•to•u•so/Su•ki•ra•i (ホ・ン・ト・ウ・ソ／ス・キ・ラ・イ / Truth and Lies/Love and Hate) is soloist misono's first single released under the pseudonym "Me" and also her first bringing in her new era. The single charted on the Oricon daily charts at #26 and remained on the charts for three consecutive weeks.

== Background ==
Ho•n•to•u•so/Su•ki•ra•i is Japanese singer misono's first single bringing in her new era and seventeenth overall. It is also her first single released under the pseudonym "Me." The single debuted on the Oricon Singles Charts and #26, but dropped to take the #46 slot for the week, remaining on the charts for three weeks. The single was her seventh consecutive double a-side and was her only release in the year of 2011.

The single was released in three editions, each containing different material: CD, CD+DVD and a limited edition CD+DVD combo. The limited edition carried alternate cover art with the characters from the Tales of Symphonia: The Animation, the full animated theme song on the DVD and an alternate version of the music video for her collaborative song "with you," which she performed with BACK-ON, along with her solo version on the CD.

"Ho•n•to•u•so" was used as the theme song to Tales of Symphonia: The Animation World United (テイルズオブ シンフォニアTHE ANIMATION世界統合編). "Su•ki•ra•i" was used as the ending theme to the television program Akko ni Omakase! throughout the months of October and November.

For both "Ho•n•to•u•so" and "Su•ki•ra•i," misono worked with Susumu Nishikawa of the Japanese band Diamond Head. She had previously worked with Nishikawa for her song "...Suki xxx" and during her time in the group day after tomorrow. On the limited editions of the single, misono performed a solo version of the song "with you," which she had originally performed with BACK-ON in February of that year.

== Track listing ==
=== CD only version ===
All lyrics are written by misono

CD
No.	Title	Music	Arranger(s)	Length
1.	"Ho•n•to•u•so" (ホ・ン・ト・ウ・ソ / Truth and Lies)	misono	Susumu Nishikawa	5:01
2.	"Su•ki•ra•i" (ス・キ・ラ・イ / Love and Hate)	misono	Susumu Nishikawa	5:15
3.	"Tanabata☆Jita ButterFly♪ feat. misono" (七夕☆ジタ)	Miki Watanabe	AKIRASTAR	4:09
4.	"Kimi to Watashi no Uta ~ME ver.~" (君と私のうた)	misono	misono

=== CD+DVD ===
All lyrics are written by misono

CD
No.	Title	Music	Arranger(s)	Length
1.	"Ho•n•to•u•so"	misono	Susumu Nishikawa	5:01
2.	"Su•ki•ra•i"	misono	Susumu Nishikawa	5:15
3.	"Tanabata☆Jita ButterFly♪ feat. misono"	Miki Watanabe	AKIRASTAR	4:09
Total length:				14:25

DVD
No.	Title	Length
1.	"Ho•n•to•u•so" (Video Clip)	5:04
2.	"「NO you! NO life! NO...×× ?」 feat. ME" (ME direction ver.)	5:06
Total length:		10:10

=== Tales of version ===
All lyrics are written by misono

CD
No.	Title	Music	Arranger(s)	Length
1.	"Ho•n•to•u•so"	misono	Susumu Nishikawa	5:01
2.	"Su•ki•ra•i"	misono	Susumu Nishikawa	5:15
3.	"Tanabata☆Jita ButterFly♪ feat. misono"	Miki Watanabe	AKIRASTAR	4:09
4.	"with you ~ME ver.~"	misono	BACK-ON	3:45

DVD
No.	Title	Length
1.	"Ho•n•to•u•so ~Tales of Symphonia: The Animation United World ver.~" (Video Clip)	1:31
2.	"tales..." (Tales of Festival 2011 Live Ver.)
3.	"Ho•n•to•u•so" (Tales of Festival 2011 Live Ver.)
4.	"with you feat. ME" (ME direction ver.)	3:49
