= Steiff =

Plush toy company based in Germany

Margarete Steiff GmbH
- Type: Stuffed toy manufacturer
- Industry: Stuffed toys
- Founded: Germany, 1880
- Founder: Margarete Steiff
- Headquarters: Giengen, Germany
- Area served: Worldwide
- Products: Teddy bears, etc.
- Website: www.steiff.com

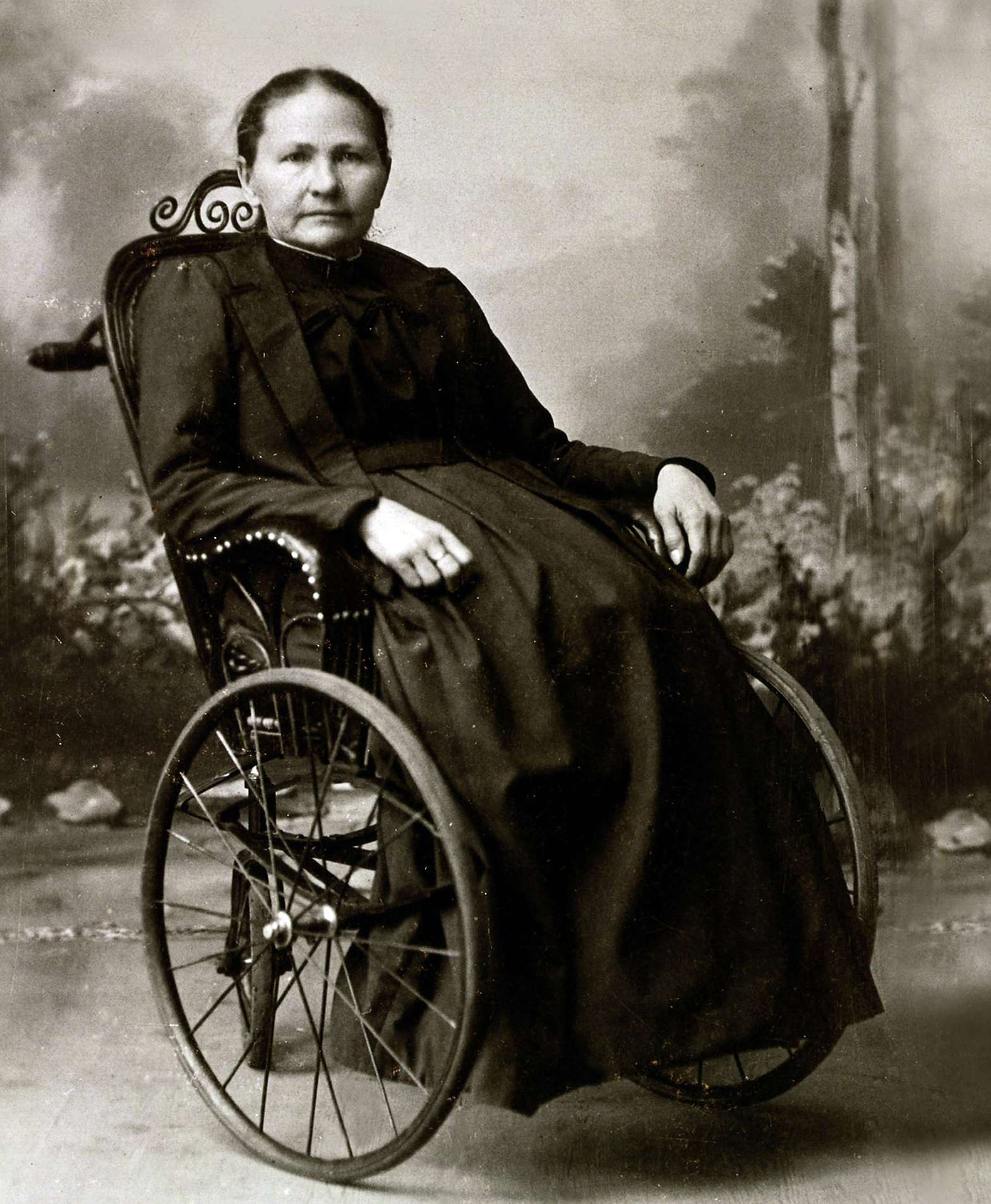
Margarete Steiff

Steiff is a German-based plush toy company, founded in 1880, with headquarters in Giengen, Germany. The company claims to have made the world's first factory-made teddy bear.

== History ==
Steiff was founded in 1880 by Margarete Steiff, a seamstress. She began making fabric elephants that were sold in her shop as pincushions. However, children began playing with them, and in the years following she went on to design many other animal-themed toys for children, such as monkeys, donkeys, horses, camels, pigs, mice, dogs, cats, rabbits, and giraffes.

In 1893, Margarete's felt fabric factory was founded in Giengen, Germany. In 1895, the first Steiff products to be sold outside Germany were sold at Harrods in London, England.

=== Earliest Steiff teddy bears ===
In 1897, Margarete's nephew, Richard Steiff, joined the company and gave it an enormous boost by creating stuffed animals from drawings made at the zoo. Richard attended the School of Applied Arts in Stuttgart and studied in England. He designed the world's first plush bear with movable arms and legs, known as "55 PB".

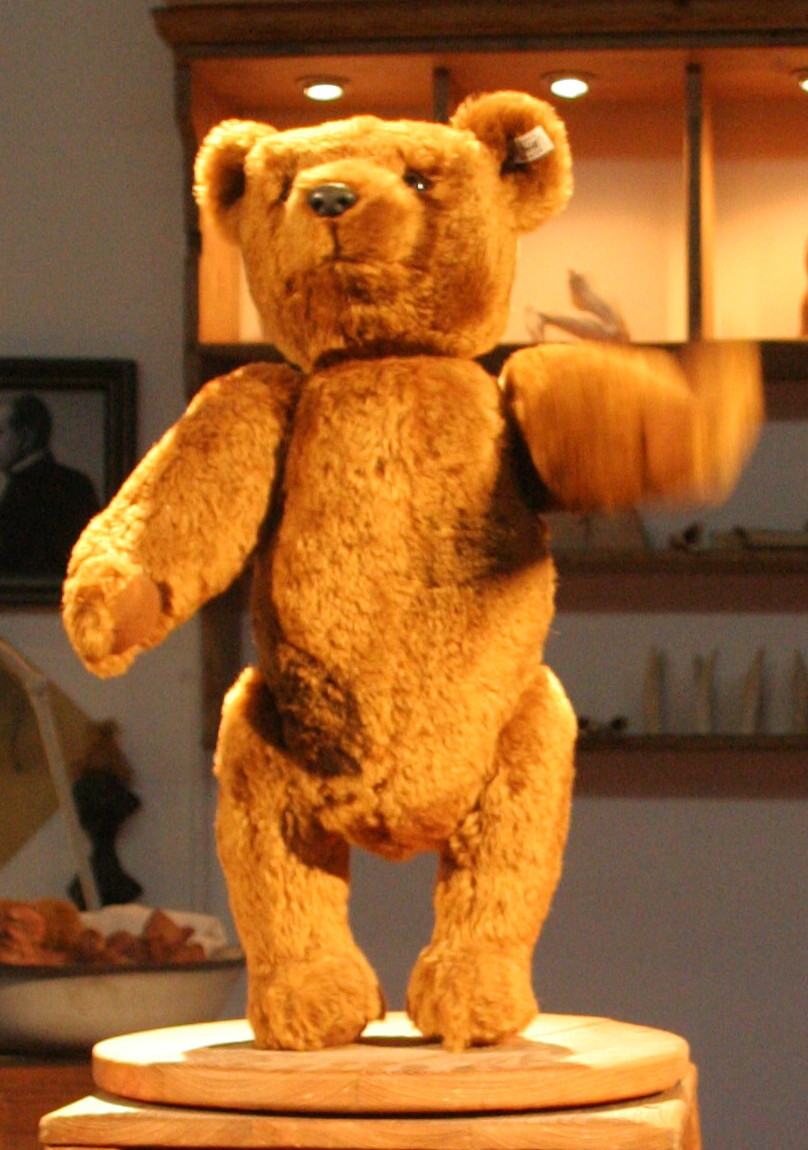
A replica of a Steiff model 55PB, the first Steiff Bear; Steiff-Museum Giengen, Germany, 2006. No original examples are known to survive.

In 1903, a 3,000-piece order was placed by a buyer in America after the "teddy bear" craze began due to a popular cartoon of President Theodore "Teddy" Roosevelt and a young cub in The Washington Post in 1902.

By 1907, Steiff manufactured 974,000 bears, and the company has been increasing its output ever since.

=== Titanic teddy bears ===
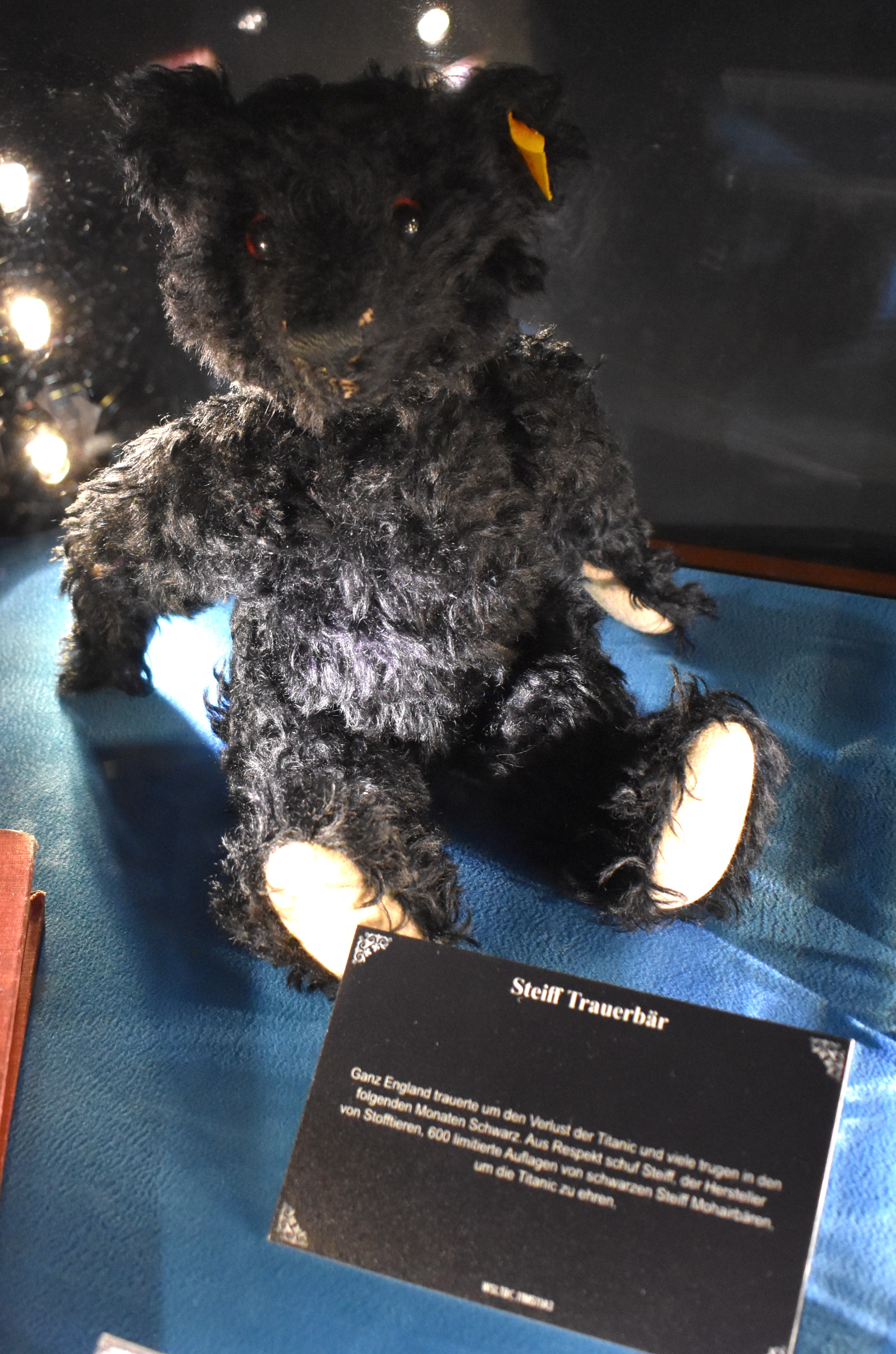
Black teddy bear which was produced in memory of the Titanic

In 1912, in the aftermath of the Titanic disaster that left Britain in mourning, a British toy retailer ordered black Steiff teddy bears to bring comfort to the public. They did not sell very well and production was soon halted, with just 494 made in five different sizes. Today, they are highly coveted by collectors due to their historical relevance and scarcity.

=== Company growth to present day ===
In 1909, when Margarete died of pneumonia, Richard continued his aunt's legacy and further expanded the toy and plush line. He also became the largest stockholder of the company.

In 1925, the Steiff company started using assembly line production to keep up with the high demand. In 1931, Steiff partnered with Disney to manufacture the well-known Disney characters.

By the 1960s, Steiff was known as the largest stuffed toy maker in the world. By 1968, according to Time, the company had 2,100 employees and generated $14 million annually.

In 1980, the Steiff Museum opened in Giengen. This event marked the 100th anniversary of the company. The museum has many artifacts from Margarete Steiff's life.

In 2017, Steiff had revenues of €45 million, or $51 million according to the average exchange rate for the year.

In June 2026, game and toy company Ravensburger acquired a majority stake in Steiff.

=== Luxury teddy bears ===
In 2008, Steiff launched a limited-edition Karl Lagerfeld teddy bear with a price of €1,000. In 2018, Steiff and Tiffany & Co. collaborated to offer a luxury teddy bear. The 10.5-inch, caramel-colored mohair teddy bear retailed for $375.

=== Notable auctions ===
Vintage Steiff teddy bears are prized by collectors, and depending on the type can bring significant sums at auction. In a 1994 auction, the Steiff "Teddy Girl" made in 1904 sold for a record $165,000.

In 2000, a Steiff Louis Vuitton Teddy Bear, with eyes made of sapphire and diamonds, and with gold parts, sold at an auction in Monaco for $2.1 million.

In May 2001, at a London Christie's auction of vintage teddy bears, a pair of Steiff teddy bears made in 1908 went for sale with an estimated value of about $20,000.

In December 2002, "Edwin", a 5 1/2-inch Steiff teddy bear that accompanied a British soldier, Percy Kynnersley-Baddlely, killed in the Battle of the Somme in 1916, was sold for £4,230.

In 2010, a 1925 Steiff Harlequin teddy bear sold at a London Christie's auction for £46,850.

== Craftsmanship ==
The Steiff company motto, as styled by Margarete Steiff, is "Only the best is good enough for children". The company uses natural fibers such as mohair in their products. Steiff products are subject to meticulous testing and inspection. They are required to be highly flame resistant, and, among other things, smaller pieces such as eyes must be able to resist considerable tension, wear, and tear. A large amount of the work is done by hand. It takes eight to 12 months of training for a seamstress to develop the skills to make Steiff bears that meet the company's strict quality standards.

The iconic "button in ear" tag was devised in 1904 by Margarete's nephew Franz to keep counterfeits from being passed off as authentic Steiff toys. It is made of metal. The button is still used to distinguish authentic Steiff toys from fakes. The tag originally had the symbol of an elephant, and it was later replaced by the name "Steiff".
