= Giengen =

- Town
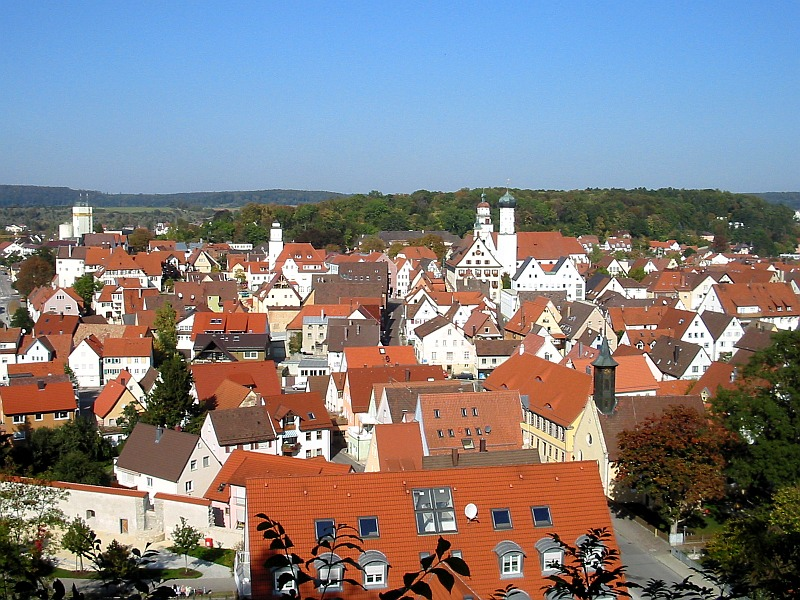
- Giengen from the Bruckersberg

- Coat of arms

- Location of Giengen within Heidenheim district
- Interactive map of Giengen
- Location within Germany Location within Baden-Württemberg
- Coordinates: 48°37′18″N 10°14′42″E
- Country: Germany
- State: Baden-Württemberg
- Admin. region: Stuttgart
- District: Heidenheim
- Subdivisions: 5

Government
  - Mayor (2017–25): Dieter Henle (Ind.)

Area
  - Total: 44.07 km^{2} (17.02 sq mi)
- Elevation: 464 m (1,522 ft)

Population (2025-12-31)
  - Total: 19,857
  - Density: 450.6/km^{2} (1,167/sq mi)
- Time zone: UTC+01:00 (CET)
  - Summer (DST): UTC+02:00 (CEST)
- Postal codes: 89537
- Dialling codes: 07322
- Vehicle registration: HDH
- Website: (in English)

Giengen (German pronunciation: [ˈɡɪŋən]; full name: Giengen an der Brenz [ˈɡɪŋən ʔan deːɐ̯ ˈbʁɛnts], lit. 'Giengen on the Brenz'; Swabian: Gẽänge) is a former Free Imperial City in eastern Baden-Württemberg near the border with Bavaria in southern Germany. The town is located in the district of Heidenheim at the eastern edge of the Swabian Alb, about 30 kilometers northeast of Ulm on the Brenz River.

Giengen is the hometown of the Margarete Steiff corporation, who invented the teddy bear.

Positioned on the Nuremberg-Ulm-Constance route, one of the main feeder routes of the Way of St. James, Giengen is visited each year by an increasing number of walking pilgrims on their way to Santiago de Compostela.

== History ==
The first documentary evidence of the town was contained in a chronicle of the monastery of Peterhausen that reported on the death in battle in 1078 of margrave Diepold II von Vohburg, lord of Giengen. In 1147, Adele, daughter of Diepold III, was married to Emperor Frederick I Barbarossa but was divorced after a few years due to childlessness. Frederick Barbarossa was an occasional visitor and resident and it was probably during his stay in 1171 that he granted market rights and the unicorn coat of arms to the town. Still referred to as a villa (village) in a document dated 1216, Giengen had seemingly attained city (civitas) status by 1252.

=== Free Imperial City (1395–1803) ===
The city was pawned more than once by successive emperors, and the counts of Württemberg and of Oettingen both vied for control over the city. It was only in 1395 that Giengen's status as a Free Imperial City, independent of any lord but the Emperor, was finally acknowledged by all. In 1481, the city was exempted from the jurisdiction of any outside court. Giengen, which has been a member of leagues of Swabian Free cities since the late 14th Century, joined the powerful Swabian League when it was set up in 1488. The city took part in the League's successful war against Württemberg in 1519.

According to the celebrated Reichsmatrikel of 1521 - the document that laid down the military and monetary obligations for each of the Imperial Estates – Giengen was obligated to contribute 2 horsemen, 13 foot soldiers and 60 gulden. That contribution ranked near the bottom on the list of the 85 Free Imperial Cities then in existence, reflecting the small size and modest resources of the city (by comparison, the contribution of nearby Ulm was set at 29, 120 and 600 respectively). Yet, Giengen was to be one of the 50 Free Imperial Cities that were to survive the Thirty Years' War and the Peace of Westphalia and continue as quasi-sovereign entities until 1802-03.

==== Protestant Reformation ====
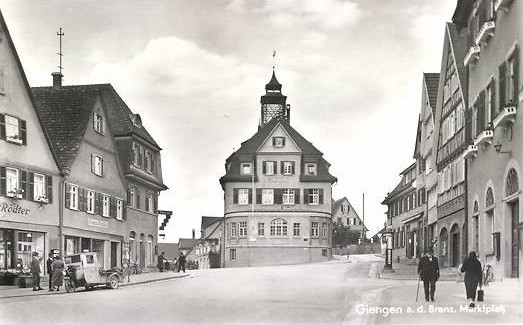
The Marktplatz

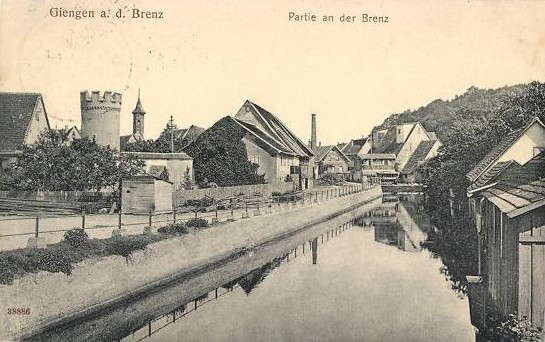
The Brenz River at Giengen, circa 1910

Like almost all the other Imperial Cities, Giengen was profoundly transformed by the Protestant Reformation, which made its way into the city-states before it did into the secular and ecclesiastical principalities of the Empire.

Even before the advent of the Reformation, there had been much discontent against the pervasive influence of the Church, particularly in the Free Imperial Cities that, while largely independent politically, had to contend with the control of the Church in religious matters such as tithes, ecclesiastical tribunals, etc., not counting the fact that religious property and the clergy, both secular and regular, were largely exempted from taxation and civic control. Therefore, a final break with Rome and the local bishop—in the case of Giengen, the Bishop of Augsburg—meant the end of a severe irritant and a significant increase in the political reach of the new Protestant cities and princes who, from then on, would have full control over the reformed clergy, tithes and religious regulations and foundations.

One Kaspar Pfeiffelmann was the first Protestant preacher to preach in Giengen, more specifically at the hospital church in 1528. In 1531, after having been repeatedly requested by local burghers to hire a permanent Evangelical (Lutheran) preacher, the Town Council finally hired preacher and reformer Martin Rauber. The City officially adopted the new Lutheran doctrine in 1537. Later that year, the famous reformer and theologian Martin Bucer from Strasburg visited Giengen. Catholic services were prohibited in 1556 and soon after, following the general trend already well underway in the other Free Cities, Giengen abandoned its conversion policy that relied on quiet persuasion and decreed that all Nonconformists such as the Anabaptists – deemed too radical and a threat to social order and religious peace – had to leave the city if they refused to convert to Lutheranism.

The city suffered heavily during the Thirty Years' War and was looted and ransomed repeatedly by Swedish, Imperial/Spanish and French troops and in 1634 a devastating fire destroyed much of the city. The last soldiers billeted in the city left in August 1650, more than a year after the signing of the Peace of Westphalia. Life very slowly went back to normal and money was found to rebuild the schools and churches. The visiting Duke of Württemberg was wined and dined during a visit in 1655: the tiny independent city-state was entirely surrounded by Württemberg territory and good relations with the dukes were important. The population of Giengen, which has stood at close to 2000 on the eve of the War in 1618, was back to 1200 in 1651 and to 1700 in 1671. From the year of the fire to 1672, some 206 individuals - 95 from the area, 20 from Ulm, 29 from Bavaria and 62 from the rest of the Empire - have purchased Giengen's citizenship (Bürgerrecht). A new tax code adopted by the Town Council in 1677 caused considerable popular discontent and following a complaint to the Aulic Council, an imperial commission composed of the count of Oëttingen and members of the Town Council of Ulm, Giengen's powerful neighbor to the south, ruled that the guilds should be involved in the decision process on taxation. The rule was to remain in force until Giengen ceased to be a Free Imperial City in 1802.

==== Eighteenth century ====
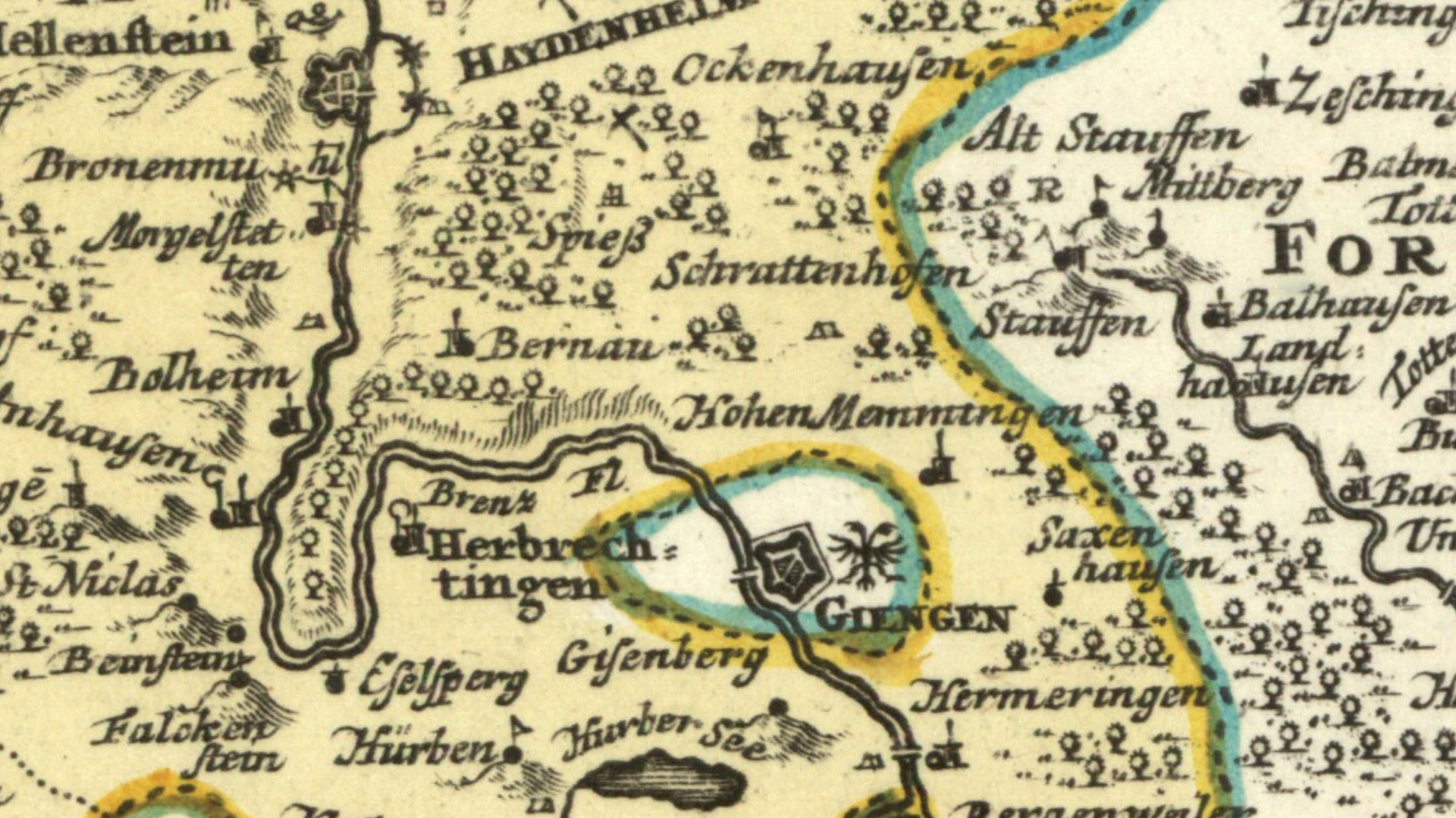
Giengen on an 18th century map

The 18th century was somewhat uneventful for Giengen and the city was relatively spared by the War of the Spanish Succession and the other wars of the century. Not much happened in the sleepy city: the belfry of St. Georg's church was rebuilt after a fire and a new baptismal font was donated by a prominent citizen; an organ-making shop opened business; one Jakob Osswald and his daughter are beheaded for "incestua cum filia". A 1734 survey showed that there were "130 horses, 150 heads of cattle, many pigs and 1,000 sheep" in the tiny Free Imperial City, which had a distinct rural character. In 1732, the city, imitating other Protestant states, took in 12 Protestant families that, along with hundreds of others, had been expulsed from Salzburg by the Prince-Archbishop. Emperor Charles VII stayed briefly at the Bürgermeister's house in 1743, and on his way back from Italy in June 1788, Goethe stayed for two nights at the Goldenen Gans Inn, where he spent 2 gulden in victuals. The population then was about 1770, almost unchanged from a century earlier.

==== End of free imperial city status ====
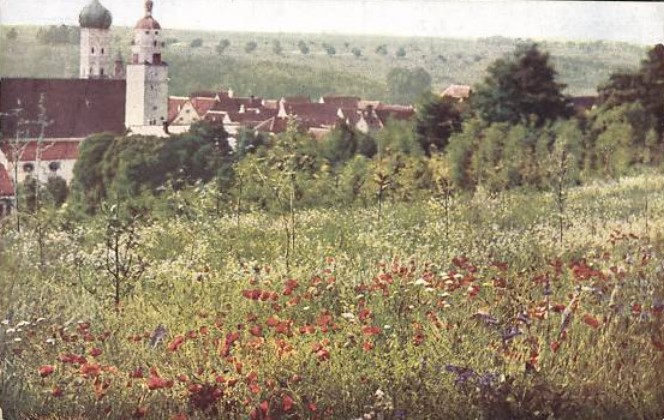
Giengen circa 1910

In the course of the mediatisation of 1802-03, Giengen was not spared the fate of the great majority of the 50 Free Imperial Cities of the moribund Holy Roman Empire and the city lost its independence. On September 5, 1802, Duke Frederick II of Württemberg wrote to "the Mayor and Town Council of the Imperial City of Giengen" that "they should convince themselves of the necessity for Giengen" to be incorporated into his duchy. The following month, the Duke ordered his bailiff in Heidenheim to enter Giengen and take possession. At that time, the city - one of the 15 Free Imperial Cities to be absorbed into Württemberg between 1802 and 1810 - was home to 464 families, had 1,695 inhabitants, 354 houses, 119 barns, and a budget surplus of 6,000 gulden.

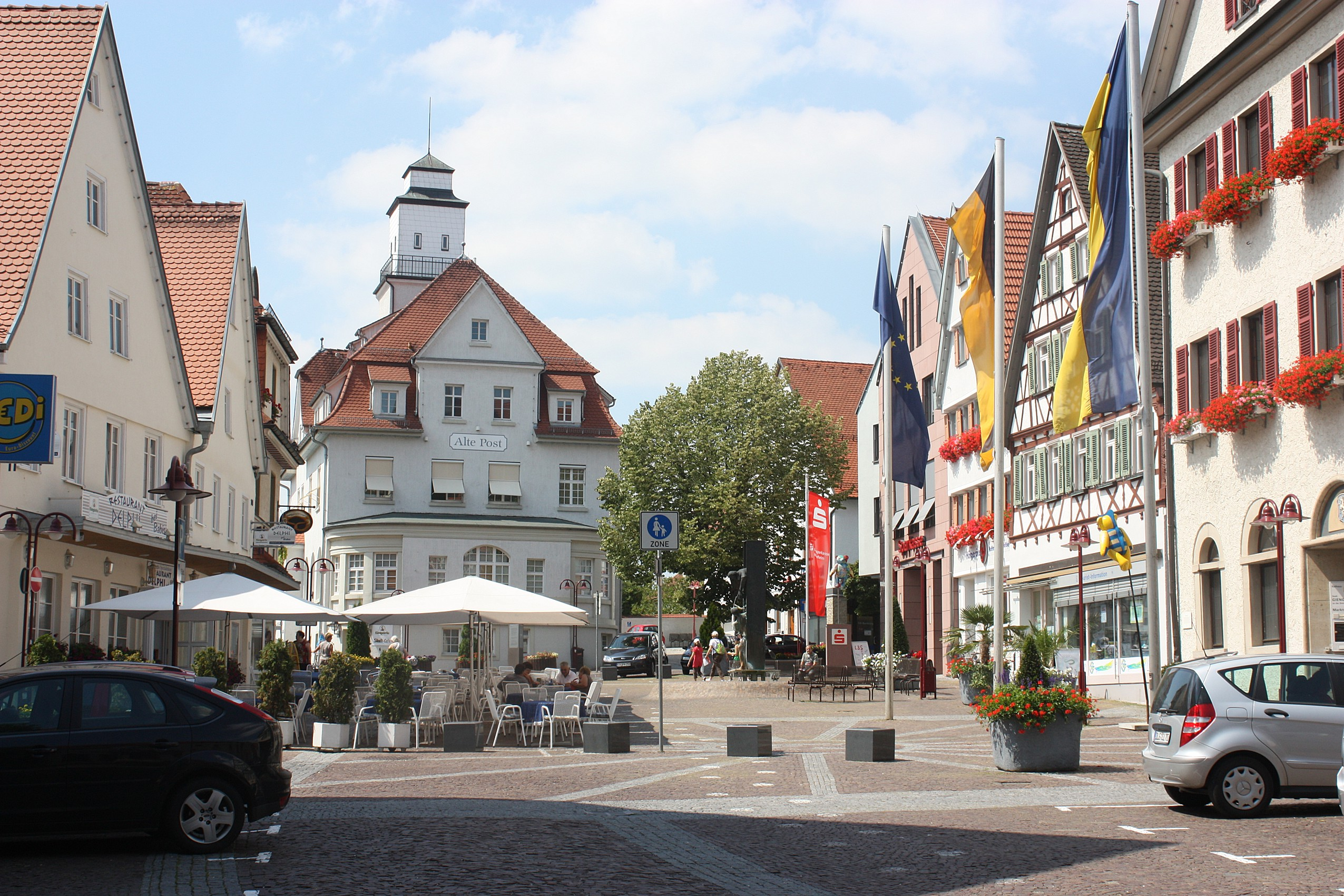
Giengen-an-der-Brenz

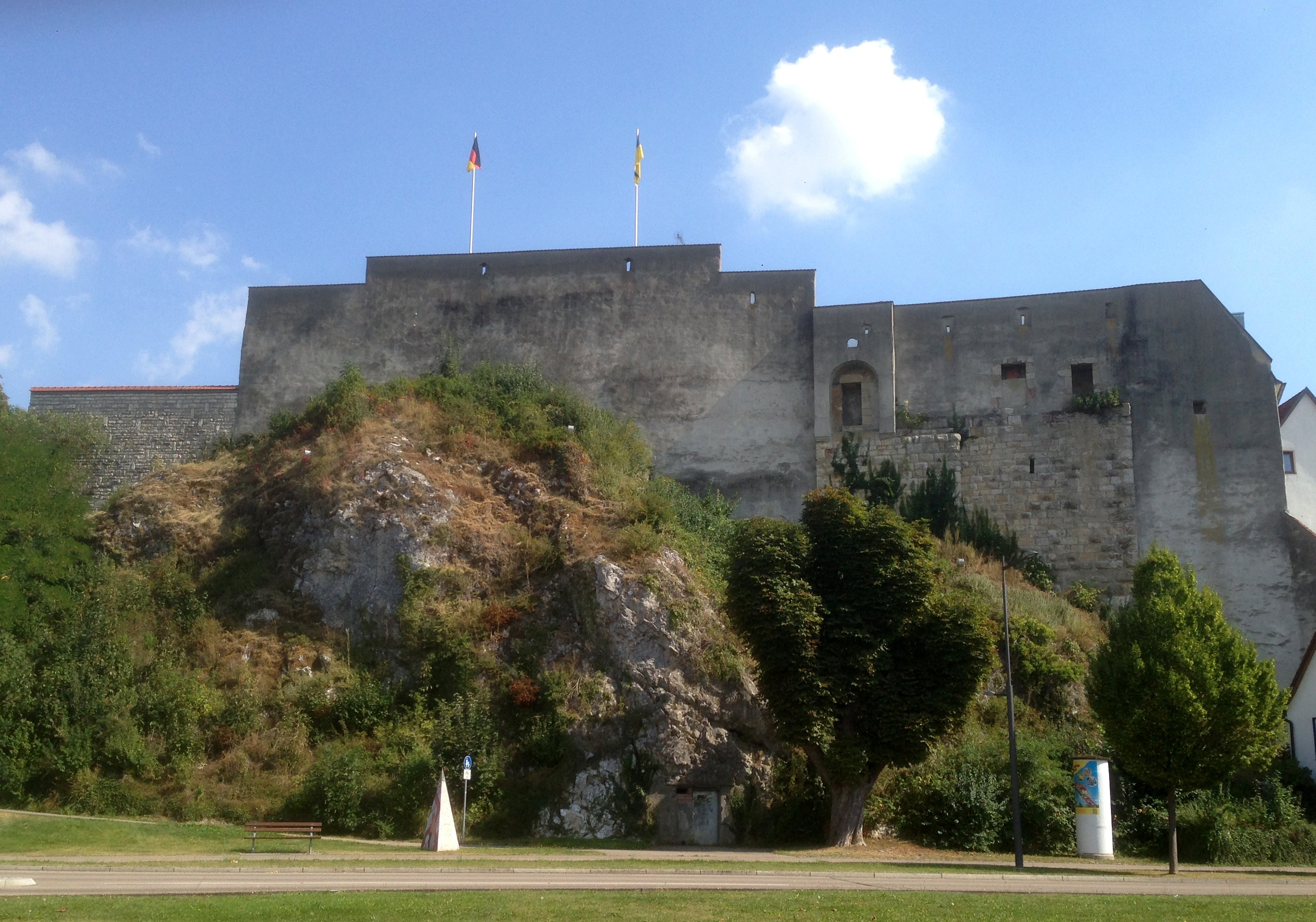
Giengen-Town wall

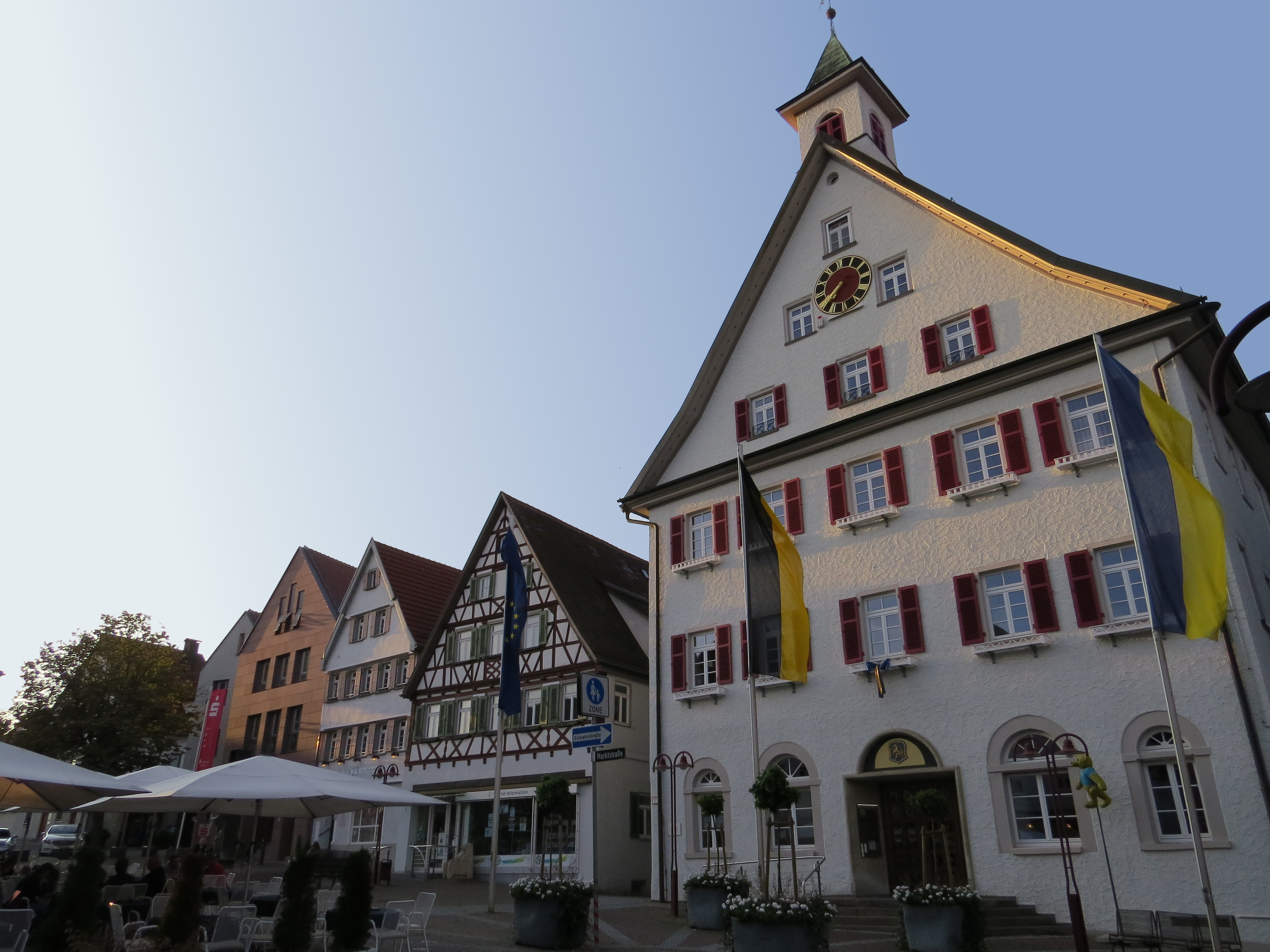
Giengen Town hall

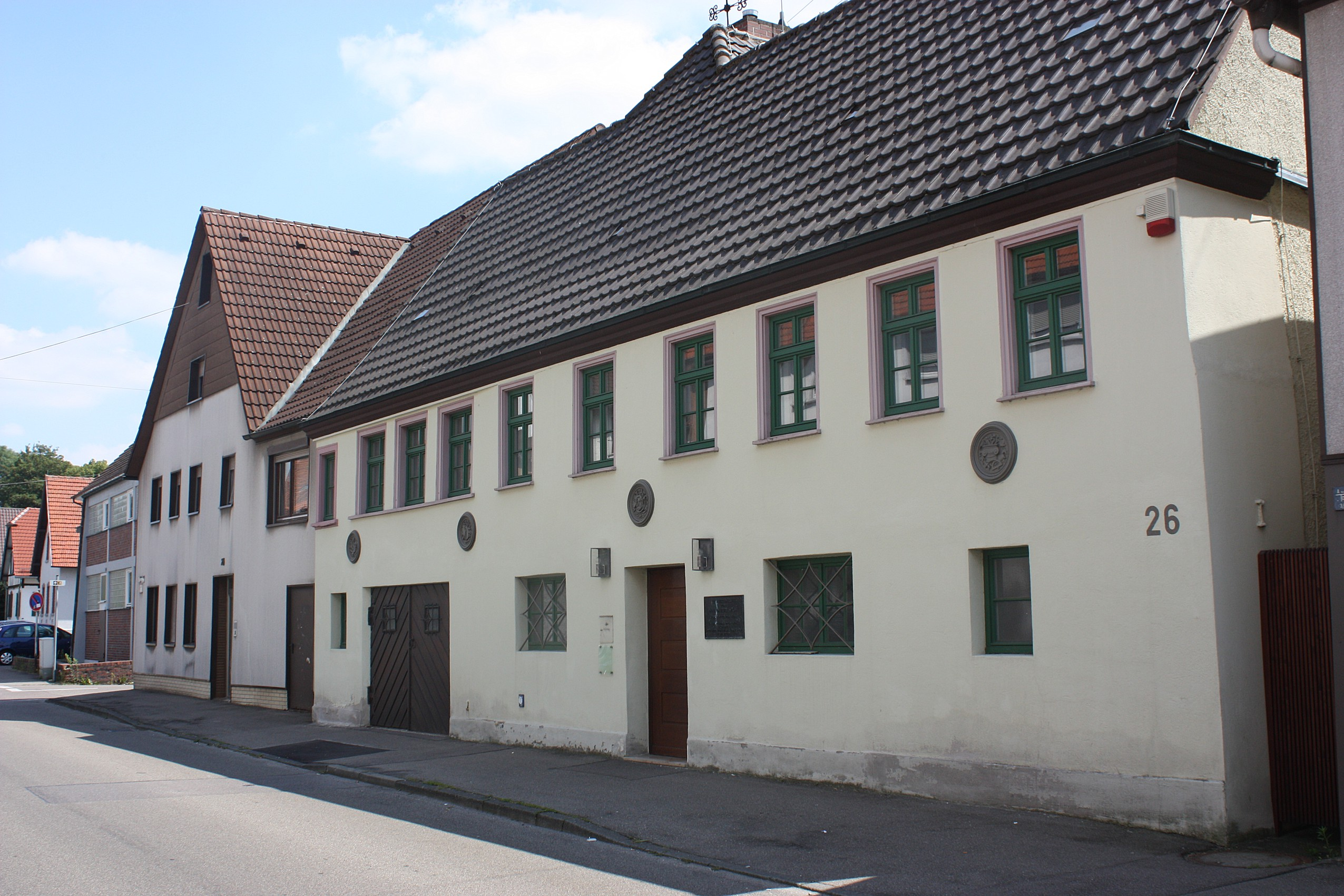
Birthplace Margarete Steiff

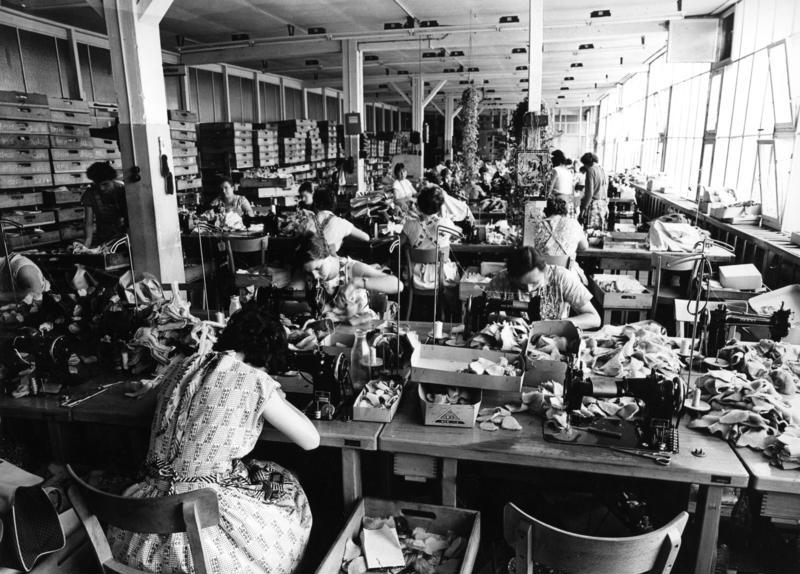
Teddy bear production at Margarete Steiff GmbH, Giengen, 1960

== Mayors ==
- 1819–1826: Johannes Oswald
- 1826–1848: Martin
- 1848–1851: Lorenz David Wencher
- 1851–1860: Anton Fink
- 1860–1891: Lorenz David Wencher
- 1891-1929: Julius Brezger
- 1929–1945: Christian Ehrlinger
- 1945–1948: Adolf Kolb
- 1948–1977: Walter Schmid
- 1977–2001: Siegfried Rieg
- 2001–2009: Clemens Stahl
- 2009-2017: Gerrit Elser
- October 2017 – present: Dieter Henle

== Notable people ==
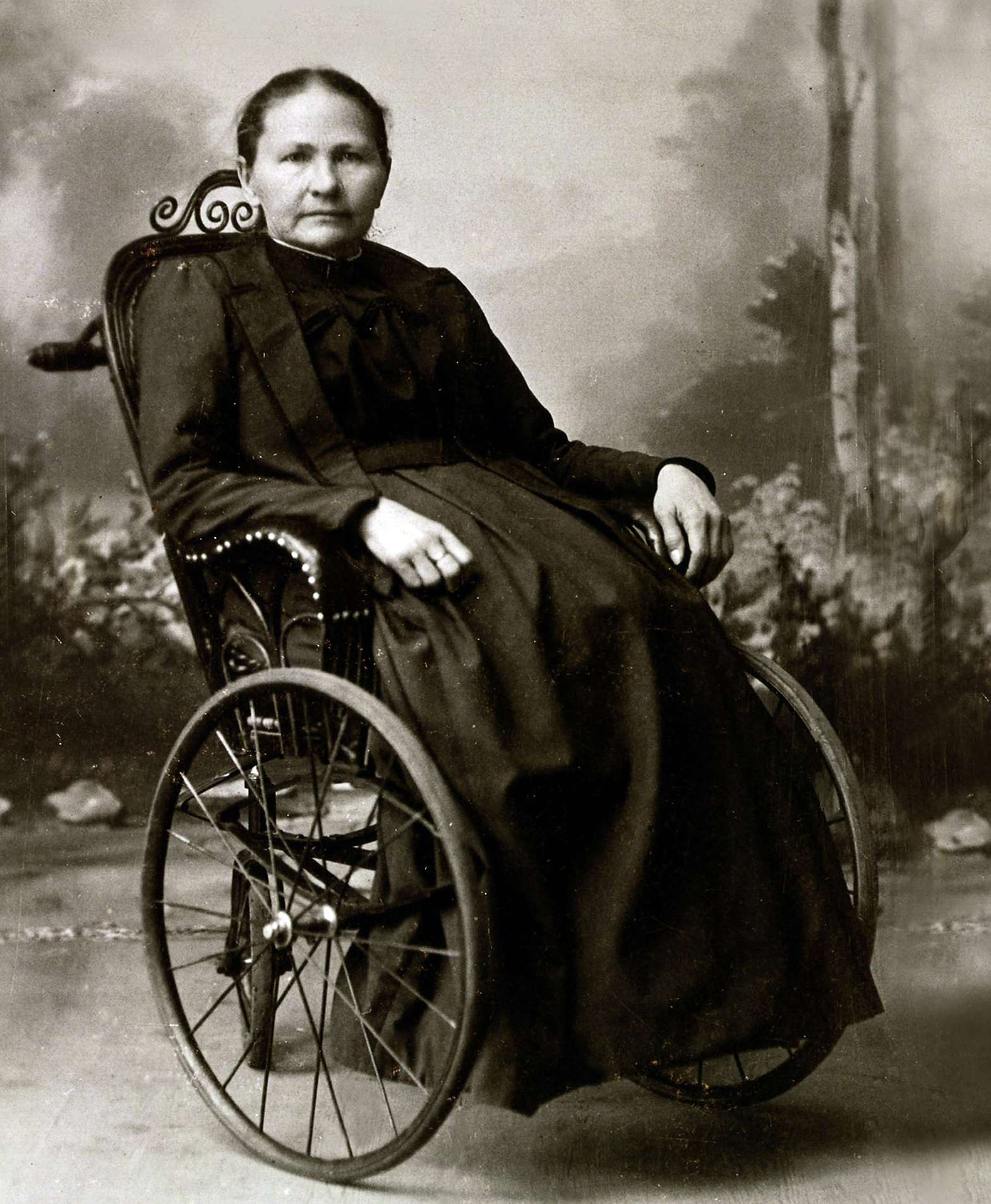
Margarete Steiff

- Jacob Heerbrand (1521–1600), professor of theology, chancellor and prophet in Tübingen
- Margarete Steiff (1847–1909), founder of the toy factory Steiff
- Max von Zabern (1903–1991), district administrator and banker
- Karl Gerold (1906–1973), journalist, editor of the Frankfurter Rundschau
- Erich Ehrlinger (1910–2004), mass murderer, SS Brigade Commander and Commander of Security Police Russia Center
- Ursula Späth (born 1937), patron of the National Association "Action Multiple Sclerosis ill patients" (BLACKBIRD), widow of Lothar Späth
- Jörg Knoblauch (born 1949), entrepreneur and author
- Jochen Klein (1967–1997), painter
- Frank Zeller (born 1969), chess player, coach and author
- Andreas Stoch (born 1969), lawyer and politician (SPD), minister of education in Baden-Württemberg 2013–2016
- Franz Garlik, musician and actor

=== Freemen ===
The municipality of Giengen awarded the freemanship to the following people:

- 1875 Johann Vötsch, teacher (1824 East Village – 1897 Ulm)
- 1894 Josef Stocker, forester (1822 Bühlertann – 1895 Giengen)
- 1902 Christian Baumann, senior teacher (1830 – 1913, born and died in Giengen)
- 1906 Karl Rau, architect of town (1830 – 1913, born and died in Giengen)
- 1908 Hans Haehnle, Commerce, member of the Reichstag (1839 Giengen – 1909 Winnental)
- 1909 August Dieterlen, professor (1847 Gönningen – 1923 Stuttgart)
- 1920 Georg Käumle, Rector (1853 Gärtringen – 1936 Stuttgart)
- 1921 Dr. Paul Wörnle, forest official (1869 – 1937, born and died in Stuttgart)
- 1929 Julius Brezger, mayor (1861 Giengen – 1930 Göppingen)
- 1930 Lina Hähnle, founder and chairman of Bund für Vogelschutz, later transformed in Nature Conservation Union (1851 Sulz am Neckar – 1941 Giengen)
- 1977 Walter Schmid, mayor (1910 – 1994 Giengen)
- 1988 Hans Otto Steiff, producer (1919 – 1994, born and died in Giengen)
- 2001 Siegfried Rieg, mayor (1977–2001).
