= Hoko =

Hoko may refer to:

== Places ==
- Hoko, Kachin State, a village in Kachin State, Burma
- Hōko Prefecture, administrative division of Taiwan under Japanese rule, corresponding to present-day Penghu County
- Hōkō temple, name of several Japanese temples, see Hōkō-ji (disambiguation)
- Hoko River, a river that flows in Clallam County, Washington
- Hoko River Formation, a Late Eocene marine sedimentary geologic formation
- Hoko River Archeological Site, is a 2,500-year-old fishing camp

== People ==
- Paul Hodkinson a.k.a. Hoko (born 14 September 1965), boxer
- Hayashi Hōkō (1644–1732), Japanese Neo-Confucian scholar, teacher and administrator
- Houko Kuwashima (born 1975), Japanese voice actress and singer
- Hōkō Shimamura (1890–1944) Japanese photographer

== Other uses ==
- Hoko (dance), Easter Island dance similar to Maori haka
- Hoko (doll), Japanese doll used as a talisman
- Hōkō (mythology), dog-like tree spirit, equivalent to Chinese Penghou
- Hoko yari, old Japanese spear
- Hoko system, administrative system employed in Japanese-controlled Taiwan
- Hoko, an album by the late Zimbabwean musician Simon Chimbetu

== See also ==
- Dasoku Hokō, is the debut album by GO!GO!7188
