= Hako =

Hako may refer to:

== People ==
- Irie Hakō (1887–1948), Japanese painter
- Hako Isawa, a character in Japanese anime/manga Air Gear; see List of Air Gear characters#Hako Isawa
- Hako Natsuno, a main character in Japanese manga Meteor Prince

== Places ==
- Hako, Aragatsotn, Armenia, a village
- Mount Hako, a mountain in the Kitami Mountains, Hokkaidō, Japan

== Other uses ==
- Hako GmbH, a German tractor and street sweeper manufacturer
- Hakö language, an Austronesian language
- Ngāti Hako, a Māori iwi of New Zealand
- Scion Hako Coupe, a 2004 Japanese/American concept subcompact hatchback
- Hako, a 2008 story game by Japanese video game company Illusion

== See also ==
- Hoko (disambiguation)
