= Gyotaku (album) =

Studio album by GO!GO!7188
- Released: 21 November 2001
- Genre: Rock
- Length: 48:49
- Label: Toshiba-EMI

GO!GO!7188 chronology
Dasoku Hokou (2000)	Gyotaku (2001)	Tora no Ana (2002)

Singles from Gyotaku
- 1. "Dotanba de Cancel" Released: 11 April 2001; 2. "Aa Seishun" Released: 11 July 2001; 3. "C7" Released: 24 October 2001

Gyotaku (魚磔, Gyotaku) is the second album by GO!GO!7188, released in 2001. In celebration of the 25th anniversary of the band's debut, the album, along with Dasoku Hokō, was released on vinyl on September 24, 2025. In addition to the original album tracks, this edition included songs taken from its singles.

== Reception ==
Writing for The Japan Times, Steve McClure called Gyotaku "one of the best J-pop/rock albums of the year" and noted the improvement of Yuu and Akko's songwriting, highlighting "Aa Seishun", "Honne Fuusen" and "Sakurajima". It reached a peak position of number 17 on the Oricon Albums Chart.

== Track listing ==
All lyrics are written by Akiko Hamada; all music is composed by Yumi Nakashima.

CD
No.	Title	Length
1.	"Bungu (文具, Stationery)"	3:34
2.	"C7" (album mix)	4:13
3.	"Aa Seishun (あぁ青春, Ah, Youth)"	3:45
4.	"A.M. 7:30"	4:30
5.	"Honne Fuusen (本音風船, True-Intention Balloon)"	5:46
6.	"Sakurajima (桜島, Sakurajima)"	4:07
7.	"Dotanba de Kyanseru (ドタン場でキャンセル, Last-Minute Cancellation)"	4:38
8.	"Koi no Dokuyaku (恋の毒薬, Love Drug)"	3:44
9.	"Me Mimi Hana Kuchi (めみみはなくち, Eyes, Ears, Nose, Mouth)"	2:53
10.	"Tokage 3-gō (とかげ3号, Lizard #3)"	3:54
11.	"Koibito (こいびと, Sweetheart)"	4:46
