= Antenna (GO!GO!7188 album) =

アンテナ (Antenna)

Studio album by GO!GO!7188
- Released: 4 February 2009
- Genre: Rock
- Label: BMG Japan

GO!GO!7188 chronology
569 (2007)	アンテナ (Antenna) (2009)	Go!!GO!GO!Go!! (2010)

Singles from アンテナ (Antenna)
- 1. "Kataomoi Fighter" Released: 28 May 2008; 2. "Futashika Tashika" Released: 14 January 2009

Antenna (アンテナ, Antenna) is the seventh studio album by Japanese rock band GO!GO!7188. The limited release first press also included a DVD featuring the music video for the single "Futashika Tashika" and footage from their Omatase Tour in 2008. Japanese singer, model and actress Non, who played in a GO!GO!7188 cover band in middle school, stated that the album was the first CD she ever bought. The album also contained the single "Kataomoi Fighter" which was used as the ending theme of the anime adaption of Itazura na Kiss in 2008.

== Reception ==
Reception for Antenna was mixed. In their review for Rockin'On Japan, Toshiaki Endo labeled the album as "a masterpiece" and highlighted the variety present in the music and lyrics. AllMusic's review was less positive, with Alexey Eremenko stating that while the record wasn't completely lacking in enjoyment, "it still feels like Antenna could have been left on the recording studio floor, because records by Green Day, Fall Out Boy, and Spitz have all the riffs and melodies found on this album, anyway." Writing for The Japan Times, Daniel Robson received the album less positively compared to the band's previous works, explaining: "Their new album, 'Antenna,' is a more straightforward affair. Tempos and styles still turn on a dime, but it’s not as rhythmically diverse, not as instantly immersive. It’s more . . . normal."

== Charts ==
=== Weekly charts ===
Chart performance for Antenna
Chart	Peak position
Billboard Japan Top Album Sales	13
Oricon Albums Chart	10

== Track listing ==
All lyrics are written by Akko; all music is composed by Yū, except where otherwise noted.

CD
No.	Title	Lyrics	Music	Length
1.	"Chikyū Saigo no Hi (地球最後の日, The Earth's Last Day)"			4:15
2.	"Chin Ton Shan (ちんとんしゃん)"
3.	"Antenna (アンテナ)"			4:11
4.	"Futashika Tashika (ふたしかたしか, Unclear, Clear)"			7:07
5.	"Tobihane March (飛び跳ねマーチ, Flying March)"			4:13
6.	"Kuwazu Girai (食わずギライ, Knock it before trying)"			4:46
7.	"Kataomoi Fighter (片思いファイター, Unrequited Love Fighter)"			3:55
8.	"On the Mayuge ~Kirisugite~ (On the まゆ毛 ～切りすぎて～, On the Eyebrow: Sliced too much)"			4:32
9.	"Communication Gap (コミュニケーションギャップ)"			3:20
10.	"Manten no Hoshi Haru no Niwa (満天の星 春の庭, Starry Sky, Spring Garden)"			5:55
11.	"Hamori Everyday (ハモリエヴリデイ, Harmony Everyday)"			3:41
12.	"Ame no Hi Dake no Koi (雨の日だけの恋, Rainy Day Love)"	Turkey, Akko	Turkey	4:16
