= 569 (album) =

569 (Go Rock)

Studio album by GO!GO!7188
- Released: 24 October 2007
- Genre: Rock
- Label: BMG Japan

GO!GO!7188 chronology
| Parade (2006) | 569 (Go Rock) (2007) | アンテナ (Antenna) (2009) |

Singles from 569
- 1. "Manatsu no Dancehall" Released: 28 June 2007

569 (ゴーロック, Gō Rokku) is the sixth studio album by Japanese rock band GO!GO!7188. The title is a play on words with the Japanese pronunciation of 569 sounding like the English Go Rock. The limited release first press also included a DVD featuring video highlights of their first tour in the United States in March 2007.

== Reception ==
In an article for The Japan Times in 2009, Daniel Robson called 569 one of the band's "best records", along with Tategami and Parade. The album peaked at number 15 on the Oricon Albums Chart.

== Track listing ==
All lyrics are written by Akiko Noma; all music is composed by Yumi Nakashima.

CD
| No. | Title | Arranger(s) | Length |
|---|---|---|---|
| 1. | "Ashi no Ke (あしのけ, Leg Hair)" | Shigekazu Aida, GO!GO!7188 | 2:43 |
| 2. | "Nōnai Traveler (脳内トラベラー, Mind Traveler)" | GO!GO!7188 | 4:30 |
| 3. | "Manatsu no Dance Hall (真夏のダンスホール, Midsummer Dance Hall)" | Shigekazu Aida, GO!GO!7188 | 4:07 |
| 4. | "San-nin no Boogie Man (3人のブギーマン, Three Boogie Men)" | Shigekazu Aida, GO!GO!7188 | 3:46 |
| 5. | "Sekai no Shasō Kara (世界の車窓から, From the Car Window of the World)" | Shigekazu Aida, GO!GO!7188 | 4:26 |
| 6. | "Nemuri no Asase (眠りの浅瀬, Shoals of Sleep)" | Shigekazu Aida, GO!GO!7188 | 4:50 |
| 7. | "Rock Star ni Natta Nara (ロックスターになったなら, If I Were a Rock Star)" | GO!GO!7188 | 3:47 |
| 8. | "Chain (チェーン)" | GO!GO!7188 | 4:04 |
| 9. | "I'm Lucky Girl (アイムラッキーガール)" | Shigekazu Aida, GO!GO!7188 | 4:13 |
| 10. | "Manhole (マンホール)" | GO!GO!7188 | 4:01 |
| 11. | "Chiisa na Tsumeato (小さな爪跡, Little Scratch)" | Shigekazu Aida, GO!GO!7188 | 3:21 |
| 12. | "Aoi Yoru (青い夜, Blue Night)" | Shigekazu Aida, GO!GO!7188 | 4:41 |
| 13. | "Esoragoto (えそらごと, Pipe Dream)" | GO!GO!7188 | 3:36 |
