= Iroha (disambiguation) =

The Iroha is a Japanese poem.

Iroha may also refer to:

== People with the given name ==
- Irohahime, daughter of Sengoku daimyo Date Masamune.
- Hokazono Iroha (外薗 彩羽; born 2008), Japanese member of South Korean girl group Illit
- Iroha Nagata (長田いろは; born 1998), Japanese rugby union and sevens player
- Iroha Okuda (奥田 いろは; born 2005), Japanese member of Japanese female idol group Nogizaka46

== People with the surname ==
- Benedict Iroha (born 1969), Nigerian former association football defender
- Takumi Iroha (born 1993), Japanese female professional wrestler

== Fictional characters ==
- Iroha (いろは), a character from Pop'n Music.
- Iroha, a character in Samurai Shodown
- Iroha Igarashi, a female character in Real Girl (manga)
- Iroha Inukai, a female character in Wonderful PreCure!
- Iroha Isshiki, a female character in My Teen Romantic Comedy SNAFU
- Kazama Iroha, a Virtual YouTuber under Hololive Production
- Nekomura Iroha, a Vocaloid synthesizer software
- Iroha Nijiue, a female character in the Danganronpa fangame Super Danganronpa Another 2
- Iroha Sakayori, a character from Cosmic Princess Kaguya!
- Iroha Tamaki, a fictional character and main protagonist of the mobile game Magia Record

== Music ==
- Iroha (album) is the debut album from Japanese rock band Chirinuruwowaka
- Iroha (band), an experimental rock band from Birmingham, England

== Others ==
- Iroha (イロハ), a brand of female masturbation aids by the Japanese company Tenga
- Iroha, A train service in Nikko Line
- Iroha Jiruishō, is a 12th-century Japanese dictionary of Kanji
- Irop'a, Korean textbook of Japanese published in 1492

== See also ==
- Hanasaku Iroha, a 2010 anime and 2011 manga
