= Go!!GO!GO!Go!! =

Studio album by GO!GO!7188
- Released: 2 June 2010
- Genre: Rock
- Label: FlyingStar Records

GO!GO!7188 chronology
アンテナ (Antenna) (2009)	Go!!GO!GO!Go!! (2010)

Go!!GO!GO!Go!! is the eighth and final studio album by Japanese rock band GO!GO!7188. It was the band's first album to be released on FlyingStar Records.

== Charts ==
=== Weekly charts ===
Chart performance for Go!!GO!GO!Go!!
Chart	Peak position
Billboard Japan Top Album Sales	10
Oricon Albums Chart	9

== Track listing ==
All lyrics are written by Akko; all music is composed by Yū, except where otherwise noted.

CD
No.	Title	Music	Length
1.	"EOEOE (エオエオエ)"		4:52
2.	"Refrain Refrain (リフレイン リフレイン)"		4:20
3.	"Mayakashi no Sekai (まやかしの世界, Make-believe World)"	Yū, Turkey	4:52
4.	"Saigo no Bansan (最後の晩餐, The Last Supper)"		4:52
5.	"Doku Ringo (毒リンゴ, Poisoned Apple)"		4:04
6.	"Ballad (バラード)"		6:03
7.	"Rakuen no Ohanashi (楽園のおはなし, The Tale of Paradise)"		5:18
8.	"Kutsu Shita no Ana ~Ashi no Ke Chanto Sotta no ni~ (くつ下の穴～あしのけちゃんと剃ったのに～, Holes in My Socks: I Shaved My Legs)"		4:42
9.	"Mimitabu Ni-gō (耳たぶ2号, Earlobe No. 2)"		4:05
10.	"Sugar & Spice (シュガー＆スパイス)"		3:41
11.	"Ee ja Nai ka (ええじゃないか, Isn't It Nice)"		5:07
12.	"Kyō no Uta (今日の歌, Today's Song)"		4:17
13.	"Nothing2"		6:42
14.	"365 Renkyū Boogie (365連休ブギ, 365-Day Holiday Boogie)" (extra track)	Turkey, Akko	3:53
