= Parade (GO!GO!7188 album) =

Studio album by GO!GO!7188
- Released: 18 October 2006
- Genre: Rock
- Length: 46:26
- Label: Toshiba-EMI
- Producer: Shigekazu Aida; Akito Katayose; Shinya Okuno

GO!GO!7188 chronology
Best of GO!GO! (2006)	Parade (2006)	569 (2007)

Singles from Parade
- 1. "Kinkyori Ren'ai" Released: 13 September 2006

Parade (パレード, Parēdo) is a 2006 album by Japanese rock band GO!GO!7188. Parade featured production by Shigekazu Aida, Akito Katayose of Great 3 and Shinya Okuno of Soul Flower Union. It was the band's first original album to use an English title. In celebration of the 25th anniversary of GO!GO!7188's debut, Parade was released on vinyl for the first time in January 2026. This edition included several bonus tracks, such as the song "Kami-sama no Hima Tsubushi", originally from the Best of GO!GO! compilation album.

The album peaked at number four on the Oricon albums chart. Writing for The Japan Times, Daniel Robson was positive of the album, calling it "an edgy pop record that shines" and noted "nods to Radiohead, Muse and Shiina Ringo." Actress and singer Non cited the track "Ameagari Asphalt Atarashii Kutsu de" as one of the "important songs from [her] teenage years."

== Track listing ==
All lyrics are written by Akiko Noma; all music is composed by Yumi Nakashima, arranged by GO!GO!7188, except where otherwise noted.

CD
No.	Title	Lyrics	Arranger(s)/ Producer(s)	Length
1.	"Kinkyori Ren'ai (近距離恋愛, Short-distance relationship)"	Akiko Hamada	Shigekazu Aida	3:33
2.	"Ameagari Asphalt Atarashii Kutsu de (雨上がり アスファルト 新しい靴で, In New Shoes on the Asphalt Following Rain)"	Akiko Noma, Akito Katayose	Akito Katayose	3:54
3.	"Ska (スカ)"		Shinya Okuno, Shigekazu Aida	3:17
4.	"Shangri-la (シャングリラ)"		Akito Katayose	4:11
5.	"Parade (パレード)"		Shigekazu Aida	6:48
6.	"Yuki ga Furanai Machi (雪が降らない街, A City Where it Doesn't Snow)"		Akito Katayose	3:22
7.	"Lullaby Count Down (ララバイカウントダウン)"		Shinya Okuno, Shigekazu Aida	3:30
8.	"Fat na Kare (Fatな彼, Fat Guy)"		Shinya Okuno	4:11
9.	"Ran Ran Ran (ランランラン, Lan Lan Lan)"		Akito Katayose	3:43
10.	"Eiga to Amefuri no Asa (映画と雨降りの朝, A Morning of Movies and Falling Rain)"		Akito Katayose	5:01
11.	"Hitoritabi (ひとりたび, Traveling alone)"		Shinya Okuno	4:44
