= Ryūzetsuran =

Studio album by GO!GO!7188
- Released: 27 October 2004
- Genre: Rock
- Length: 48:53
- Label: Toshiba-EMI

GO!GO!7188 chronology
Kyū Ni Ichi Jiken (2003)	Ryūzetsuran (2004)	Gonbuto Tour Nippon Budokan (Kanzenban) (2005)

Singles from Ryūzetsuran
- 1. "Aoi Kiretsu" Released: 25 August 2004

Ryūzetsuran (竜舌蘭, Agave) is a 2004 album by Japanese rock band GO!GO!7188. It was released on vinyl in January 2026 as part of the commemoration of 25 years since GO!GO!7188's professional debut. A two-disc set, this edition included the non-album single "Ruriiro", among other bonus tracks.

== Reception ==
Ryūzetsuran reached a top position of five on the Oricon chart. In an article for The Japan Times, Daniel Robson cited Ryūzetsuran as an example of Go!Go!7188 at their worst, calling it "a duff album". The record was credited by Misaki Yoshikawa of rock band Shishamo for providing her musical roots, being the first album she listened to with a "strong sense of awareness."

== Track listing ==
All lyrics are written by Akiko Hamada; all music is composed by Yumi Nakashima, arranged by GO!GO!7188.

CD
No.	Title	Length
1.	"Akai Tsuki ni Hoeru Yoru (赤い月に吠える夜, A Night for Howling at the Red Moon)"	4:01
2.	"Aoi Kiretsu (青い亀裂, Blue Crack)"	3:37
3.	"Violet no Sora (バイオレットの空, Violet Sky)"	4:00
4.	"Futatsu no Ashioto (二つの足音, Two Footsteps)"	5:50
5.	"Sennichikō (千日紅, Gomphrena)"	3:13
6.	"Kunoichi (くのいち, Female ninja)"	4:57
7.	"Taxi (タクシー)"	3:48
8.	"Tokyo (東京)"	4:46
9.	"Umi no Uma (うみのうま, Sea Horse)"	2:58
10.	"Shoshū (初秋, Early Autumn)"	3:47
11.	"Kangaegoto (考え事, Thoughts)"	4:26
12.	"Otona no Himitsu (大人のひみつ, The Secrets of Adults)"	3:30
