= Tategami (GO!GO!7188 album) =

Studio album by GO!GO!7188
- Released: 26 February 2003
- Genre: Rock
- Length: 55:30
- Label: Toshiba-EMI

GO!GO!7188 chronology
Tora no Ana (2002)	Tategami (2003)	Kyu Ni Ichi Jiken (2003)

Singles from Tategami
- 1. "Ukifune" Released: 09 October 2002; 2. "Tane" Released: 25 April 2003

Tategami (Japanese: 鬣, Hepburn: Tategami; lit. 'Mane') is a 2003 album by GO!GO!7188. The title translates as mane in English. The first press limited edition CD includes a special version of the single "Ukifune" as a bonus track. The album also received a limited first press vinyl edition, released on the same day as the CD. As part of the band's 25th anniversary celebration, Tategami was reissued on vinyl in January 2026. This was preceded by the release of a new music video for "Ukifune" in October 2025.

== Reception ==
Reviewing Tategami for AllMusic, Ian Martin highlighted the melodies as well as Akko and Yuu's vocal contributions and commented that despite its flaws, "the album still packs each song full of plenty of surprises." Chie Furukawa was also positive of Tategami, calling it "a work that cannot be ignored." The Japan Times described the album as "career-defining." Writing about "Ukifune" for Metropolis, Daniel Robson noted the song's combination of "a rich Eastern melody with reverb-soaked guitar, powerful distorted bass and a sharp snare sound" and its "primeval Japanese flavor."

In the same year as its release, Tategami was certified gold by the RIAJ. It peaked at number five on the Oricon Albums Chart. "Ukifune" reached number 12, becoming the band's highest ranked single on the Oricon Singles Chart.

== Track listing ==
All lyrics are written by Akiko Hamada; all music is composed by Yumi Nakashima, except where otherwise noted.

No.	Title	Lyrics	Music	Length
1.	"Umashika mono (うましかもの, Stupid Things)"			3:35
2.	"Ukifune (浮舟)"			4:12
3.	"Otona no Kusuri (大人のくすり, Adult Medicine)"			4:13
4.	"Naimono Nedari (ないものねだり, asking for the moon)"			4:48
5.	"Nanashi (ななし, Untitled)"			3:53
6.	"Naifu (ナイフ, Knife)"			3:54
7.	"Ame Nochi Ame Nochi Ame (雨のち雨のち雨, rain then rain then rain)"			4:42
8.	"Mugendai (無限大, Infinity)"			4:07
9.	"Tsuki to Kōra (月と甲羅, The Moon and a Shell)"			4:38
10.	"Poraroido (ポラロイド, Polaroid)"			3:58
11.	"Sandā Gāru (サンダーガール, Thunder Girl)" (Collaboration with The Groovers)	Akiko Hamada, Kazuhiko Fujii	Yu Nakashima, Kazuhiko Fujii	3:24
12.	"Tane (種, Seed)"			4:45

Bonus Track
No.	Title	Length
13.	"Ukifune (Special Version)"	4:56
