= Dasoku Hokō =

Dasoku Hokō 蛇足歩行

Studio album by GO!GO!7188
- Released: 6 December 2000
- Genre: Rock
- Length: 51:19
- Label: Toshiba-EMI

GO!GO!7188 chronology
| Dasoku Hokō 蛇足歩行 (2000) | Gyotaku (2001) |

Singles from Dasoku Hokō
- 1. "Taiyō" Released: 28 June 2000; 2. "Jet Ninjin" Released: 30 August 2000; 3. "Koi no Uta" Released: 25 October 2000

Dasoku Hokō (蛇足歩行) is the debut album by GO!GO!7188, released in 2000. The band has stated that the title, literally translated as "useless walking," has no meaning behind it. The album cover features a dekotora.

In 2023, Japanese rock band Shishamo covered the album's third single, "Koi no Uta", on the NHK program The Covers. The single was covered again, in 2024, by Sumire Uesaka, as the ending theme of the tenth episode of the anime adaptation of Alya Sometimes Hides Her Feelings in Russian. "Koi no Uta" was certified double platinum by the Recording Industry Association of Japan in 2019.

The album was reissued in 2012 as part of EMI Music Japan's EMI Rocks The First series. To celebrate the 25th anniversary of GO!GO!7188's debut, the album was released on vinyl for the first time on September 24, 2025. This edition included not only the original tracklist but also songs from its associated singles as bonus tracks.

== Reception ==
Dasoku Hokō was reviewed positively by OngakuDB, with the website stating that GO!GO!7188 demonstrated that they truly were creative musicians. The Japan Times called it "a strong debut album". The album charted at number 25 on the Oricon Albums Chart, where it stayed for nine weeks.

== Track listing ==
All lyrics are written by Akiko Hamada; all music is composed by Yumi Nakashima, except where otherwise noted.

CD
| No. | Title | Music | Length |
|---|---|---|---|
| 1. | "Jet Ninjin (ジェットにんぢん, Jet Carrot)" | | 3:29 |
| 2. | "Yuge (ゆげ, Vapor)" | | 3:34 |
| 3. | "Yukue Fumei (行方不明, Missing Person)" | | 4:11 |
| 4. | "Taiyō (太陽, Sun)" | | 5:23 |
| 5. | "Kanojo to Watashi (彼女と私, Her and Me)" | | 4:22 |
| 6. | "Koi no Uta (こいのうた, Love Song)" | | 6:07 |
| 7. | "Seibu (西部, The West)" | | 4:52 |
| 8. | "Nukarumi (ぬかるみ, Mud)" | | 6:41 |
| 9. | "Rokku (ロック, Rock)" | | 5:07 |
| 10. | "Panku (パンク, Punk)" | | 5:50 |
| 11. | "Koganemushi -Karē Raisu- (こがねむし-カレーライス-, Scarab -Curry Rice-)" (instrumental) | GO!GO!7188 | 2:51 |
