= Tategami =

Tategami is a Japanese word that may refer to:

Standing hair (鬣), mane

- full head of hair on a young samurai
- Tategami (GO!GO!7188 album)

Standing paper (立紙);

- Tategami, vertical paper orders used during the time of Hideyoshi time for general statutes, contrasting with the style of horizontally folded origami orders, and kirigami

Standing gods (立神)

- Tategami dry dock and piers (立神港区) of Sasebo, Nagasaki
- Tategami Shrine in Arida, Wakayama (ja:立神社 (有田市))
