= Toyota Municipal Museum of Art =

Coordinates: 35°04′48.58″N 137°09′06.49″E

- 豊田市美術館
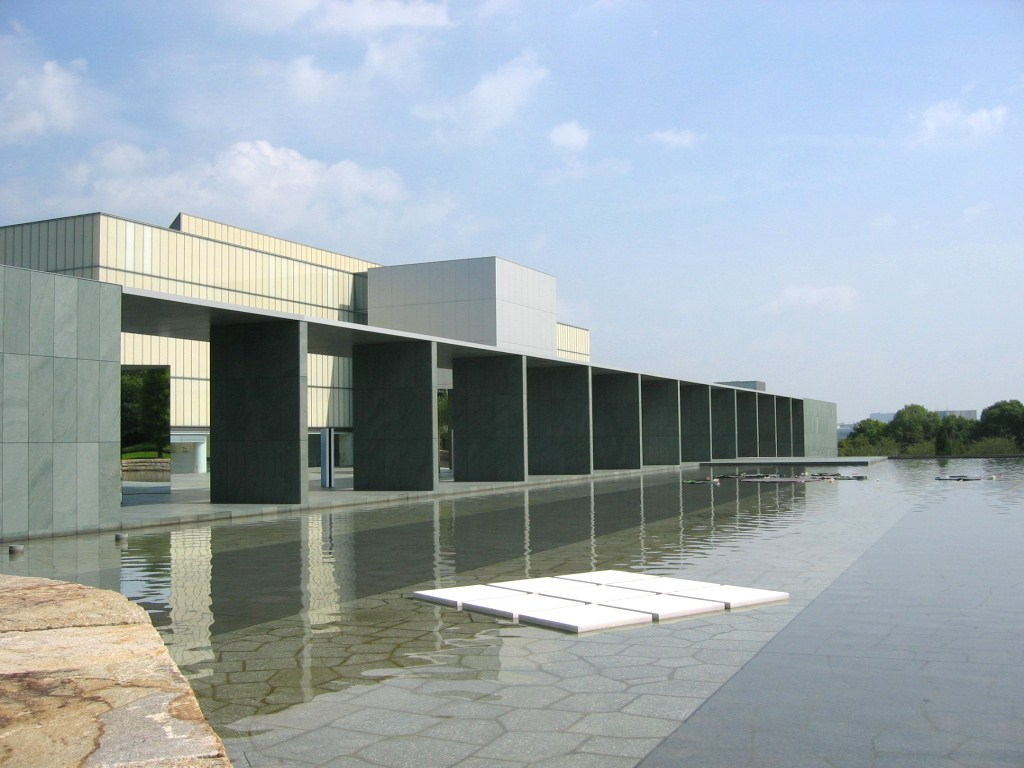
- Established: 1995
- Location: Toyota, Aichi, Japan
- Type: Art museum
- Architect: Yoshio Taniguchi
- Public transit access: Toyotashi Station
- Website: www.museum.toyota.aichi.jp

The Toyota Municipal Museum of Art (豊田市美術館, Toyota-shi Bijutsukan) is an art museum located in the city of Toyota, Aichi Prefecture, Japan.

== History and collection ==
The Toyota Municipal Museum of Art opened in 1995. The museum building was designed by Yoshio Taniguchi while the landscape was designed by Peter Walker. It cost $122 million to build and was entirely paid for by Toyota city. Standing by the entrance to the museum are a simple cubic sculpture by Sol Lewitt and a sculpture of rusted, curved steel plates by Richard Serra.

To commemorate the museum's 20th anniversary, it was renovated in 2015, under supervision from Taniguchi.

The museum "aims to create a collection that provides an overview of art after modernism, both from Japan and other countries". The collection of European modern art include works by Gustav Klimt, Egon Schiele, Oskar Kokoschka, Rene Magritte, Max Ernst, Jean Arp, Salvador Dali, Constantine Brâncuşi, and Alberto Giacometti. The collection of Japanese modern art includes works by Shunso Hishida, Taikan Yokoyama, Kanzan Shimomura Shiko Imamura, Mifune Hayami, Yukihiko Yasuda, Hako Irie, Ryusei Kishida, and Toji Fujita.

Artists who have exhibited include Leiko Ikemura.

Public transport is with the Mikawa Line to Toyotashi Station.
