= Chiyo Okumura =

Japanese singer

Chiyo Okumura 奥村チヨ
- Born: Chiyo Okumura (奥村智代); February 18, 1947 (age 78); Ikeda, Osaka, Japan
- Genres: Kayōkyoku
- Occupations: Singer; fashion model
- Years active: 1965–2018
- Labels: Toshiba; Victor; Warner; Nippon Columbia; Teichiku

Chiyo Okumura (奥村チヨ, Okumura Chiyo; February 18, 1947, Ikeda, Osaka) is a popular Japanese pop singer and former fashion model who made her debut in the 1960s.

She is best known for her songs "Koi no Dorei" (恋の奴隷 English: "Slave of Love") and "Shuuchakueki" (終着駅 English: "Terminal Station"). Her cover of The Ventures recording, "Hokkaido Skies" sold over one million copies, and earned her a gold disc award. Following this success, she released another hit, "Ginza Lights."

"Koi no Dorei" was covered on GO!GO!7188's cover album, Tora no Ana.

On January 6, 2018, Okumura announced her retirement from the music industry.

== Discography ==
=== Studio albums ===
1. [1967.11.05] Kitaguni no Aoi Sora -Okumura Chiyo Hit Parade-
2. [1968.11.01] Chiyo to Anata no Yoru
3. [1969.06.01] Anata to Chiyo to...
4. [1969.12.01] Anata Konomi no... Chiyo
5. [1970.06.05] Kuyashīkeredo Shiawase yo
6. [1971.06.05] Amai Seikatsu
7. [1971.11.05] Chiyo no Ozashiki Uta
8. [1972.05.05] Betsuri no Sanbika
9. [1972.10.20] Hi no Ataru Basho
10. [1973.05.20] Hikishio
11. [1973.12.01] Kaze no Bojō
12. [1974.08.05] Nanika Arisona Nishi Ginza
13. [1980.11.21] Okumura Chiyo
14. [1988.04.25] PRESENT -Genzai-

=== Live albums ===
1. [1970.10.05] Night Club no Okumura Chiyo

=== Singles ===
1. [1965.03.05] "Anata ga Inakutemo"
2. [1965.06.05] "Aa Kekkon"
3. [1965.07.15] "September Moon"
4. [1965.10.05] "Gomen ne Jirō"
5. [1965.11.05] "Jingle Bells"
6. [1966.01.05] "Omoide no Tango"
7. [1966.03.05] "Hitoribocchi de"
8. [1966.05.05] "Ienakatta no"
9. [1966.08.05] "Watashi no Mune o Knock Shite"
10. [1966.11.05] "Itsuka no Yakusoku"
11. [1967.08.05] "Kitaguni no Aoi Sora"
12. [1967.12.01] "Anata ni Aitai"
13. [1968.02.01] "Namida Iro no Koi"
14. [1968.06.01] "Aoi Tsukiyo"
15. [1968.11.01] "Hana ni Naritai"
16. [1969.03.01] "Yoru Yoso no Mama de"
17. [1969.06.01] "Koi no Dorei"
18. [1969.10.01] "Koi Dorobō"
19. [1970.02.05] "Koi Kurui"
20. [1970.05.05] "Kuyashīkeredo Shiawase yo"
21. [1970.09.05] "Usodemo Īkara"
22. [1970.12.01] "Chūtohanpa wa Yamete"
23. [1971.04.05] "Amai Seikatsu"
24. [1971.08.05] "Kawa no Nagare no Yōni"
25. [1971.12.25] "Shūchakueki"
26. [1972.04.25] "Betsuri no Sanbika"
27. [1972.08.25] "Hi no Ataru Basho"
28. [1972.12.20] "Onna no Koi Uta"
29. [1973.04.20] "Hikishio"
30. [1973.09.20] "Kaze no Bojō"
31. [1973.12.25] "Naite Kyōto e"
32. [1974.06.05] "Nanika Arisona Nishi Ginza"
33. [1977.10.05] "Sōmatō"
34. [1978.05.05] "Onna Uta"
35. [1980.04.21] "Semete sayonara wa…"
36. [1981.11.28] "Moi (Moa)"
37. [1983.02.25] "Ashita Suteru kara"
38. [1983.05.25] "Naze"
39. [1984.06.25] "Wakarete Ageru"
40. [1986.04.21] "Wasurenaide"
41. [1988.02.21] "Kage"
42. [1994.05.21] "Gaitō"
43. [1995.05.05] "Koi no Dorei '95"
44. [1995.05.05] "Shūchakueki '95"
45. [1999.05.19] "Parōre Parōre"
46. [2001.11.21] "TOKIO Tenshi" (duet with Ouyang Fei Fei)
47. [2003.06.25] "Sugao no Mama no Anata de"
48. [2004.08.25] "Aishite Aishite Aishichatta no yo"
49. [2016.11.23] "Be With You -Anata ni Aeta-

== Kōhaku Uta Gassen Appearances ==
Year	#	Song	No.	VS
1969 (Showa 44)/20th	1	Koi Dorobo (恋泥棒)	6/23	THE KINGTONES
1970 (Showa 45)/21st	2	Usodemoiikara (嘘でもいいから)	20/24	Four Leaves
1972 (Showa 47)/23rd	3	Shūchakueki (終着駅)	5/23	Tsuruokamasayoshitotoukyou Romanchika
