= Fairy Tail season 3 =

Fairy Tail
- Season 3
- No. of episodes: 51

Release
- Original network: TV Tokyo
- Original release: October 7, 2018 – September 29, 2019

Season chronology
- ← Previous; Season 2

The third and final season of the Fairy Tail anime television series was directed by Shinji Ishihira and produced by A-1 Pictures and CloverWorks. Like the rest of the series, it follows the adventures of Natsu Dragneel and Lucy Heartfilia of the fictional guild Fairy Tail. This season contains two story arcs: the first seven episodes continue the "Avatar" arc (アヴァタール編, Avatāru-hen), which adapts material from the final chapter of the 49th volume to the second-to-last chapter of the 51st volume of the manga series Fairy Tail by Hiro Mashima, depicting Natsu, Lucy, and Happy's journey to reorganize their disbanded guild; the remaining 44 episodes form the "Alvarez" arc (アルバレス編, Arubaresu-hen), which adapts material from the last chapter of the 51st volume to the manga's conclusion, depicting the guild's war with the militaristic Alvarez Empire, and Natsu's final battle with his adversaries Zeref and Acnologia.

On July 20, 2017, Hiro Mashima announced on Twitter that a third and "final" series of Fairy Tail would air in 2018. It premiered on October 7, 2018, on TV Tokyo and its affiliates, and was simultaneously released by Funimation with a broadcast dub in North America.

The season contains eight pieces of theme music: four opening themes and four ending themes. For episodes 278 to 290, the first opening theme is "Power of the Dream", performed by lol, and the ending theme is "Endless Harmony", performed by Beverly. For episodes 291 to 303, the second opening and ending themes are "Down by Law", performed by The Rampage from Exile Tribe and "Pierce", performed by Empire, respectively. For episodes 304 to 315, the third opening and ending themes are "No-Limit", performed by Ōsaka ☆ Shunkashūtō, and "Boku to Kimi no Lullaby", performed by Miyuna. The fourth opening and ending themes, used for the remainder of the season, are "More Than Like", performed by Bish, and "Exceed", performed by Miyuu. "Snow Fairy", performed by Funkist, is used in the final episode as an insert song.

== Episodes ==
No. overall	No. in season	Title	Directed by	Written by	Chief animation directed by	Original release date
Avatar Arc
278	1	"The Lamia Scale Thanksgiving Festival"; Transliteration: "Ramia Sukeiru Kanshasai" (Japanese: 蛇姫の鱗(ラミアスケイル)感謝祭)	Directed by : Naoto Hashimoto; Storyboarded by : Shinji Ishihira	Masashi Sogo	Akihiko Sano	October 7, 2018
Natsu Dragneel, Lucy Heartfilia, and Happy travel to the city of Marguerite to visit Lamia Scale, which now includes Wendy Marvell and Carla. Wendy declines the trio's invitation to help reorganize Fairy Tail, thinking that leaving Lamia Scale would upset her friend and current partner Shelia Blendi, but is admonished by Shelia for staying out of pity. That evening, the city is invaded by a horde of 100,000 monsters commanded by Orochi Fin, a rival guild to Lamia Scale. Taking Happy over Natsu's objections, Shelia flies off to help Wendy defeat the wizard controlling the monsters. In his anger, Natsu stampedes through the advancing horde in pursuit of Shelia and Happy.
279	2	"Because of Love"; Transliteration: "Aishiteru kara" (Japanese: 愛してるから)	Yūshi Suzuki	Shōji Yonemura	Yūki Morimoto	October 14, 2018
Wendy, Shelia, Carla, and Happy battle Orochi Fin, but are quickly trapped under a gravity field created by Orochi Fin's recruit, former Grimoire Heart subcommander Bluenote Stinger. Unaffected by the gravity, Natsu catches up to his friends and effortlessly defeats Bluenote with a single attack, which shocks the rest of Orochi Fin into surrendering. After assuring Wendy of her own self-reliance, Shelia convinces her to rejoin Natsu's group together with Carla. The group set off for a deserted and rainy village where a devastated Juvia Loxar resides.
280	3	"Avatar"; Transliteration: "Avatāru" (Japanese: 黒魔術教団(アヴァタール))	Ayaka Tsujihashi	Fumihiko Shimo	Hatsue Nakayama	October 21, 2018
Natsu's group find Juvia ill-stricken from the rain at the deserted village, where she has lived with Gray Fullbuster until his disappearance six months earlier. When Juvia recalls a pattern of black markings that appeared on Gray's body before he left, Natsu remembers the warning from Rogue Cheney's future self that Gray is supposed to kill Frosch around this time. Natsu visits Sabertooth with Lucy and Happy to prevent Rogue and Frosch from undertaking a mission to destroy Avatar, a cult of Zeref's worshipers that Natsu correctly surmises Gray has joined. Meanwhile, Avatar's members suspect Gray of spying on them for the Magic Council, but he says that destroying the Book of E.N.D. is all that concerns him anymore, which convinces the cultists that he has been corrupted by his Demon Slayer magic. Elsewhere, the Council's custody enforcement unit, captained by Gajeel Redfox, discovers Gray's affiliation with Avatar and prepares to apprehend him with the rest of the cult.
281	4	"Underground Clash"; Transliteration: "Chika no Gekitō" (Japanese: 地下の激闘)	Directed by : Tomoya Takayama; Storyboarded by : Shinji Ishihira	Atsuhiro Tomioka	Akihiko Sano	October 28, 2018
Natsu, Lucy, and Happy use Virgo's tunneling magic to infiltrate Avatar's base. When Natsu alerts Avatar to their presence by calling out to Gray, they encounter three of the cult's elite black wizards, whom Natsu quickly defeats before Gray arrives and attacks him. Natsu implores Gray to rejoin Fairy Tail, thinking he is possessed, but Gray refuses and says that he has joined Avatar of his own volition. The cultists capture the trio before leaving to carry out their "purification" plan, which involves a ritualistic massacre of innocents in an attempt to summon Zeref. One of the cultists, Gomon, stays behind to torture and interrogate the trio, but Gray freezes him and releases his friends, revealing that he has been secretly working undercover together with Erza Scarlet.
282	5	"The Purification Plan"; Transliteration: "Jōka Sakusen" (Japanese: 浄化作戦)	Kazunobu Shimizu	Shōji Yonemura	Isamu Fukushima	November 4, 2018
After Gray and Erza explain the reasons for their espionage to their friends, including Gray's extended absence from Juvia, the five wizards intercept Avatar's entire congregation at the town of Malva to keep the cultists from massacring its citizens. Lucy, Gray and Erza each demonstrate their own improved magical skills by overpowering many of Avatar's soldiers and elites, while Wendy and Carla return to assist their friends, reuniting a healed Juvia with Gray as well. Natsu eventually reaches Avatar's high priest and leader, Arlock, who has anticipated these events and says that the "purification" ritual will begin with the arrival of a being called Ikusatsunagi.
283	6	"Ikusatsunagi" (Japanese: イクサツナギ)	Directed by : Akira Shimizu; Storyboarded by : Shinji Ishihira	Fumihiko Shimo	Hatsue Nakayama	November 11, 2018
After being defeated by Natsu, Arlock summons the colossal war god Ikusatsunagi to attack his own followers, whom he reveals to be the intended sacrifices for his ritual instead of the townspeople. An enraged Natsu climbs onto Ikusatsunagi's head and uses his Fire Dragon King's Destruction Fist to destroy the god. Gajeel's squad then arrives and captures the cultists after following directions left behind by Gray at Avatar's base. While the Fairy Tail wizards celebrate their reunion and victory, Rogue arrives with Frosch to investigate, despite Natsu's instructions. When Gray cuddles Frosch, Natsu is assured that Frosch's prophesied death has been avoided.
284	7	"Memoirs"; Transliteration: "Kaisōroku" (Japanese: 回想録)	Directed by : Hiroshi Akiyama; Storyboarded by : Shinji Ishihira	Masashi Sogo	Yūki Morimoto	November 18, 2018
In a flashback to over 400 years earlier, a young Zeref Dragneel studies at Mildian Academy in search of a way to resurrect his dead brother, Natsu. The school board eventually expel Zeref out of fear that his forbidden research will anger the god of life and death, Ankhselam. When Zeref still refuses to accept Natsu's death, Ankhselam afflicts him with the curse of contradiction, which kills everyone else in the academy and makes Zeref immortal. Consumed with guilt and self-loathing over his actions, Zeref creates the Etherious to assist in his suicide, using Natsu's preserved body to complete E.N.D., his final demon. Back in the present, Zeref meets with the human form of Acnologia, whom he challenges to a battle between themselves and humanity. Meanwhile, Lucy and her friends return to Magnolia, where Lucy worries that the other guildmates she has contacted have moved on with their lives. To her delight, she sees them all gathered at the ruins of Fairy Tail's guildhall, where Natsu announces Fairy Tail's revival.
Alvarez Arc
285	8	"The 7th Guild Master"; Transliteration: "Nanadaime Girudo Masutā" (Japanese: 七代目ギルドマスター)	Directed by : Yūshi Suzuki; Storyboarded by : Shinji Ishihira	Atsuhiro Tomioka	Akihiko Sano	November 25, 2018
During the reconstruction of Fairy Tail's guildhall, Levy McGarden registers Erza as the guild's seventh master to substitute for Makarov Dreyar, who has been missing for the past year. Mest Gryder arrives and reveals Lumen Histoire to Erza and her eavesdropping friends, explaining that Makarov disbanded the guild to protect them from the Alvarez Empire, a military superpower on the western continent of Alakitasia that intends to obtain Lumen Histoire by invading Ishgar. Reasoning that Makarov has been taken hostage during his attempt to negotiate peace with Alvarez, the group prepare to infiltrate the empire and rescue him by themselves. Gajeel overhears them and organizes his own team to recruit Laxus Dreyar.
286	9	"Law of Space"; Transliteration: "Kūkan no Okite" (Japanese: 空間の掟)	Fumio Itō	Atsuhiro Tomioka	Isamu Fukushima	December 2, 2018
While receiving the Magic Council's approval for Fairy Tail's revival, Levy learns from the councilors that the strongest of Ishgar's Ten Wizard Saints, God Serena, has defected to join Alvarez's Spriggan 12, which consist of eleven other wizards of similar strength. Horrified, Levy joins Gajeel and his team's search for Laxus to support Natsu's team, advising them against battling the Spriggan 12. Meanwhile, Natsu's team stop at Caracol Island to rendezvous with a secret informant while disguised as members of Cait Shelter, only to break cover to stop Alvarez soldiers from killing a child. The wizards unwittingly attract the attention of Alvarez officer Marin Hollow, who uses his special magic to negate Lucy, Erza, and Mest's magic and attack the others before being stopped by Brandish μ, his superior officer and one of the Spriggan 12.
287	10	"Emperor Spriggan"; Transliteration: "Kōtei Supurigan" (Japanese: 皇帝スプリガン)	Directed by : Tomoya Takayama; Storyboarded by : Shinji Ishihira	Fumihiko Shimo	Hatsue Nakayama	December 9, 2018
Gajeel's team visit a hot spring owned by Blue Pegasus, where Ichiya Vandalay Kotobuki reveals that Laxus and the Thunder Legion have joined his guild, ruining Gajeel's surprise for the others. Meanwhile, Brandish demonstrates her tremendous power by expanding and then shrinking Caracol Island's landmass as a warning to Natsu's team, informing them of Makarov's safety. Mest transports the group to an underwater submarine piloted by their informant from Crime Sorcière, former Oración Seis member Sorano Aguria, who takes them to Makarov's location. In the imperial capital of Vistarion, Makarov witnesses the return of Alvarez's ruler, Emperor Spriggan, whom he discovers to be Zeref. After revealing his knowledge of Lumen Histoire's real name, Fairy Heart, Zeref attempts to kill Makarov to provoke Natsu's anger, but Mest rescues Makarov and reunites him with Natsu's team.
288	11	"To the God-Forsaken Land"; Transliteration: "Kami ni Misuterareta Chi e" (Japanese: 神に見捨てられた地へ)	Ayaka Tsujihashi	Shōji Yonemura	Yūki Morimoto	December 16, 2018
Natsu and his team's reunion with Makarov is interrupted by the arrival of Ajeel Raml, one of the Spriggan 12. The Fairy Tail wizards flee on a magic-powered carriage, but Ajeel gives pursuit on a colossal golem made of sand and eventually traps them in a giant sand pit. Makarov tries protecting them from Ajeel's deadly sand magic until Laxus arrives aboard Blue Pegasus's Christina airship. Mest teleports the entire group onto the ship before Laxus retaliates against Ajeel with an explosion of lightning, but Ajeel is protected by a barrier conjured by August, the strongest of the Spriggan 12. Returning to Fairy Tail's finished guildhall, Makarov is reinstated as master and apologizes for fruitlessly disbanding the guild. In preparation of Alvarez's invasion, Mavis Vermillion decides to tell the guild the origins of Fairy Heart and her relationship with Zeref.
289	12	"Mavis and Zeref"; Transliteration: "Meibisu to Zerefu" (Japanese: メイビスとゼレフ)	Directed by : Kazuki Yokouchi; Storyboarded by : Shinji Ishihira	Masashi Sogo	Akihiko Sano	December 23, 2018
In X686, Mavis learns the unperfected black magic spell Law from Zeref, which she later uses to save her friends' lives at the cost of her physical growth. She re-encounters Zeref ten years later after she and the rest of Fairy Tail have participated in a four-year-long war. Zeref discovers that she has been inflicted with Ankhselam's curse for using Law, reasoning that Mavis's tactical command during the war has offset her life-stealing powers by dulling her respect for life. Mavis denies Zeref's statements out of disgust, only to later realize the truth when she unintentionally kills Makarov's mother on the day of his birth, causing Mavis to exile herself from the guild. When Zeref finds Mavis again one year later, she empathizes with his cursed state and proposes that they lift their shared curse together. The two fall in love and kiss, but as a result, Zeref's curse kills Mavis despite her immortality.
290	13	"Fairy Heart"; Transliteration: "Fearī Hāto" (Japanese: 妖精の心臓(フェアリーハート))	Directed by : Fumio Itō; Storyboarded by : Shinji Ishihira	Masashi Sogo	Hatsue Nakayama	January 6, 2019
In X697, Zeref returns Mavis's body to Fairy Tail's acting guild master, Precht Gaebolg. Sensing that Mavis is in a state between life and death, Precht puts her in stasis beneath the guildhall and attempts to revive her, eventually discovering her curse and keeping it a secret from the guild by falsifying her death. After thirty years, Precht's continued revival efforts produce Fairy Heart, a source of limitless magic power. Back in the present, Mavis surmises that Zeref intends to use Fairy Heart to defeat Acnologia, making himself an unstoppable force. Natsu reveals he has obtained a secret technique from his year-long training that he believes will defeat Zeref, who simultaneously assembles the Spriggan 12 for war. Meanwhile, Acnologia decides to participate in the oncoming battle.
291	14	"The Magnolia Defensive War"; Transliteration: "Magunoria Hōeisen" (Japanese: マグノリア防衛戦)	Kazunobu Shimizu	Atsuhiro Tomioka	Isamu Fukushima	January 13, 2019
After Magnolia is evacuated for Alvarez's invasion, the city is struck by a surprise western attack from an armada of imperial airships commanded by Ajeel. Fried Justine maintains a barrier that protects the city, allowing Bisca Moulin to fire on the armada with the guild's Jupiter cannon, but Ajeel effortlessly disperses the attack. When Natsu, Gajeel, and Wendy's counterattack against Ajeel fails because of their motion sickness aboard his airship, Erza arrives to duel him, sending the Dragon Slayers to battle his ground forces. Meanwhile, Spriggan 12 member Wall Eehto breaches Fried's barrier, while Lucy discovers Brandish and a shrunken Marin in her bathroom. As Fairy Tail's other members assess the presence of three Spriggan 12 members within the city, they detect three larger factions of Alvarez's army approaching from all other directions, each accompanied by three of the remaining Spriggan 12.
292	15	"Morning Star"; Transliteration: "Myōjō" (Japanese: 明星)	Directed by : Naoto Hashimoto; Storyboarded by : Akihiko Sano	Fumihiko Shimo	Akihiko Sano	January 20, 2019
Fairy Tail continues to battle Alvarez's forces that have infiltrated Magnolia. Meanwhile, Brandish finds Lucy familiar and threatens her into sharing a bath to discover her identity. Upon realizing that Lucy is Layla Heartfilia's daughter, Brandish shrinks the building and attempts to kill her as she flees. After being rescued by Cana Alberona, Lucy incapacitates Marin to fight Brandish, unknowingly stopping Marin from negating Erza's magic during her own duel with Ajeel. When Erza deduces Ajeel's weakness to water and wind magic, Ajeel resorts to conjuring a sandstorm that engulfs the city. Overwhelmed, Erza uses her Morning Star armor to create a beacon that helps Bisca fire Jupiter at Ajeel through the storm, which results in his defeat.
293	16	"For Whom the Parfum Flows"; Transliteration: "Sono Parufamu wa Ta ga Tame ni" (Japanese: その香り(パルファム)は誰がために)	Directed by : Tomoya Takayama; Storyboarded by : Shinji Ishihira	Shōji Yonemura	Yūki Morimoto	January 27, 2019
Brandish contracts a pollen allergy from Ajeel's sandstorm, allowing Cana to defeat her. Meanwhile, Wall targets Fried to completely dispel his barrier, creating an army of robotic soldiers tailored to the weaknesses of Fairy Tail's other members. Ichiya arrives to help the Thunder Legion fight the mechanical Wall, who absorbs Ichiya's electric attacks to assume a more powerful form. After Alvarez's surrounding armada and Wall's soldiers are defeated, Fried drops the barrier and destroys Wall's body alongside Ichiya. Wall's head explodes and injures the Thunder Legion when they protect Ichiya from the explosion, revealing the robot to be a puppet remotely controlled by the real Wall from Alvarez's southern advancement. Wall fires on Fairy Tail's guildhall with a long-range magic cannon, but Ichiya uses the Christina to block the attack before contacting the other wizard guilds in Fiore, beckoning them to join the war against Alvarez.
294	17	"Natsu vs. Zeref"; Transliteration: "Natsu bāsasu Zerefu" (Japanese: ナツ vs. ゼレフ)	Yūshi Suzuki	Atsuhiro Tomioka	Hatsue Nakayama	February 3, 2019
With Alvarez's vanguard defeated and Brandish imprisoned, the guilds of Fiore hold back the advancing armies. Mavis sends several members to reinforce their allies in the northern and southern fronts, while the Four Emperors of Ishgar defend the eastern side. Suddenly, the guild detects Natsu flying with Happy towards the western army led by Zeref to defeat them by himself. After drawing Zeref out by defeating several hundred soldiers, Natsu overpowers him with his ultimate technique, Fire Dragon King Mode, a temporary reserve of magic power left behind by Igneel. Convinced that Natsu has found the means of killing him, Zeref thanks him and several others as he awaits his death.
295	18	"Across 400 Years"; Transliteration: "Yonhyaku-nen no Toki o Koe" (Japanese: 400年の時を超え)	Directed by : Hiroshi Akiyama; Storyboarded by : Shinji Ishihira	Shōji Yonemura	Yūki Morimoto	February 10, 2019
Having survived Natsu's attack, Zeref reveals both his and Natsu's identities as Natsu's brother and E.N.D., respectively; he further reveals that Natsu, Gajeel, Wendy, Rogue, and Sting Eucliffe were sent over 400 years from the past through the Eclipse gate by Lucy's ancestor Anna and Layla as part of the dragons' plan to kill Acnologia. Natsu is skeptical and prepares to kill Zeref, but is stopped by Happy when Zeref warns that Natsu's life is tied to his own, which would result in Natsu dying along with Zeref. After Natsu and Happy retreat, Zeref accepts his own immortality and fully commits himself to his invasion. Meanwhile, Fairy Tail's allies encounter several of the Spriggan 12, with Mermaid Heel and Lamia Scale fighting to free Hargeon from the members Wall, Dimaria Yesta, and Neinhart. In Magnolia, Marin infiltrates Fairy Tail and chokes Brandish for her cruelty towards him. While returning to the guild, Happy discovers that Natsu has fainted.
296	19	"What I Want to Do"; Transliteration: "Atashi no Shitai Koto" (Japanese: あたしのしたい事)	Fumio Itō	Fumihiko Shimo	Akihiko Sano	February 17, 2019
After being saved from Marin by Lucy and Cana, Brandish reveals herself as the daughter of Layla's servant Grammi, whom she presumes Layla killed over possession of Aquarius's key. When Brandish tries killing Lucy again to avenge Grammi, Lucy is rescued by Aquarius, who has gained a new key in an unknown location to replace her broken one, temporarily reuniting with Lucy. Aquarius takes the wizards to her memory of their mothers' past, where they watch Grammi inadvertently causing Layla to sacrifice herself to open Eclipse without Aquarius's key, resulting in Zoldio killing Grammi. Happy arrives with the catatonic Natsu, whom Porlyusica diagnoses with a malignant tumor caused by his overexertion of magic. Learning that the tumor cannot be removed, Brandish helps Natsu by shrinking it instead. As Aquarius returns to the celestial world, Lucy promises to find her key after the war. Meanwhile, Fairy Tail's allies struggle against the Spriggan 12, with God Serena single-handedly overpowering the Four Emperors.
297	20	"Not Until the Battle Is Over"; Transliteration: "Tatakai ga Owaru made wa" (Japanese: 戦いが終わるまでは)	Directed by : Shinichi Fukumoto; Storyboarded by : Shinji Ishihira	Masashi Sogo	Isamu Fukushima	February 24, 2019
The Four Emperors retaliate against God Serena, who reveals himself to be a Dragon Slayer with multiple elemental powers and defeats the four wizards. Acnologia arrives in a hunt for Dragon Slayers and effortlessly kills God Serena, ignoring the other wizards. Meanwhile, Erza and her team – Gray, Juvia, Wendy, Carla, and Laxus – join Mermaid Heel and Lamia Scale's battle to liberate Hargeon. Wendy and Carla team up with Shelia to battle Dimaria, while Laxus duels Wall to avenge the Thunder Legion, despite being contaminated with Tempester's health-threatening Bane Particles. Outmatched, Wall adopts a more serious personality and enters his Assault Mode at the same time that Laxus suffers a physical breakdown from his condition, quickly leaving Laxus unable to fight back.
298	21	"In a Silent Time"; Transliteration: "Shizuka naru Toki no Naka de" (Japanese: 静かなる時の中で)	Ayaka Tsujihashi	Atsuhiro Tomioka	Hatsue Nakayama & Akihiko Sano	March 3, 2019
Laxus tricks Wall into a dispelling an enchantment circle that he has secretly drawn around them during their battle, which eradicates Laxus's Bane Particles and allows him to conjure red lightning that destroys Wall. In Hargeon, Jellal Fernandes and Meldy arrive to lend their support against Alvarez, which frustrates Kagura Mikazuchi. Dimaria stops time with her Age Seal magic to toy with Wendy, Shelia, and Carla, but the three are able to move under the power of Ultear Milkovich, who appears as a projection within the temporal rift as a side effect of her own Last Ages spell. Enraged, Dimaria uses her God Soul magic to assume the form of Chronos, the god of time. Carla is fatally wounded protecting Wendy from Dimaria, forcing Ultear to eject her from the rift to stall her death. Ultear offers to help Wendy and Shelia defeat Dimaria and save Carla by enhancing their magic with the power of Third Origin, which she warns will permanently cost them their ability to use magic again.
299	22	"Natsu, Revived!!"; Transliteration: "Fukkatsu no Natsu!!" (Japanese: 復活のナツ!!)	Kazunobu Shimizu	Shōji Yonemura	Yūki Morimoto	March 10, 2019
Wendy agrees to undergo Ultear's Third Origin spell to protect Shelia, but Shelia persuades Ultear to let her take Wendy's place, using the last of her God Slayer magic to defeat Dimaria, and allowing Wendy to heal Carla. Meanwhile, assassin and Spriggan 12 member Jacob Lessio enters Fairy Tail's guildhall and transports its members to another dimension. Capable of seeing Mavis's normally invisible spirit, Jacob interrogates her over her body's location by magically torturing her. Lucy and Happy interrupt him, having been protected by Horologium from Jacob's transportation spell together with Natsu, who recovers from his coma to help his friends battle Jacob. Jacob resorts to turning Lucy's clothes invisible and forcing an unfazed Natsu to watch, which backfires when Jacob shuts his own eyes to avoid looking at her, allowing them to counterattack. Witnessing this, Mavis discovers a method to defeat Zeref.
300	23	"Historia of Corpses"; Transliteration: "Shikabane no Hisutoria" (Japanese: 屍のヒストリア)	Directed by : Akira Shimizu; Storyboarded by : Shinji Ishihira	Masashi Sogo	Isamu Fukushima, Akihiko Sano & Hatsue Nakayama	March 17, 2019
Furious over his humiliation by Natsu and Lucy, Jacob threatens to kill their guildmates within his pocket dimension until Lucy tells him that he has unknowingly captured Brandish and Marin as well. When Jacob releases the two, Lucy summons Gemini to copy Marin's magic and free her guildmates. After Natsu uses his Fire Dragon King Mode to defeat Jacob, Mavis instructs Cana to release her body from its stasis by using Fairy Glitter to destroy her illusory form. In northern Fiore, Gajeel's team discovers that Sabertooth and Blue Pegasus have been defeated and crucified by the Alvarez army. In Hargeon, Erza, Jellal, and Kagura encounter a facsimile of the deceased Simon called a Historia, created by Neinhart to torment the trio. After sending Jellal and Kagura into the ocean, Neinhart creates Historias of powerful dead figures from Erza and her allies' pasts to fight them. Kagura contemplates leaving Jellal to die for killing Simon, but abandons her resentment and resuscitates him.
301	24	"Mettle"; Transliteration: "Kihaku" (Japanese: 気魄)	Directed by : Tomoya Takayama; Storyboarded by : Shinji Ishihira	Fumihiko Shimo	Akihiko Sano	March 24, 2019
Fairy Tail and their allies struggle to defend Hargeon from the Historias of Ur, Zancrow, Keyes, Ezel, and Hades. Meanwhile, Erza is seriously injured while fighting the Historias of Ikaruga, Azuma, and Kyoka at once, but causes them to vanish by terrifying them with her furious glare before falling unconscious, leading Neinhart to suspect a relationship between her and Irene Belserion, one of the Spriggan 12. Jellal eventually defeats Neinhart after Kagura destroys Simon's Historia, while their allies defeat the other Historias and imprison Alvarez's forces. In Magnolia, Brandish warns Fairy Tail against fighting August and Irene, whom she describes as the strongest man and woman of the 12, respectively. Against Mest's objections, Lucy agrees to let Brandish negotiate a ceasefire with August. On the mountain of Zonia in northern Fiore, Irene transforms the snowy landscape into a lush flower field as a display of her power. Undetterred, Gajeel and his team prepare to battle her subordinates to avenge Sabertooth and Blue Pegasus.
302	25	"The Third Seal"; Transliteration: "Dai San no In" (Japanese: 第三の印)	Yūshi Suzuki	Fumihiko Shimo	Hatsue Nakayama	March 31, 2019
Natsu, Lucy, and Happy accompany Brandish to meet August, with Mest following them out of suspicion. Brandish pleads with August to reconsider the war, causing August to accuse her of treason. In Zonia, Sabertooth and Blue Pegasus rejoin the battle after being rescued by Gajeel's team, with the Oración Seis arriving to support them. Gajeel personally battles Bloodman, a member of the Spriggan 12 whose body is composed of Bane Particles, which Gajeel is immune to because of his own iron body. Concerned for Gajeel when he professes a desire to die, Levy joins the battle to save him while wearing a mask to filter out the particles. As Bloodman reveals his ability to use the same powers as Tartaros's Nine Demon Gates, Levy admits that her mask is useless and succumbs to the particles absorbed into her skin.
303	26	"Together, Always"; Transliteration: "Zutto Futari de" (Japanese: ずっと二人で)	Directed by : Hiroshi Akiyama; Storyboarded by : Shinji Ishihira	Masashi Sogo	Yūki Morimoto	April 7, 2019
Gajeel inhales Bloodman's Bane Particles to save Levy, absorbing traces of iron and assuming a new form that allows him to defeat Bloodman. Mortally injured, Bloodman turns himself into a portal to the underworld to kill Gajeel, who confesses his love to Levy before disappearing. Meanwhile, Mest brainwashes Brandish into attempting to kill August shortly after they reach an agreement to spare Fairy Tail, which prompts August to conjure a column of fire that blasts the Fairy Tail wizards away. At the guildhall, Cana destroys Mavis's spirit and releases her body, which regains consciousness. Intending to hasten the war's outcome, Irene duels Acnologia in Zonia before using her Universe One enchantment, reconstructing Fiore.
304	27	"Fairy Tail Zero"; Transliteration: "Fearī Teiru Zero" (Japanese: フェアリーテイル ZERO)	Directed by : Naoto Hashimoto; Storyboarded by : Shinji Ishihira	Shōji Yonemura	Isamu Fukushima	April 14, 2019
Zeref is transported to Fairy Tail's guildhall with Mavis as a result of Universe One, which also sends Acnologia far away from the kingdom and scatters all other ally and enemy forces across the compressed landscape. This coincidentally saves Gajeel, who discovers Mavis's recreated illusion of Zera. The pair telepathically contact Fairy Tail's members to guide them to the guildhall; Yukino Aguria, Lector, and Frosch accompany Elfman Strauss and encounter Sorano, whom Yukino recognizes as her long-lost sister. Meanwhile, Mirajane Strauss battles two of Irene's soldiers, Juliet Sun and Heine Lunasea, whose strength forces her to assume her most powerful Satan Soul form, Mirajane Alegria, which depletes her magic. Juliet and Heine revert to their original forms as inanimate swords upon their defeat, leaving Mirajane shocked as Irene approaches her from behind.
305	28	"White Dragneel"; Transliteration: "Shiroki Doraguniru" (Japanese: 白きドラグニル)	Tomoya Takayama	Atsuhiro Tomioka	Akihiko Sano	April 21, 2019
Irene captures and tortures Mirajane until August orders her to regroup with the rest of the Spriggan 12, piercing Mirajane's heart with a beam of magic; Lisanna Strauss later finds Mirajane alive with her wound shrunken by Brandish. Meanwhile, Sorano pretends to be unfamiliar with Yukino out of guilt for her past crimes, but promises to reunite with her once she has atoned. Elsewhere, Dimaria is found by Larcade Dragneel, one of the 12 and Zeref's "secret weapon" against Acnologia. At the hill where Fairy Tail's guildhall is now located, Invel mentally enslaves Mavis with an ice collar that hinders her intellect. Zeref shows her Alvarez's entire military force that has assembled around the guild, including Historias of God Serena, Wall, and Bloodman. Natsu and his friends arrive and fight through Alvarez's army, but are impeded by God Serena's Historia, whose magic is negated by a returning Gildarts Clive.
306	29	"The Winter Wizard"; Transliteration: "Fuyu no Madōshi" (Japanese: 冬の魔導士)	Fumio Itō	Atsuhiro Tomioka	Hatsue Nakayama	April 28, 2019
Gildarts discovers that God Serena's Historia is weaker than his real counterpart and easily defeats him, while the Strauss siblings, Rogue, and Minerva Orland battle Ajeel, Jacob, and the other Historias. While extracting Fairy Heart from Mavis, Irene is informed by Neinhart that Erza is alive, and orders him to kill her. Meanwhile, Invel uses his wintery magic to freeze Gray's friends and overpower Gray's Ice Make, but Gray gains an advantage with his Demon Slayer magic. Natsu unfreezes himself and the others before he, Lucy, and Happy are abducted by Brandish. Knowing that Natsu is E.N.D., Invel brainwashes Gray and Juvia into fighting each other to the death, intending to corrupt Gray through his Demon Slayer magic and compel him to kill Natsu. Unwilling to harm Gray, Juvia resolves to commit suicide.
307	30	"Gray and Juvia"; Transliteration: "Gurei to Jubia" (Japanese: グレイとジュビア)	Directed by : Tomoe Makino; Storyboarded by : Shinji Ishihira	Masashi Sogo	Yūki Morimoto	May 5, 2019
As they battle each other against their wills, Gray and Juvia resist Invel's control enough to mortally injure themselves simultaneously. Juvia saves Gray's life by using her water magic to perform a blood transfusion. Believing Juvia to be dead, a grief-stricken Gray defeats Invel, unaware as Wendy and Carla revive Juvia. When Gray retains his judgment and refuses Invel's request to kill Natsu, Invel reveals Natsu's identity as E.N.D. to him in another attempt to trigger Gray's corruption. Meanwhile, Brandish tries imploring Natsu, Lucy, and Happy to abandon the battle to save them from the rest of Alvarez's forces, but is shocked when Natsu easily defeats a magically enhanced Neinhart.
308	31	"The Mightiest Demon of the Book of Zeref"; Transliteration: "Zerefu-sho Saikyō no Akuma" (Japanese: ゼレフ書最強の悪魔)	Directed by : Kazuki Yokouchi; Storyboarded by : Akihiko Sano	Shōji Yonemura	Isamu Fukushima	May 12, 2019
Brandish determines Natsu to be a threat and re-enlarges his tumor, declaring her loyalty to Alvarez. Lucy reluctantly fights Brandish to save Natsu, but Dimaria intervenes. Deducing that Brandish is only pretending to fight Lucy seriously, Dimaria severely injures Brandish and kidnaps Natsu and Lucy. At the guild, Mavis is freed from Invel's control and escapes with the help of Mest; she also shares a brief reunion with Zera, who disappears again. Meanwhile, Lucy faints when Dimaria attempts to gouge her eyes out. Upon awakening, Lucy discovers that Natsu has brutally defeated Dimaria. Brandish returns after being treated by Porlyusica, who reveals that Natsu's tumor is actually the trigger to E.N.D.'s awakening. Having assumed a more demonic form, Natsu wanders the battlefield in search of Zeref, but is impeded by Gray.
309	32	"Broken Bonds"; Transliteration: "Kowareta Kizuna o" (Japanese: 壊れた絆を)	Directed by : Tomoya Takayama; Storyboarded by : Shinji Ishihira	Fumihiko Shimo	Akihiko Sano	May 19, 2019
The demonic Natsu and corrupted Gray fight each other irrationally, both overcome with anger over Lucy and Juvia's apparent deaths. Meanwhile, after Mavis returns to bolster Fairy Tail's morale, Irene transforms Alvarez's soldiers into berserk warriors that overwhelm the guild's members. Makarov uses Fairy Law to defeat the army, despite Mavis's warnings that the spell is deadly to its caster when used against so many targets. Makarov's sacrifice decimates most of the army, but leaves Zeref and the remaining members of the Spriggan 12 unharmed. While mourning Makarov's death, Erza notices Natsu and Gray's battle and tearfully intervenes, which returns them to their senses.
310	33	"Pleasure and Pain"; Transliteration: "Kairaku to Kutsū" (Japanese: 快楽と苦痛)	Ayaka Tsujihashi	Atsuhiro Tomioka	Hatsue Nakayama	May 26, 2019
Erza resolves the fight between Natsu and Gray, who return to normal and reunite with Lucy and Juvia before passing out. When Irene attacks the group, Erza and Wendy battle her to allow their friends' escape. Meanwhile, Larcade, who identifies himself as Zeref's son and Natsu's resentful nephew, casts a spell that arouses several people across the battlefield with a nearly fatal overload of pleasure. Kagura saves Yukino from Larcade and resists his spell by biting her own tongue, but Larcade quickly defeats her. After single-handedly defeating Crime Sorcière, August speculates that the only one who can stop Zeref's son is Mavis, the child's mother.
311	34	"Natsu's Mind"; Transliteration: "Natsu no Kokoro" (Japanese: ナツノココロ)	Kazunobu Shimizu	Fumihiko Shimo	Isamu Fukushima	June 2, 2019
Natsu falls into a fatal coma while recovering with his friends. Within his own mind, he meets an illusory, shapeshifting figure who shows him a series of long forgotten memories of his childhood – including his first meetings with Gajeel, Wendy, Sting, and Rogue – before preparing to reveal the truth about the mass inside Natsu's body. Meanwhile, Sting rescues his friends from Larcade, whose light-based attacks have no effect on him. Larcade casts a spell that causes Sting and his friends to become famished, forcing Sting to knock the others unconscious to stop them from devouring each other. After defeating Wall and Bloodman's Historias, Minerva teleports Rogue to Sting, whom he feeds with his own shadow magic, allowing Sting to enter White-Shadow Dragon Mode.
312	35	"Sting, the White Shadow Dragon"; Transliteration: "Hakueiryū no Sutingu" (Japanese: 白影竜のスティング)	Directed by : Shunichi Kato; Storyboarded by : Shinji Ishihira	Masashi Sogo	Yūki Morimoto	June 9, 2019
Sting's White-Shadow Dragon Mode gives him an advantage against Larcade, who counters with a spell that almost puts Sting and the other wizards into a sleep-like death. With the help of Kagura's gravity magic, Sting merges with his own shadow to resist Larcade's spell and defeat him. Meanwhile, during her battle with Erza and Wendy, Irene reveals herself to be Erza's mother. Erza denies having any relationship with Irene, having never known her parents. Irene decides to tell her and Wendy the story of Erza's birth, which she begins by introducing herself as the former queen of the dragons.
313	36	"Dragon Seed"; Transliteration: "Ryū no Tane" (Japanese: 竜の種)	Directed by : Tomoya Takayama; Storyboarded by : Shinji Ishihira	Shōji Yonemura	Akihiko Sano	June 16, 2019
In a flashback to the Dragon King Festival, Irene rules a kingdom where humans and dragons peacefully co-exist against dragons who devour humans. Hoping to gain an advantage in the war, Irene uses her powers of enchantment to create Dragon Slayer magic for humans, which inadvertently turns Acnologia into a dragon and eradicates most of the species. After conceiving Erza, Irene begins changing into a dragon as well, and is subsequently imprisoned and tortured by her paranoid husband. To protect their unborn daughter, Irene magically halts Erza's growth in her womb for years. When her husband threatens Erza, Irene fully transforms and kills him before fleeing into isolation. Centuries later, Zeref discovers Irene and restores her original appearance, but cannot restore her humanity. Driven insane by her inability to adjust to human sensations, Irene attempts to become human again by enchanting her own consciousness onto Erza. Back in the present, Irene reveals that the attempt failed and led her to abandon Erza as a newborn, causing Erza to assert Fairy Tail as her true family.
314	37	"Master Enchant"; Transliteration: "Masutā Enchanto" (Japanese: 極限付加術(マスターエンチャント))	Yūshi Suzuki	Fumihiko Shimo	Hatsue Nakayama	June 23, 2019
Assuming Igneel's form, Natsu's mental guide reveals to Natsu that his lifeforce is endangered by two magical "seeds" that threaten to turn him into a hybrid of a dragon and demon. Meanwhile, Irene discovers Wendy's immunity to turning into a dragon, and, realizing that their bodies are compatible, successfully enchants her consciousness onto Wendy. However, Wendy simultaneously uses her own enchantment to switch bodies with Irene and reverse the spell, but is unable to continue fighting when Irene injures Wendy's body in the process. Enraged, Irene assumes her dragon form, shatters Erza's bones to immobilize her, and summons a meteor that threatens to kill everyone on the battlefield. Using only her uninjured right arm, Erza magically launches herself skyward to destroy the meteor as Irene watches in disbelief.
315	38	"Dragon or Demon"; Transliteration: "Ryū ka Akuma ka" (Japanese: 竜か悪魔か)	Naoto Hashimoto	Shōji Yonemura	Isamu Fukushima	June 30, 2019
Erza successfully obliterates Irene's meteor, while Wendy enchants Erza's sword with Dragon Slayer magic to injure Irene, but the two are unable to defeat her. As Irene prepares to kill Erza, she remembers her decision to spare her newborn daughter's life and leave her for adoption. Realizing that she still loves Erza, Irene impales herself with her daughter's sword, leaving Erza to pay her respects to her mother. Meanwhile, Igneel instructs Natsu to survive by destroying one of the seeds in his body, which risks turning him into either a dragon or a demon. Natsu instead asserts his identity as a human and destroys both seeds. Natsu revives shortly before Universe One's effects wear off, reverting Fiore to its original shape and sending Fairy Tail's members back to Magnolia, where Natsu and his friends prepare to return to the guildhall.
316	39	"Gray's Trump Card"; Transliteration: "Gurei no Kirifuda" (Japanese: グレイの切り札)	Directed by : Kayo Kamiya; Storyboarded by : Shinji Ishihira	Masashi Sogo	Yūki Morimoto	July 7, 2019
Fairy Tail's members advance through Alvarez's soldiers towards the guildhall. Jacob and Ajeel are defeated, while Brandish leaves the war on friendly terms with Lucy, taking a shrunken Dimaria with her. Gildarts attacks August to stop him from destroying Magnolia, but his magic has no effect on August, who overwhelms him with various spells until Cana arrives to assist her father. Meanwhile, Gray reaches the guildhall to confront Zeref, who confides his true intentions for obtaining Fairy Heart beyond killing Acnologia. Reaffirming his friendship with Natsu, Gray decides to prevent Natsu's death by sealing Zeref away with Lost Iced Shell, a variation of Iced Shell that erases all memory of its caster's existence.
317	40	"Dark Future"; Transliteration: "Kuroi Mirai" (Japanese: 黒い未来)	Tomoya Takayama	Atsuhiro Tomioka	Akihiko Sano	July 14, 2019
Gray almost succeeds in freezing Zeref and sacrificing himself with Lost Iced Shell, but Natsu stops Gray and reconciles with him, promising to defeat Zeref without dying. As they battle, Zeref reasons that Natsu is incapable of killing him without Fire Dragon King Mode. The two briefly halt their duel upon sensing the arrival of Acnologia, who finds Irene's corpse and cruelly mutilates it in front of Erza and Wendy, recognizing her as his "mother" for creating his powers. Meanwhile, Cana casts Fairy Glitter on August, but he is unfazed by the attack. Intrigued by Gildarts and Cana's familial relationship, August enrages Gildarts by threatening Cana.
318	41	"My Name Is..."; Transliteration: "Boku no Namae wa..." (Japanese: ぼくのなまえは...)	Directed by : Fumio Itō; Storyboarded by : Shinji Ishihira	Atsuhiro Tomioka	Hatsue Nakayama	July 21, 2019
Mavis telepathically orders Gray, Lucy, and Happy to rendezvous with her as part of her strategy against Zeref. The three leave Natsu as he continues fighting Zeref, who grows increasingly violent and bloodthirsty under the influence of his curse. Larcade attempts to assist Zeref in killing Natsu, but Zeref angrily attacks Larcade for interfering and denounces him as his son, revealing Larcade to be an Etherious he created. Meanwhile, August continues to question Gildarts and Cana's relationship as he withstands their attacks. After watching him dodge Cana's magical cards, Gildarts discovers that August is vulnerable to tool-based magic, and uses a spell with his own prosthetic arm to injure him. In a series of flashbacks, Zeref and Mavis's son is born and abandoned by Precht while Mavis is in stasis. Imbued with knowledge of his parents' identities, the son grows up and eventually encounters Zeref. Unaware of his son's identity, Zeref notices his resemblance to Mavis and names him after the month he shared a cherished period of time with her, revealing their son to be August.
319	42	"Compassion"; Transliteration: "Jō" (Japanese: 情)	Directed by : Naoto Hashimoto; Storyboarded by : Shinji Ishihira	Shōji Yonemura	Isamu Fukushima & Hatsue Nakayama	July 28, 2019
While Zeref destroys Larcade and resumes his battle with Natsu, August recovers from Gildarts's attack and begins casting a suicidal spell to vaporize Fiore and everyone in it. Upon noticing Gildarts attempt to protect Cana, August ends the spell to spare Mavis, who briefly notices him calling out to her as he disintegrates and dies. Mavis delivers the Book of E.N.D. to Lucy, Happy, and Gray, whom she tasks with using it to prevent Natsu's death before she can kill Zeref. Meanwhile, Jellal protects Erza and Wendy from Acnologia, who reveals himself to be immune to all forms of magic when he devours Jellal's attacks. Ichiya suddenly rams the Christina into Acnologia and rescues the three, telling them about a strategy to defeat Acnologia by luring him to specific location away from Magnolia, and introducing them to a mysterious blonde woman responsible for the plan.
320	43	"Neo Eclipse"; Transliteration: "Neo Ekuripusu" (Japanese: ネオ・エクリプス)	Yūshi Suzuki	Fumihiko Shimo	Yūki Morimoto	August 4, 2019
As the Christina outmaneuvers Acnologia, Wendy recognizes the blonde-haired woman as Anna, who traveled into the present through Eclipse with her and the other Dragon Slayers as their childhood tutor. Anna and Blue Pegasus reveal their plan to trap Acnologia within an inescapable rift in time created as a side effect of using Eclipse. Meanwhile, Natsu's friends determine that they must open the Book of E.N.D. to save Natsu. After incapacitating Natsu, Zeref reveals his plan to perform Neo Eclipse, a spell designed to reset time so that he never becomes immortal and Acnologia is killed, which threatens to erase the current timeline in the process, and requires the power of Fairy Heart and the time rift.
321	44	"Blind to Love"; Transliteration: "Ai wa Mō Mienai" (Japanese: 愛はもう見えない)	Directed by : Tomoya Takayama; Storyboarded by : Shinji Ishihira	Masashi Sogo	Akihiko Sano	August 11, 2019
The Christina lures Acnologia towards the invisible time rift, but when he passes through it unaffected, Anna discovers that the rift is being kept closed by Zeref. While Anna attempts to reopen the rift with her magic, Jellal prepares to distract Acnologia by battling him personally. Meanwhile, Mavis arrives at the guildhall as Natsu uses his Dragon Force to free himself from Zeref's grasp. Mavis attempts to reason with Zeref a final time, telling him she has found a method to kill him, but Zeref refuses to listen and extracts Fairy Heart from her, rendering her unconscious and using it to assume a godlike form.
322	45	"The Door of Vows"; Transliteration: "Chikai no Tobira" (Japanese: 誓いの扉)	Directed by : Yūshi Suzuki; Storyboarded by : Shinji Ishihira	Shōji Yonemura	Hatsue Nakayama	August 18, 2019
While Lucy studies the Book of E.N.D. for a way to sever Natsu's connection to it, Natsu expends his Dragon Force to destroy Zeref, only for Zeref to use Fairy Heart's power to rewind time and restore himself. After mortally wounding Natsu, Zeref reopens the time rift to transform Fairy Tail's front door into Neo Eclipse, which also makes the rift visible, forcing Jellal to risk his own life trying to push Acnologia into the rift. Natsu's injury causes his book's letters to start disappearing, but Lucy heals him by rewriting the missing letters, which allows him to stop Zeref from stepping through the door. However, Lucy's body begins to be overtaken by a malevolent force from within the book.
323	46	"Raging Fire of the Dragon"; Transliteration: "Araburu Ryū no Honō" (Japanese: 荒ぶる竜の炎)	Directed by : Ayaka Tsujihashi; Storyboarded by : Yūya Takahashi	Masashi Sogo	Isamu Fukushima	August 25, 2019
Realizing that Lucy is being burned from the inside by Natsu's demonic flames, Gray uses his ice magic to help her resist and find the page containing E.N.D.'s essence. In a final clash with Zeref, Natsu intensifies his flames until he is able to incinerate Zeref's spell and defeat him, leaving him immobile but alive. Exhausted, Natsu bids Zeref farewell and leaves the guildhall as Mavis regains consciousness and confronts Zeref before he can recover. Meanwhile, Jellal's attack on Acnologia fails, and he is nearly crushed to death in Acnologia's hand. While everyone else falls overboard into the ocean, Anna and Ichiya steer the Christina into Acnologia and push him into the time rift, saving Jellal and sacrificing themselves as they and Acnologia vanish with the rift.
324	47	"When the Fire Dies"; Transliteration: "Honō Kieru Toki" (Japanese: 炎消える時)	Directed by : Hiroshi Akiyama; Storyboarded by : Shinji Ishihira	Fumihiko Shimo	Yūki Morimoto	September 1, 2019
Mavis reveals that her strategy for defeating Zeref is to accept her love for him, admitting that she still harbors feelings for him despite also hating him for his actions. Upon rekindling their love for each other, Mavis and Zeref are both killed by their curse and disappear into a pillar of light, using their life force to resurrect a nearby Makarov. Natsu reunites with his friends after Lucy finishes editing the Book of E.N.D., which vanishes together with Zeref. As the group talks about their upcoming plans, Natsu's friends notice he has suddenly vanished. Lucy cries in despair, believing she has failed to save Natsu. Meanwhile, as her group mourns Ichiya and Anna's sacrifice, Wendy notices a crack appearing in the sky.
325	48	"World Destruction"; Transliteration: "Sekai Hōkai" (Japanese: 世界崩壊)	Tomoya Takayama	Atsuhiro Tomioka	Akihiko Sano	September 8, 2019
Acnologia breaks through the crack in the sky, having eaten the time rift's magic to escape. He proceeds to wreak destruction across Earth-land, transporting the other Dragon Slayers into the rift with Natsu. Anna is also freed alongside Ichiya, and explains to the other wizards that the time rift's magic has separated Acnologia's physical body from his spirit, which is using the Dragon Slayers' magic to stabilize itself within the rift. As the wizards regroup with their allies in Magnolia, Acnologia attempts to trap Natsu in crystal with the other Dragon Slayers. The Dragon Slayers regain their strength and escape upon hearing their friends' voices, and prepare to battle Acnologia together.
326	49	"Magic of Hope"; Transliteration: "Kibō no Mahō" (Japanese: 希望の魔法)	Directed by : Kazunobu Shimizu; Storyboarded by : Shinji Ishihira	Masashi Sogo	Hatsue Nakayama	September 15, 2019
Four-hundred years in the past, a then-unnamed Acnologia lives as a human doctor in a secluded village that is protected by another dragon named Acnologia, who leaves to investigate rumors of Dragon Slayer magic. Later, the doctor watches in horror as the mutilated guardian returns and leads the other dragons in destroying the village. In the present, the Dragon Slayers' attacks have no effect on Acnologia's spirit due to his immunity to magic. Meanwhile, Lucy devises a plan to trap Acnologia's mindless body within Fairy Sphere, the only spell Acnologia has ever failed to overcome. The other wizards use their magic to lure Acnologia to Hargeon, where they intend to use one of Alvarez's abandoned ships to temporarily impair him with his own motion sickness. Upon arriving, Acnologia senses the threat and instinctively destroys the entire fleet.
327	50	"Hearts Connected"; Transliteration: "Tsunagaru Kokoro" (Japanese: 繋がる心)	Directed by : Yūshi Suzuki; Storyboarded by : Shinji Ishihira	Masashi Sogo	Isamu Fukushima	September 22, 2019
Four-hundred years prior, the human Acnologia learns Dragon Slayer magic and begins indiscriminately killing dragons as revenge for the guardian Acnologia's betrayal, eventually renaming himself Acnologia and transforming into a dragon after forgetting his original name. In the present, Gray and Lyon create a new ship made of ice, while Erza forces Acnologia's body onto it with her weaponry. Lucy uses all of Fairy Tail's magic to cast Fairy Sphere on Acnologia while he is afflicted, but their power is insufficient. As Acnologia begins to break free, Meldy uses her Maguilty Sense to reinforce the guild's magic with those of the wizards across Ishgar. Meanwhile, Acnologia's spirit defeats all of the Dragon Slayers except for Natsu, whom Wendy enchants with all of their magic in a final effort to overpower Acnologia.
328	51	"Dearest Friends"; Transliteration: "Kakegae no Nai Nakama-tachi" (Japanese: かけがえのない仲間たち)	Directed by : Naoto Hashimoto; Storyboarded by : Shinji Ishihira	Masashi Sogo	Akihiko Sano	September 29, 2019
Acnologia's body and spirit are immobilized by Fairy Sphere's power, allowing Natsu to kill him with the Dragon Slayers' combined magic, which releases the Dragon Slayers from the time rift. One year later, Fairy Tail attends an award ceremony for a novel Lucy has published about her experiences at the guild, with Lucy recounting how her friends' lives have changed since the war. Among the crowd, the partygoers spot two strangers resembling Mavis and Zeref, who meet and befriend each other. The next morning, Natsu and Happy invite Lucy on a job, which reminds her of all their shared adventures as she tearfully thanks them for influencing her own life. Natsu dismisses the sentiment, but assures her that they will be together regardless. The three then accompany their team to embark on the guild's century-old "100 Years Quest".
