= Best of GO!GO! =

Greatest hits album by GO!GO!7188
- Released: 15 March 2006
- Genre: Rock
- Label: Toshiba-EMI

GO!GO!7188 chronology
Gonbuto Tour Nippon Budokan (Kanzenban) (2005)	Best of GO!GO! (2006)	Parade (2006)

Best of GO!GO! (ベスト オブ ゴー！ゴー！) is a 2006 compilation album by Japanese rock band GO!GO!7188. It contains the track "Kami-sama no Hima Tsubushi" which, until the 2026 vinyl release of Parade, was exclusive to the album. Limited editions were sold with a bonus CD copy of "the legendary ¥100 cassette that was sold before [the band's] debut." As part of the promotion of the album, Go!Go! held an exclusive mini-concert on February 14 at the Tower Records in Shibuya for those that had pre-ordered the album.

== Reception ==
Musician Yoko Yazawa included Best of GO!GO! in her list of albums which had a big influence on her, highlighting its mixture of rock music with Japanese melodies as well as its relatable lyrics. The album charted twelve times on the Oricon chart, reaching a peak position of 12.

== Track listing ==
1. Koi no Uta (こいのうた) (Love Song)
2. C7
3. Thunder Girl (Kanden Version) (サンダーガール(感電ヴァージョン) (Thunder Girl - Electric Shock Version)
4. Kunoichi (くのいち) (Female ninja)
5. Taiyō (太陽) (Sun)
6. Dotanba de Cancel (ドタン場でキャンセル) (A Last-minute Cancellation)
7. Tsuki to Kōra (月と甲羅) (The Moon and a Shell)
8. Kangaegoto (考え事) (Thoughts)
9. Ruriiro (瑠璃色) (Azure)
10. Jet Ninjin (ジェットにんぢん) (Jet Carrot)
11. Tokage 3-gō (とかげ3号) (Lizard #3)
12. Otona no Kusuri (大人のくすり) (Adult Medicine)
13. Otona no Himitsu (大人のひみつ) (The Secrets of Adults)
14. Rock (ロック)
15. Bungu (文具) (Stationery)
16. Ukifune (浮舟) (Floating Boat)
17. Kami-sama no Hima Tsubushi (神様のヒマ潰し) (God's Spare Time)

Bonus Disc

1. Pa-Pa-Pantsu ~ Pre-Debut Edit
2. Koi no Uta ~ Pre-Debut Edit
