= Kyū Ni Ichi Jiken =

Kyū Ni Ichi Jiken 九・ニ一事件

Live album by GO!GO!7188
- Released: 10 December 2003
- Recorded: 21 September 2003
- Venue: Hibiya Open Air Concert Hall
- Genre: Rock
- Length: 77:59
- Label: Toshiba-EMI

GO!GO!7188 chronology
Tategami (2003)	Kyū Ni Ichi Jiken 九・ニ一事件 (2003)	Ryūzetsuran (2004)

Kyū Ni Ichi Jiken (九･二一事件) is a 2003 live album by GO!GO!7188. It is a recording of the band's performance on September 21, 2003, at the Hibiya Open Air Concert Hall, which occurred during a typhoon. The album name translates in English as The September 21st Incident. Kyū Ni Ichi Jiken charted at a top position of 29 on the Oricon chart. First editions included a DVD.

== Track listing ==
=== CD ===
1. Otona no Kusuri (大人のくすり Adult Medicine)
2. Umashika Mono (うましかもの Stupid Things)
3. Bungu (文具 Stationery)
4. Thunder Girl (サンダーガール)
5. Kanojo to Watashi (彼女と私 She and I)
6. Nanashi (ななし Nameless)
7. Ore wa Drummer (俺はドラマー I am a Drummer)
8. Ruriiro (瑠璃色 Azure)
9. Akai Sofa (赤いソファー Red Sofa)
10. Knife (ナイフ)
11. Ame Nochi Ame Nochi Ame (雨のち雨のち雨 Endless Rain)
12. Nukarumi (ぬかるみ Mud)
13. Ukifune (浮舟 Floating Boat) (a character and chapter title from The Tale of Genji)
14. Tokage 3-gō (とかげ3号 Lizard #3)
15. Rock (ロック)

=== DVD ===
1. Polaroid (ポラロイド)
2. Koi no Uta (こいのうた Love Song)
3. Jet Ninjin (ジェットにんぢん Jet Carrot)
