= Gonbuto Tour Nippon Budokan (Kanzenban) =

Live album by GO!GO!7188
- Released: 16 March 2005
- Recorded: 21 December 2004
- Venue: Nippon Budokan
- Genre: Rock
- Label: Toshiba-EMI

GO!GO!7188 chronology
Ryuuzetsuran (2004)	Gonbuto Tour Nippon Budokan (Kanzenban) (2005)	Best of GO!GO! (2006)

Gonbuto Tour Nippon Budokan (Kanzenban) (ごんぶとツアー日本武道館 (完全版), Gonbuto Tsuaa Nippon Budōkan [Kanzenban]) is a 2005 live album by Japanese rock band GO!GO!7188. It captures the band's performance at the Nippon Budokan during the Gonbuto Tour in promotion of their then current album, Ryuuzetsuran. The performance was also made available as a video recording on DVD in 2005 before receiving a Blu-ray release by Universal Music in March 2026.

== Track listing ==
Disk 1

1. Opening SE (オープニング SE)
2. Akai Tsuki ni Hoeru Yoru (赤い月に吠える夜 A Night for Howling at the Red Moon)
3. Umashika Mono (うましかもの Stupid Things)
4. Violet no Sora (バイオレットの空 Violet Sky)
5. Sen'nichikō (千日紅 Gomphrena)
6. Otona no Kusuri (大人のくすり Adult Medicine)
7. Koi no Dokuyaku (恋の毒薬 Love’s Drug)
8. Yukue Fūmei (行方不明 Missing Person)
9. Nanashi (ななし Untitled)
10. Thundergirl (サンダーガール)
11. Aoi Kiretsu (青い亀裂 Blue Crack)
12. C_{7}

Disk 2

1. Tokyo (東京)
2. Futatsu no Ashioto (二つの足音 Two Footsteps)
3. Umi no Uma (うみのうま Sea Horse)
4. Kangaegoto (考え事 Thoughts)
5. Shoshū (初秋 Early Autumn)
6. Koi no Uta (こいのうた Love Song)
7. Rock (ロック)
8. Taxi (タクシー)
9. Ukifune (浮舟) (A character and chapter title from The Tale of Genji)
10. Otona no Himitsu (大人のひみつ The Secrets of Adults)
11. Kunoichi (くのいち)
12. Bungu (文具 Stationery)
13. Tokage 3-gō (とかげ3号 Lizard #3)
