= Tora no Ana =

Studio album by GO!GO!7188
- Released: 10 July 2002
- Genre: Rock
- Length: 29:14
- Label: Toshiba-EMI

GO!GO!7188 chronology
Gyotaku (2001)	Tora no Ana (2002)	Tategami (2003)

Tora no Ana (虎の穴, Tora no Ana) is a 2002 cover album by GO!GO!7188, containing covers of anime songs and Japanese pop songs from the 60s and 70s. The name translates in English as Tiger's Lair while the cover art has been compared to that of Revolver by The Beatles. The album sold approximately 100,000 copies and reached number 15 on the Oricon albums chart. In 2008, Go!Go! released a second cover album, titled Tora no Ana 2.

== Track listing ==
1. Yōkai Ningen Bem (妖怪人間ベム) - from the anime of the same name
2. Koi no Dorei (恋の奴隷) - Slave to Love - Chiyo Okumura cover
3. Hitonatsu no Keiken (ひと夏の経験) - An Experience of One Summer - Momoe Yamaguchi cover
4. Cutie Honey (キューティーハニー) - Cutie Honey OP cover
5. Ban Ban Ban (バンバンバン) - The Spiders cover
6. Pepper Keibu (ペッパー警部) - Inspector Pepper - Pink Lady cover
7. Kimi dake ni Ai o (君だけに愛を) - Love for Only You - The Tigers cover
8. Kokoro no Tabi (心の旅) - Heart's Journey - Tulip cover
