= Kinkyori Ren'ai =

Single by GO!GO!7188

from the album Parade
- B-side: "Denwa wo Toritakunai Hi"
- Released: 13 September 2006
- Genre: Rock
- Label: Toshiba-EMI
- Songwriter: Yumi Nakashima
- Producer: Shigekazu Aida

Kinkyori Ren'ai (近距離恋愛, "Short-Distance Love") is the 12th single by GO!GO!7188, released in late 2006, over two years after their previous single, "Aoi Kiretsu". The single was produced with the help of veteran producer Shigekazu Aida. It reached a top position of 22nd on the Oricon weekly charts.

== Track listing ==
All lyrics are written by Akiko Hamada; all music is composed by Yumi Nakashima.

CD
No.	Title	Arranger(s)	Length
1.	"Kinkyori Ren'ai (近距離恋愛, "Short-Distance Love")"	Shigekazu Aida, GO!GO!7188	3:34
2.	"Denwa o Toritakunai Hi (電話を取りたくない日, "The Day I Didn’t Want to take my Phone")"	Akito Katayose, GO!GO!7188	4:32
