= Hōkō-ji =

Hōkō-ji is the name of a number of Buddhist temples in Japan, including:

- Hōkō-ji (Kyoto) (方広寺), a Tendai temple in Kyoto
- Hōkō-ji (Shizuoka) (方広寺), a Rinzai temple in Shizuoka Prefecture
- Hōkō-ji (法興寺), Another name for Asuka-dera; see also Gangō-ji
- Hōkō-ji (蜂岡寺, usually pronounced "Hachioka-dera"), an archaic name for Kōryū-ji, a Shingon temple in Kyoto

Other Japanese temples named "Hōkō-ji" include:

- Hōkō-ji (法光寺) in Miki City, Hyōgo Prefecture dates from the 7th century
- Hōkō-ji (放光寺) in Enzan, Yamanashi Prefecture dates from the 12th century
- Hōkō-ji (法光寺) near Kamogawa, Chiba Prefecture dates from the 13th century

Temples named "Hōkō-ji" in the United States include:

- Hōkō-ji (Taos) in Taos County, New Mexico
