= GO!GO!7188 =

Japanese rock band

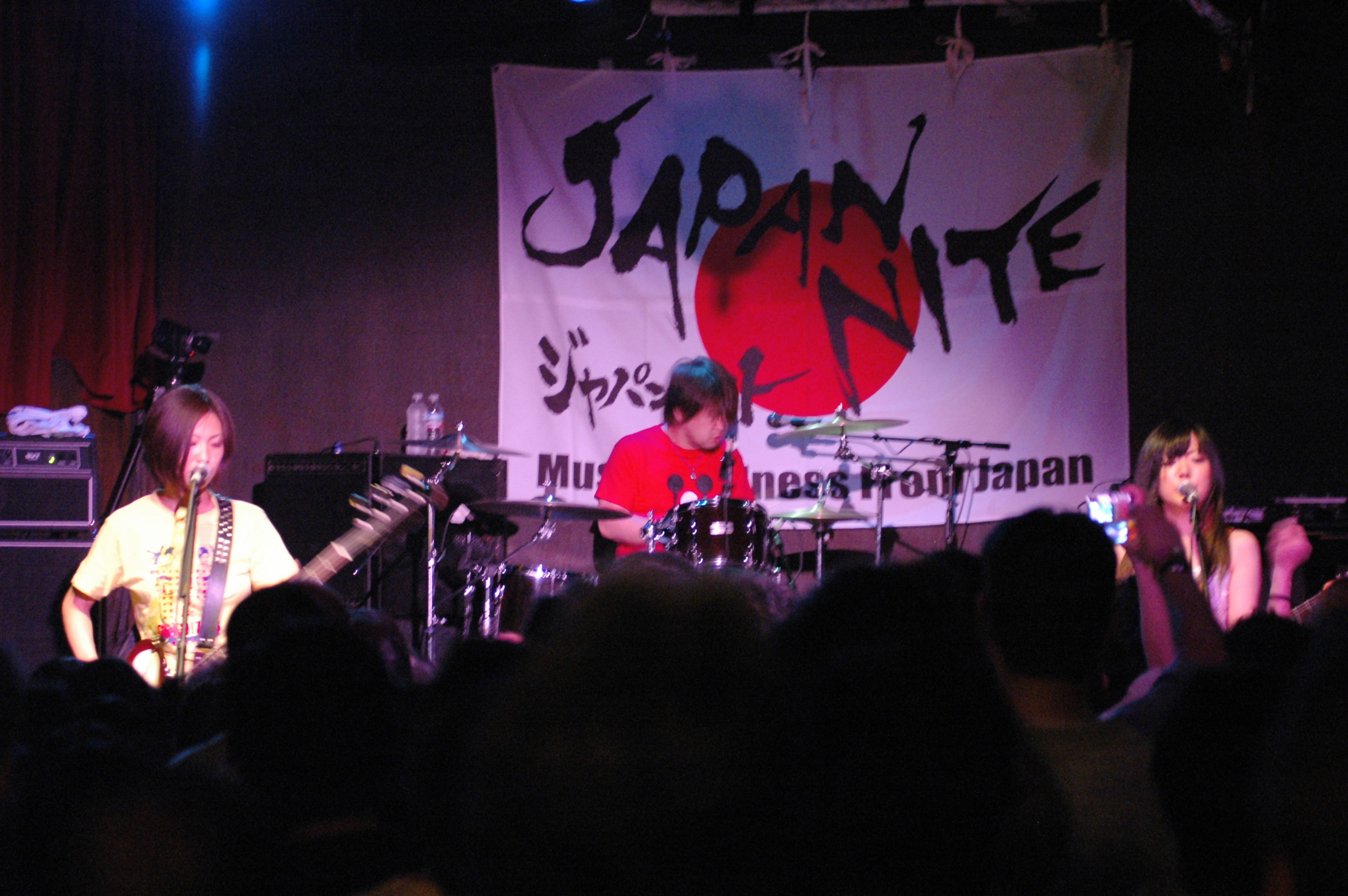
- GO!GO!7188 while on the Japan Nite tour in 2007. From left to right: Akko, Turkey and Yuu

Background information
- Origin: Kagoshima City, Japan
- Genres: Rock; surf rock
- Years active: 1998–2012
- Labels: Capitol Music; Toshiba-EMI; BMG Japan; FlyingStar Records
- Spinoffs: Chirinuruwowaka
- Past members: Yuu; Akko; Turkey
- Website: www.gogo7188.jp

Go!Go!7188 (Go Go Nana Ichi Hachi Hachi), also known simply as Go!Go!, was a Japanese rock band with influences spanning from surf rock to punk rock to enka.

== History ==
In June 1998, Yumi Nakashima (nicknamed Yuu) and Akiko Hamada (nicknamed Akko), both alumnae of the same year at Shoyo High School in Kagoshima of Kyūshū, formed a band with the goal of participating in a national competition. They had previously played together in a Judy and Mary cover band while in high school along with three other girls from their school. The band broke up when the members graduated; Yuu and Akko wanted to continue but the other members did not. In college, Yuu and Akko formed a new band, along with a boy who played the drums and was the same age as them. In November 1998 they participated in the Yamaha Music Foundation's Teens' Music Festival as Go Go 7188. They didn't win the grand prize but their performance was seen by their future producer and later the band was signed to the talent agency breast/milia.

Drummer Takayuki Hosokawa (nicknamed Turkey) joined Go!Go!7188 in 1999 and the band then signed with major label Toshiba-EMI. They went to Tokyo in February 2000 and started recording on the same day they arrived. Their first single, "Taiyō," was released a few months later on June 28. A few days later, the band played their first standalone concert, held at Club Quattro in Shibuya on July 3. Go!Go!7188 starting recording their debut album in September of that year with plans to release it in December. The album, Dasoku Hokō, was released on December 6, 2000, and peaked at number 25 on the Oricon albums chart.

In April 2001, "Dotanba de Cancel" was released as the first single from Go!Go!7188's follow up album. Reviewers noted the song's sad melody and lyrics, which stood in contrast to their usually upbeat material. Later that year, on August 5, the band played at the Rock In Japan Festival for the first time.

Go!Go!7188 released their second album, Gyotaku, on November 21, 2001. Reviewers pointed out the "garage-style" rock, melodies "filled with Taishō era romanticism" and "well-constructed key changes" present in the songs. The album surpassed its predecessor, reaching 17 on the Oricon chart.

The following year, on July 10, Go!Go! released their first cover album, titled Tora no Ana. The tracklist included covers of "Shōwa era pop songs and anime songs." As part of the promotion of the album, Toshiba EMI held a contest with a one million yen prize. Later in 2002, on October 9, the band released "Ukifune," the first single from their subsequent original album. The song, based on the story of Ukifune from The Tale of Genji, combined "Japanese taste with rock," resulting in an "enka-rock" sound which "drip[ped] malevolent mystery." The single peaked at number 12 on the Oricon chart.

On February 26, 2003, Go!Go!7188 released Tategami, their third original album. The new collection of songs "demonstrate[d] a post-punk influence" and "[drew] on the sounds of postwar 'kayoukyoku' pop music." Additionally, the band's sound and lyrics on the new album were described as having more depth and power, resulting in the group becoming "a more exciting force." The album reached number five on the Oricon albums chart. Later in the year, on August 2, Go!Go! played at the Summer Sonic music festival in Tokyo.

Later in 2003, on August 8, Go!Go! released the single "Ruriiro." It was described as "slightly spooky" and having an "Arabian-style sound." The song's music video was directed by Higuchinsky. A few months later, on October 8, Akko released her first solo album, Kirari, under the name of Akiko Hamada.

On February 25, 2004, Yuu released her solo album Ten no Mikaku. It featured jazz and cabaret-style music and incorporated sanshin, kokyū and strings on some tracks, with only one track featuring Yuu on guitar.

Later that year, on October 27, Go!Go!7188 released their fourth original album, titled Ryūzetsuran. The band embarked on a nationwide tour the following month, which included a date at the famed Nippon Budokan on December 21. The footage and audio from the concert was later released on DVD and as the band's second live album on March 16, 2005.

In 2005, Yuu formed a new band, Chirinuruwowaka, which differed from Go!Go!7188 by the inclusion of a second guitarist. The band released their debut album, Iroha, on September 28, 2005. On November 2 of that year, Akko released her second solo album, Aruyoude Naiyoude, Arumono. It was inspired by her travels to such places as Fukuoka, Aso and Nakashibetsu and featured elements of jazz, rock and experimental music.

On October 1, 2006, Akko announced on her official site that she had gotten married and had changed her legal name to Akiko Noma. That same month, Go!Go!7188 released their fifth studio album, Parade. The band commented that after pursuing solo activities in the previous year, they had learned that they "did music for fun," which provided the focus for making the album.

In early 2007, Go!Go!7188 transferred to BMG Japan. That March, the band carried out their first tour of the United States as part of the multi-band Japan Nite tour, including performances in New York City, Los Angeles, and at SXSW in Austin, Texas. Later that year, in August, Go!Go!7188 returned to the United States for a second tour, playing at Musikfest in Bethel, Pennsylvania, as well as concerts in New York City and Chicago.

On October 24, 2007, Go!Go!7188 released their sixth album and first on BMG Japan, 569 (pronounced Go Rock). Four days before the album was available in stores, the band made all of the tracks available on their MySpace page. In early 2008, Go!Go! partnered up with various bands for a tour entitled Tetsuko no Hair (a play on the talk show Tetsuko no Heya), including Mongol800.

Later in 2008, on May 28, Go!Go!7188 released their second cover album, titled Tora no Ana 2. Regarding the songs included on the album, Akko stated that the band tried to make each one show off their best parts. Each track was arranged into the "Go!Go! rock style," such as their surf rock version of Pink Lady's "Nagisa no Sinbad" and cover of Spitz's "Spider" incorporating the intro from "There She Goes" by The La's.

Also on May 28, 2008, Go!Go! released the single "Kataomoi Fighter," which was written for the ending theme of the Itazura na Kiss anime adaption. While writing the song, Yuu stated that she imagined watching the anime on TV and Akko mentioned that she wrote the lyrics while thinking about her high-school days. The single peaked at number 37 on the Billboard Japan Hot 100 chart. In addition to the band featuring on the ending theme, Yuu voiced one of the characters in the eighth episode. While on their American tours, the band realized that there were still many parts of Japan that they hadn't visited, such as the San'in region, and so in October 2008 set off on a national tour of 16 cities that they hadn't performed at before.

Go!Go! released their seventh original album, Antenna, on February 4, 2009. The songs on it were described as a "speedy, energetic flurry of sound." Akko explained that with the recording process, the band "decided to play around with the sound" and "try new things", spurred on by their tour the previous year with other bands. In support of the album, the Go!Go! embarked on the Hentena Tour in March but had to postpone it in May when Akko was diagnosed with a retinal detachment. The tour resumed a few months later in August, including a date at the JCB Hall in Tokyo.

In 2010, they transferred to FlyingStar Records (Victor Entertainment). On June 2, Go!Go! released their eighth and final studio album, Go!!Go!Go!Go!! The album reached number 10 on the Billboard Japan Top Albums chart.

On February 10, 2012, the band announced on their website that they were disbanding. The month after their break up saw the release of the album Last Live of Go!Go! ~"Go!!Go!Go!Go!!Tour" Live 8.7.2010 Tokyo, which was recorded at the Shibuya AX. This was followed in May with the release of two compilation albums. One album, Coupling Best of Go!Go!, contained tracks that were previously only available on the band's singles. The other album, Rare Collection of Go!Go!, was only released digitally. It collected songs from their EMI singles as well as two recordings from their Tonosama Tour 2001. Then, in October, the compilation Very Best of Go!Go! was released. Peaking at number 50 on the Billboard Japan Top Album Sales chart, the record contained all 15 of the band's singles plus a live studio recording from 2001.

In 2019, Yuu and Akko reunited, writing and recording two songs for actress and creative artist Non, which appeared on her Baby Face mini-album released that June. The following year, Akko and Yuu collaborated again with Non, creating the song "Nama Iki ni Skirt". The track, released as a digital single, was utilized as the theme song for the Kagoshima television program Nama Iki Voice. On November 1, 2026, Yuu and Akko were guest performers at Non's tour stop at Zepp Shinjuku. This show marked the first time the duo had performed together since Go!Go!7188's disbandment.

== Members ==
- Yū (ユウ), Real name: Yumi Nakashima (中島 優美, Nakashima Yumi; born December 1, 1979) is the lead vocalist, guitarist, and songwriter. Released a solo album, Ten no Mikaku as Yuu, in 2004. Released the album Iroha with side band, Chirinuruwowaka in 2005.
- Akko (アッコ), Real name: Akiko Noma (野間 亜紀子, Noma Akiko; maiden name: Hamada (浜田); born February 13, 1980) is the bassist, backup vocalist, and lyricist. Released a solo album, Kirari under her real name in 2003. Second solo album, Aru yō de nai yō de, aru mono, was released on November 2, 2005.
- Turkey (ターキー), Real name: Takayuki Hosokawa (細川 央行, Hosokawa Takayuki; born July 10, 1973) is the drummer, additional vocals.

== Discography ==
=== Singles ===
1. Taiyō (太陽, "Sun") (June 28, 2000)
2. Jet Ninjin (ジェットにんぢん, "Jet Carrot") (August 30, 2000)
3. Koi no Uta (こいのうた, "Love Song") (October 25, 2000)
4. Mushi '98 (むし'98, "Bug '98") (November 16, 2000)
5. Dotanba de Cancel (ドタン場でキャンセル, "Last Minute Cancel") (April 11, 2001)
6. Aa Seishun (あぁ青春, "Ah, Youth") (July 11, 2001)
7. C7 (October 24, 2001)
8. Ukifune (浮舟,"Ukifune") (October 9, 2002)
9. Tane (種, "Seed") (April 25, 2003)
10. Ruriiro (瑠璃色, "Color of Lapis Lazuli") (August 6, 2003)
11. Aoi Kiretsu (青い亀裂, "Blue Crack") (August 25, 2004)
12. Kinkyori Ren'ai (近距離恋愛, "Short Distance Relationship") (September 13, 2006)
13. Manatsu no Dance Hall (真夏のダンスホール, "Midsummer Dance Hall") (June 28, 2007)
14. Kataomoi Fighter "Itazura na Kiss" first ending (片思いファイター, "Unrequited Love Fighter") (May 28, 2008)
15. Futashika Tashika (ふたしかたしか, "Uncertain Certainty") (January 14, 2009)

=== Albums ===
==== Original albums ====
1. Dasoku Hokō (蛇足歩行) (December 6, 2000)
2. Gyotaku (魚磔) (November 21, 2001)
3. Tategami (鬣) (February 26, 2003)
4. Ryūzetsuran (竜舌蘭) (October 27, 2004)
5. Parade (パレード) (October 18, 2006)
6. 569 (ゴーロック Go Rock) (October 24, 2007)
7. Antenna (アンテナ) (February 2, 2009)
8. Go!!GO!GO!Go!! (June 2, 2010)

==== Other albums ====
1. Tora no Ana (虎の穴) (July 10, 2002) (cover album)
2. Kyū Ni Ichi Jiken (九・二一事件) (December 10, 2003) (live album)
3. Gonbuto Tour Nippon Budōkan (Kanzen-ban) (ごんぶとツアー日本武道館(完全版)) (March 16, 2005) (live album)
4. Who Plays a Go-Go? ~Go!Go!7188 Amateur Tribute Album~ (April 20, 2005) (tribute album)
5. Best of Go!Go! (ベスト オブ ゴー！ゴー！) (April 15, 2006) (best album)
6. Tora no Ana 2 (虎の穴 2) (May 28, 2008) (cover album)
7. 2man Tour Tetsuko no Hair + Open Night Family ~Yokae no Kazoku~ CD + DVD (October 29, 2008) (live album & DVD documentary)
8. Last Live of Go! Go! ~"Go!!Go!Go!Go!! Tour" Live 8.7.2010 Tokyo~ (March 28, 2012) (live album)
9. Coupling Best of GO!GO! (カップリング ベスト オブ ゴー! ゴー!) (May 16, 2012) (best album)
10. Very Best of Go! Go! (ベリー ベスト オブ ゴー!ゴー!) (October 10, 2012) (best album)

=== DVDs and videos ===
1. Go!Go!7188 Tonosama Tour 2001 (Go!Go!7188とのさまツアー2001) (October 24, 2001)
2. Go!Go! Daieizō-sai (Go!Go!大映像祭!) (March 19, 2003)
3. Go!Go!7188 Gonbuto Tour Nihon Budokan (Go!Go!7188 ごんぶとツアー 日本武道館) (March 16, 2005)
4. Go!Go! Daieizō-sai (Omake-tsuki) (Go!Go!大映像祭! (おまけ付)) (March 15, 2006)
5. Go!Go!7188 6.21 Jiken (October 29, 2008) DVD (limited & regular editions)

== Radio ==
- Go!Go!Sakurajima (2000)
- Go!Go!7188's allnightnippon-r (2000–2001)
- Go!Go!7188's BeiBeiKin (2004)
- Go!Go!7188's BeiBeiKin 1/2 (2005)
- Go!Go!7188's BeiBeiSui 1/2 (2005–2006)
