= Chirinuruwowaka =

Japanese rock band

- Origin: Japan
- Genres: Rock; Math rock; Alternative rock; Shoegaze
- Years active: 2005; 2006; 2010–present
- Labels: Capitol Music; BM Tunes; FlyingStar; Yamamichi
- Members: Yumi Nakashima
- Past members: Eikichi Iwai; Kosaku Abe; Haruhito Miyashita; Natsuki Sakamoto
- Website: chirinuruwowaka.jp

Chirinuruwowaka (Note: often stylized as CHIRINURUWOWAKA) (チリヌルヲワカ), is a Japanese rock band formed in 2005 by Yumi Nakashima, known from the band GO!GO!7188.

== History ==
=== 2005: Beginning ===
In 2004, while a member of GO!GO!7188, Yumi Nakashima released her solo album, Ten no Mikaku. Following its recording, however, Nakashima realized that she preferred making music in a group and so set out to form a band.

Selecting musicians that she wanted to work with, she invited bassist Eikichi Iwai, although she only knew him from one of his recordings, and drummer Kosaku Abe, from the band The Collectors, with whom she had worked with on her solo album. Additionally, Nakashima sought to bring in a second guitarist, one younger than her, who could bring ideas that she didn't have. After holding an audition for the role, 20-year-old Haruhito Miyashita was selected.

Nakashima named the band after being inspired by the Heian-era poem, "Iroha". She stated that after hearing the phrase "chirinuru wo waka" in the line "iro wa nihoheto chirinuru wo waka", it clicked with her and she decided to name the band after that phrase. Chirinuruwowaka performed their first concert on June 13, 2005, playing at Club 251 in Shimokitazawa.

Chirinuruwowaka released their debut album, Iroha, on September 28, 2005. The band then embarked on the Jazzminton tour to promote the album. The following year, on April 30, they released their first single, "Shingetsu", on BM Tunes. In addition to the new song, the release also included live recordings from the recent tour.

=== 2007-2009: Hiatus ===
Starting in 2007, Chirinuruwowaka went on hiatus. During this period, Nakashima resumed activity with GO!GO!7188 while Miyashita left the group. Additionally, Abe started his own solo project, Myqroczuqay.

=== 2010-Present: Restart ===
Following Miyashita's departure, the band was in need of another guitarist. Iwai suggested a support musician by the name of Natsuki Sakamoto, whom he had previously performed a concert with during Chirinuruwowaka's hiatus. After playing a jam session with the band, Sakamoto joined the group in January 2010 and that September Chirinuruwowaka resumed activity.

The band released the mini-album Shiro Ana on April 20, 2011, which marked the band's first release since "Shingetsu" in 2006. It included the digital single "White Hole" as well as the song "Amanojaku", which originally appeared on Ten no Mikaku but was rearranged with the sense of speed typical of Chirinuruwowaka.

On April 27 2012, Chirinuruwowaka released their second full album, titled Akayoroshi. It was the band's first record after the break-up of GO!GO!7188 in February of that year. One of the tracks, titled "Zettaichi", was written by Nakashima following the events of the Great East Japan Earthquake. Regarding the lyrics, she explained that she wanted to convey gratitude for being alive, the powerlessness of humans, and kindness. Additionally, the album contained one song that was composed not just by Nakashima but the whole band.

That year also saw the release of the song "Yoi no Kuchi", which was used in the Atelier Ayesha: The Alchemist of Dusk video game and included in its accompanying Twilight Hour vocal album. The band had been invited to create a song for the game by the game's director, Yoshito Okamura, who was a fan of both Chirinuruwowaka and GO!GO!7188. The song's title, translated as "Evening Stars", was chosen by Nakashima after examining the game's story and worldview. Abe explained that the band strove to give the song an acoustic feel, in contrast to their usual material.

Chirinuruwowaka released their first live album in February 2013, titled: Unplugged ~Official Pirate Edition~. The album was recorded back in July 2012 during the band's acoustic concerts at Tokorozawa Mojo and Otodama Sea Studio at Zushi Beach. In addition to including performances of songs from the band's albums, it also included a recording of "Yoi no Kuchi".

The band's fourth album, Analog, was released a few months later, in April 2013. The title was selected after recording had finished, in part to reflect the tracks being recorded on analog tape. It marked a simplification in Nakashima's lyrics, which was done in response to comments that her word choice made them difficult to understand. The album was made available the day before its release on April 20, at a joint concert with Tricot. In November, Chirinuruwowaka played their first solo concert in Hokkaido.

Also in 2013, Chirinuruwowaka made subsequent contributions to the Atelier game series. Two songs, "Miruku Iro no Tōge" and "Amai Gohōbi", were used in Atelier Escha & Logy: Alchemists of the Dusk Sky, which was released that June. "Miruku Iro no Tōge" was used in the game's opening movie while "Amai Gohōbi" was used as the ending theme. A few months later, on August 29, the band performed at an event held by the Atelier series' publisher, Gust, at Club Quattro in Shibuya.

In April 2014, Chirinuruwowaka released It, their fifth album. The album, named after one of the songs on it, marked the band's first release with a solely English title. The title was chosen as the word "it" closely resembles the pronunciation used in some of the song's lines. The music video for the title track referenced dance arcade games and featured a "top player" of such games. Several months later, on October 24, Chirinuruwowaka released another album, titled Knitting. It contained acoustic arrangements of songs from the band's catalogue, including the two tracks used in the Atelier video game from the previous year.

2015 marked ten years since the Chirinuruwowaka's formation. To commemorate the anniversary, the band embarked on a ten date tour, starting on the same day as their very first concert, June 13. A few months earlier, Chirinuruwowaka released a new studio album, Awo Awo, in April. The title was chosen to convey the group's desire to stay "fresh and green" despite their accumulated experience.

Work began on their subsequent album, (eventually titled Showtime), while touring in promotion of Awo Awo in 2015. In January 2016, however, it was announced that Sakamoto had left Chirinuruwowaka. The band decided to carry on as a trio but, as recording had yet to commence, adjustments needed to be made to the song arrangements. Nakashima assumed the sole guitar role but commented that doing so benefited her playing. Showtime was later released in May 2016. That July saw the release of the Ninja Slayer From Compilation "Batsu" album. It contained songs used as ending themes in the special edition of the anime, including the Chirinuruwowaka track "Ikari no Fudesaki", which was utilized in the ninth episode.

In 2019, Abe also left the band, leaving Nakashima and Iwai as the two remaining original members. Daiki Nakahata joined Chirinuruwowaka as a support drummer following Abe's departure, first appearing on the album Sapient, released in 2020.

In October 2025, Chirinuruwowaka released their 16th album, Doku to Kusuri. Later in the year, the band performed overseas for the first time with concerts in Shanghai and Guangzhou. The following year saw the release of Public, an album with each track titled after a public place. Nakashima explained that she named the songs this way to help listeners more readily grasp the imagery conveyed by her lyrics. On November 11, 2026, it was announced that Iwai had died suddenly.

== Members ==
=== Current members ===
- Yumi Nakashima (中島優美, Nakashima Yumi; born December 1, 1979, Kagoshima-shi, Kagoshima), guitar and vocals. She was a member of GO!GO!7188.

=== Support members ===
- Daiki Nakahata (中畑大樹, Nakahata Daiki; born July 25, 1974, Aomori), drums. Member of Syrup16g and Vola & The Oriental Machine.

=== Former members ===
- Eikichi Iwai (イワイエイキチ, Iwai Eikichi; born May 9, 1969, Kitakyūshū-shi, Fukuoka), bass guitar. He was also a member of The Primals. As a producer and session musician, Iwai worked with various musicians including Shiina Ringo, Hiroshi Takano, Suneohair, Acidman and Yui.
- Kōsaku Abe (阿部耕作, Abe Kōsaku; born July 30, 1966, Kanagawa), drums. He was also a member of The Collectors, Love Jets, and Texas Taxis.
- Haruhito Miyashita (宮下治人, Miyashita Haruhito; born February 8, 1985, Nagano), guitar. He is a member of Mimitto.
- Natsuki Sakamoto (坂本夏樹, Sakamoto Natsuki; born August 28, 1985, Wakayama), guitar.

== Discography ==
=== Albums ===
- Iroha (2005)
- Shiro Ana (2011)
- Akayoroshi (2012)
- Unplugged ～Official Pirate Edition～ (2013)
- Analog (2013)
- It (2014)
- Knitting (2014)
- Awo Awo (2015)
- ShowTime (2016)
- Kimi no Mirai ni You ga Aru (2017)
- Non-fiction(2018)
- Minus One (2018)
- Taiyou no Inu Ma ni (2019)
- Sapient (2020)
- Kesshō (2021)
- Apocalypse (2022)
- Seven Innocence (2023)
- Biology (2024)
- Doku to Kusuri (2025)
- Public (2026)

=== Singles ===
- Shingetsu (2006)
- White Hole
