= Hōkō Shimamura =

Japanese photographer

Hōkō Shimamura (島村 逢紅, Shimamura Hōkō; 1890–1944) was a Japanese photographer.
