= Miyuna =

Japanese singer

- みゆな
- Born: June 7, 2002 (age 24); Miyazaki-ken, Japan
- Occupations: Singer; songwriter
- Musical career
- Genres: J-pop; rock
- Instruments: Vocals; guitar
- Years active: 2018–present
- Label: A.S.A.B
- Website: miyunamiyuna.com

Miyuna (みゆな; born June 7, 2002) is a Japanese singer-songwriter. She was born in the Miyazaki Prefecture. She is signed to the record label A.S.A.B, a subsidiary of Avex.

== Early life ==
Miyuna has familiarized herself with rock, soul and pop music since she was a child. At a young age, she listened to Western music such as Whitney Houston and Michael Jackson that her parents played in the car, and Hibari Misora, which her grandmother liked. Born with a natural husky voice, she could not sing like everyone else in elementary school music class. Because of this, she started voice training at the chorus club and a local music school.

In middle school, Miyuna broke her hip bone during track-and-field club activities. During the rehabilitation, she entered a singing audition and proceeded to the national level. Although Miyuna did not win the award, she caught the eye of musicians and began to attend vocal lessons and perform at events mainly in Fukuoka. In the third year of junior high school, she started playing the electric-acoustic guitar.

== Career ==
Miyuna found mainstream success with her first two singles, "Gamushara" and "Tenjou Tenge", which were used as opening and ending themes for the anime Black Clover. Her third single, "Boku to Kimi no Lullaby" was used as the ending theme for Fairy Tail, and the fourth single, "Yurareru", was used as the theme song for the 2019 Japanese remake of the Korean film Blind. She continues to release demos for her songs on the independent Japanese music platform Eggs.

== Discography ==
=== Mini-Albums ===
- Me (眼; Eye) (2019)
- Yurareru (ユラレル) (2019)
- Reply (2020)

=== Singles ===
- "Gamushara" (ガムシャラ) (2018, 5th opening theme for Black Clover)
- "Tenjou Tenge" (天上天下) (2018, 5th ending theme for Black Clover)
- Boku to Kimi no Lullaby" (僕と君のララバイ, Boku to Kimi no Rarabai) (2019, 3rd ending theme for Fairy Tail season 9)
- Yurareru (ユラレル) (2019)
- "Color" (2019, ending theme for the PlayStation 4 video game SD Gundam G Generation Cross Rays)
- "My Life" (2020)
- "Soleil" (ソレイユ, Soreiyu) (2020)
- "Ano Neko no Hanashi" (あのねこの話) (2020, feat. Kai Kubota)

=== Collaborations ===
- Prism (プリズム) (2020)

=== Demos ===
- "Fuwafuwa" (ふわふわ) (2018)
- "Gamushara" (ガムシャラ) (2018)
- "Tenjou Tenge" (天上天下) (2018)
- "Zero-gatsu zero-nichi" (0月0日) (2018)
- "Kuchinashi no Kotoba" (くちなしの言葉) (2019)
- "Boku to Kimi no Lullaby" (僕と君のララバイ, Boku to Kimi no Rarabai) (2019)
- "Ikinakya" (生きなきゃ) (2019)
- "Kan Biiru" (缶ビール) (2019)
- "Onegai" (願い) (2019)
- "Yurareru" (ユラレル) (2019)
- "Guruguru" (グルグル) (2019)
- "Yurareru" (Studio Live) (ユラレル (Studio Live)) (2019)
- "Susume" (進め) (2019)
