= Irie Hakō =

Japanese painter (1887–1948)

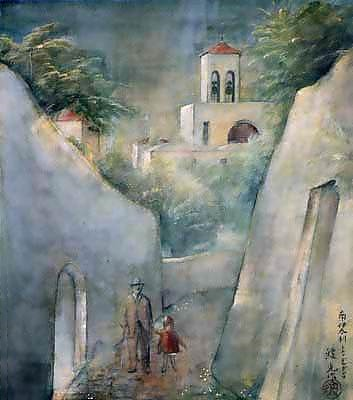
Landscape in Europe

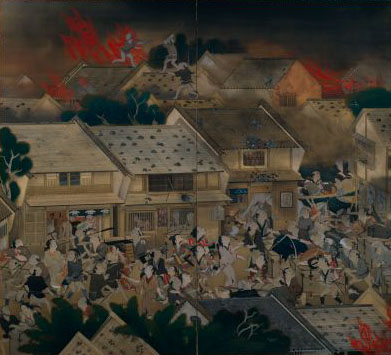
The Great Fire

Irie Hakō, originally Ikujirō (Japanese:入江 波光; 26 September 1887 – 9 June 1948), was a Japanese painter in the nihonga style.

== Life and work ==
He was born in Kyoto. He received his first painting lessons from Morimoto Tōkaku (1877–1947) in 1902. This followed by studies at the Municipal School for Arts and Crafts (now part of the Kyoto City University of Arts). After graduating in 1907, he worked at the school for two years, then moved to the new City College of Art (now also part of the City University). In 1913, the school sent him to Tokyo to gain experience at the local art schools and the Imperial Museum (now the Tokyo National Museum). There, he copied the works of Katsukawa Shunshō and created a large painting depicting the Great fire of Meireki.

In 1918, Sakakibara Shihō and Kagaku Murakami invited him to participate in the exhibitions of the National Artists' Association (国画創作協会). He presented several works at both their second and third exhibitions. In 1922, the city of Kyoto financed a trip to Europe, where he studied the Old Masters in Italy and Spain.

Later, the Ministry of Culture assigned him to work at the Hōryū-ji temple in Nara Prefecture, copying and helping to restore the murals in the main hall. He started on the project in 1940, but it was still not completed when he died of stomach cancer in 1948 in Kyoto.

== Sources ==
- "Irie Hakō" In: Kyōto no Nihonga 1910–1930 (exhibition catalog). National Museum of Modern Art, Kyoto, 1986. ISBN 4-87642-117-X.
- Laurance P. Roberts: "Irie Hakō". In: A Dictionary of Japanese Artists. Weatherhill, 1976. ISBN 0-8348-0113-2.
