= Iroha (album) =

Studio album by Chirinuruwowaka
- Released: 28 September 2005
- Genre: J-Rock
- Label: Toshiba EMI

Chirinuruwowaka chronology
| Iroha (2005) | Shiro Ana (2011) |

Iroha is the debut album from Japanese rock band Chirinuruwowaka. Limited first press editions were housed in a special slip case.

== Track listing ==
1. Kasugai (カスガイ Pledge of Love)
2. Hanamuke (はなむけ Farewell Gift)
3. Taruto (タルト Tart)
4. Koke No Mushita Konna Yo Wa (苔の生したこんな代は; This Generation is Growing Moss)
5. Cigar (シガー)
6. Hai To Rou (灰と朗 Ash and Calm)
7. Kagerou (蜻蛉 Mayfly)
8. Noironiteiru (ノイロニテイル Similar Colors)
9. Shikon Noise (紫紺ノイズ Blue Violet Noise)
10. Yosuga (ヨスガ Reliable)
11. Konohagisu (コノハギス Like Floating Leaves)
12. Nazuki (なずき Brain)
