= Akiko Noma =

Akiko Noma 野間 亜紀子
- Also known as: Akko
- Born: Akiko Hamada; 13 February 1980 (age 46); Kagoshima, Japan
- Genres: J-Pop, rock
- Instrument: Bass guitar
- Years active: 1998–present
- Labels: EMI Music Japan; BM Tunes
- Formerly of: GO!GO!7188; Piggy Banks; Tokyo Killer

Akiko Noma (野間 亜紀子, born February 13, 1980), best known as Akko, was the bassist, back-up vocalist, and lyricist of GO!GO!7188. She has also released two solo albums under her maiden name Akiko Hamada (浜田 亜紀子). She sings, writes lyrics, and composes music. After getting married in October 2006, she changed her surname from Hamada to Noma (野間).

== Early life ==
While attending Shoyo High School in Kagoshima, she met Yumi Nakashima and together they formed Jellyfish, a Judy and Mary cover band composed of five girls including Akiko. When Jellyfish broke up a few years later, Yumi and Akiko would remain together and in 1998 formed the rock band GO!GO!7188.

== Career ==
In 2003, she released her first solo album, Kirari (キラリ), on BM Tunes. 2005 saw the release of her second album, Aruyoude Naiyoude, Arumono (あるようでないようで、あるもの) on EMI Japan.

Following the breakup of GO!GO!7188, Noma was invited by Keme to join her instrumental surf rock group Tokyo Killer, which was originally formed around 2004. Noma had previously heard the band's 2012 record Tokyo Killer and expressed her interest in joining them. They released their first album, Tokyo ★ Killer Street, in April 2015. The album contained both original tracks and covers, including songs by Link Wray and Zunō Keisatsu. Prior to the 2019 release of Tokyo Killer's second album, Boom Go!!, Noma went on maternity leave and was replaced by Tarō Katō of Beat Crusaders. However, she did contribute parts to two songs on the album.

In 2014, Noma formed the band Piggy Banks along with Yoko Yazawa and Keme. They released their first album in 2016, titled Time Thriller. That same year, Noma took a break from performing with the group following her second pregnancy. In 2018, she announced that she was leaving the band.

In October 2018, a track co-written by Noma was used as the opening theme for the fifth cours of the Black Clover anime adaptation. The song, "Reckless" (ガムシャラ, Gamushara), was written along with Haneda Narita (of the band Passepied) and Miyuna, who performed it.

== Discography ==
1. Kirari (October 13, 2003)
2. Aruyoude Naiyoude, Arumono (November 2, 2005)
