= Yumi Nakashima =

Yumi Nakashima 中島 優美
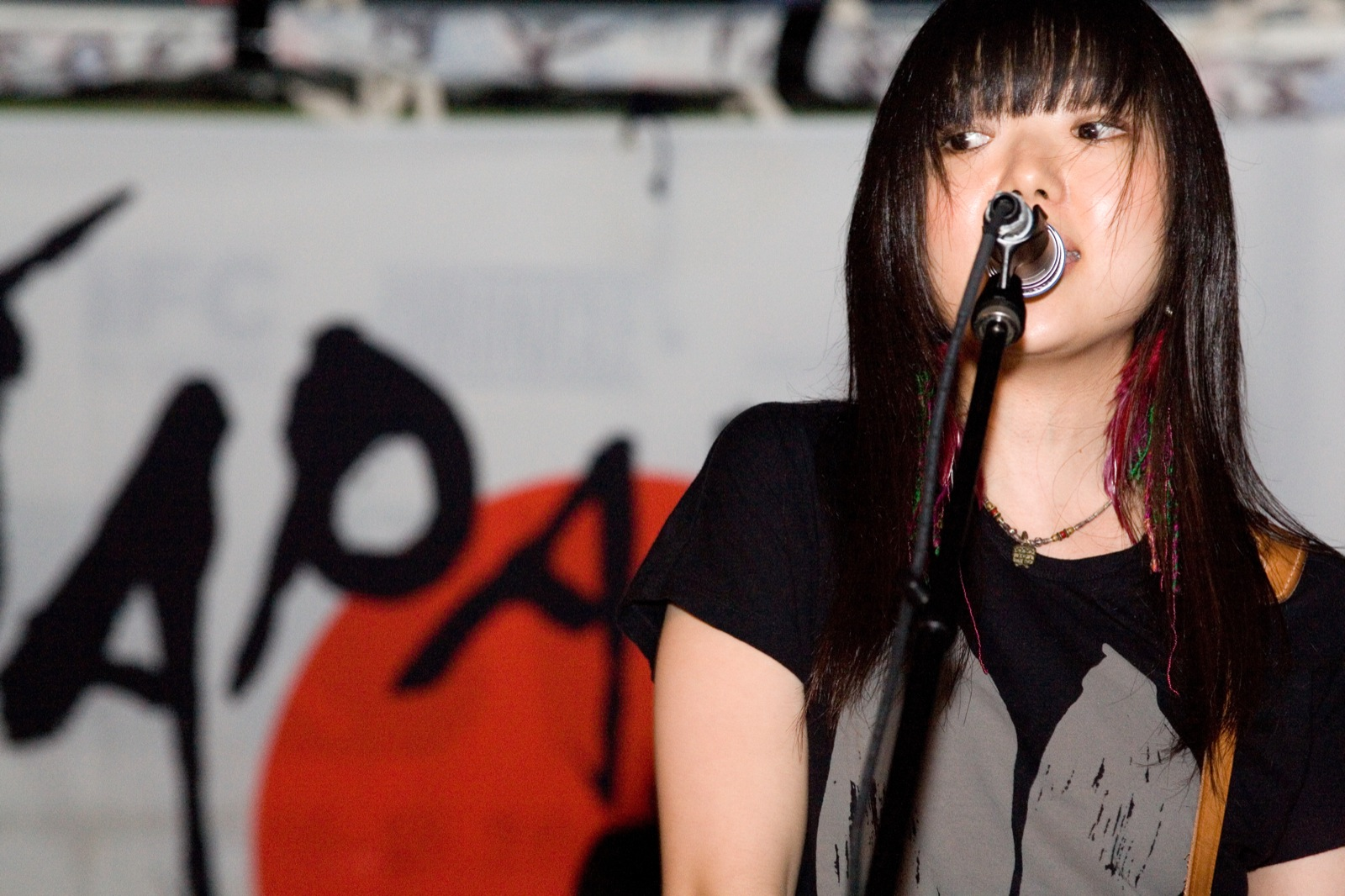
- Nakashima performing at SXSW Japan Nite in 2007

Background information
- Also known as: Yuu
- Born: December 1, 1979 (age 46); Kagoshima, Japan
- Genres: Pop; rock
- Instruments: Guitar; vocals
- Years active: 1998–present
- Labels: EMI Music Japan; Yamamichi
- Member of: Chirinuruwowaka; Yayyay
- Formerly of: GO!GO!7188

Yumi Nakashima (中島優美, Nakashima Yumi; born December 1, 1979) is a Japanese vocalist, guitarist and singer-songwriter. She was the guitarist and main vocalist in the rock band GO!GO!7188 and is the founding member of Chirinuruwowaka. Nakashima has also released two solo albums since 2004.

== Early life ==
Nakashima's interest in music started in middle school after hearing her older sister's cassette tape of the song "Shima Uta" by rock band The Boom. The following year, in 1993, Nakashima attended The Boom's concert at the Kagoshima Citizen's Cultural Hall and was inspired to form a band once in high school.

== Career ==
February 2004 saw the release of Nakashima's debut solo album, Ten no Mikaku. While she wrote the music and lyrics for all the songs featured on it, the record contained contributions from other musicians, such as Hiromasa Yamakawa of The Boom. The album reached a top position of 43 on the Oricon chart, where it stayed for three weeks. The following year, Nakashima formed Chirinuruwowaka after finding that she preferred to work with a band as opposed to being solo.

In 2019, Kazushi Tanaka (with whom Nakashima had previously worked on Ten no Mikaku) invited her to do some work on the third album of his Shizuka Kanata project. Tanaka also brought in Anzu Suzuhara and Junpei Hayashida to contribute to the songs. Eventually, they decided to form a band, naming it Yayyay. The group released their first mini album, I'm Here, in October 2020.

In October 2021, Nakashima appeared on the Music Station 35th anniversary special as part of Elopers, a band formed by Ringo Sheena just for the event, along with Aina the End, Shiori Sekine, Hona Ikoka and Sheena herself. The group performed the Tokyo Jihen song "Gunjō Biyori" with Nakashima on guitar.

== Discography ==
=== Albums ===
- Ten no Mikaku (March 1, 2004)
- Yuu's Chicken Katsu (September 20, 2014)
