= Pochi (song) =

Single by misono

from the album Sei -say-
- B-side: "11 Eleven"
- Released: May 16, 2007
- Recorded: 2007
- Genre: J-pop
- Label: Avex Trax
- Songwriter: misono

Misono singles chronology
"Hot Time/A. (Answer)" (2007)	"Pochi" (2007)	"Zasetsu Chiten" (2007)

Pochi (ポチ) is the sixth single by Japanese artist misono and first bringing in her new era after her first studio album Never+Land. The single charted at No. 36 on the Oricon charts and remained on the charts for two weeks.

== Background ==
Pochi is the sixth single by Japanese singer-songwriter misono. It was her first single after the release of her fairy tale-themed studio album Never+Land. The single became her first to rank outside of the top 20, coming in at No. 36 and only remaining on the charts for two weeks. The single was released in both standard CD and a CD+DVD combo. Both editions carried the title track and b-side, along with their corresponding instrumentals. The DVD contained the music video for the title track.

Unlike the singles that led into her debut album, Pochi did not carry a fairy tale theme. Instead, the music video carried a theme of a dog, named "Pochi," who loved their owner. Throughout the video, misono is shown to be a humanized version of a dog who adores their owner and waits for them to come home when they leave. The lyrics mirrored the video, with the song being about waiting for a partner or lover to hurry and return home after they've left for the day.

"Pochi" was written by musical composer UMU with the lyrics written by misono. The song was more rock-oriented than her previous singles, showing a genre direction misono would continue to use for the rest of her career.

The single's b-side, "11 eleven," was a cover of the Cyber X (サイバー・X) song of the same name. Cyber X originally featured misono in the song when it was released in 2003, when misono was still the lead vocalist of the band day after tomorrow. The song was written by day after tomorrow's songwriter Masato Kitano and arranged by Kotaro Kubota. Kotaro had originally worked with misono on her debut single VS.

The name "Pochi" is a typical name for a dog in Japan, much how the name "Spot" is in English speaking countries. The name translates to "pooch".

To help promote the single, a signed poster was included for those who saw the drama Delicious Gakuin (美味(デリシャス)學院 / Uma Gakuin).

== Change in musical style ==
Unlike her previous singles and songs from her previous album never+land, "Pochi" carried more of a punk rock element, instead of the pop/rock blend she had been using. The musical composition of "Pochi" focused more on the use of the electric guitar and bass guitar, versus the two instruments being dominated by synth-pop. misono had worked with this genre with her single Kojin Jugyō, which had been a rock cover of the 1973 song by pop group Finger 5.

The musical style used in "Pochi" would be the style misono would adapt into her future singles and albums, becoming the genre she would be most synonymous with as a soloist. This was further evidenced by her following single, Zasetsu Chiten, which carried elements of hard rock, and her collaboration in 2009 with her sister Kumi Koda for the song "It's All Love!." For the latter track, both sisters adopted misono's style and genre.

== Track listing ==
CD
No.	Title	Lyrics	Music	Arranger(s)	Length
1.	"Pochi" (ポチ)	misono	UMU	UMU	3:50
2.	"11 eleven"	misono	Kubota Kotaro	Masato Kitano	4:11
3.	"Pochi" (Instrumental)		UMU	UMU	3:50
4.	"11 eleven" (Instrumental)		Kubota Kotaro	Masato Kitano	4:09

DVD
No.	Title	Length
1.	"Pochi" (Video Clip)

== Chart Run ==
Week	Rank	Sales
1	36	3,193

Total sales: 4,142
