= Speedrive =

"Speedrive" "スピードライブ"

Single by misono

from the album Never+Land
- Released: July 12, 2006
- Recorded: 2006
- Genre: J-Pop
- Label: Avex Trax
- Songwriters: misono, Kōichi Tsutaya
- Producer: Max Matsuura

Misono singles chronology
"Kojin Jugyō" (2006)	"Speedrive" "スピードライブ" (2006)	"Lovely Cat's Eye" (2006)

Alternative cover
- CD+DVD

Speedrive is the third solo single by the former lead vocalist of the group Day After Tomorrow, misono. The single debuted at No. 13 on the Oricon charts, becoming her lowest-ranking single at the time. It became her first single in which she performed on live television; she performed the song on both Music Fighter and MelodiX! during the month of July.

The title track was used as the opening theme to the Japanese film Love Com.

== Background ==
Speedrive (スピードライブ) is the third single released by Japanese singer-songwriter misono. The single debuted at No. 13 on the Oricon Singles Charts, but dropped to No. 21 for the weekly ranking. Despite charting low, it remained on the charts for six consecutive weeks. At the time, this was her lowest-ranking single. The single was released as both a standard CD and a CD+DVD combo.

"Speedrive" kept the fairy tale theme set by her previous singles "VS" and "Kojin Jugyo," this time taking on the Hans Christian Andersen's 1843 story of The Ugly Duckling. While the original story was about an unattractive duckling who grows into a beautiful swan, in misono's version, she wants to be like the swan, who is deemed to be the most beautiful. For the b-side, "Ari to Kirigirisu ~10 years later~" (アリとキリギリス / The Ant and the Grasshopper), instead of taking from a fairy tale, misono chose to use the Aesop fable The Ant and the Grasshopper. The story was about a grasshopper who spends its days in the summer singing, while the ant prepares for the inevitable winter. As winter draws closer, the grasshopper realizes he has not stored any food and will surely die. Knowing this, the grasshopper begs the ant for help, but the ant refuses. Although taking inspiration from the fable, the lyrics to "Ari no Kirigirisu ~10 years later~" were about a young child enjoying life from the time they were small until they were old in age.

For "Speedrive," misono worked with composer Koichi Tsutaya, who is best known for his work with fellow avex artists Yuna Ito and AAA. While the music was composed by Koichi, it was performed and arranged by Takahiro Izutani, who misono worked with for both "VS" and "Kojin Jugyō." Takahiro is also known for his musical composition for the Tales of role-playing video game series, including Tales of the Tempest. "Ari to Kirigirsu ~10 years later~" was written and composed by Yozo Nakatsugawa.

"Speedrive" became the first song misono performed on live television, performing it on Music Fighter on July 8, and on MelodiX! on July 22. The title track was used as the opening theme song to the romantic comedy film Love★Com (ラブ★コン), which was the live action adaptation of the manga Lovely Complex.

== Music video ==
Keeping in line with her previous music videos, the video for "Speedrive" was also centered around a fairy tale, this time taking on the story of The Ugly Duckling.

For "Speedrive," misono used chroma key, much how her sister, Kumi Koda, did for her song "Wind," which was released in February of the same year. In the video, misono is dressed as a gray duckling. During her walk through the city, she continues to fall into misfortune as she idolizes the white swan, who appears to be famous and well-known. Despite harboring constant bad luck, she continues to help other people in trouble or who are feeling down. Finally feeling defeated by her consistent misfortune, she is rewarded of her good deeds by becoming like the white swan she had looked up to.

There were two different renditions of the video; the standard music video which was released on the CD+DVD combo, and a version compiled of clips from the movie Love Com.

== Track listing ==
CD
No.	Title	Lyrics	Music	Arranger(s)	Length
1.	"Speedrive" (スピードライブ)	misono	Takahiro Izutani	Koichi Tsutaya	4:24
2.	"Ari no Kirigirisu ~10 years later~" (アリとキリギリス / Ant and the Grasshopper)	misono	Yozo Nakatsugawa	Yozo Nakatsugawa	4:23
3.	"Speedrive" (Instrumental)		Takahiro Izutani	Koichi Tsutaya	4:24
4.	"Ari no Kirigirisu ~10 years later~" (Instrumental)		Yozo Nakatsugawa	Yozo Nakatsugawa	4:26

DVD
No.	Title	Length
1.	"Speedrive" (Video Clip)

== Live performances ==
- July 8, 2006 – Music Fighter
- July 22, 2006 – MelodiX!

== Charts ==
=== Oricon Sales Chart (Japan) ===
Release	Chart	Peak position	Sales total	Chart run
July 12, 2006	Oricon Daily Singles Chart	13		
July 12, 2006	Oricon Weekly Singles Chart	21	16,145 copies	5 weeks
