= Tales DS =

Tales DS may refer to the following:

- Tales of the Tempest, the first game in the Tales series to be released on the Nintendo DS.
- Tales of Innocence, the second game in the Tales series to be released on the Nintendo DS.
- Tales of Hearts, the third game in the Tales series to be released on the Nintendo DS.
