= Hot Time/A. (Answer) =

"Hot Time / A.__~answer~"

Single by misono

from the album Never+Land and Sei -say-
- Released: February 7, 2007
- Recorded: 2007
- Genre: J-pop
- Label: Avex Trax
- Songwriter(s): Misono

Misono singles chronology
| "Lovely Cat's Eye" (2006) | "Hot Time / A.__~answer~" (2007) | "Pochi" (2007) |

Alternative cover
- CD+DVD

Alternative cover
- "Girls meet Beauty" Version

Hot Time / A.__~answer~ (ホットタイム／A. 〜answer〜) is Japanese singer-songwriter misono's fifth solo single and last single before the release of her debut studio album Never+Land. The single was the artist's first attempt at a double a-side, in which both "Hot Time" and "A.__~answer~" contained music videos. The single debuted at No. 22 on the Oricon charts and remained on the charts for four consecutive weeks.

The single is misono's first release since her weight-loss success on the program Girls meet Beauty, and the music video for "A.__~answer~" was of misono's journey through the program. She would release a different version of a music video for the song on her album never+land.

== Information ==
Hot Time/A.__~answer~ is the fifth single by Japanese soloist misono, released on February 7, 2007. It was her final single before the release of her first studio album, the fairy tale-themed Never+Land. The single peaked at No. 22 on the Oricon Singles Charts and remained on the charts for one month, selling over 8,000 units.

The single was initially released as a standalone CD and a CD+DVD combo. It became her first double a-side, with music videos being produced for both "Hot Time" and "A.__~answer~." As with her previous singles, "Hot Time" carried a fairy tale theme, this time taking from the 1845 Hans Christian Andersen story of The Little Match Girl. While the video for "A.__~answer~" was the coupling a-side, the music video placed on the single was of misono's weight-loss journey through the program Girls meet Beauty. A fairy tale version of the video would be placed on her album never+land, however, with the video taking inspiration from Peter Pan.

"Hot Time" was written by musical composer Yasuhiro Abe, who debuted in the music scene in 1982. Hideyuki "Daichi" Suzuki performed the instrumentals for the song, while misono wrote the lyrics. Hideyuki has also worked with the likes of Maki Goto and AAA. For "A.__~answer~," misono wrote the lyrical portion and composed the music. The music was performed by Akria Murata of Diamond Head. Akira was best known as the keyboardist and sound producer for the band. misono had previously worked Susumu Nishikawa, who had also been part of Diamond Head.

To help promote the single, the music video for "Hot Time" was released for the holiday season in December, most likely due to the story of The Little Match Girl taking place between Christmas and New Year's Eve.

== Girls meet Beauty ==
Prior to the single's release, misono took part in the weight loss reality program Girls meet Beauty. The program was a three-month duration in which the patient would closely monitor their calorie intake and increase their overall exercise regimen.

Beginning in October 2006, the Takano Yuri Beauty Clinic collaborated with avex&EAST for the Girls meet Beauty program. For the program, female avex artists across Japan with certain body types were selected. Those chosen were placed on a special diet for three consecutive months and they were monitored to make sure they stayed with the program.

The show was broadcast on MTV Japan with misono as the program's lead. For Girls meet Beauty, they collected information about the artist's size and overall body fat percentage. All of the information was published live so true weight loss results could be shown.

Throughout her time in the program, misono's overall body weight fell from 56.2 kg to 48.5 kg. She lost a total of 7.8 centimeters from her waist and dropped her overall body fat percentage to 22.7% from her starting percentage of 32.1%.

== Packaging ==
Hot Time/A.__~answer~ was released in three separate editions: CD, CD+DVD and a limited CD+DVD edition featuring different cover art.

The CD on all editions carried both a-sides, "Hot Time" and "A.__~answer~," along with their corresponding instrumentals. The DVD carried both music videos, with "Hot Time" taking on the fairy tale of The Little Match Girl and "A.__~answer~" being the promotional song for the Japanese weight-loss program Girls meet Beauty.

Later on, an alternate version of the CD+DVD combo was released, with misono posing on the cover after her successful weight-loss. This was in lieu of the original cover, which harbored red matches instead of the blue depicted on the CD only edition.

== Music video ==
Keeping in-tune with the fairy tale-themed videos released during her never+land era, the first A-side on the single, "Hot Time", carried the story of The Little Match Girl. The video opens with misono in a glass lantern, crying after being thrown outside to sell the matches. As she lights the matches to stay warm, it shows the illusion of her breaking off binds, symbolizing her biggest dream is for freedom from the life she currently has. The symbolism of hair cutting is also used, which, in many East Asian cultures signifies "starting over" and "cutting away the past". However, while the short story ends with the young girl freezing to death in the snow, misono's version ends with her still outside, trapped in the lantern.

Unlike the other videos, the music video for "A.__~answer~" was not centered on a fairy tale and was, instead, compiled of clips from misono's weight-loss journey on the Girls meet Beauty program. The video opens with her in the studio's recording booth before jumping to clips of her prior to the program. She laments over how she had gained weight since her debut and is willing to get back into shape. It shows some of the moments she had struggled with the diet, as well as her milestone of being the first to finish in a company run.

An alternate version of "A.__~answer~" was later released on her album never+land, this time carrying the theme of Peter Pan. For the album version, it shows how Peter comes back to visit Wendy, but Wendy can no longer see him because she has grown old. The video shows how they would talk and play when Wendy was younger and how Peter gave her the feather from his hat to remember her by.

== Track listing ==
CD
| No. | Title | Lyrics | Music | Arranger(s) | Length |
|---|---|---|---|---|---|
| 1. | "Hot Time" (ホットタイム) | misono | Hideyuki "Daichi" Suzuki | Yasuhiro Abe |
| 2. | "A.__~answer~" | misono | Akira Murata | misono |
| 3. | "Hot Time" (Instrumental) | | Hideyuki "Daichi" Suzuki | Yasuhiro Abe |
| 4. | "A.__~answer~" (Instrumental) | | misono | Akira Murata |

DVD
| No. | Title | Length |
|---|---|---|
| 1. | "Hot Time" (Video Clip) |
| 2. | "A.__~answer~" (Video Clip) |

== Chart ranking ==
| Week | Rank | Sales |
|---|---|---|
| 1 | 22 | 5,835 |
| 2 | 71 | 1,509 |
| 3 | 150 | 655 |
| 4 | 186 | 446 |

Total sales: 8,445
