= Mugen Kigen =

Single by misono

from the album Sei -say-
- B-side: "Last Song"
- Released: January 30, 2008
- Recorded: 2007
- Genre: J-Pop, pop/rock
- Label: Avex Trax
- Songwriter: misono

Misono singles chronology
"Juunin Toiro" (2007)	"Mugen Kigen" (2008)	"Ninin Sankyaku" (2008)

Mugen Kigen (夢幻期限 / Fantasy Era) is the ninth single by Japanese soloist misono. The single charted low on the Oricon charts, taking No. 32 for the week, and remaining on the charts for two weeks.

The single became her third in her Rock Singles Project, a project in which she released four different rock-themed singles with four different Japanese rock bands. For Mugen Kigen, misono worked with Japanese band Onsoku Line.

== Information ==
Mugen Kigen is the third single by Japanese singer-songwriter misono for her Rock Singles Project, and her ninth overall single. The two prior singles for the project were Zasetsu Chiten and Juunin Toiro. For this single, misono worked with Onsoku Line (Japanese: 音速ライン / English: onoso9line) and their vocalist and guitarist Yoshiyuki Fujii.

Despite debuting at No. 15 on the Oricon Singles Charts, it became her lowest ranking single in the collection, charting at No. 32 for the weekly ranking. As with both Zasetsu Chiten and Juunin Toiro, Mugen Kigen charted for two consecutive weeks. The single was released as both a standard CD and a CD+DVD combo. The CD contained the title track, the b-side "Last Song" and instrumental for "Mugen Kigen." The DVD carried the music video for "Mugen Kigen", video commentary by misono and the television commercials for the single.

"Mugen Kigen" was composed by Onsoku Line's vocalist and guitarist Yoshiyuki Fujii. The song was performed by Onsoku Line and Tanahashi "UNA" Nobuhito from the soft rock band Every Little Thing. For "Last Song," the music was again composed by Yoshiyuki Fujii and performed by Onsoku Line. misono, however, wrote the lyrics for both tracks.

An alternate version of "Last Song" would later be released on the corresponding album to the single, Sei -say-. She would also release all four songs in the project into one melody, which was also placed on the album.

== Track listing ==
CD
No.	Title	Lyrics	Music	Arranger(s)	Length
1.	"Mugen Kigen" (夢幻期限 / Fantasy Era)	misono	onso9line • Tanahashi "UNA" Nobuhito	Yoshiyuki Fujii	4:21
2.	"Last Song" (ラストソング)	misono	onso9line	Yoshiyuki Fujii	4:26
3.	"Mugen Kigen" (Instrumental)		onso9line • Tanahashi "UNA" Nobuhito	Yoshiyuki Fujii	4:20

DVD
No.	Title	Length
1.	"Mugen Kigen" (Music Video)
2.	"misono Comment Video" (misonoコメント映像)
3.	"Mugen Kigen" (TV Spot 15sec + 30sec)	0:45

== Charts ==
Oricon Sales Chart (Japan)

Release	Chart	Peak position	First week sales	Sales total	Chart run
2008.01.30	Oricon Daily Charts	21		3,002	2 weeks
