= Juunin Toiro =

Single by misono

from the album Sei -say-
- B-side: "black & white ~Kuroi Sunglasses Kaketa Hi Kara~"
- Released: November 14, 2007
- Genre: J-pop, pop/rock
- Label: Rhythm Zone (Japan)
- Composer: GO!GO!7188
- Lyricist: misono
- Producer: GO!GO!7188

Misono singles chronology
"'Zasetsu Chiten'" (2007)	"Juunin Toiro" (2007)	"'Mugen Kigen'" (2008)

Juunin Toiro (十人十色 / Ten People, Ten Colors) is the eighth domestic single release by pop/rock artist misono. The single peaked at #21 on the Oricon charts, but dropped in rank to take the #47 slot for the week.

The single became her second in her Rock Singles Project, a project in which she released four different rock-themed singles with four different Japanese rock bands. For this single, she worked with GO!GO!7188, who performed the music, written by their vocalist Yumi Nakashima.

== Background information ==
Juunin Toiro is the second single released by Japanese soloist misono for her Rock Singles Project, the first being Zasetsu Chiten. For the project, misono performed four rock-themed singles with four different Japanese rock groups. For this single, misono worked with GO!GO!7188, which was formed by Shoyo High School alumnae Yumi Nakashima and Akiko Hamada in 1998.

This single debuted at #21 on the Oricon Singles Charts, but dropped in rank to take #47 for the weekly ranking. As with Zasetsu Chiten, the single remained on the charts for two consecutive weeks. Juunin Toiro was released in two editions, CD and CD+DVD. The CD contained the title track, along with the b-side "GizaGiza Life" (ギザギザLIFE / Jagged Life) and the corresponding instrumentals. The DVD carried the music video for "Juunin Toiro," video commentary by misono and the television commercials for the single.

Both "Juunin Toiro" and "GizaGiza Life" were written by GO!GO!7188's vocalist and musical composer Yumi Nakashima, while the songs were performed by the band. misono, however, wrote the lyrics herself. "Juunin Toiro"'s title and theme were based on the Japanese proverb "Juunin toiro," which means "ten people, ten colors." The meaning being that everyone is different and has a different story. The saying comes from the Japanese word for "ten" (Juu / 十) combined with the word for "person" (nin / 人); "iro" (色) in "toiro" is the Japanese word for "color."

misono would later release all four songs in the project into one melody on her album Say -sei-.

== Music video ==
To tie into the saying, the music video for "Juunin Toiro" followed the lives of ten different people, all incarnations of misono.

The main character is a young woman reading about the lives of the others through various-colored books. Incarnations include a woman in an abusive relationship, one who gets into a fight with their friend, a woman who is found cheating with her boyfriend and a rock musician. Throughout the video, the various characters sing about their lives. The music video goes on to show both the happy and ugly sides of people, showing not to judge people because you "don't know their experiences."

== Track listing ==
CD
No.	Title	Lyrics	Music	Arranger(s)	Length
1.	"Juunin Toiro" (十人十色 / 10 People, 10 Colors)	misono	GO!GO!7188	Yumi Nakashima	4:15
2.	"GizaGiza Life" (ギザギザLIFE / Jagged Life)	misono	GO!GO!1788	Yumi Nakashima	5:24
3.	"Juunin Toiro" (Instrumental)		GO!GO!1788	Yumi Nakashima	4:14
4.	"GizaGiza Life" (Instrumental)		GO!GO!1788	Yumi Nakashima	5:22

DVD
No.	Title	Length
1.	"Juunin Toiro" (Music Video)
2.	"misono Comment Video" (misonoコメント映像)
3.	"Juunin Toiro" (TV Spot 15sec + 30sec)	0:45

== Charts ==
Oricon Sales Chart (Japan)

Release	Chart	Peak position	First week sales	Sales total	Chart run
2007.11.14	Oricon Daily Charts	21		3,211	2 weeks
