= Say (album) =

Say 生-say-

Studio album by Misono
- Released: July 16, 2008
- Recorded: 2007–2008
- Genre: J-Pop
- Label: Avex Trax; CD (AVCD-23624); CD+DVD (AVCD-23623/B)

Misono chronology
Never+Land (2007)	Say 生-say- (2008)	Tales with Misono: Best (2009)

Alternative cover
- CD+DVD

Singles from Say
- 1. "Hot Time / A.__~answer~" Released: February 7, 2007; 2. "Pochi" Released: May 16, 2007; 3. "Zasetsu Chiten" Released: September 12, 2007; 4. "Juunin Toiro" Released: November 14, 2007; 5. "Mugen Kigen" Released: January 30, 2008; 6. "Ninin Sankyaku" Released: June 28, 2008

Say (生-say- / Life -say-) is the second studio album by Japanese artist misono. It was released on July 16, 2008. The album was released in two different formats: CD only and CD+DVD. The album held the following single releases before its initial release: "Hot Time / A.__~answer~", "Pochi", "Zasetsu Chiten", "Juunin Toiro", "Mugen Kigen" and "Ninin Sankyaku". The title of the album combines the Chinese character for "life" (生) with ruby characters for the English word "say", creating a dual meaning.

The album contains all of misono's singles since Pochi up until Ninin Sankyaku, and all of those singles' a-sides and b-sides (sans "Ninin Sankyaku"'s medley). The DVD contains alternate versions of the music videos released for the singles. For example, the "Box ver." of "Zasetsu Chiten" takes place solely in the box setting of the original video.

Say made it to No. 13 on the Oricon daily charts, but dropped to No. 20 on the weekly charts.

== Background ==
Say is the second studio album released by Japanese singer-songwriter misono. The album was released a year after her debut album Never+Land. It debuted in the top twenty on the Oricon Albums Charts at No. 13, but dropped in rank to take the No. 20 slot, remaining on the charts for five consecutive weeks.

The cover for the albums, which showed misono without a shirt and holding a mask with a different expression, was done to show the success of her weight-loss after Girls meet Beauty. Initially, there were only rumors of misono going shirtless on the covers.

The album contained her singles from her Rock Singles Project, in which she released four singles written and composed by four different Japanese rock bands: "Zasetsu Chiten," "Juunin Toiro," "Mugen Kigen" and "Ninin Sankyaku." The project was done after misono's success with the Girls meet Beauty program and most likely done to help her popularity, as with what was done with her sister's, Kumi Koda's, 12 Singles Collection project between 2005 and 2006. Along with the singles from her Rock Singles Project, the album featured the songs "Hot Time," which was a single from her never+land album, and "Pochi."

"Juunin Toiro"'s title and theme was based on the Japanese proverb "juunin toiro," which means "ten people, ten colors." The meaning being that everyone is different and has a different story. The saying comes from the Japanese word for "ten" (Juu / 十) combined with the word for "person" (nin / 人); "iro" (色) in "toiro" is the Japanese word for "color." For "Zasetsu Chiten" and "black & white ~Kuroi Sunglasses Kaketa Hi Kara~," misono worked with rock band Straightener's bass guitarist, Hinata Hidekazu, who wrote and produced the songs. Takanori Ohkita performed the drums for the song and Hinata arranged and produced both "Zasetsu Chiten" and "black & white ~Kuroi Sunglasses Kaketa Hi Kara~."

Say was released in two editions: CD and a CD+DVD combo. The CD contained all of the a-sides from her singles, along with the b-sides "black & white ~Kuroi Sunglasses Kaketa Hi Kara~" from Zasetsu Chiten, "GizaGiza Life" from Juunin Toiro and "Last Song" from Mugen Kigen. It also contained six new songs, which were recorded strictly for the album. For the DVD, alternate versions of the music videos from her Rock Singles Collection were used.

== Music videos ==
For the music videos on the DVD portion of the album, alternate versions of the videos from her Rock Singles Project were used.

While the original video for "Zasetsu Chiten" carried a boxing theme, showing misono having lost a match, the version on the album was the "Box" version. This alternate rendition used only the scene of the effeminate form of misono in the box enclosure, showing her being "trapped" in the constant trying and failure. For "Juunin Toiro," instead of having one incarnation of misono reading about the lives of the others, the screen was split into ten different segments, showing all ten incarnations at once. The rendition was so-titled the "10 misono's" version.

The "painting" version of "Mugen Kigen" was a continuous shot of misono splattered with neon-colored paints. As for the album version of "Ninin Sankyaku," two alternate shots were used: the version of misono, seemingly upset, and in front of the mirror. These were the only shots used for the video.

== Track listing ==
All lyrics are written by misono (#4 was with Akiko Noma).

CD
No.	Title	Music	Arranger(s)	Length
1.	"misono-Aji" (美苑味 / Misono Flavor)	TAKUYA	SJR	1:45
2.	"Zasetsu Chiten"	Hidekazu Hinata	Hidekazu Hinata	3:46
3.	"Ninin Sankyaku"	Akio Shimizu	PLECTRUM	4:29
4.	"GizaGiza Life"	Yumi Nakashima	GO!GO!7188	5:19
5.	"black & white ~Kuroi Sunglasses Kaketa Hi Kara~"	Hidekazu Hinata	Hidekazu Hinata	3:35
6.	"Triangle"	Hidekazu Hinata	Hidekazu Hinata	4:38
7.	"Hot Time"	Yasuhiro Abe	Hideyuki "Daichi" Suzuki	5:04
8.	"Mugen Kigen"	Yoshiyuki Fujii	onso9line, Shinji "UNA" Tanahashi	4:18
9.	"Ojiichankko Obaachankko Hinatabokko" (おじぃちゃんっこ おばぁちゃんっこ ひなたぼっ子 / Grandpa and Grandma Sunbathing)	Hidekazu Hinata	Hidekazu Hinata	4:43
10.	"Pochi"	UMU	UMU	3:50
11.	"Hankouki" (反抗期 / Rebellious Age)	Taisuke Takata	PLECTRUM	2:50
12.	"Juunin Toiro"	Kōsuke Morimoto	Yukiyoshi	2:54
13.	"Tamago" (たまご / Egg)	Misono	Kōtaro Kubota	5:30
14.	"Last Song" (Sei ver.)	Yoshiyuki Fujii	onso9line	4:50
15.	"Glass" (ガラス)	Misono	Misono	3:50
Total length:				62:10

DVD
No.	Title	Length
1.	"Zasetsu Chiten ~Box ver.~" (Music Video)
2.	"Juunin Toiro ~10 misono's ver.~" (Music Video)
3.	"Mugen Kigen ~Painting ver.~" (Music Video)
4.	"Ninin Sankyaku ~Sei ver.~" (Music Video)

== Charts ==
=== Oricon Sales Chart (Japan) ===
Release	Chart	Peak position	Sales total
July 16, 2008	Oricon Daily Albums Chart	13	
July 16, 2008	Oricon Weekly Albums Chart	20	13,135
