= Kojin Jugyō =

"Kojin Jugyou"

Single by misono

from the album never+land
- B-side: "Pinkies"
- Released: May 10, 2006
- Recorded: 2006
- Genre: J-Pop, pop/rock
- Label: Avex Trax; CD (AVCD-30966); CD+DVD (AVCD-30965/B)
- Songwriters: Kojin Jugyou / Yū Aku; Pinkies / misono

Misono singles chronology
"VS" (2006)	"Kojin Jugyou" (2006)	"Speedrive" (2006)

Alternative cover
- CD+DVD

Kojin Jugyou (個人授業 / Private Lessons) is the second solo single by former lead vocalist of day after tomorrow, misono. The single peaked on the Oricon charts at No. 15 and remained on the charts for four weeks.

The title track is a cover of the song of the same name originally by Japanese group Finger 5.

== Information ==
Kojin Jugyou is the second solo single by Japanese singer-songwriter misono, the former lead vocalist of the Japanese band day after tomorrow. The single performed well, debuting at No. 8 on the Oricon Singles Charts and taking No. 15 for the weekly ranking, remaining on the charts for four consecutive weeks. Despite performing well, it did not surpass the ranking or sales of her debut single, VS, which peaked at No. 4.

The title track was a cover of the 1973 song "Kojin Jugyou" by Japanese group pop group Finger 5, which was made up of Okinawan siblings Kazuo, Mitsuo, Masao, Akira and Taeko Tamamoto. The song has been covered by an array of other artists, including Momoe Yamaguchi and Junko Sakurada. "Kojin Jugyou's" lyrics were written by Yuu Aku, who had been in the industry since the 1960s. The song was originally composed by Shunichi Tokura. For misono's version, Takahiro Izutani arranged the music. Takahiro had previously worked with misono for her debut single VS, and composed the music for the Tales of the Tempest Nintendo DS role-playing video game.

The single's coupling track, "Pinkies," (stylized as pinkies) was written and composed by Takahiro Izutani, with misono having written the lyrical portion.

Keeping in theme with her previous single, the music video for "Kojin Jugyou" carried a fairy tale theme, this time taking inspiration from the story of Cinderella, most likely inspired by the 1950 film adaptation by The Walt Disney Company. In the video, misono is shown to be unkempt and wanting to gain the affection of her crush, who's always surrounded by her female peers. A fairy hears her plea and comes to help, transforming her into a modern-day princess. misono's sister Koda Kumi would take inspiration from the video for her song "Koi no Tsubomi," which also featured a small fairy granting desires.

To help promote the single, "Kojin Jugyou" was used as the ending theme for the Nippon Television series Miracle☆Shape (ミラクル☆シェイプ) throughout the month of May.

== Music video ==
As with her previous single, "VS", "Kojin Jugyou" held a fairy tale theme, this time taking inspiration from the classic tale of Cinderella.

The music video opens with misono playing baseball in the hall with some of her male peers, when the student she has affection for walks by, surrounded by his female peers. Too nervous to approach him due to her unkempt appearance, she prays that night. A small fairy comes to grant her wish, transforming her into a modern-day Cinderella. The following day, she tries to gain her crush's attention, but he is always surrounded by other girls and she's unable to approach him. The small fairy constantly tells her throughout the video that she must hurry, since the magic is temporary. Finally able to get her crush alone in the library, the magic vanishes when she approaches him and she runs off, embarrassed. The video ends with her, in her standard appearance, gaining the courage to talk to him when he's at his locker.

misono's older sister, Koda Kumi, would take inspiration from the video for her song "Koi no Tsubomi". However, where misono's video ends with the fairy's magic wearing off, Kumi's video would end with the fairy's magic being permanent.

== Track listing ==
CD
No.	Title	Lyrics	Music	Arranger(s)	Length
1.	"Kojin Jugyou" (個人授業 / Private Lessons)	Yuu Aku	Shunichi Tokura	Takahiro Izutani	4:26
2.	"pinkies"	misono	Takahiro Izutani	Takahiro Izutani	5:18
3.	"Kojin Jugyou" (Instrumental)		Shunichi Tokura	Takahiro Izutani	4:27
4.	"pinkies" (Instrumental)		Takahiro Izutani	Takahiro Izutani	5:15

DVD
No.	Title	Length
1.	"Kojin Jugyou" (Video Clip)

== Charts ==
=== Oricon Sales Chart (Japan) ===
Release	Chart	Peak position	Sales total	Chart run
May 10, 2006	Oricon Daily Singles Chart	8		
May 10, 2006	Oricon Weekly Singles Chart	15	16,223 copies	4 weeks
May 10, 2006	Oricon Monthly Singles Chart			
May 10, 2006	Oricon Yearly Singles Chart			
