= Never+Land =

never+land

Studio album by Misono
- Released: February 28, 2007
- Recorded: 2006–2007
- Genre: J-Pop, pop/rock
- Length: 52:19
- Label: Avex Trax; CD (AVCD-23204); CD+DVD (AVCD-23203); CD+Photobook (AVCD-23202)

Misono chronology
never+land (2007)	Sei -say- (2008)

Alternative cover
- CD+DVD

Singles from never+land
- 1. "VS" Released: March 29, 2006; 2. "Kojin Jugyō" Released: May 10, 2006; 3. "Speedrive" Released: July 12, 2006; 4. "Lovely♥Cat's Eye" Released: November 1, 2006; 5. "Hot Time/A.__~answer~" Released: February 7, 2007

Never+Land (stylized as never+land) is the debut studio album by Japanese vocalist Koda Misono, former vocalist of day after tomorrow, under the stage name "misono." The album was released on February 28, 2007, following the released of five singles, and charted at No. 20 on the Oricon weekly charts.

== Information ==
never+land is the debut studio album of Japanese singer-songwriter misono. It was her first album since the disbandment of day after tomorrow, of which misono was the lead vocalist. The album debuted high on the Oricon Albums Charts, coming it at #8; however, the album dropped in rank throughout the week, giving the album the weekly ranking of No. 20. It stayed on the charts for three consecutive weeks.

Staying true to the title, never+land was an album centered around a fairy tale theme, with many of the songs' being homages to various famous fairy tales. The album's title and artwork was a take on Neverland from the tale of Peter Pan, most notably from the 1953 film of the same name released by The Walt Disney Company. Many of the adaptations were in reference to Disney's films. Her first single for the album, "VS," was centered around the fairy tale of Snow White, with misono playing both the character Snow White and the evil queen. Throughout the song, the evil queen would set traps, which Snow White would find and turn against her. Her second song, "Kojin Jugyō," was a take on Cinderella, with misono being shown to have affection for a classmate, who doesn't appear to notice her. In the song, a small fairy comes to transform her, which gains the attention of her crush; but, as with the fairy tale, her transformation disappears after midnight. Her sister, Koda Kumi, would later take inspiration from this video for her song "Koi no Tsubomi."

For "Speedrive," misono performed a take on The Ugly Duckling. For the video, she used a green screen and, as the Ugly Duckling, would constantly fall into misfortune. While the song "Hot Time" was omitted on the CD, the other a-side, "A.__~answer~," was used. The song was inspired by Peter Pan and performs a take with Peter coming back to visit Wendy, who has grown old and frail and can no longer play as they did when they were children. "Hot Time," however, was a take on The Little Match Girl. For the album, only the scene where misono was thrown outside of her home by her father was used.

For track No. 10, "Five Finger Medley," misono covered an array of songs from the 1970s group Finger 5: "Kojin Jugyo," "Koi no Dial 6700," "Gakuen Tengoku" and "Koi no Daiyogen." Of the new material on the album, only the track "Suna no Shiro no Mermaid ~Riku to Umi no Sekai~" (砂の城のマーメイド～陸と海の世界～ / Sandcastle Mermaid ~World of Land and Sea~) harbored a music video. This song was also used as the main promotional single to help promote the album.

The album had drawn criticism due to it carrying little new material, with the album being predominately previous a-sides and b-sides of the previous singles, and only four new songs being released.

== Packaging ==
never+land was released in three editions: CD, CD+DVD and a CD+Photobook combo.

Both the CD and CD+DVD editions contained the same material on the CD portion. Despite the album having five singles prior to its release, only one of the videos made it to the DVD: "A.__~answer~." Instead of the Girls meet Beauty version that was used on the single, the version contained the story of Peter Pan, in which he returns to visit Wendy, who has grown old and frail and can no longer see him, despite him coming to visit her. As a bonus track, an alternate version of "Hot Time" was placed on the album. Instead of the music video carrying the full story of The Little Match Girl, the version on the album was when the girl was thrown outside in the mud by her father to sell the matches.

The DVD did contain one new music video: "Suna no Shiro no Mermaid ~Riku to Umi no Sekai~." To keep in tune with the fairy tale theme of the album, the video was centered around the fairy tale of The Little Mermaid.

For the CD+Photobook edition, the photo book contained every promotional image of misono from her time in the band day after tomorrow until the release of her solo album.

== Track listing ==
All lyrics are written by misono (#10 by Yū Aku).

CD
No.	Title	Music	Arranger(s)	Length
1.	"Powder"	Aiha Higurashi		1:44
2.	"Lovely♥Cat's Eye ~Neko wa Kotatsu de Maruku Naranai no Maki~" (ネコはコタツで丸くならないの巻 / The Cat Can't Curl Up Under the Heater Version)	Susumu Nishikawa	Susumu Nishikawa • Takahiro Izutani	4:27
3.	"Speedrive"	Kōichi Tsutaya	Takahiro Izutani	4:25
4.	"A.__~answer~"	Misono	Akira Murata	3:56
5.	"Ari to Girigirsu ~10 Years Later~"	Yōzō Nakatsugawa	Yōzō Nakatsugawa	4:23
6.	"Suna no Shiro no Mermaid ~Riku to Umi no Sekai~" (砂の城のマ－メイド〜陸と海の世界〜 / Sandcastle Mermaid ~World of Land and Sea~)	shogo.k	Akira Murata	4:13
7.	"Kodomo no Jijō>Otona no Shijō²" (子供の事情＞大人の私情² / Kid's Reasons>Adult's Feelings²)	keito blow	Susumu Nishikawa	4:00
8.	"Glass no Kutsu"	Misono	Kōtaro Kubo	5:36
9.	"VS"	Susumu Nishikawa	Takahiro Izutani	4:12
10.	" Finger 5 Medley" (Kojin Jugyō, Koi no Dial 6700, Gakuen Tengoku, Koi no Daiyogen)	Shunichi Tokura • Tadao Inoue	Takahiro Izutani	7:14
11.	"Pinkies"	Takahiro Izutani	Takahiro Izutani	5:15
12.	"Re:"	Kōsuke Morimoto	Yukiyoshi	2:54

DVD
No.	Title	Length
1.	"A.__~answer~" (Music Video)
2.	"Suna no Shiro no Mermaid ~Riku to Umi no Sekai~" (Music Video)
3.	"The Making" (Bonus Movie)
4.	"Hot Time ~Mud 1 Take ver.~" (Bonus Movie)

== Charts ==
=== Album ===
Release	Chart	Peak position	Sales total
February 28, 2007	Oricon Daily Albums Chart	8	
February 28, 2007	Oricon Weekly Albums Chart	20	12,789

=== Singles ===
Date	Title	Peak position
March 29, 2006	"Vs"	4
May 10, 2006	"Kojin Jugyō"	15
July 12, 2006	"Speedrive"	21
November 1, 2006	"Lovely Cat's Eye"	14
February 7, 2007	"Hot Time/A. (Answer)"	22
