= Aesthetic salon (Japan) =

Japanese aesthetic salons are popular establishments in Japan where men and women go to receive a great variety of mostly non-surgical beauty treatments, including hair removal, slimming treatments, and facial care. The beauty industry in Japan is extremely widespread and lucrative, grossing an approximated $4 billion per year with estimated 173,412 establishments nationwide in 2003.

== Leading salons ==
Among the leading aesthetic salons in Japan are the Tokyo Beauty Center with 417 shops and average annual sales of ¥41.7 billion ($398 million), Socie with 74 shops and average annual sales of ¥21.5 billion ($205 million), Takano Yuri Beauty Clinic with 120 shops and average annual sales of ¥16 billion ($152 million), and Slim Beauty House with 102 shops and average annual sales of ¥10.2 billion ($97 million). Not all aesthetic salons target women as their customers; the Men's Tokyo Beauty Center and other such thriving salons target male consumers. All of these salons are only one part of a multibillion-dollar beauty and cosmetics industry in Japan.

== Beauty standards ==
While there are in each culture many different ideas about what beauty is, some prominent ideals in Japanese culture include hairlessness, slimness, and having full breasts. In Japan, there are very specific, quantifiable standards for male and female beauty. Japanese salons and other forms of Japanese media promote the idea that every minute part of the body should conform to extremely specific proportions. The beauty industry also segments customers' bodies and targets specific areas as the focus of beauty treatments. Often beauty salons will chart their customer's progress on a "medical" sheet. The Yakano Yuri Beauty Clinic monitors calves, thighs, waist, and bust separately and supplies the exact quantitative change of before and after treatments. Aesthetic salons employ a huge variety of beauty treatments for their customers.

== Beauty treatments ==
For many years, Japanese have utilized many different forms of hair removal treatments. While the cosmetics industry provides every possible cream, glaze, wax, bleach, razor, etc., aesthetic salons also capitalize on Japanese women's desire to eliminate body hair. Aesthetic salons offer a variety of these treatments, seeking to eliminate almost all body hair possible using any number of methods. Common professional hair removal methods include laser hair removal, intense pulsed light (IPL), electrolysis, waxing, and threading. Electrolysis is a method of permanent hair removal that destroys individual hair follicles using a fine probe and electrical current. Threading is a technique by which hair is plucked out using a folded string.

=== Slimming ===
Slimming treatments at Japanese aesthetic salons include cellophane body wraps, massages, use of different creams and lotions and of a variety of mechanical devises said to disintegrate or melt fat away from one's body. One popular technology-based treatment involves what is called "Electrical Muscle Stimulation" (EMS), where the muscles of the body are stimulated via electrical nodes hooked up to a microcurrent-emitting machine.

=== Breast modification ===
During the 1970s, often young, childish, innocent looking women were more eroticized and there was much less emphasis on breasts as a primary marker of sexual attraction. As the culture has moved away from the "cute" aesthetic, the beauty industry in Japan has instead created a symbolic link between large, womanly chests and a sense of independence, self-assertion, and confidence. While aesthetic technicians do not perform breast augmentation surgeries, they provide other services that are meant to increase the size of the breast, even out the sizes of the breasts or create different proportions of the chest area. One example is the "Bust-up" treatment plans offered at many different aesthetic salons. The treatment typically includes massage, stimulation with suction cups attached to electrical equipment, and the use of various creams.

== Controversy ==
While aesthetic salons are extremely popular and lucrative, they often toe the line between legitimate businesses and unregulated, fraud-ridden operations. Part of the difficulty with government regulation is that 40% of these salons are less than five years old, with old shops closing down quickly and new establishments being opened constantly. In the year 2002, the Mainichi Daily News Interactive ran a story about some malpractice in Japanese aesthetic salons, including an account of a hospitalization due to a botched electrolysis treatment and a lawsuit against a salon owner who was violating the Medical Practitioners' Act by telling his staff members that anyone (regardless of lack of training) could operate laser equipment.

The report also cited an arrest of an unlicensed owner running a bogus shop out of the back of a restaurant, claiming to be able to utilize cosmic forces to remove customers' moles, and bogus practices by another salon that advertised one price for hair removal then charged a customer much more money because they claimed her hair was thicker and coarser and required extra attention. In response to these and other incidents, the Japanese government began to research ways to create a system of review for aestheticians and a way to regulate and improve salon workers' training.
