= Zasetsu Chiten =

"Zasetsu Chiten (挫折地点)"

Single by misono

from the album Sei -say-
- B-side: "black & white ~Kuroi Sunglasses Kaketa Hi Kara~"
- Released: September 12, 2007
- Genre: J-pop, pop/rock
- Label: Rhythm Zone (Japan)
- Songwriters: Hinata Hidekazu, Takanori Ohkita
- Producer: Hinata Hidekazu

Misono singles chronology
"'Pochi'" (2007)	"Zasetsu Chiten (挫折地点)" (2007)	"'Juunin Toiro'" (2007)

"Zasetsu Chiten" (挫折地点 / Failing Points) is the seventh single released by Japanese artist misono. The single peaked on the Oricon charts at #39 and remained on the charts for two weeks.

The single became the first release in her Rock Singles Project, a project in which she would release four rock-themed singles produced by four different Japanese rock bands. The project was done most likely due to the success of her sister's, Kumi Koda's, 12 Singles Collection project, in which she had released twelve singles over the course of twelve weeks.

== Background information ==
Zasetsu Chiten in Japanese pop/rock artist misono's seventh single released under the avex sub-label Rhythm Zone. The single charted at #39 on the Oricon Singles Charts and remained on the charts for two weeks. The single became the first release in her Rock Singles Project, a project in which misono would release four rock-themed singles performed and produced by four different Japanese rock bands. The project was likely due to help the artist gain more popularity as a soloist after her weight loss during Girl meet Beauty, and after noting the success of the 12 Singles Project done by her sister, Kumi Koda.

Zasetsu Chiten was released in both CD and CD+DVD editions. While the CD contained the a-side "Zasetsu Chiten" and the b-side "black & white ~Kuroi Sunglassess Kaketa Hi Kara~" along with their corresponding instrumentals, the DVD contained the music video for the title track, a video narration by misono herself, and the television commercials for the single.

For both "Zasetsu Chiten" and the b-side "black & white ~Kuroi Sunglasses Kaketa Hi Kara~," misono worked with rock band Straightener's bass guitarist, Hinata Hidekazu, who wrote and produced the songs. Takanori Ohkita performed the drums for the song. Both Ohkita and Hinata would go on to work together in the band Nothing's Carved in Stone. While Hinata arranged and produced the songs, the lyrics were written by misono herself.

misono would later release all four songs in the project into one melody on her album Sei -say-.

== Music video ==
The music video for "Zasetsu Chiten" carried a boxing-theme and featured misono in three different incarnations: her in the boxing ring, bruised and tired, a more effeminate incarnation of her in a small crawl space, and her standard incarnation in which she wore a black fedora and red-striped shirt as she played an electric guitar.

The video reflected the lyrics about training and the injuries sustained when one trains hard both physically and mentally. Despite training, there are times of failure, reflected by misono sitting in the boxing ring with bruises. The theme of "breaking out" and "changing your life" are shown in the shots with misono confined to a small box. Despite failing, she continues to train and fight, ultimately promising to win one day.

== Track listing ==
CD
No.	Title	Lyrics	Music	Arranger(s)	Length
1.	"Zasetsu Chiten" (挫折地点 / Failing Points)	misono	Hinata Hidekazu • Ohkita Takanori	Hinata Hidekazu	3:48
2.	"black & white ～Kuroi Sunglasses Kaketa Hi Kara～" (黒いサングラスかけた日から / From the Day I Wore Black Sunglasses)	misono	Hinata Hidekazu	Hinata Hidekazu	3:34
3.	"Zesetsu Chiten" (Instrumental)		Hinata Hidekazu • Ohkita Takanori	Hinata Hidekazu	3:48
4.	"black & white ~Kuroi Sunglasses Kaketa Hi Kara~" (Instrumental)		Hinata Hidekazu	Hinata Hidekazu	3:33

DVD
No.	Title	Length
1.	"Zasetsu Chiten" (Music Video)
2.	"misono Comment Video" (misonoコメント映像)
3.	"Zasetsu Chiten" (TV Spot 15sec + 30sec)	0:45

== Charts ==
Oricon Sales Chart (Japan)

Release	Chart	Peak position	First week sales	Sales total	Chart run
2007.09.12	Oricon Daily Charts	39		3,656	2 weeks
