= VS (song) =

Single by misono

from the album Never+Land
- B-side: "Glass no Kutsu"
- Released: March 29, 2006
- Recorded: 2006
- Genre: J-Pop, pop/rock
- Label: Avex Trax; CD (AVCD-30914); CD+DVD (AVCD-30913/B)
- Songwriter: misono
- Producer: Max Matsuura

Misono singles chronology
"VS" (2006)	"Kojin Jugyo" (2006)

"VS" is the debut single by Koda Misono, under the stage name "misono." misono is the former lead vocalist of the Japanese group day after tomorrow and the younger sister of singer-songwriter Koda Kumi. It was the first single released for her studio album Never+Land, and carried a fairy tale theme, as would the following singles.

The single debuted on the Oricon charts at No. 4 and remained on the charts for ten weeks. It sold over 40,000 units during its run, making it misono's best-selling and best-ranking single throughout her career.

== Background ==
VS is the debut single of Japanese artist Misono Koda, under the stage name "misono." misono is the former lead vocalist of the band day after tomorrow and the younger sister of Koda Kumi. VS debuted high on the Oricon Singles Charts at No. 4 and remained on the charts for ten consecutive weeks. During its charting, the single sold 40,489 units, making it her highest selling solo single to date.

The single was her first release in a slew of fairy tale themed singles created for her debut studio album, Never+Land. For "VS", the overall theme was of Snow White, most notably from The Walt Disney Company's 1937 film adaptation. The music video for the song featured two incarnations of misono, one as the princess Snow White and the other as the Evil Queen. Throughout the video, the Evil Queen would set traps, which Snow White would find and turn against her. The single's coupling track, "Glass no Kutsu" (ガラスのくつ / Shoe of Glass) also kept in tune with the fairy tale theme, being titled after the glass slipper from the story of Cinderella. Despite the title alluding to a fairy tale, the song itself was about the distance between two lovers, with the "shoes" being a euphemism for the distance.

The lyrics to "VS" were written by misono herself, while the musical arrangement was done by video game composer Takahiro Izutani. The musical composition was done by Diamond Head guitarist and composer Susumu Nishikawa. Takahiro composed most of the music for the game Tales of the Tempest, to which "VS" was the theme song. Susumu had previously worked with misono during her time in the band day after tomorrow, and would work with her several times throughout her career as a soloist. "Glass no Kutsu"'s lyrics were also written by misono and she also arranged and performed the piece. The song's melody was written by musical composer Kotaro Kubota, who had worked with the band Tokio for their 2005 album 5 Ahead and their 2003 album Glider. Kotaro has also worked with the likes of Ayumi Hamasaki and Ai Otsuka.

misono would not have another solo single surpass the sales or chart ranking of the single. However, in 2009, she would collaborate with her sister Kumi for the song "It's All Love!," which would become her first and only single to reach number-one on the Oricon Singles charts.

== Promotional activities ==
To help promote her single, misono performed both "VS" and "Glass no Kutsu" live at Avex's now-defunct dance club Velfarre.

"VS" was used as the theme song to the Nintendo DS role-playing video game Tales of the Tempest. misono would later perform more tracks for the Tales of series, which would be compiled onto a CD titled Tales with misono-Best in 2009.

"VS" was also used as the ending theme to the Onkagu Senshi Music Fighter television series throughout the month of April 2006.

== Music video ==
The music video for "VS" was based loosely on the fairy tale of Snow White.

In the video, there are two incarnations of misono: one as the princess Snow White and the other as the Evil Queen. Throughout the video, the two are constantly "versing" off against each other in a series of pranks and attacks. Any time the Evil Queen would attempt to capture the princess, the princess would set a trap for the queen. At the end of the video, the Evil Queen is able to get the princess to take a bite of the poisoned apple from the original story and runs off, believing she had won. However, Snow White wakes up and spits out the apple, showing that, once again, she was able to prank the queen.

== Reception ==
RPGFan wrote: " It provided a very dynamic and interesting melody and misono hit it well with the vocals. It can be a bit too upbeat and peppy which is a hit or miss with me, but the execution is very good."

== Track listing ==
CD
No.	Title	Lyrics	Music	Arranger(s)	Length
1.	"VS"	misono	Susumu Nishikawa	Takahiro Izutani	4:17
2.	"Glass no Kutsu" (ガラスのくつ / Shoe of Glass)	misono	misono	Kotaro Kubota	5:45
3.	"VS" (Instrumental)		Susumu Nishikawa	Takahiro Izutani	4:17
4.	"Glass no Kutsu" (Instrumental)		misono	Kotaro Kubota	5:43

DVD
No.	Title	Length
1.	"VS" (Video Clip)	4:26

== Charts ==
=== Oricon sales chart (Japan) ===
Release	Chart	Peak position	Sales total
March 29, 2006	Oricon Daily Singles Chart	4	
March 29, 2006	Oricon Weekly Singles Chart	4	40,489 copies
March 29, 2006	Oricon Monthly Singles Chart	17	
