= Tales of the Tempest =

2006 video game

- Developers: Dimps, Namco Tales Studio
- Publisher: Namco Bandai Games
- Directors: Teruaki Konishi; Takeshi Narita
- Producer: Makoto Yoshizumi
- Designers: Mutsumi Inomata; Daigo Okomura
- Writers: Shino Taira; Riku Okimata; Makio Kurita
- Composer: Motoi Sakuraba
- Series: Tales
- Platform: Nintendo DS
- Release: JP: October 26, 2006
- Genre: Role-playing video game
- Modes: Single player Multiplayer

Tales of the Tempest (Japanese: テイルズ オブ ザ テンペスト, Hepburn: Teiruzu Obu Za Tenpesuto) is an action role-playing game developed by Dimps and Namco Tales Studio, and published by Namco Bandai Games for the Nintendo DS exclusively in Japan. An entry in the Tales series, it was released on October 26, 2006. The game makes use of the Tales series' recurring Linear Motion Battle System, customized so characters and actions can be controlled and determined using the DS touch screen, as well as incorporating multiplayer elements. The opening of the game was made by Production I.G (2D animated parts only) and uses the music VS composed by Koda Misono.

The game follows Caius Qualls, a Leymon (race of werewolf-like shape-shifters who are persecuted for previous disastrous abuse of their advanced technology) who also have a human blood. With his guardian and parents taken prisoner by the church authorities, he sets out on a quest with other outcasts to save them and overthrow the church's oppressive regime. The game's characteristic genre name is Tamashii o yobisamasu RPG (魂を呼び覚ますRPG, RPG that Awakens the Soul).

Tempest was developed by Dimps, along with staff from Namco Tales Studio, including composer Motoi Sakuraba, designers Mutsumi Inomata and Daigo Okomura, and producer Makoto Yoshizumi. As the first title in the series to be developed for the DS, the concept behind it was to create a compact Tales experience for that platform. Yoshizumi moved to delay the game twice before its release so as to refine the experience. Upon release, the game polarized Japanese and western critics, with Famitsu Weekly giving it a notably harsh review. While some have praised the game's story and gameplay, others have faulted these and other aspects such as its technical quality and short length.

== Gameplay ==
Screenshot of a battle in Tales of the Tempest, showing the display, the HUD and the mechanics of the "3-on-3 Linear Motion Battle System".

Tales of the Tempest is an action role-playing video game. The player navigates the playable characters across 3D environments, including the overworld map, towns and dungeons.. The characters and environment are displayed on one screen of the Nintendo DS system, while menu options such as the character's current status are displayed on the other. The world is governed by a day-night cycle, effecting the environment and the behavior of elements within it. For instance, strong enemies appear at night, and towns cannot be accessed, but conversely some items and treasure are only available at night.

The battle system is a scaled-down version of the Tales series' recurring Linear Motion Battle System (LMBS), a real-time system similar to a fighting game where character actions are performed at the press of a button, with specific buttons triggering either normal or special attacks. The version used in Tempest is called the "3-on-3 LMBS". The player controls one character, with the other two available in battle controlled by the game's artificial intelligence. After setting up a formation in advance, players can switch between characters at will during battle. During battles, characters can switch between three plains of movement, as opposed to previous 2D Tales titles which restricted characters to a single plain. This allows for characters to evade or surround enemies. Actions such as healing, character control and item usage are all controlled using the DS touch screen.

A staple gameplay element, Cooking, also appears. Cooking creates meals to restore health and Technical Points (used for special attacks). Once the right ingredients have been chosen and a recipe has been selected, the food can be made. Each ingredient is selected and added using the touchscreen. Using the wrong ingredients will make the cooking process go wrong. A meal cannot be used again until the party has rested at an inn or entered battle. Some meals carry a special buff for characters when entering battles. The game's local multiplayer option is unlocked after a certain point in the single-player campaign after obtaining a special item. After that point, players can access a special multiplayer dungeon, where up to three players must work cooperatively to reach the treasure at the dungeon's center. If one of the players is defeated, the team restart at the nearest "resurrection point". Items and in-game currency are carried over into the single-player campaign, but experience points are not.

== Synopsis ==
=== Setting ===
Tempest is set on the continent of Areulla, where humans live alongside a half-beast race called Leymons. The Leymons once dominated Areulla, but they gained the ability to command a dangerous technology called Precepts, which was hoped would bring about coexistence between the races. Around the same time, hostile soul-eating spirits called Spots appeared, causing conflict. The experiment to bring about a unification of the races through the creation of the "Law of Life" entailed the forging of a gem called the Patient, which cost the lives of many Leymons. The Law of Life appeared in an imperfect form, killing most of the Leymon population and plunging the entire continent into chaos before the gateway was closed. In the aftermath, the formerly-weak humans rose up and took control. In later years, the human authorities would rewrite the history into an interracial conflict known as the Beast War, further soiling the Leymon's image. Tempest begins 100 years after the Beast War ends: humans are in dominance, and the Leymon are derogatorily called "Lycanths", shunned in human settlements or even hunted for rewards.

=== Characters ===
==== Protagonists ====
- Caius Qualls: A boy living together with his foster father in a remote village in Areulla. A Spot attacked his village because he was entrusted with a crystal by a soldier of the Imperial Guard he saved by chance. When he fought with the Spot along with his foster father, the people of the village found out that his foster father was a Lycanth, and they were treated with a cold attitude.
- Rubia Natwick: A childhood friend of Caius who has lived in the same frontier village since they were children. Since her parents were both priests, she had planned on going to the capital city in order to study; however, her parents were killed by Lukius and his group, who had come to take Caius's father. She journeys with Caius to avenge her parents' deaths at the hands of the inquisitor Rommy.
- Tilkis Barone: He originates from a small country far from Areulla. To investigate a mystery occurring in his country, he travels to the capital city of Areulla. There, he meets with Caius and Rubia. He handles a large sword skillfully and is a very wise person.
- Forest Ledoyen: Forest is a Lycanth that immigrated to a small country. He joins the party to save this country from trouble. He knows a lot about the geography of the world, serving as a traveling guide. He may seem intimidating, but is really a nice person overall.
- Arria Ekberg: Arria Ekberg is a priest of the capital city, but does not support the killing of Lycanths, and instead joins the party to stop what the other priests are doing. She fights with a wand and is very proud of her abilities as a mage.

==== Antagonists ====
- Vincent Bridges: A pope who has two sons with a female Leymon (Melissa Bridges). He became unable to be with her due to race differences, so he raised the youngest son (Lukius), while the oldest one (Caius) was raised by his mother and later by Ramrus.
- Lukius Bridges: Son of Vincent Bridges, he's a Leymon hunter who wears a mask while on duty.
- Rommy: A cold-hearted Spot that helps Lukius to hunt Leymons.
- Albert Mueller: Leader of the Black Knights, he feels that his rank is not good enough for him and dreams of one day becoming king of Areulla.
- Areulla VIII: A Spot that is the king of Areulla. Despite reigning for more than 100 years, he still has the body of a child.

== Development ==
The main concept behind Tales of the Tempest was to create a compact version of a standard Tales game. In addition, the team wanted to create a Tales experience that people could play on the go. Later, it was stated that the compression of features for Tempest and the staff's inexperience with the Nintendo DS caused multiple problems, including technical issues. The title, "Tempest", was derived from the concept of chaotic events and feelings. Makoto Yoshizumi, the producer for Tales of the Abyss, came over to produce the game once Abyss was completed. Tempest was the first Tales title to be developed for the Nintendo DS. It was developed by Japanese game studio Dimps. In contrast to previous Tales games, which featured a sizable amount of voice acting, Tempest restricted voice work to the execution of abilities and the completion of cooking.

The characters were designed by Mutsumi Inomata and Daigo Okomura. Tempest was Inomata's fifth time designing for the series. As part of her design, she created the characters with the DS graphics in mind. Okomura, a minor designer for the series, was responsible for designing the characters Albert and Rommy. In contrast to previous titles, which had purely animated openings, the game's opening cutscene used a mixture of CGI sequences created using the in-game graphics and animated segments by Production I.G. The scenario was written by Shino Taira, Riku Okimata and Makio Kurita. Okimata was brought into the writing process halfway through production. The overall theme of coexistence between different nations and peoples was carried over directly from Abyss and Tales of Rebirth. Its characteristic genre name, a recurring feature in the series, was Tamashii o yobisamasu RPG (魂を呼び覚ますRPG, RPG that Awakens the Soul). One of the main ambitions for the story was to make it comparable with one of the home console Tales games despite the platform and development goals. The game's music was composed by Motoi Sakuraba, the main composer for the Tales series. As his first work for the DS, Sakuraba found composing the music a challenge. One of the main problems was the limited sound capacity of the platform. As a result, it used a high degree of pop music. The title's theme song, "VS", was performed by misono, a singer who had previously performed the theme song for Tales of Symphonia while she was still a member of Japanese band Day After Tomorrow.

== Release ==
The game was originally announced as Tales DS in October 2005, with 2006 as its projected year of release. The game's official title was announced in December 2005. The game's release date was originally set for April 13, 2006. It was later announced that the game would be delayed. Its release date was moved to June 8 of the same year. It was then delayed again, with the release date being set as "before the end of 2006". The state reason for the delays was that the team needed extra time to properly develop the gameplay functions, which were specially designed for the DS. Yoshizumi later claimed personal responsibility for the delays.

The game was originally described as a main entry in the Tales series. After the game's release, with the announcement of Tales of Innocence in July 2007, the series was divided between mainline "Mothership" titles and spin-off "Escort" titles. Tempest, described by Yoshizumi in 2007 as a precursor to Innocence, was officially reclassified as an Escort title at this point. It was speculated by Game Informer that the game's lack of critical and fan acclaim that caused the change, but this has not been confirmed. The game has yet to receive a western localization. Later, staff members of Innocence stated that Tempest was seen as a spin-off while still in development. This classification was changed again in 2020, with Tales games with original characters and stories being classified as "Original", compared to the "Crossover" titles which featured character cameos.

== Reception ==
Reception

Review scores
Publication	Score
Famitsu	28/40 (Weekly); 30/40 (DS + Wii)
RPGamer	2.5/5
Cubed3	8/10
Gemaga	Mixed
Siliconera	Negative

In preparation for release, Bandai Namco prepared shipments totaling 301,000 copies. By November 2006, one month after its release, the game has sold 105,288 units. This was described by magazine Nintendo Dream as a fairly poor performance for a Tales game. As of 2008, the game has sold 205,541 units.

The game was reviewed twice by Famitsu: once in Famitsu Weekly and once in the dedicated magazine Famitsu DS + Wii. Famitsu Weekly gave it a score of 28/40, with the four reviewers each giving a score of 7. While it praised the battle system, which was stated to be more action-oriented than previous entries, multiple points came in for criticism, including poor companion AI, lack of content, and the limited multiplayer functionality. They also thought 2D graphics would have been better than the 3D models used due to quality issues. Famitsu DS + Wii gave the game a slightly higher score of 30/40, with the reviewers giving it respective scores of 8, 7, 7 and 8. The reviewers found the story "appealing", and enjoyed the increased focus on action in the battle system. Points of criticism were the map layout and leveling system. Dengeki DS Style praised the game's opening, but was mixed about the battle display and other aspects of gameplay. SoftBank Creative's magazine Gemaga also gave a mixed review, praising the opening song and battle system, but found that the condensing or removal of standard Tales gameplay elements made the game "unsatisfactory" when compared to its predecessors. Japanese magazine GAME SIDE, in a retrospective on the Tales series, cited the love story between Caius and Rubia as "pale", faulted the story's short length, and noted that the division of displays between screens during battle put undue pressure on the player.

Adam Riley, writing for Cubed3.com, was fairly positive, feeling that many of the Japanese reviews had been overly harsh. While he did find the battle system difficult to handle and the overworld too large, the story, graphics and soundtrack received praise. He also found the game good for short bursts of gameplay, enabling him to make the most of its 12-hour campaign. Kurt Kalata, writing for gaming site Siliconera, was generally negative. He called the game's low-budget look "[its] biggest problem", while also faulting the story, characters, lack of typical Tales features, and the design of the battle system. In his preview for IGN, Anoop Gantayat found the game fairly enjoyable despite impressions given by its delayed release, though he found issues with the touch screen controls.

== Legacy ==
Several pieces of merchandise were created to either promote or supplement the game. As part of the promotion for the game, a 32-page booklet titled Tales of the Tempest Official Fan Book (テイルズ オブ ザ テンペスト オフィシャルファンブック), was created, including an interview with Inomata and trivia concerning the game and series. Three different guides to the game were published between October 2006 and February 2007. A two-part novel based on the game was published by Super Dash Bunko: the two volumes were titled Arashi no Shō (嵐の章, lit. Chapter of Storm) and Kagayaki no Shō (輝きの章, lit. Chapter of Sparkle). They were released in January and March 2007. The novels were written by Ryunosuke Kingetsu and illustrated by Inomata. They included extra stories and character development not included in the original game. The game's soundtrack album, Tales of the Tempest Original Soundtrack (テイルズ オブ ザ テンペスト オリジナル・サウンドトラック), was released on February 27, 2007. The album included an audio drama written by Okimata, portraying events between Caius and Rubia during the ending.

After the release of the Vita port of Innocence, Innocence R, artwork found in that game caused speculation that Tempest might be remade. The "Triverse" connection between the three developed DS titles was established by Bandai Namdo producer Takashi Yota: first featuring in Innocence R, they were included in Tales of Hearts R after positive fan feedback. In 2014, it was revealed that Bandai Namco had been considering a remake of Tempest for some time, and that there was demand for both a remake by Japanese fans and a western release. So far, nothing has been announced.
