= Ai albums discography =

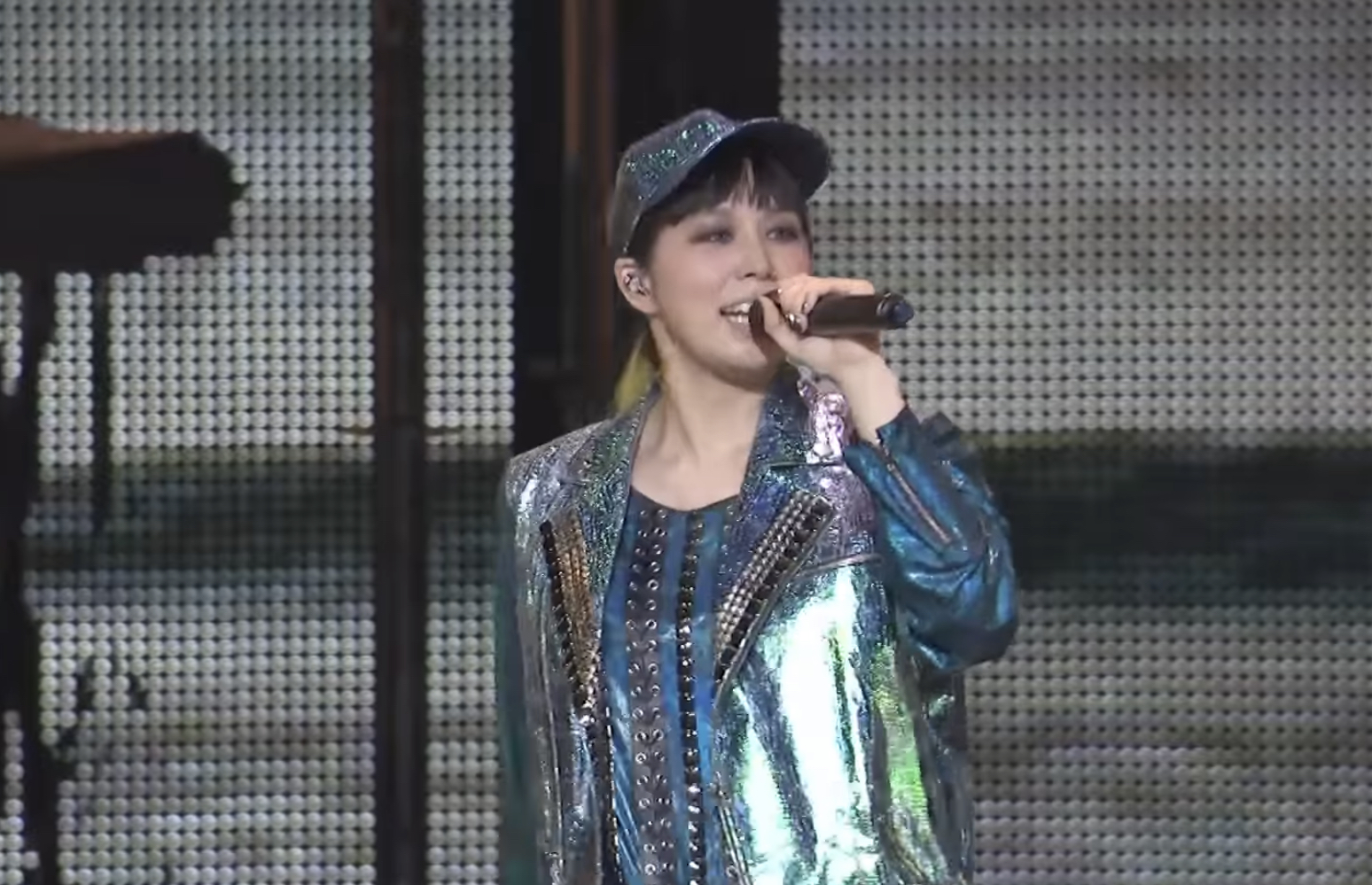
- Ai performing at the Best Tour, 2016
- Studio albums: 14
- Extended plays: 4
- Live albums: 1
- Compilation albums: 13
- Video albums: 10
- Mixtapes: 1

Japanese-American singer-songwriter Ai has released 14 original studio albums, 4 extended plays (EPs), 1 live album, 1 mixtape, and 11 video albums.

Ai signed a recording contract with RCA Records in 2000 and released one album under the label. Her debut studio album, My Name Is Ai (2001), was mildly successful on the Japanese Oricon Albums Chart. In late 2002, she became the first woman to sign with Def Jam Japan, releasing two albums under the label, Original Ai (2003) and 2004 Ai (2004). 2004 Ai became her breakthrough album, peaking at number 3 on the Oricon Albums Chart. Following Def Jam Japan merging into Universal Sigma, Ai signed with Island Records. Her next four studio albums—Mic-a-holic Ai (2005), What's Goin' On Ai (2006), Don't Stop Ai (2007), and Viva Ai (2009)—all charted within the top-ten on Oricon. Ai's greatest hits album, Best Ai (2009), became her first number-one album, spending a total of 42 weeks on the charts. Ai released her eighth studio album, The Last Ai (2010), which peaked at number 14 on the Oricon charts.

In 2011, Ai signed a global publishing deal with EMI. Signing a multi-album record deal with EMI Music Japan, she released her ninth studio album, Independent (2012), which served as her international debut album. The album debuted at number two in its first week, selling 21,000 physical units. Following EMI's acquirement by the Universal Music Group, Ai returned to Universal Music Japan under the EMI Records label. Her tenth studio album, Moriagaro (2013), shared similar success, peaking at number five. From 2014 to 2016, Ai took a short hiatus following her marriage and pregnancy. Her second greatest hits album, The Best (2015), became her longest-charting album within the top 300 of the Oricon charts, peaking at number 3. The album also peaked at number two on the Billboard Japan Hot Albums chart. Near the end of 2016, Ai signed with Def Jam Recordings alongside her current record deal with EMI Records following the release of The Feat. Best (2016).

Ai released her eleventh studio album, Wa to Yo (2017), which fared commercial success within the top 20 of both the Oricon and Billboard Japan charts. Her fourth greatest hits album, Kansha!!!!! – Thank You for 20 Years New and Best (2019), featured re-recorded material alongside previously released material. Ai released two extended plays, It's All Me, Vol. 1 (2020) and It's All Me, Vol. 2 (2021), which were released in part of her twentieth anniversary since her debut. Her twelfth studio album, Dream (2022), spent eighteen weeks on the Oricon charts, selling more units than her previous EP releases. Her thirteenth studio album, Respect All (2023), peaked at seventeen on both the Oricon Albums Chart and Billboard Japan Hot Albums chart. Ai's fifth greatest hits album, 25th the Best – Alive (2025), charted within the top twenty of the Oricon charts. Though not entering the Billboard Japan Hot Albums chart, the album became her first top-ten album on the Download Albums chart, peaking at number seven.

== Studio albums ==
List of studio albums, with selected chart positions and certifications
Title	Album details	Peak chart positions			Certifications
Title	Album details	JPN	JPN Comb.	JPN Hot (Note: Sources for chart positions on the Billboard Japan Hot Albums chart: Wa to Yo; Dream; Respect All)	Certifications
My Name Is Ai	Released: November 2, 2001 (JPN); Label: RCA; Formats: CD	86	*	*	
Original Ai	Released: July 23, 2003; Label: Def Jam Japan; Formats: CD, digital download, streaming	15	*	*	
2004 Ai	Released: June 16, 2004; Label: Def Jam, Universal Sigma; Formats: CD, digital download, streaming	3	*	*	RIAJ: Gold
Mic-a-holic Ai	Released: July 6, 2005; Label: Island, Universal Sigma; Formats: CD, digital download, streaming	4	*	*	RIAJ: 2× Platinum
What's Goin' On Ai	Released: September 27, 2006; Label: Island, Universal Sigma; Formats: CD, digital download, streaming	2	*	*	RIAJ: Platinum
Don't Stop Ai	Released: December 5, 2007; Label: Island, Universal Sigma; Formats: CD, digital download, streaming	4	*	*	RIAJ: Gold
Viva Ai	Released: March 4, 2009; Label: Island, Universal Sigma; Formats: CD, digital download, streaming	10	*	*	
The Last Ai	Released: December 1, 2010; Label: Island, Universal Sigma; Formats: CD, digital download, streaming	14	*	*	
Independent	Released: February 22, 2012; Label: EMI; Formats: CD, digital download, streaming	2	*	*	RIAJ: Gold
Moriagaro	Released: July 17, 2013; Label: EMI; Formats: CD, digital download, streaming	5	*	*	
Wa to Yo	Released: June 7, 2017; Label: EMI; Formats: CD, digital download, streaming	11	— (Note: Wa to Yo did not enter the Oricon Combined Albums chart, but peaked at number 21 on the Oricon Digital Albums chart.)	19	
Dream	Released: February 23, 2022; Label: EMI; Formats: CD, digital download, streaming	12	12	11	
Respect All	Released: August 23, 2023; Label: EMI; Formats: CD, digital download, streaming	17	30	17	
Who's Ai	Scheduled release: 2027; Label: EMI; Formats: CD, digital download, streaming	To be released	To be released	To be released	
"—" denotes a recording that did not chart in that territory. "*" denotes a recording that was released before the creation of a chart.

=== Reissues ===
List of reissues, with selected chart positions
Title	Album details	Peak chart positions
Title	Album details	JPN
Motto Moriagaro	Released: November 20, 2013; Label: EMI; Formats: CD, digital download, streaming	5

== Compilation albums ==
List of compilation albums, with selected chart positions and certifications
Title	Album details	Peak chart positions				Certifications
Title	Album details	JPN	JPN Comb.	JPN Hot (Note: Sources for chart positions on the Billboard Japan Hot Albums chart: The Best; The Feat. Best; Kansha!!!!! – Thank You for 20 Years New and Best)	KOR	Certifications
Flashback to Ai	Released: September 8, 2004 (JPN); Label: BMG; Formats: CD, digital download	55	*	*	*	
Feat. Ai	Released: December 1, 2004 (JPN); Label: Island, Universal Sgima; Formats: CD, digital download, streaming	33	*	*	*	
Best Ai	Released: September 16, 2009; Label: Island, Universal Sigma; Formats: CD, digital download, streaming	1	*	*	46	RIAJ: Platinum
The Best	Released: November 25, 2015; Label: EMI; Formats: CD, digital download, streaming	3	— (Note: The Best did not enter the Oricon Combined Albums chart, but peaked at number 46 on the Oricon Digital Albums chart.)	2	—	RIAJ: Gold
The Feat. Best	Released: November 2, 2016; Label: EMI; Formats: CD, digital download, streaming	28	— (Note: The Feat. Best did not enter the Oricon Combined Albums chart, but peaked at number 21 on the Oricon Digital Albums chart.)	33	—	
Kansha!!!!! – Thank You for 20 Years New and Best	Released: November 6, 2019; Label: EMI; Formats: CD, digital download, streaming	29	28	28	—	
25th the Best – Alive	Released: February 19, 2025; Label: EMI; Formats: CD, digital download, streaming	13	15	— (Note: 25th the Best – Alive did not enter the Billboard Japan Hot Albums, but peaked at number seven on the Download Albums and number 12 on the Top Albums Sales.)	—	
"—" denotes a recording that did not chart in that territory. "*" denotes a recording that was released before the creation of a chart.

== Extended plays ==
List of extended plays, with selected chart positions
Title	EP details	Peak chart positions		
Title	EP details	JPN	JPN Comb.	JPN Hot (Note: Sources for chart positions on the Billboard Japan Hot Albums chart: It's All Me, Vol. 1; It's All Me, Vol. 2)
It's All Me, Vol. 1	Released: July 8, 2020; Label: EMI; Formats: CD, digital download, streaming	18	27	20
It's All Me, Vol. 2	Released: February 24, 2021; Label: EMI; Formats: CD, digital download, streaming	47	— (Note: It's All Me, Vol. 2 did not enter the Oricon Combined Albums chart, but peaked at number 50 on the Oricon Digital Albums chart.)	52
"—" denotes a recording that did not chart in that territory.

=== Compilation extended plays ===
List of compilation extended plays, with selected chart positions
Title	EP details	Peak chart positions
Title	EP details	JPN Hot
Self Selection "Hip Hop"	Released: March 3, 2021; Label: EMI; Formats: Digital download, streaming	— (Note: Self Selection "Hip Hop" did not enter the Billboard Japan Hot Albums chart, but peaked at number 70 on the Billboard Japan Download Albums chart.)
Self Selection "Piano Ballad"	Released: September 27, 2021; Label: EMI; Formats: Digital download, streaming	—
"—" denotes a recording that did not chart in that territory.

== Live albums ==
List of live albums, with selected chart positions
Title	Album details	Peak chart positions
Title	Album details	JPN
Live Ai	Released: March 3, 2007 (JPN); Label: Island, Universal Sigma; Formats: CD, digital download, streaming	14

== Mixtapes ==
List of mixtapes, with selected chart positions
Title	Album details	Peak chart positions
Title	Album details	JPN
Rhythm and Babe	Released: March 3, 2004; Label: Island; Formats: CD	196

== Video albums ==
List of media, with selected chart positions
Title	Album details	Peak positions		
Title	Album details	JPN Comb.	JPN DVD	JPN Blu-ray
Machigainai	Released: February 23, 2005 (JPN); Label: Island; Formats: DVD	—	66	—
Mic-a-holic Ai Japan Tour '05	Released: January 18, 2006 (JPN); Label: Island; Formats: DVD	—	7	—
Nippon Budōkan Ai (日本武道館)	Released: March 28, 2007 (JPN); Label: Island; Formats: DVD	—	11	—
Don't Stop Ai Japan Tour	Released: November 26, 2008 (JPN); Label: Island; Formats: DVD	—	27	—
Viva Ai Japan Tour	Released: June 30, 2010 (JPN); Label: Island; Formats: DVD	—	34	—
"Densetsu Night" at Nippon Budōkan with Chō: Special Guest Ōzei!!! (『伝説 Night』 at 日本武道館 with 超Special Guest大勢!!!)	Released: December 14, 2011 (JPN); Label: EMI Music Japan; Formats: DVD, Blu-ray	—	55	69
Independent Tour 2012: Live in Budokan	Released: December 5, 2012 (JPN); Label: EMI Music Japan; Formats: DVD	—	41	—
Moriagacchaimashita in Budōkan (モリアガッチャイマシタ in 武道館)	Released: March 26, 2014 (JPN); Label: EMI; Formats: DVD, Blu-ray	—	47	117
The Best Tour	Released: June 7, 2017 (JPN); Label: EMI; Formats: DVD, Blu-ray	—	10	43
Ai Tour Wa to Yo (Ai Tour 和と洋)	Released: June 20, 2018 (JPN); Label: EMI; Formats: DVD, Blu-ray	—	28	47
25th Best Tour: Alive	Released: September 23, 2026 (JPN); Label: EMI; Formats: DVD, Blu-ray	8	9	—
"—" denotes a recording that did not chart in that territory.

== Miscellaneous albums ==
List of compilations with notes
Title	Description	Notes
Side by Side	Released: March 25, 2018; Label: EMI	An Amazon Music exclusive playlist consisting of select songs and commentary
Best of Collabo Vol. 1	Released: March 12, 2025; Label: UME	A playlist consisting of select collaboration songs from Ai's discography
Best of Collabo Vol. 2	Released: March 26, 2025; Label: UME	A playlist consisting of select collaboration songs from Ai's discography
Best of Hip-hop / R&B	Released: April 9, 2025; Label: UME	A playlist consisting of select hip-hop and R&B songs from Ai's discography
Best of Happiness	Released: April 23, 2025; Label: UME	A playlist consisting of songs with the theme of happiness from Ai's discography
Best of Ballad	Released: May 7, 2025; Label: UME	A playlist consisting of select ballad songs from Ai's discography
