= The Feat. Best =

2016 greatest hits album by Ai

Greatest hits album by Ai
- Released: November 2, 2016
- Recorded: 2001 (Hikaru Utada vocals); 2003–2016
- Genre: R&B; hip hop; pop; electronica
- Length: 77:42
- Language: Japanese; English
- Label: EMI
- Producer: Decapo; D. Clax; Uta; DJ 2High; The Smeezingtons; Suamana "Swoop" Brown; King David; Jeff Miyahara; Coptic; Jerry Duplessis; Ai Carina Uemura; Fifty1 Fifty; T. Kura; Kei Kusama; The Company; DJ Watari; Jin; Aquarius; 813; Hisato Takenaka

Ai chronology
The Best (2015)	The Feat. Best (2016)	Wa to Yo (2017)

The Feat. Best is the third greatest hits album by Japanese-American singer-songwriter Ai. It was released on November 2, 2016, by EMI Records. The album features 35 artists, including Japanese singers Namie Amuro, Thelma Aoyama, Miliyah Kato, Hikaru Utada, and Exile Atsushi. American artists such as Chaka Khan, Snoop Dogg, The Jacksons, Jeremih, and Boyz II Men also appear on the album.

Upon its release, the album peaked at number 33 on the Billboard Japan Hot Albums chart and number 28 on the Oricon Albums Chart. In support of the album, Ai embarked on The Best Tour, performing at various venues and locations in Japan.

== Background and release ==
Earlier in 2016, a deluxe version of Ai's 2015 greatest hits album The Best was reissued, which included the sleeper hit single "Minna ga Minna Eiyū". In September 2016, Universal Japan announced Ai would be embarking on an anniversary tour, The Best Tour. Later that month, The Feat. Best was announced to be released alongside a triple a-side single, "Happy Christmas/Heiwa/Miracle". "Heiwa" was pre-released to digital stores as a promotional single to promote the release. Both the maxi single and greatest hits album were revealed to be released on November 2, 2016, which was the date of Ai's 35th birthday.

== Track listing ==
The Feat. Best – disc one
No.	Title	Writer(s)	Album	Length
1.	"Final Distance" (13 Years Distance Mix) (with Hikaru Utada)	Akira Miyake; H. Utada; Teruzane Utada	Previously unreleased	6:06
2.	"Show It Off" (DJ Lead featuring Jim Jones and Ai)	Uemura; Jones; DJ Lead; C. Jenkins; D. Lashine	N/A	3:18
3.	"Moriagaro" (featuring Jeremih)	Uemura; Jeremy Phillip Felton	Moriagaro	3:21
4.	"My Baby" (featuring Lloyd)	Lloyd Polite Jr.; Victoria Mwangi; Asia Bryant; Sean "Pen" McMillion; Ralph "Vintage" Jeanty	Moriagaro	3:36
5.	"Let It Go" (featuring Snoop Dogg)	Uemura; Cordell Broadus; DJ2High; Uta; Tynice Hinton	The Last Ai	3:36
6.	"Golden Mic" (Zeebra featuring Kashi Da Handsome, Ai, Dohzi-T and Hannya)	Hideyuki Yokoi; Uemura; Hannya; Kashi Da Handsome; MasterKey	Tokyo's Finest	5:53
7.	"Wavin' Flag" (with K'naan)	Andrew Bloch; Bruno Mars; Edmond Dunne; Jean Duval; Keinan Abdi Warsame; Phillip Lawrence	The Last Ai	4:33
8.	"One More Try" (featuring Chaka Khan)	A. Coley; C. Mortimer; Suamana "Swoop" Brown	The Last Ai	3:51
9.	"Letter in the Sky" (featuring The Jacksons)	Uemura; Curtis Jenkins; King David "The Future"	Independent	4:44
10.	"Incomplete" (featuring Boyz II Men)	Uemura; Jeff Miyahara	The Last Ai	5:17
11.	"No More" (with Exile Atsushi)	Atsushi Satō; Uemura; Uta	40	3:45
12.	"It's Ok" (AK-69 featuring Ai)	Takeshi Hiroki; Uemura	Road to the Independent King	5:00
13.	"Beautiful" (Remix) (featuring Trey Songz)	Uemura; Tremaine Aldon Neverson	What's Goin' On Ai	3:13
14.	"Gotta Get Mine" (English Version) (featuring Bridget Kelly)	Uemura; Blush; Akene Dunkley; Arden Altino; Jerry Duplessis	Moriagaro	3:28
15.	"After the Storm" (featuring Che'Nelle)	Matthew "Damario" Quinney; Joseph Macklin; Carlos "Los" Jenkins; David "Davix" Foreman; Dashawn "Happie" White; Thomas "Tom Jack" Jackson	Moriagaro	3:38

The Feat. Best – disc two
No.	Title	Writer(s)	Album	Length
1.	"Uh Uh......" (Suite Chic featuring Ai)	Michico; Yakko; Uemura	When Pop Hits the Fan	3:59
2.	"O2" (Miho Fukuhara featuring Ai)	Joveek Murphey; Momo "Moncha" N.; Shikata; Skybeatz	The Soul Extreme EP	3:44
3.	"Stronger" (featuring Miliyah Kato)	Uemura; Kato; T. Kura	The Last Ai	5:02
4.	"Wonder Woman" (Namie Amuro featuring Ai and Anna Tsuchiya)	Tiger; Marek Pompetzki; Paul NZA; Chantal Kreviazuk; Tanya Lacey	Checkmate	3:10
5.	"Run Free" (with Miliyah Kato and Verbal)	Uemura; Kato; Ryu Yeong-gi	Motto Moriagaro	4:43
6.	"Scream" (featuring Jesse from Rize)	Uemura; Jesse	Viva Ai	3:22
7.	"Fake" (featuring Namie Amuro)	Uemura; Akihiko George Tashiro	The Last Ai	3:37
8.	"Butterfly" (featuring Anty the Kunoichi, Anna Tsuchiya and Pushim)	Uemura; Anty the Kunoichi; Tsuchiya; Pushim; Masanori Mine; The Company	Don't Stop Ai	4:24
9.	"Still..." (featuring AK-69)	Uemura; Hiroki	The Last Ai	4:12
10.	"Like a Bird" (featuring Corn Head)	Uemura; Corn Head	Viva Ai	5:27
11.	"365" (featuring Deli)	Uemura; Deli; Aquarius	Mic-a-holic Ai	4:11
12.	"Watch Out!" (featuring Afra and Tucker)	Uemura; Akira Fujioka; Tucker	2004 Ai	3:59
13.	"No Generation Gap" (Char featuring Ai)	Hisato Takenaka	Feat. Ai	4:12
14.	"I'll Be There with You" (Miliyah Kato featuring Ai and Thelma Aoyama)	Kato; Uemura; Aoyama	Muse	6:07
15.	"Be Brave" (with Exile Atsushi)	Uemura; Satō	40	4:21
16.	"For My Sister" (featuring Judith Hill)	Uemura; Hill; Uta	The Last Ai	4:10

The Feat. Best – digital version
No.	Title	Writer(s)	Album	Length
1.	"Moriagaro" (featuring Jeremih)	Uemura; Felton	Moriagaro	3:20
2.	"My Baby" (featuring Lloyd)	Polite Jr.; Mwangi; Bryant; McMillion; Jeanty	Moriagaro	3:36
3.	"Let It Go" (featuring Snoop Dogg)	Uemura; Broadus; DJ2High; Uta; Hinton	The Last Ai	3:35
4.	"Wavin' Flag" (with Kn'ann)	Bloch; Mars; Dunne; Duval; Warsame; Lawrence	The Last Ai	3:49
5.	"One More Try" (featuring Chaka Khan)	Coley; Mortimer; Brown	The Last Ai	3:49
6.	"Letter in the Sky" (featuring The Jacksons)	Uemura; Jenkins; King David "The Future"	Independent	4:43
7.	"Incomplete" (featuring Boyz II Men)	Uemura; Miyahara	Independent	5:14
8.	"Beautiful" (Remix) (featuring Trey Songz)	Uemura; Neverson	What's Goin' On Ai	3:13
9.	"Gotta Get Mine" (English Version) (featuring Bridget Kelly)	Uemura; Blush; Dunkley; Altino; Duplessis	Moriagaro	3:27
10.	"After the Storm" (featuring Che'Nelle)	Quinney; Macklin; Jenkins; Foreman; White; Jackson	Moriagaro	3:40
11.	"Stronger" (featuring Miliyah Kato)	Uemura; Kato; T. Kura	The Last Ai	5:01
12.	"Scream" (featuring Jesse of Rize)	Uemura; Jesse	Viva Ai	3:21
13.	"Fake" (Bachlogic remix) (featuring Namie Amuro)	Uemura; Tashiro	The Last Ai	3:37
14.	"Butterfly" (featuring Anty the Kunoichi, Anna Tsuchiya and Pushim)	Uemura; Anty the Kunoichi; Tsuchiya; Pushimz; Mine; The Company	Don't Stop Ai	4:25
15.	"Still..." (featuring AK-69)	Uemura; Hiroki	The Last Ai	4:10
16.	"Like a Bird" (featuring Corn Head)	Uemura; Corn Head	Viva Ai	5:29
17.	"365" (featuring Deli)	Uemura; Deli; Aquarius	Mic-a-holic Ai	4:10
18.	"Watch Out!" (featuring Afra and Tucker)	Uemura; Fujioka; Tucker	2004 Ai	3:59
19.	"No Generation Gap" (Char featuring Ai)	Takenaka	Feat. Ai	4:14
20.	"For My Sister" (featuring Judith Hill)	Uemura; Hill; Uta	The Last Ai	4:10
Total length:				77:42

== Charts ==
Chart performance for The Feat. Best
Chart (2016)	Peak position
Japanese Albums (Oricon)	28
Japanese Digital Albums (Oricon)	21
Japanese Hot Albums (Billboard Japan)	33

== Release history ==
Release history and formats for The Feat. Best
Region	Date	Format(s)	Label	Ref.
Various	November 2, 2016	Digital download; streaming	EMI; Universal	
Japan	November 2, 2016	CD	EMI; Universal Japan; Def Jam	
