= The Best (Ai album) =

2015 greatest hits album by Ai

- Standard edition cover

Greatest hits album by Ai
- Released: November 25, 2015
- Recorded: 2003–2015
- Languages: Japanese; English
- Label: EMI

Ai chronology
Motto Moriagaro (2013)	The Best (2015)	The Feat. Best (2016)

The Best is the second greatest hits album by Japanese-American singer-songwriter Ai, released on November 25, 2015, by EMI Records. It primarily features songs that were released as singles from her studio albums, including "Story" from Mic-a-holic Ai (2005), "Happiness" from Independent (2012), "Dear Mama" from Moriagaro (2013), and a solo cover version of K'naan's "Wavin' Flag (Coca-Cola Celebration Mix)". A deluxe version of the album was released in May 2016, which included "Minna ga Minna Eiyū" and other previously released songs from 2004 Ai (2004) and What's Goin' On Ai (2006).

The album sold over 121,000 copies since its release, receiving a Gold certification from the Recording Industry Association of Japan (RIAJ). On the Oricon charts, the album debuted at number 3, charting for 118 weeks. On the Billboard Japan charts, the album debuted and peaked at number 2.

== Background and release ==
In early 2015, Ai posted on Twitter revealing she was pregnant with her first child. Later that year in September, Ai shared the birth announcement of her child, a baby girl. She revealed she would be releasing a greatest hits album alongside a concert tour, The Best Tour. In October, the album cover was shared online along with a special website created by Universal Music Japan. Subsequently, a release date was revealed alongside the full track listing.

== Promotion ==
Ai embarked on her tenth concert tour, The Best Tour, in promotion of the album. According to Billboard Japan, 130,000 people in total attended the tour. In 2017, Ai released a DVD and Blu-ray featuring footage from the tour. The video album was released on the same day as her eleventh studio album, Wa to Yo.

A new music video for "Story" was released prior to the album's release featuring sand art by Ai's cousin.

== Commercial performance ==
Commercially, The Best charted strongly upon release in Japan. Selling over 121,000 copies, the album sold more copies than her previous two studio albums, Independent (2012), and Moriagaro (2013) combined. The album debuted and peaked at number 3 on the Oricon Albums Chart and number 2 on the Billboard Japan Hot Albums chart.

== Track listing ==
The Best track listing
No.	Title	Writer(s)	Original album	Length
1.	"Happiness"	Ai Carina Uemura	Independent	4:13
2.	"Voice"	Uemura	Moriagaro	5:12
3.	"Dear Mama"	Uemura	Moriagaro	3:58
4.	"Independent Woman"	Uemura; Elliot Washington	Independent	3:05
5.	"Wavin' Flag" (Coca-Cola Celebration Mix) (Version Ai)	Andrew Bloch; Bruno Mars; Edmond Dunne; Jean Duval; Keinan Abdi Warsame; Phillip Lawrence	The Last Ai	3:49
6.	"You Are My Star"	Uemura	Viva Ai	4:37
7.	"One Love"	Uemura; Uta	Independent	4:14
8.	"Letter in the Sky" (featuring The Jacksons)	Uemura; Curtis Jenkins; King David "the Future"	Independent	4:43
9.	"I'll Remember You"	Uemura	Don't Stop Ai	3:59
10.	"After the Storm" (featuring Che'Nelle)	Matthew "Damario" Quinney; Joseph Macklin; Carlos "Los" Jenkins; David "Davix" Foreman; Dashawn "Happie" White; Thomas "Tom Jack" Jackson	Moriagaro	3:38
11.	"Stronger" (featuring Miliyah Kato)	Uemura; Kato; T. Kura	The Last Ai	5:01
12.	"Fake" (featuring Namie Amuro)	Uemura; George Tashiro	The Last Ai	4:14
13.	"Sogood"	Uemura	Moriagaro	3:18
14.	"Hanabi"	Uemura	Moriagaro	4:00
15.	"My Friend"	Uemura; Kazunori Fujimoto	Original Ai	4:23
16.	"Believe"	Uemura; DJ Yutaka; Jin	What's Goin' On Ai	4:32
17.	"Story"	Uemura	Mic-a-holic Ai	4:48
18.	"Story" (English Version)	Uemura	Big Hero 6	4:48
19.	"Beautiful Things"	Uemura; Ryan Williamson; Sean Fenton	Independent	4:40
20.	"Beautiful Life"	Uemura	Independent	3:12
21.	"Nemurenai Machi"	Uemura	The Last Ai	3:40
22.	"Taisetsu na Mono"	Uemura	Don't Stop Ai	5:16
23.	"So Special" (Version Ai) (with Atsushi)	Uemura; Atsushi Sato	Viva Ai	4:13

The Best (Deluxe Edition) track listing
No.	Title	Writer(s)	Original album	Length
1.	"Happiness"	Uemura	Independent	4:13
2.	"Voice"	Uemura	Moriagaro	5:12
3.	"Dear Mama"	Uemura	Moriagaro	3:58
4.	"Independent Woman"	Uemura; Washington	Independent	3:05
5.	"Wavin' Flag" (Coca-Cola Celebration Mix) (Version Ai)	Bloch; Mars; Dunne; Duval; Warsame; Lawrence	The Last Ai	3:49
6.	"You Are My Star"	Uemura	Viva Ai	4:37
7.	"One Love"	Uemura; Uta	Independent	4:14
8.	"Letter in the Sky" (featuring The Jacksons)	Uemura; Jenkins; King David "the Future"	Independent	4:43
9.	"I'll Remember You"	Uemura	Don't Stop Ai	3:59
10.	"After the Storm" (featuring Che'Nelle)	Quinney; Macklin; Jenkins; Foreman; White; Jackson	Moriagaro	3:38
11.	"Stronger" (featuring Miliyah Kato)	Uemura; Kato; T. Kura	The Last Ai	5:01
12.	"Fake" (featuring Namie Amuro)	Uemura; Tashiro	The Last Ai	4:14
13.	"Sogood"	Uemura	Moriagaro	3:18
14.	"Hanabi"	Uemura	Moriagaro	4:00
15.	"My Friend"	Uemura; Fujimoto	Original Ai	4:23
16.	"Believe"	Uemura; DJ Yutaka; Jin	What's Goin' On Ai	4:32
17.	"Story"	Uemura	Mic-a-holic Ai	4:48
18.	"Story" (English Version)	Uemura	Big Hero 6	4:48
19.	"Minna ga Minna Eiyū"	Makoto Shinohara		3:01
20.	"Beautiful Things"	Uemura; Williamson; Fenton	Independent	4:41
21.	"Beautiful Life"	Uemura	Independent	3:12
22.	"I Wanna Know"	Uemura	Don't Stop Ai	4:15
23.	"Nemurenai Machi"	Uemura	The Last Ai	3:41
24.	"E.O."	Uemura	2004 Ai	4:01
25.	"Life" (The Best Version)	Uemura; Stephanie Stokes Fountain	Original Ai	4:24
26.	"Taisetsu na Mono"	Uemura	Don't Stop Ai	5:16
27.	"So Special" (Version Ai) (with Atsushi)	Uemura; Sato	Viva Ai	4:14

Notes

- The album's deluxe edition package consists of two discs.
- "Minna ga Minna Eiyū" samples the melody of "Turkey in the Straw"

== Charts ==
Chart performance for The Best
Chart (2015–2016)	Peak position
Japanese Albums (Oricon)	3
Japanese Digital Albums (Oricon)	46
Japanese Hot Albums (Billboard Japan)	2

== Certifications ==
Certifications and sales for The Best
Region	Certification	Certified units/sales
Japan (RIAJ)	Gold	100,000^{^}
^{^} Shipments figures based on certification alone.

== Release history ==
Release history and formats for The Best
Region	Date	Format(s)	Version	Label	Ref.
Various	November 25, 2015	Digital download; streaming	Standard	EMI; Universal	
Japan	November 25, 2015	CD	Standard	EMI; Universal Japan	
Japan	May 4, 2016	CD	Deluxe	EMI; Universal Japan; Def Jam	
