= Live Ai =

Live album by Ai
- Released: March 7, 2007
- Recorded: 2006
- Genre: R&B; hip hop
- Length: 57:23
- Language: Japanese; English
- Label: Island; Universal Sigma

Ai chronology
What's Goin' On Ai (2006)	Live Ai (2007)	Don't Stop Ai (2007)

Live Ai (stylized LIVE A.I.) is the first live album by Japanese-American singer-songwriter Ai, released on March 7, 2007, by Island Records and Universal Sigma. The album primarily consists of songs and performances from Ai's final performance at Nippon Budokan, but also other various tour dates within Japan from Ai's What's Goin' On Ai tour. The album was reissued on December 5, 2012 by USM Japan.

== Background and release ==
To promote her fifth studio album, Ai embarked on the What's Goin' On Ai tour in Japan. The tour initially featured 11 dates across the country in November and December 2006. An extra date was added on December 13, where Ai performed at the Nippon Budokan stadium in Tokyo to 12,000 people.

A DVD was released on March 28, 2007 titled Nippon Budokan Ai shortly after the release of the live album.

== Track listing ==
All tracks written by Ai Uemura unless noted.

No.	Title	Writer(s)	Length
1.	"I Wanna Know"		4:16
2.	"Believe"		5:05
3.	"Last Words" (Solo version)		4:22
4.	"E.O."		2:31
5.	"No Way"		3:36
6.	"My Friend"		7:57
7.	"Thank U"		2:44
8.	"Intro"		0:23
9.	"Music"		4:34
10.	"Story"		5:29
11.	"Merry Christmas Mr. Lawrence"	Ryuichi Sakamoto	4:18
12.	"Beautiful" (featuring Trey Songz)	Tremaine Neverson; Ai Uemura
13.	"Life"
Total length:			57:23

Nippon Budokan Ai – DVD disc one
No.	Title	Writer(s)	Length
1.	"I Wanna Know"
2.	"Beautiful" (Remix)	Neverson; Uemura
3.	"Too Much" (Remix)
4.	"We Gonna"
5.	"Famous"
6.	"Love Is..."
7.	"Go Find Your Way"
8.	"Believe"
9.	"Last Words" (Solo version)
10.	"E.O."
11.	"Future"
12.	"No Way"
13.	"My Friend"
14.	"Ooh"
15.	"Thank U"
16.	"Intro"
17.	"Music"

Nippon Budokan Ai – DVD disc two
No.	Title	Writer(s)	Length
1.	"Story"
2.	"Merry Christmas Mr. Lawrence"	Sakamoto
3.	"Beautiful" (featuring Trey Songz)	Neverson; Uemura
4.	"Life"
5.	"Tour Documentary"

== Personnel ==
Credits adapted from Tidal.

- Ai Uemura – lead vocals (all tracks), lyricist (1–10, 12–13)
- Tremaine Neverson – featured artist, lyricist (12)
- DJ Watari – composer (1)
- DJ Yutaka – composer (2, 5)
- Desert Storm – composer (3)
- Lofey – composer (3)
- Skane – composer (3)
- 2 Soul – composer, (4, 10)
- Kazunori Fujimoto – composer (6)
- Carsten Lindberg – composer (7)
- Emanuel Officer – composer (7)
- Joachim A. Svare – composer (7)
- T-Kura – composer (8, 9)
- Ryuichi Sakamoto – composer, lyricist (11)
- Stephanie Stokes Fountain – composer (13)

== Charts ==
Chart performance for Live Ai
Chart (2007)	Peak position
Japanese Albums (Oricon)	14
Japanese DVD (Oricon)	11

== Release history ==
Release history and formats for Live Ai
Region	Date	Format(s)	Label	Ref.
Japan	March 7, 2007	Digital download; streaming; CD	Island; Universal Sigma	
Japan	March 28, 2007	DVD	Island; Universal Sigma	
Various	December 5, 2012	Digital download; streaming; CD	USM Japan	
