= 56th NHK Kōhaku Uta Gassen =

- Also known as: The 56th NHK Red & White Song Festival
- Created by: Tsumoru Kondo
- Presented by: Monta Mino; Motoyo Yamane
- Starring: Yukie Nakama; Koji Yamamoto
- Judges: Kotoōshū Katsunori; Hiroko Yakushimaru; Masami Nagasawa; Yoji Yamada; Mitsuko Mori; Takaya Kamikawa; Kaori Manabe; Hayashiya Shōzō IX; Harumi Kurihara
- Ending theme: "Hotaru no Hikari"; Conductor: Shunichi Tokura

Production
- Production locations: NHK Hall; Tokyo, Japan
- Running time: 265 minutes
- Production company: NHK

Original release
- Network: NHK-General; NHK World Premium (Worldwide); TV Japan
- Release: December 31, 2005

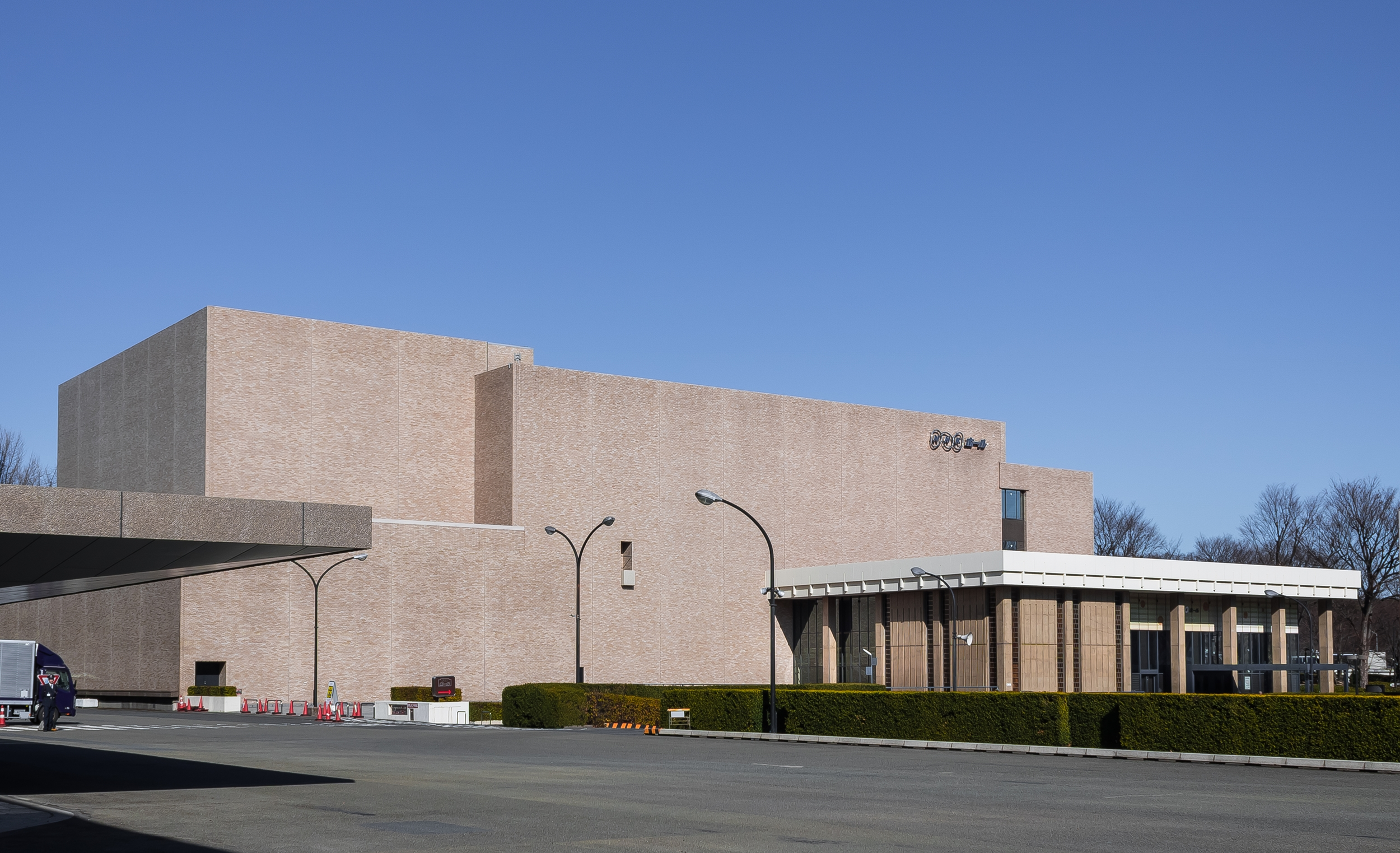
NHK Hall

The 56th NHK Kōhaku Uta Gassen (第56回NHK紅白歌合戦), was the 56th edition of annual NHK's Kōhaku Uta Gassen, held on December 31, 2005, live from NHK Hall (Tokyo, Japan). It was broadcast in Japan through NHK General Television (TV), NHK Radio 1 (Radio), and worldwide through NHK World Premium. This event was filmed and aired from NHK Hall in Japan. Airtime was from 19:20 to 23:45 (with an interruption from 21:25 to 21:30 for news). All times are JST. Viewership ratings in Kantō Region: 42.9%

== Broadcasting ==
- In Japan channels such as NHK General TV, NHKBS2, NHKBShi, and NHK Radio.
- For overseas, NHK World Premium (not broadcast on NHK World TV) and NHK World · Radio Japan (Asia Continent · Southeast Asia region only, time zone broadcasting in other areas).
- NHK World Premium rebroadcast was held at 7:20 - 11:50 on January 5, 2006 (Suspended news of 5 minutes is included).

== Events leading up to broadcast date ==
- On November 21, the songs of "Top 100" was announced.
- On December 1, both red and white contestants were announced.
  - There are 16 pairs of the first participation out of a total of 60 pairs of red and white each 30 pairs.
  - Matsutoya received a consultation of the appearance, it said that it made the commitment of appearance as the same unit in that condition.
- On December 21, the participating singers were announced, the songs are coherently announced nine days after the singers release on December 30.
- On December 30, all participating performer and songs are announced.

== Personnel ==
=== Presenters ===
- Red team host: Yukie Nakama
- White team host: Koji Yamamoto
- Mediators: Monta Mino and Motoyo Yamane

=== Judges ===
- Kotoōshū Katsunori (sumo wrestler)
- Hiroko Yakushimaru (actress), plays in film Always Sanchōme no Yūhi
- Masami Nagasawa (actress), plays in Taiga drama Akira Tsuji
- Yoji Yamada (director), directed Love and Honor
- Mitsuko Mori (actress), plays in Time Slip 60 Years Showa Heisei Always" Corner
- Takaya Kamikawa (actor), plays in film The Good Name is Tsuji
- Kaori Manabe (television host), host of NHK Education: Science Zero
- Hayashiya Shōzō IX (rakugoka, 9th generation
- Harumi Kurihara (celebrity chef)

== Performance order ==
Editions appeared in are in parentheses.

Red Team				White Team	
Order	Artist	Song	Order	Artist	Song
First Part
2	Miyuki Kawanaka (18)	"Nirinsō"	1	Takashi Hosokawa (31)	"Kita Sakaba"
3	Ami Suzuki (3)	"Delightful"	4	Takeshi Kitayama (1)	"Otoko no Shussen"
5	Kaori Mizumori (3)	"Gonōsen"	6	W-inds (4)	"Izayoi no Tsuki"
7	Fuyumi Sakamoto (17)	"Futari no Tairyō Bushi"	8	Akira Fuse (21)	"Shōnen Yo"
10	Aya Matsuura (5); Def.Diva (1); Morning Musume (8)	"Ki ga Tsukeba Suki Sugite; Moriagatte Love Machine"	9	Kobukuro (1)	"Sakura"
12	BoA (4)	"Dakishimeru"	11	Kishidan (2)	"One Night Carnival"
14	Yōko Nagayama (12); Sanshin: Rimi Natsukawa	"Bashōfu"	13	Gospellers (5)	"Hitori"
16	Ayako Fuji (14)	"Murasaki Ujō"	15	Naotarō Moriyama (2)	"Kazahana"
18	Mai Kuraki (3)	Love, Day After Tomorrow	17	Kenichi Mikawa (22)	"Ai no Sanka"
20	Hitomi Shimatani (4)	"Amairo no Kami no Otome"	19	Kiyoshi Maekawa (15)	"Yogiri yo Konya mo Arigatō"
21	Ayaka Hirahara (2)	"Ashita"	22	Ichirō Toba (18); Yutaka Yamakawa (11)	"Umi no Nioi no Okā-san"
23	Kaori Kozai (13)	"Mugonzaka"	24	Sukima Switch (1)	"Zenryoku Shōnen"
25	Yuna Ito (1)	"Endless Story"	26	Tokio (12)	"Ashita o Mezashite"
28	Ai Otsuka (2)	"Planetarium"	27	Chemistry (5)	"Almost in Love"
Atomic Bomb Poem by Sayuri Yoshinaga
30	Ryoko Moriyama(10); Naotarō Moriyama	"Satō Kibi Batake"	29	Masashi Sada (17)	"Ai Mite no
Second part
All Sing: Most-liked Song "Sekai ni Hitotsu Dake no Hana"
31	Koda Kumi (1)	Koda Kumi Special Version (Note: "Cutie Honey", "Butterfly")	32	D-51 (1)	"No More Cry"
33	Ayumi Hamasaki (7)	"Fairyland"	34	Kiyoshi Hikawa (6)	"Omokage no Miyako"
35	Gorie (1)	"Pecori Night"	36	WaT (1)	"Boku no Kimochi"
Time Slip 60 Years Shōwa Heisei Always
37	Sachiko Kobayashi (27)	"Echigo Zesshō"	38	T.M.Revolution (3)	"White Breath"
39	Yo Hitoto (3)	"Hanamizuki"	40	Group Tamashii (1)	"Kimi ni Juice o Katte Ageru"
41	Aiko (4)	"Star"	42	Masayoshi Yamazaki (4)	One More Time, One More Chance
44	Sayuri Ishikawa (28)	"Amagi-goe"	43	Porno Graffitti (4)	"Yo Bailo"
46	Ai (1)	"Story"	45	Shinichi Mori (38)	Ofukuro-san
48	Rimi Natsukawa (4)	"Nada Sōsō"	47	Alice (2)	Alice Premium 2005 (Note: "Kurutta Kajitsu", "Tōku de Kiteki o Kiki Nagara")
50	Yumi Matsutoya with Friends of Love the Earth (1)	"Smile Again"	49	Def Tech (1)	"My Way"
51	Dreams Come True (10)	Nando demo: Kōhaku Special Version (Note: "Nando demo", "Yamashī Kiss o Shite")	52	Hiroshi Itsuki (35)	"Furimukeba Nihonkai"
53	Misato Watanabe (1)	"My Revolution"	54	M-Flo (1); Akiko Wada (29)	"Hey!"
55	Mika Nakashima (4)	"Yuki no Hana"	56	Saburō Kitajima (42)	"Fūsetsu Nagare Tabi"
57	Yoshimi Tendo (10)	"Kawa no Nagare no Yō ni"	58	SMAP (13)	"Triangle"

== Viewer rating ==
On the night of New Year's Eve, TBS and Fuji TV in high audience ratings prepared a special program of martial arts that can be expected ("K-1 PREMIUM 2005 Dynamite !!", "PRIDE Man Festival 2005"), Nippon Television and TV Asahi also organized their own special programs to compete against "red and white". In addition, TV TOKYO, which is broadcasting the yearly forgetful song, broadcast the medley of Matsudaira Ken's "Matsuken Samba I to III" at around 19:20, which is the start time of "red and white" (which was defeated for Kohaku).

In a further intensification of the audience competition was expected, the moderator Minomon other is "viewing rate of 65%, 50% at least," but was showing a willingness, the result is one part of 35.4% (previous year 30.8%), 2 (The data is based on Kanto area, comprehensive TV only, BS2 · BS Hi-Vision not included, according to Video Research Inc, etc.) It was 42.9% (39.3% in the previous year), 42.9% (previous year 39.3% ). In the final red and white score result announcement, the highest audience rating of the moment was recorded 50.1%. Only in the situation of updating the minimum in a historical record of the past year, however, it was far less than the targeted 65%, and Mino announced the comment "I am mourning my inaction."

Also, the audience rating was 17.0% (20: 00-23: FUJI TV "PRIDE MAN FESTIVAL 2005"), TBS "K-1 PREMIUM 2005 Dynamite !!" (21: 00 To 23:40) was 14.8% (20.1% in the previous year) etc.

The rebroadcast that had been done on comprehensive television in February of the following year in the past two years was not done because the organization was organized at the center of the Turin Olympic Games.

== Final results and ratings ==
Final Results
Votes	Red team	White team
Overall	23,414	28,884
Winning Team: White

Preceded by 55th NHK Kōhaku Uta Gassen	Kōhaku Uta Gassen	Succeeded by 57th NHK Kōhaku Uta Gassen
