= Mic-a-holic Ai =

Studio album by Ai
- Released: July 6, 2005
- Recorded: 2005
- Studio: Prime Sound Studio Form (Meguro, Tokyo); Magnet Studio (Tokyo); Real & Beats Studio (Tokyo); Landmark Studio (Yokohama); GiantSwing Studio (Tokyo); Fountain Sound Studio (Philadelphia)
- Genre: R&B; hip hop
- Length: 53:52
- Language: Japanese; English
- Label: Island; Universal Sigma
- Producer: T. Kura; Aquarius; Icedown; Ai; D.R Period; Steph Pockets; DJ Yutaka; 813; 2 Soul; Penny-K

Ai chronology
| Feat. Ai (2004) | Mic-a-holic Ai (2005) | What's Goin' On Ai (2006) |

Singles from Mic-a-holic Ai
- 1. "365" Released: February 9, 2005; 2. "Story" Released: May 18, 2005

Mic-a-holic Ai (stylized as MIC-A-HOLIC A.I.) is the fourth studio album by Japanese-American singer-songwriter Ai. It was released in Japan on July 6, 2005, and elsewhere in Asia on July 19 and July 26, 2005, through Island Records and Universal Sigma. She recorded a majority of the album in Tokyo in 2005 and worked with various Japanese and American producers.

An R&B and hip hop record, Mic-a-holic Ai features elements of Latin and gospel music. Released two months after her breakthrough single "Story", Mic-a-holic Ai became Ai's most commercially successful album of her career. The album debuted at number four on the Oricon Albums Chart, selling 85,000 physical units in its first week with music critics lauding the album's versatility.

== Background and development ==
Ai had been signed to Def Jam Japan for three years, after releasing the albums Original Ai in 2003, and 2004 Ai. Ai was seeing a steady increase in popularity, with 2004 Ai selling double her previous album's amount. In late 2004, two project albums of Ai's were released, Flashback to Ai featuring rarity material from her BMG Japan era, and Feat. Ai, featuring all of her outside collaborations from 2002 until mid-2004, which also featured a new song, "Hot Spot," which was a collaboration with Uzi.

The first single from the album, "365," released in February 2005, was Ai's first top 20 single. Ai also released the single "Crayon Beats" in April that was the children's anime Crayon Shin-chan theme song, although it is not included in the album. "Story" was released in May, two months before the album.

== Writing and production ==
"365"
The first single from the album was the upbeat R&B track "365," which was produced by Aquarius and featured Aquarius' rapper Deli.

"Story"
The ballad "Story" was a smash hit, selling more than three million ringtones.

The album was recorded in 2005, mostly in Tokyo at Prime Sound Studio Form, Magnet Studio and Real & Beats Studio. "Queen" was recorded at Landmark Studio in Yokohama. Additional instrument recording occurred in Philadelphia and New York City in the United States.

The album featured continued production work from previous Ai collaborators 813, T. Kura and 2 Soul, who had all worked together with Ai on 2004 Ai. T. Kura produced three new songs ("If," "Sha La La" and "Sunshine"), while 813 produced "Summer Breeze," and 813 member DJ Yutaka produced "California" on his own. 2 Soul worked on the ballad "Story," as well as Ai's first Latin track, "Passion." Ai worked together with Aquarius on the first single "365," which also featured Aquarius member Deli as a guest rapper. "Another Day" and "Queen" were produced by Icedown, who worked with Ai for the first time on the album.

Ai self-produced the song "Once in a Lifetime," also writing and composing the song. The song also featured additional production by D/R Period.

"Summer Breeze" is a slowed down version of a song from Ai's album Original Ai (2003), called "Summer Time."

== Promotion and concerts ==
"Story" was promoted the most from the album, appearing in TV commercials for Fuji TV Flower Center, download services M-Up and Recochoku, and Morinaga's Jelly Weider drink range. "Story" was also the June 2005 ending theme song for the TV Tokyo music show Japan Countdown. In 2012, "Story" was used as the ending theme song for the Nintendo 3DS game Rhythm Thief & the Emperor's Treasure.

Two other songs from the album received commercial tie-ups. "365" was the Fuji TV music comedy show Hey! Hey! Hey! Music Champ ending theme song, and in October 2005, the song "Queen" was made the Yu Shirota horror film Pray's theme song.

Ai made appearances on two famous radio shows to promote the album, NHK-FM Saturday Hot Request on May 28, 2005, and her own once off show on All Night Nippon, on July 15, 2005.

Ai toured the album from July to October 2005 with the Japanese seven city tour, Mic-a-holic Ai Japan Tour '05. The tour final at Zepp Tokyo on October 24, 2005, was filmed for Ai's second live DVD, also titled Mic-a-holic Ai Japan Tour '05. Three songs from this album were sent to music video channels to promote the DVD, "California," "If" and "Story."

Ai performed "Story" at the 56th NHK Kōhaku Uta Gassen music competition on December 31, 2005, her first appearance on the program.

== Critical reception ==
Critics received the album well. The reviews at CDJournal were impressed by the variety of genres, and were extremely impressed with her lyrics. They called "Story" a "genreless dramatic pure ballad," praising her big vocals and the "deep love overflowing" in the lyrics, calling it her version of Bill Withers' "Lean on Me." What's In? called the album "[Ai's] real masterpiece," and called the piano introduction to "Story" "memorable."

At the 2006 MTV Video Music Awards Japan, "Story" won the award for Best R&B Video.

== Chart performance ==
The album debuted at number four in Japan underneath Ketsumeishi, Shōgo Hamada and Def Tech, selling 85,000 copies. In its second week, it remained at number four. The album spent seven weeks in the top 10, and 33 in the top 100. When it had stopped charting in November 2006, it had spent a total of 76 weeks on the charts, selling five and a half times its first week sales. It was initially certified platinum by the RIAJ after its release, but was eventually certified double platinum in October 2006. This is Ai's most commercially successful work, as of 2012.

In Taiwan, Mic-a-holic Ai spent two weeks charting on G-Music's top 20 Japanese/Korean sub-chart, peaking at number 18. It did not chart on the main combination chart, however.

== Track listing ==
| No. | Title | Writer(s) | Producer(s) | Length |
|---|---|---|---|---|
| 1. | "If" | Ai Carina Uemura; T. Kura | T. Kura | 4:29 |
| 2. | "365" | Uemura; Deli; Aquarius | Aquarius | 4:09 |
| 3. | "Another Day" | Uemura; Daniel Morgan; Icedown | Icedown | 5:27 |
| 4. | "Once in a Lifetime" | Uemura | Ai; D.R Period^{[a]} | 3:41 |
| 5. | "Queen" | Uemura; Icedown | Icedown | 3:59 |
| 6. | "Just Listen" (interlude) | D.R Period | D.R Period | 1:16 |
| 7. | "Party" | Uemura; Steph Pockets | Pockets; Michael Fountain^{[a]} | 3:49 |
| 8. | "Sha La La" | Uemura; T. Kura | T. Kura | 4:26 |
| 9. | "Airport" (interlude) | DJ Yutaka | DJ Yutaka | 0:48 |
| 10. | "California" | Uemura; DJ Yutaka | DJ Yutaka | 4:02 |
| 11. | "Summer Breeze" | Uemura; DJ Yutaka; Shingo S | 813 | 4:27 |
| 12. | "Passion" | Uemura; 2 Soul | 2 Soul | 3:42 |
| 13. | "Sunshine" | Uemura; T. Kura | T. Kura | 4:05 |
| 14. | "A Poem" (interlude) | Uemura; Penny K | Penny K | 0:43 |
| 15. | "Story" | Uemura | 2 Soul | 4:49 |
| Total length: | | | | 53:52 |

Notes

- ^{^[a]}signifies a co-producer.
- "Just Listen", "Airport" and "A Poem" are stylized in all lower case lettering.
- "Queen" and "Passion" are stylized in all upper case lettering.

== Personnel ==
Personnel details were sourced from Mic-a-holic Ai's liner notes booklet.

Performance credits

- Ai – vocals, background vocals
- Aaron "AB" Belinfanti – drums, percussion (#12, #15)
- Damon Bennet – piano (#7)
- Dave Burnett – bass (#12, #15)
- Donald "Scooch: Burnside – guitar (#7)
- Andrea "The Phoenix" Coln – background vocals (#7)
- Tom Coyne – mastering
- Jamar "G" Davis – guitar (#7)
- Deli – rap (#2)
- D/R Period – all instruments (#4, #6)
- Ebony Fay – backing vocals (#3)
- Michael "Bump" Fountain – cuts (#7)
- Eric "DJ Groove" Harvey – cuts (#7)
- Icedown – instruments (#3, #5)
- Noriko Iso – strings (#5)
- Jino (aka Kenji Hino) – bass (#11)
- Kenneth Kobori – acoustic guitar (#12), keyboards (#12, #15), synthesizers (#12, #15)
- T. Kura – all instruments (#1, No. 8, #13)
- Wilson Montuori – classical guitar, electric guitar (#12, #15)
- Daniel O. Morgan – backing vocals (#3)
- Pochi – keyboard (#11)
- Steph Pockets – background vocals (#7)
- Shingo S. – keyboard (#11)
- Sachi – announcement voice (#9)
- Miyuki Saito – background vocals (#7)
- Yumi Sakakibara – strings (#5)
- James Spears – piano (#15)
- Emily Taguchi – strings (#5)

Visuals and imagery

- Noriko Goto – Stylist
- Akihisa Inoue – design assisting
- Misato Kumamoto – art direction, design
- Hiroshi Nomura – photographer
- Akemi Ono – hair, make-up
- Emu Yanagihara – microphone sculpture

Technical and production

- 2 Soul – arrangement, production (#12, #15)
- Ai – production (#4)
- Aquarius – production (#2)
- Aaron "AB" Belinfanti – editing, instrument recording, programming (#12, #15)
- C-murder – vocal recording (#10–#11)
- D.O.I – mixing (#2–#3, #5, #10)
- DJ Yutaka – arrangement (#11), production (#10, #11), sound effects (#9)
- D/R Period – co-production (#4), programming (#4, #6)
- Michael "Bump" Fountain – co-production, engineering (#7)
- Icedown – programming, production (#3, #5)
- Masahiro Kawaguchi – mixing (#11)
- Rich Keller – mixing (#12, #15)
- T. Kura – arrangement, instrument recording, mixing, production (#1, #8, #13)
- Yasufumi Maruyama – recording (#2)
- Taiji Okada – vocal recording (#1, #3–#4, #8, #13)
- Steph Pockets – production (#7)
- Geoffrey Rice – assistant engineer (#15)
- Mitsuro "Boo" Shibamoto – vocal recording (#12, #15)
- Shingo S. – arrangement, production (#11)
- Tatsuya Sato – mixing (#4)
- Yuya Suzuki – recording (#5)
- Mike Tschupp – assistant engineer (#12)

== Charts ==
=== Weekly charts ===
Weekly chart performance for Mic-a-holic Ai
| Chart (2005) | Peak position |
|---|---|
| Japanese Albums (Oricon) | 4 |

=== Year-end charts ===
Year-end chart performance for Mic-a-holic Ai
| Chart (2005) | Position |
|---|---|
| Japanese Albums (Oricon) | 35 |

== Certifications ==
Certifications and sales for Mic-a-holic Ai
| Region | Certification | Certified units/sales |
|---|---|---|
| Japan (RIAJ) | 2× Platinum | 500,000^{^} |
^{^} Shipments figures based on certification alone.

== Release history ==
Release history and formats for Mic-a-holic Ai
| Region | Date | Format(s) | Label | Ref. |
|---|---|---|---|---|
| Japan | July 6, 2005 | CD; digital download; streaming | Island; Universal Sigma | |
| Taiwan | July 19, 2005 | CD; digital download; streaming | Universal Taiwan | |
| South Korea | July 26, 2005 | CD; digital download; streaming | Universal Korea | |
| Various | December 5, 2012 | CD; digital download; streaming | USM Japan | |
