= Ai (singer) =

Japanese-American singer-songwriter (born 1981)

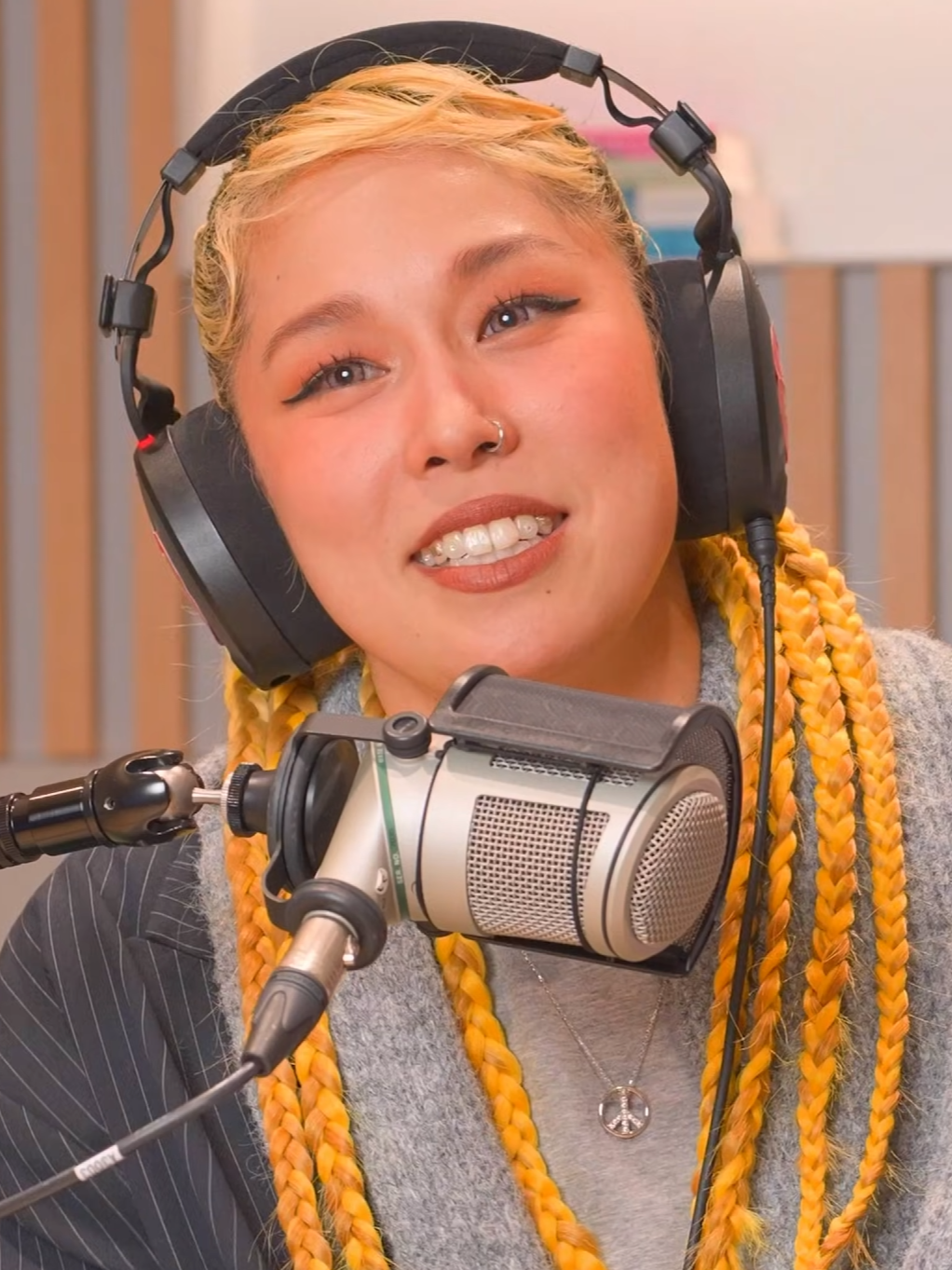
- Ai in 2025
- Born: Ai Carina Uemura; November 2, 1981 (age 45); Los Angeles, California, U.S.
- Education: Los Angeles County High School for the Arts
- Occupations: Singer-songwriter; rapper; record producer
- Years active: 1998–present
- Spouse: Hiro (m. 2014)
- Children: 2
- Awards: Full list
- Musical career
- Origin: Tokyo, Japan
- Genres: J-pop; R&B; hip-hop; dance
- Instrument: Vocals
- Works: Albums; Singles
- Labels: RCA; Def Jam; Universal Sigma; Island; EMI
- Formerly of: SX4

Japanese name
- Kanji: 植村 愛 カリーナ
- Hiragana: うえむら あい かりいな
- Katakana: ウエムラ アイ カリーナ
Transcriptions
- Romanization: Uemura Ai Karīna
- Website: aimusic.tv

Ai Carina Uemura (植村 愛 カリーナ, Uemura Ai Karīna; born November 2, 1981), known mononymously as Ai (Japanese pronunciation: [ai], stylized as AI or A.I. /eɪaɪ/), is a Japanese-American singer, songwriter, and rapper. Known in Japan as the "Queen of Hip-hop Soul", her 2005 single "Story" went on to become her breakthrough release, becoming one of the best-selling multi-format singles in Japan with over 5 million units sold. A multi-million record selling artist, Ai has released thirteen studio albums and has received various accolades, including two Billboard Japan Music Awards and three Space Shower Music Video Awards.

Born in Los Angeles, Ai moved to Kagoshima during her early childhood. Motivated to become a singer, she returned to Los Angeles during her adolescence, attending the Los Angeles County High School for the Arts. While in Los Angeles, she performed as part of a gospel choir at a Mary J. Blige concert and appeared as a backup dancer in Janet Jackson's music video, "Go Deep". She briefly joined the Asian girl group SX4 in 1999 until she graduated from high school. After being discovered by BMG in 2000, Ai relocated to Japan and released her debut album, My Name is Ai (2001), to very little commercial success.

Signing to Def Jam Japan in 2002, Ai became the first woman signed to the label. She released two studio albums under the label, Original Ai (2003) and 2004 Ai (2004). With the release of her third studio album, Ai rose to mainstream prominence in Japan. Transferring to Island Records, Ai released her fourth studio album, Mic-a-Holic Ai (2005). Its second single "Story" became one of the biggest singles of the 2000s in Japan, peaking at number 8 on the Japanese Oricon singles chart, and was the sixth single in history to receive a triple million digital certification by the Recording Industry Association of Japan (RIAJ).

Ai's fifth studio album, What's Goin' On Ai (2006), featured the top-ten singles "Believe" and "I Wanna Know", the former receiving a gold certification from the RIAJ. Her sixth studio album, Don't Stop Ai (2007) saw similar success, which received a gold certification. In 2009, she released her seventh studio album, Viva Ai, which charted in the top ten of the Japanese Oricon albums chart. Ai's greatest hits album, Best Ai (2009), became her first number one album and was certified platinum. In 2010, she released her eighth studio album, The Last Ai, which marked her last release under Island Records.

In 2011, Ai left Universal Music Group and signed a global publishing deal with EMI. Her ninth studio album Independent (2012) served as her international debut and first release under EMI Music Japan. To promote the album, Ai toured in Japan and in Los Angeles. Her tenth studio album Moriagaro (2013) marked her first release under EMI Records Japan following EMI Music Japan's absorption into Universal Music Japan as a sublabel. Her second greatest hits album, The Best (2015) peaked at number 3 on the Oricon Albums chart and number 2 on the Billboard Japan Hot Albums chart, later being certified gold by the RIAJ. Its successor, The Feat. Best (2016) charted within the top 30 of both the Japan Hot Albums and Oricon Albums chart.

Ai's eleventh studio album, Wa to Yo (2017) experimented with traditional Japanese and electronic sounds. Its second single, "Kira Kira" was nominated for the Grand Prix award and won the Excellent Works Award at the 59th Japan Records Awards. Her fourth greatest hits album Kansha!!!!! – Thank You for 20 Years New and Best (2019) was issued to celebrate her twenty years in the music industry. Further celebrating her twenty-year anniversary, Ai released the extended plays It's All Me, Vol. 1 (2020) and It's All Me, Vol. 2 (2021). Ai's twelfth studio album, Dream (2022), included the single "Aldebaran", the theme song of the Japanese drama, Come Come Everybody. The song received critical acclaim and was Ai's first song in five years to appear on the Billboard Japan Hot 100. Her thirteenth studio album, Respect All (2023), included the singles "Life Goes On", the image song for the Japanese film Haru ni Chiru and "Start Again", which served as an insert song for Nestlé Japan's Kit Kats. Commemorating her 25th anniversary, Ai released 25th the Best – Alive (2025), her fifth greatest hits album.

== Life and career ==
=== 1981–1997: Early life and education ===
Ai Carina Uemura was born in Los Angeles, California on November 2, 1981. Her father, Hisashi Uemura, is a former construction business owner and her mother, Barbara Uemura (née Endo) is a former real estate agent. She has one younger sister, Sachi Ueyama (née Uemura), and is of Italian and Native Okinawan descent.

When Ai was four, her family moved to Japan as her father found work at a construction business in Kagoshima. Her family had intentions of returning to Los Angeles within a year however decided to stay in Japan as her father took over business operations of the construction company. During her early childhood, Ai struggled to communicate with her family and peers at school, often blending English and Japanese phrases. Her mother only spoke English at the time while her father, who fluently spoke Japanese, was often away from home due to work.

During her early adolescence, Ai was motivated to become a singer after she sang at her cousin's wedding, having many people ask her if she wanted to be a professional singer, and hearing a gospel performance at the First African Methodist Episcopal Church of Los Angeles in 1993. After graduating from junior high school in Japan, Ai returned to Los Angeles for high school, initially enrolling at Glendale High School, however found high school difficult due to never formally studying English. After a successful audition process, Ai enrolled at the Los Angeles County High School for the Arts, majoring in ballet. She became a member of the school's gospel choir.

=== 1998–2000: Career beginnings, SX4 ===
While attending Los Angeles County High School for the Arts, Ai began her musical career by performing in a gospel choir at a Mary J. Blige concert at the Universal Amphitheatre, performing of "A Dream". In the same year, she appeared as a dancer in the music video for Janet Jackson's song "Go Deep". In 1999, Ai joined an Asian girl group called SX4, who were produced by George Brown of Kool & the Gang. Later in 1999, the group was offered a record label deal.

=== 2000–2004: Relocation to Japan, My Name Is Ai, Original Ai, and 2004 Ai ===
While on a summer holiday in Kagoshima, Ai performed Monica's "For You I Will" on a local radio station, which led to her being scouted by BMG. She decided to take the offer, and after leaving SX4 and graduating from high school in June 2000, moved to Tokyo and debuted as a musician later in 2000.

Ai debuted under BMG Japan sublabel RCA Records with the single "Cry, Just Cry" in November 2000. Two additional singles were released, "U Can Do" and "Shining Star". While the first two failed to chart, "Shining Star" charted and peaked at number 98 on the Oricon singles chart. Eventually, her debut studio album, My Name Is Ai was released in November 2001. Although not commercially successful, the album peaked at number 86 on the Oricon albums chart.

In 2002 Ai moved to Def Jam Japan and became the first female artist signed to the label. Ai claimed that she felt more at home under Def Jam, as many of her co-workers shared her musical tastes. Her first album under the label in 2003, Original Ai,debuted at 15 on Oricon's album charts, and her second, 2004 Ai, debuted at number three. In 2004, she won the Space Shower Music Video Awards' award for Best R&B Video, with her song "Thank U".

After moving to Def Jam, Ai increasingly began collaborating with musicians, especially Japanese hip-hop and rap artists (though under BMG, Ai had collaborated with Mao Denda, and Soul'd Out rapper Diggy-Mo'). She was featured as a rapper on the Suite Chic single "Uh Uh,,,,,", a collaboration between Namie Amuro, Verbal of M-Flo, and music producer Ryōsuke Imai in 2003. Other musicians Ai collaborated with in this period were Afra, Boy-Ken, Joe Budden, Dabo, Deli, Double, Heartsdales, Ken Hirai, M-Flo, Sphere of Influence and Zeebra. Towards the end of 2004, Ai's former label BMG released a compilation album titled Flashback to Ai. The compilation featured songs originally recorded for her debut studio album. Shortly after its release, Universal Japan released Feat. Ai, a compilation album of songs that feature Ai.

=== 2004–2011: Transfer to Island Records, "Story", rise in fame ===
"Story"
The ballad "Story" is currently the biggest hit of Ai's career.

In late 2004, Def Jam Japan was folded into Universal Sigma, leading to Ai signing a new recording contract with its imprint label Island Records. In May 2005, Ai released the ballad single "Story", which became the biggest hit of her career. A sleeper hit, the song charted for 20 weeks in the top 30 in 2005 and 2006 and went on to sell over three million ringtones, one million cellphone downloads, and 270,000 physical copies. Ai later performed "Story" at the prestigious 56th NHK Kōhaku Uta Gassen New Years music concert. Her fourth studio album, Mic-a-holic Ai, was the best selling album of her career, being certified double platinum by the RIAJ.

Ai's first single of 2006, the ballad "Believe", was also a success: it debuted at number two, and sold more than one million ringtones. The song was used as the theme song of the Kenji Sakaguchi starring medical drama, Team Medical Dragon. Her fifth and sixth studio albums, What's Goin' On Ai (2006) and Don't Stop Ai (2007) were also greatly commercially successful, being certified platinum and gold respectively. In 2007, Ai made her debut performance in the United States at the El Rey Theatre with an audience around 800. In 2008, Ai returned to Los Angeles for her Ai Loves LA concert at the Redondo Beach Performing Arts Center. The performance was a benefit concert for the Go for Broke National Education Center, an organization that commemorates Japanese Americans who served in the United States Army during World War II.

In 2009, Ai released her seventh studio album Viva Ai, which charted in the top ten of the Japanese Oricon albums chart. Her greatest hits album, Best Ai was released the same year. Best Ai later became Ai's first album to top the Oricon Albums chart. Ai debuted as a film director in August 2009 with her short film, Take Action, which was recorded in Los Angeles. Alongside Anna Tsuchiya and Micro, Ai also directed the drama film, Blue Pacific Stories. Later that year, Ai performed "Okuribito" and "Story" at the 3rd Asia Pacific Screen Awards which was held in Gold Coast, Australia.

In 2010, Ai collaborated with many artists such as Namie Amuro, Miliyah Kato, Chaka Khan and Boyz II Men on her 10th anniversary album, The Last Ai. Both Ai and Khan won the International Collaboration Artists of the Year at the 2010 Billboard Japan Music Awards for the song "One More Try" and a cover of Khan's "Through the Fire".

=== 2011–2017: Foray into international market, Independent, Moriagaro, and The Best ===
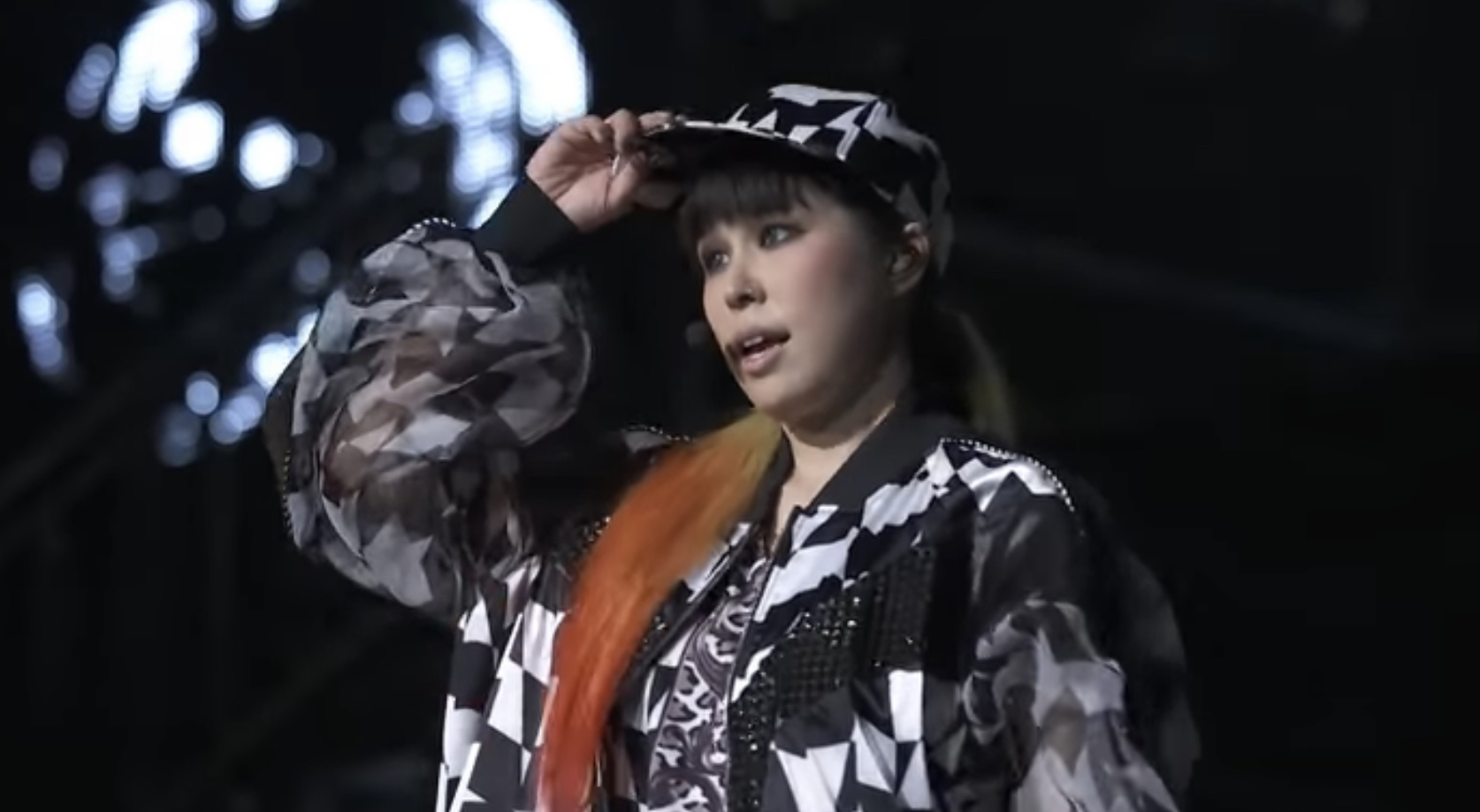
Ai performing at the Best Tour, 2016

In June 2011, Ai's contract with Island Records and Universal Sigma expired. She signed a global publishing deal with EMI and a record deal with EMI Music Japan. She collaborated with the Jacksons on December 13 and 14, 2011, at the Michael Jackson Tribute Live tribute concerts held in Tokyo. She performed the vocals in the third act for Michael Jackson's songs. She also performed and released the theme song for the event, "Letter in the Sky" featuring the Jacksons. In November 2011, Ai released the song "Happiness", a collaboration with Coca-Cola for their winter 2011 campaign. The song was a hit, being certified gold in two different mediums. The song revitalized the sales of her ninth studio album, Independent, which sold more than 60,000 copies. Independent was Ai's first album to be released internationally outside of Asia. In promotion of the album, Ai embarked on the Independent Tour 2012. The tour included a performance at Club Nokia in Los Angeles. In the same year, Ai announced she was working on her US debut album. One song, a remix of Diggy Simmons song "Put You On" featuring Chris Brown and Diggy Simmons himself was released, however the album was never released.

In July 2013, Ai released her tenth studio album, Moriagaro. Its lead single "Voice" peaked at number 2 on the Billboard Japan Hot 100 and was certified platinum. Shortly after, she released a deluxe version of the album, titled Motto Moriagaro. Later that year, Ai performed "Story" in collaboration with figure skater and two-time Olympic champion Yuzuru Hanyu at the touring ice show Fantasy on Ice amongst others. A previously unreleased English version of "Story" was featured in the Japanese dub of the Disney film Big Hero 6 in October 2014.

In January 2015, Ai recorded the song "Off Love" for Spicy Chocolate and Sly and Robbie's Grammy-nominated album, The Reggae Power. In November 2015, Ai released a compilation album, The Best, to celebrate fifteen years in the music industry. The compilation album was reissued in mid-2016. In 2016, Ai signed with Def Jam Recordings in partnership with EMI Records. She later released "Minna ga Minna Eiyū", which became a sleeper hit, peaking at number 4 on the Billboard Japan Hot 100. The original 100-second version of the song was certified platinum while the full version was certified gold. A third compilation release of tracks with featured artists titled The Feat. Best was issued in November 2016. In promotion of these compilation releases, Ai embarked on The Best Tour.

=== 2017–2023: Wa to Yo, twenty-year anniversary, and Dream ===
Ai teased her eleventh studio album, Wa to Yo on social media in April 2017. Wanting to "convey the goodness of Japan" to the rest of the world and "the goodness of the overseas to Japanese people", Ai collaborated with several producers, artists and songwriters from both Japan and the West. The lead single "Justice Will Prevail at Last" was released in May 2017. Wa to Yo was released in June 2017 and was her second international album release outside of Asia. The album was reissued in October 2017, titled Wa to Yo to. The album peaked at number 11 on the Oricon weekly chart.

In early 2019, Ai traveled to her hometown, Los Angeles, California, to record new material to celebrate twenty years in the music industry and for the 2020 Tokyo Summer Olympics. Her fourth greatest hits album, Kansha!!!!! – Thank You for 20 Years New and Best, was released in November 2019, serving as her first international compilation release. In June 2020, Ai's extended play, It's All Me, Vol. 1 was announced and originally was planned to be released on the start of the 2020 Olympics, but instead was released on July 8, 2020, after the event was postponed to summer 2021 due to the COVID-19 pandemic. The lead single of It's All Me, Vol. 1, "Summer Magic" was her second single to be released internationally. Its Japanese version was included in an advertisement for the Amazon Echo.

In November 2020, "Not So Different" was released digitally as the lead single for Ai's extended play, It's All Me, Vol. 2. In December 2020, Ai partnered with One Young World and released a special music video of the song in support of the project. A remix of "Not So Different" featuring Japanese rapper Awich was released on December 11, 2020, as a promotional single. It's All Me, Vol. 2 later was released in February 2021. In March 2021, EMI released a compilation EP of songs by Ai titled Self Selection "Hip Hop". In June 2021, Ai's previous releases with Def Jam Japan, Universal Sigma and Island Records were made available internationally for digital streaming.

On June 28, 2021, Ai released "The Moment" featuring Japanese rapper Yellow Bucks. On the same day, she performed the song with Yellow Bucks and DJ Ryow on CDTV, a Japanese TV channel by TBS. In August 2021, she released a single featuring Dachi Miura, titled "In the Middle". In September 2021, Ai announced her next single, "Aldebaran". The song serves as the theme song for the NHK television drama, Come Come Everybody. Upon its release in November, it became her first charting single on the Billboard Japan Hot 100 since her 2017 single, "Kira Kira". The song debuted and peaked at number 37 on the chart. On the Oricon charts, "Aldebaran" peaked at number 4 on the Daily Digital Singles Chart and number 6 on the weekly Digital Singles Chart. Ai performed "Aldebaran" at the 72nd NHK Kōhaku Uta Gassen on December 31, 2021, her fourth appearance on the show. In December 2021, Ai announced her twelfth studio album on social media, Dream. The nine-track album was released in February 2022. A tour titled after the album began on May 14, 2022 until December. In April 2022, Ai was featured on the front cover of Music Magazine. In May 2022, "Aldebaran" won the Best Drama Song award at the 111th Television Drama Academy Awards.

=== 2023–present: Respect All, Respect All Tour, twenty-fifth anniversary, and Who's Ai ===
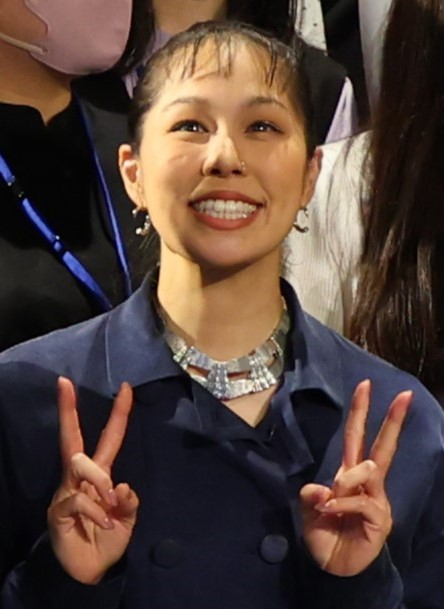
Ai at the 49th G7 summit in 2023

In April 2023, Ai announced the Respect All Tour, her fourteenth headlining concert tour. The tour drew over 80,000 people with the easing of COVID-19 prevention rules in Japan. A single titled after the tour was released on May 22. In May, Ai performed live in Hiroshima on the same day the 49th G7 summit took place. Ai performed and gave a speech to the spouses of world leaders, including First Lady Jill Biden and Akshata Murty. Within that same month, a global tour additionally was announced by her management company where Ai will raise donations for UNICEF Japan. In June, Ai announced her thirteenth studio album, Respect All. Released in August, the album featured Nestlé Japan's Kit Kat campaign song, "Start Again", as well as "Life Goes On", the image song for the Japanese film Haru ni Chiru. Near the end of 2023, Ai released "Whatever", which also was used by Nestlé Japan for a commercial campaign.

In April 2024, Ai and virtual YouTuber Mori Calliope released a duet song "Tide". Near the end of May, she released another duet song "A Procession of the Living" with Ringo Sheena which was included on Sheena's seventh solo studio album, Carnival. In September, Ai announced that she and German producer Zedd recorded the song "Nakama", which served as the ending theme song for Dragon Ball Daima. In November, Ai posted on social media teasing new music for her 25th anniversary in the industry. In a press release, she revealed the branding for her upcoming project. In February 2025, Ai released her fifth greatest hits album, 25th the Best – Alive. Two of her singles, "Happiness" and "Story", were reissued as 7-inch singles simultaneously alongside her greatest hits album. In promotion of the album, Ai embarked on the Alive Tour, from May until December.

In May 2025, Ai announced her first book. The book was originally scheduled for release on July 18, under Gentosha, however was pushed back to November. In October, Ai revealed the title of her book You Are Not Alone, released on November 21, 2025.

In January 2026, Ai announced her first single of 2026, "Lucky I Love You", released on February 27. In March 2026, Ai hinted she was working on her fourteenth studio album. In an interview with Billboard Japan, Ai explained her goal to "experiment with more unconventional processes" on her next album. She later released "It's You", the image song for the drama series Ten Strokes to You. In May 2026, Ai was one of six honorees for the Preuve de Do award at the 2026 Cannes Film Festival. On November 22, 2026, Ai announced her fourteenth studio album Who's Ai, scheduled for release in 2027. A supporting tour of the same name was also announced.

== Artistry ==
=== Influences ===
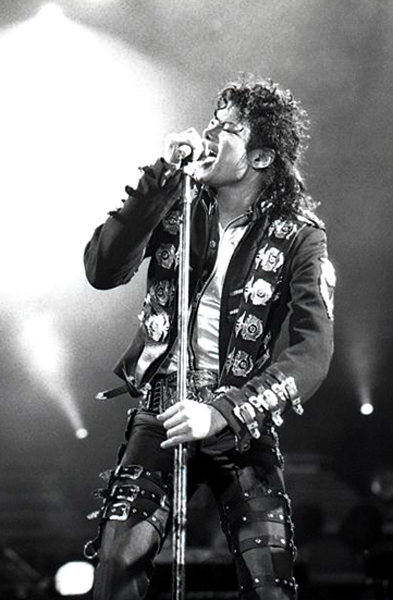
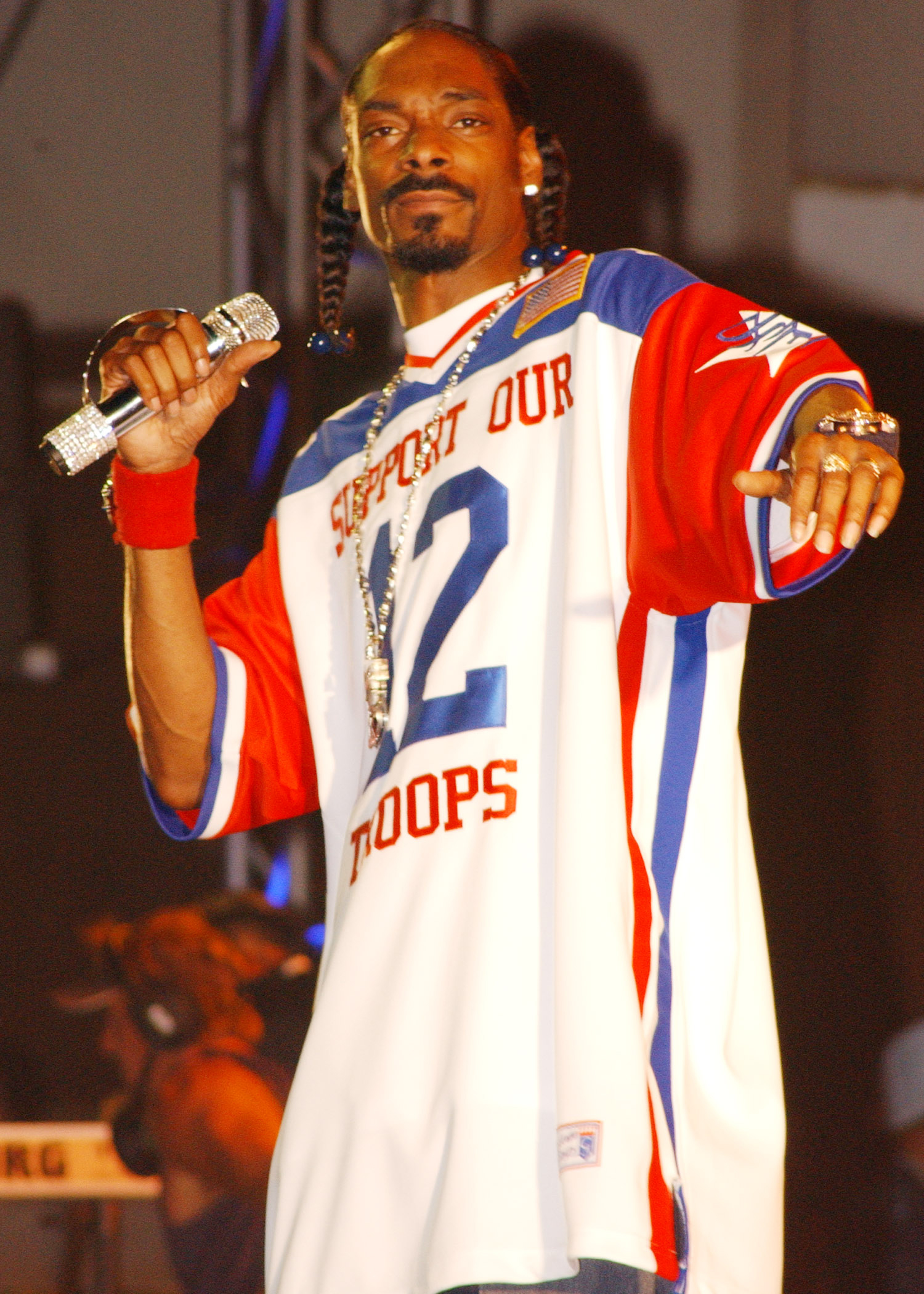
Michael Jackson (left) and Snoop Dogg (right) have influenced Ai.

Ai's earliest musical influence was gospel music, which she discovered when her mother's friend took her to a gospel church during junior high school. In an interview with Vogue, Ai stated Michael Jackson is one of her biggest musical influences. Dr. Dre, Snoop Dogg, Janet Jackson, Puff Daddy, Usher, Mary. J. Blige, Tupac Shakur, and Whitney Houston have also heavily influenced Ai while she was a teenager. In a 2024 interview with Billboard, Ai described Chaka Khan and Boyz II Men as artists she looks up to.

=== Musical styles ===
Ai's discography spans R&B, hip hop, pop, J-pop, and dance genres. Critics have compared her to Beyoncé, Alicia Keys, and Missy Elliott. The Los Angeles Times has described Ai as a "fast-rising diva with authentic American-sounding R&B". While her early works were primarily marketed as R&B, her ninth and tenth studio albums, Independent and Moriagaro experimented with dance-pop. Ai's eleventh studio album Wa to Yo experimented with traditional Japanese and electropop sounds, while also featuring a return to her early R&B sound. Her 2019 greatest hits album Kansha!!!!! – Thank You for 20 Years New and Best heavily featured gospel influences. Ai's twelfth studio album Dream has been described as a pop and R&B album with influence from hip hop and gospel music.

== Other ventures ==
In April 2011, Ai presented a music documentary, Ai Miss Michael Jackson: King of Pop no Kiseki, that was recorded for Music On! TV. In the documentary, she traveled to the United States and interviewed members of the Jackson family in their home.

For the American musical comedy Glee's season two episode "Britney/Brittany", Ai dubbed the voice of Britney Spears in the Japanese release.

=== Products and endorsements ===
As is standard for Japanese musicians, Ai has featured as a spokesman, or has her music featured, for many products. Ai's songs have been used as TV commercial songs, drama theme songs, film theme songs and TV show ending theme songs.

Ai has worked on four major Coca-Cola TV commercial campaigns, two featuring her own songs ("You Are My Star" (2009), "Happiness" (2011)) and two featuring collaborations (K'naan's "Wavin' Flag" (2009), Namie Amuro's "Wonder Woman" (2011)). She has also been featured in two Audio-Technica campaigns (using "My Friend (Live Version)" and "I'll Remember You", a campaign for Japan Airlines ("Brand New Day") and Pepsi Nex with "I Wanna Know".

Ai's most high-profile work for a TV drama was the theme song for 2006's primetime drama Team Medical Dragon, "Believe", which was one of her greatest hits, selling over one million ringtones. Ai also sung the theme song for the drama's second series, "One". Ai also worked on the theme song for the 2010 primetime drama Keishichō Keizoku Sōsahan, "Nemurenai Machi". Other program theme songs include the Japanese theme song for the American drama Heroes ("Taisetsu na Mono"), and the 15th ending theme for the children's animation Crayon Shin-chan, "Crayon Beats"). In 2005, Ai's song "Alive (English Version)" was used as an insert song for the South Korean drama Sassy Girl Chun-hyang.

Many of Ai's songs have been used in films. Her "Story" song was remade (also with its English version) for Disney's box office Big Hero 6 in 2014. She performed the theme song for Departures (2008), the winner of the Academy Award for Best Foreign Language Film in 2009. She has also sung the theme songs for Crayon Shin-chan: The Legend Called Buri Buri 3 Minutes Charge (2005), Pray (2005), Lalapipo (2009) and Berserk Golden Age Arc I: The Egg of the High King (2012). Her music has been featured on the soundtracks of TKO Hiphop (2005), the musical film Memories of Matsuko (2006), in which Ai cameoed to perform the song, and Heat Island (2007). With Japanese producer Yaffle, Ai contributed to the track "Rise Together" for the film Godzilla x Kong: The New Empire (2024).

=== Activism and philanthropy ===
In April 2020, Ai was revealed to be one of the artists performing for Global Citizen's Together At Home concert. Performing various songs from her discography, Ai was the only artist based in Japan to participate in the event. She was later appointed an official artist of One Young World Japan later that year. In January 2021, Ai partnered with DeleteC, a non-profit organization in Japan that funds research into cancer treatment. Becoming vocal about Sustainable Development Goals, she later launched Take Action for Peace in partnership with social media marketing company Fint. In May 2023, Ai became a volunteer of UNICEF Japan, coinciding with the 49th G7 summit that took place in Hiroshima. Having a desire for world peace and equality, Ai commented in an interview that she wants to "...take the message of peace and policy change to not only the G7 leaders gathering in Hiroshima, but to our children across the world who grow up, or may grow up, in the midst of strife and conflict." She later launched the Lasting Peace Project.

In June 2026, Ai was a performing artist at the Global Citizen Festival held in Tokyo. The organization later awarded her the Global Citizen Cultural Champion title.

== Legacy ==
Given Ai's English skills and American background, she stands a better chance than most Japanese artists of breaking overseas."

— Billboard, 2008

In Japan, Ai has earned the nickname "Queen of Hip-hop Soul".

With her management company The Mic-a-holics, Ai helped launch the careers of many Japanese acts, including Japanese singer Riri. In 2012, The Independent listed Ai as the "next big thing in Asian pop".

== Personal life ==
On March 6, 2013, Ai announced her engagement to Hiroshi Noguchi, better known by his stage name Hiro, the leader and vocalist of the rock band Kaikigesshoku. The pair had been dating for 10 years, and wed in January 2014. On August 28, 2015, Ai gave birth to her first child, Heiwa Noguchi. On July 24, 2018, it was revealed Ai was pregnant with her second child. Her second child, Hakwa Noguchi, was born on December 29, 2018.

In 2019, outdoor advertisements for Ai's single, "Summer Magic" were displayed at Shinjuku Station. The advertisement displayed a search result of her name, which showed top results for artificial intelligence (AI), while a cut off photo of Ai herself appeared on the bottom of the search result. On Twitter, Ai revealed her distaste of artificial intelligence being the top results when searching her name mononymously on search engines.

== Controversy ==
In 2012, Ai was part of a controversy regarding the murder of Nicola Furlong. Reports from The Japan Times and Irish Independent stated James Blackston and Richard Hinds were working for Ai as performers for her Independent Tour 2012. On May 21, a day after the tour performance in Sendai, Blackston was at a dance school within the city teaching dance moves for a number of Ai songs to students. Regarding allegations of a connection to the crime, Ai and her representative team declined to make an official statement.

== Discography ==
Ai logo as of 2024

- My Name Is Ai (2001)
- Original Ai (2003)
- 2004 Ai (2004)
- Mic-a-holic Ai (2005)
- What's Goin' On Ai (2006)
- Don't Stop Ai (2007)
- Viva Ai (2009)
- The Last Ai (2010)
- Independent (2012)
- Moriagaro (2013)
- Wa to Yo (2017)
- Dream (2022)
- Respect All (2023)
- Who's Ai (2027)

== Filmography ==
=== Film ===
Year	Title	Notes
2006	Memories of Matsuko	Film
2020	Tokyo Breed: The Rise of One	Documentary
2021	Senri's Seven	Documentary

=== Television ===
Year	Title	Role	Notes	Ref.
2009	Ghost Friends	Yui Mijima	Recurring role; 10 episodes	
2010	Ai Miss Michael Jackson: King of Pop	Self	Television film documentary	
2011	Jônetsu Tairiku	Self	Guest; Episode: "Ai & Yûki"	
2011	Glee	Britney Spears	Dubbing; Episode: "Britney/Brittany"	
2013	Artist	Self	Guest role; Episode: "Ai"	
2013	Mezamashi TV	Self	Guest role; two episodes	
2013	Ferris Wheel at Night		Guest; Episode: "1.10"	
2017	Songs	Self	Guest; Episode: "Futatsu no Rutsu"	
2025	Everyone's Best Kōhaku 100th Anniversary of Broadcasting Special	Self	Cast	

=== Music video appearances ===
Year	Title	Artist(s)	Notes
1998	"Go Deep"	Janet Jackson	Appeared as a backup dancer
2017	"Isshō Nakama"	Thelma Aoyama	
2021	"Colorful"	Various artists	Campaign song for the 2020 Summer Olympics
2024	"Where U R"	Thelma Aoyama	

=== Director ===
Year	Title	Notes
2009	Take Action	Short film
2009	Blue Pacific Stories	Film

== Bibliography ==
- You Are Not Alone

== Tours ==
=== Concert tours ===
- 2004 Ai Live Tour (2004)
- Mic-a-holic Ai Tour '05 (2005)
- What's Goin’ On Ai Tour (2006)
- Don't Stop Ai Tour (2008)
- Viva Ai Tour (2009)
- Independent Tour (2012)
- Moriagaro Tour (2013)
- The Best Tour (2016)
- Wa to Yo Tour (2017)
- It's All Me Tour (2021)
- Dream Tour (2022)
- Respect All Tour (2023–2024)
- Alive Tour (2025)
- Who's Ai!? Tour (2027)

=== One-off concerts ===
- Densetsu Night (November 29, 2010)
- Densetsu Night II (April 30, 2017, May 5–6, 2017)

== Awards and nominations ==
Year	Result	Award	Category	Nominated work
2004	Won	Space Shower Music Video Awards	Best R&B Video	"Thank U"
2004	Nominated	2004 MTV Video Music Awards Japan	Best Buzz Asia – Japan	"After the Rain"
2005	Nominated	2005 MTV Video Music Awards Japan	Best R&B Video	"E.O."
2005	Nominated	2005 MTV Video Music Awards Japan	Best Collaboration	"Watch Out" (with Afra and Tucker)
2005	Won	Space Shower Music Video Awards	Best Female Video	"Watch Out" (with Afra and Tucker)
2006	Won	2006 MTV Video Music Awards Japan	Best R&B Video	"Story"
2007	Won	Space Shower Music Video Awards	Best Female Video	"I Wanna Know"
2007	Won	2007 MTV Video Music Awards Japan	Best R&B Video	"Believe"
2008	Nominated	2008 MTV Video Music Awards Japan	Best R&B Video	"I'll Remember You"
2008	Won	2008 MTV Video Music Awards Japan	Best Buzz Asia – Japan	"I'll Remember You"
2008	Nominated	Space Shower Music Video Awards	Best Female Video	"Brand New Day"
2008	Won	MTV Student Voice Awards	Respect Award	Herself
2009	Nominated	2009 MTV Video Music Awards Japan	Best Video from a Film	"Okuribito"
2009	Nominated	2009 MTV Video Music Awards Japan	Best Collaboration	"Crazy World" (with Anna Tsuchiya)
2009	Nominated	Billboard Japan Music Awards 2009	Artist of the Year 2009	Herself
2009	Won	Billboard Japan Music Awards 2009	Outstanding Pop Artist	Herself
2010	Won	Billboard Japan Music Awards 2010	International Collaboration Artists of the Year	"One More Try", "Through the Fire" (with Chaka Khan)
2011	Nominated	2011 MTV Video Music Aid Japan	Best R&B Video	"Nemurenai Machi"
2011	Nominated	2011 MTV Video Music Aid Japan	Best Collaboration	"Fake" (with Namie Amuro)
2012	Nominated	2012 MTV Video Music Awards Japan	Best R&B Video	"Independent Woman"
2013	Won	27th Japan Gold Disc Awards	Best 5 Songs By Download	"Happiness"
2017	Nominated	59th Japan Records Awards	Grand Prix Award	"Kira Kira" (with Naomi Watanabe)
2017	Won	59th Japan Records Awards	Excellent Works Award	"Kira Kira" (with Naomi Watanabe)
2022	Won	111th Television Drama Academy Awards	Best Drama Song	"Aldebaran"
2022	Won	15th Tokyo Drama Awards	Theme Song Award	"Aldebaran"
2025	Nominated	2025 Music Awards Japan	Best Japanese R&B/Contemporary Songs	"Story"
