= Feat. Ai =

Compilation album by Ai
- Released: December 1, 2004
- Recorded: 2003–2004
- Genre: R&B; J-pop; hip hop
- Language: Japanese; English
- Label: Island; Universal Sigma

Ai chronology
Flashback to Ai (2004)	Feat. Ai (2004)	Mic-a-holic Ai (2005)

Feat. Ai (stylized FEAT. A.I.) is the second compilation album by Japanese–American singer-songwriter Ai, released December 1, 2004, by Island Records and Universal Sigma. The compilation was Ai's first release under Island Records and contains a variety of songs that have her as a featured artist.

Upon the album's release, Feat. Ai peaked at number 33 on the Oricon Albums chart and number 79 on Taiwan's G-Music chart.

== Background and release ==
With the success of 2004 Ai, Ai's former label, BMG released a compilation album in September 2004 of unreleased material and remixes titled Flashback to Ai. Material from the compilation were from Ai's 2001 debut album, My Name Is Ai. Within a few weeks after the release of Flashback to Ai, Universal Japan announced Ai signed to Island Records after her contract with Def Jam Japan expired. A compilation album was announced to be released in December.

== Critical reception ==
CDJournal gave the album a positive review, noting Ai collaborated with more than 20 artists at the time of the release. CDJournal added, "Her [Ai's] voice overcomes genre barriers, capturing the essence of soul music.

== Track listing ==
1. Hot Spot (feat. Uzi) – Ai
2. Angel (feat. Ai) – Boy-Ken
3. No Generation Gap (feat. Ai) – Char
4. Welcome 2 Da Party (feat. Hi-D and Ai) – DJ Watarai
5. Starstruck: "The Return of the LuvBytes" (feat. Ai, Emi Hinouchi and Rum of Heartsdales) – M-Flo
6. Thunder Break (feat. Ai, Hab I Scream and Dabo) – Kaminari-Kazoku
7. Rollin' On (Remix feat. Ai) – Double
8. Super Back Shan (Yes, sir) [feat. Ai] – Dabo
9. Gold Digga (feat. Ai) – Michico
10. Jonan Ondo – Gicode
11. Golden Mic (Remix feat. Kashi Da Handsome, Ai, Zeebra, Dohzi-T, and Han'nya)
12. Fatal Attraction (feat. Ai) – 51-Goichi
13. Uh Uh...... (feat. Ai) – Suite Chic
14. Somebody's Girl – Ken Hirai
15. Love Ya (feat. Ai) – Sphere of Influence
16. Baby Shine – Heartsdales

== Charts ==
Chart (2004)	Peak position	Sales
Japanese Albums (Oricon)	33	JPN: 32,000
Taiwan Albums (G-Music)	79	JPN: 32,000
