= Minna ga Minna Eiyū =

2016 single by Ai

Single by Ai
- Released: February 19, 2016
- Genre: J-pop
- Length: 1:40 (Promotional 100-second version); 3:01 (Full version)
- Label: EMI; Universal
- Songwriter(s): Makoto Shinohara
- Producer(s): Uta

Ai singles chronology
"Be Brave" (2015)	"Minna ga Minna Eiyū" (2016)	"No More" (2016)

"Minna ga Minna Eiyū" (みんながみんな英雄, lit. 'Absolutely, Everyone's a Hero') is a song recorded by Japanese-American singer-songwriter Ai. It was originally released on January 5, 2016, by EMI Records, as a promotional single.

Upon its release, the original 100-second version of the song was a sleeper hit, peaking at number 4 on the Billboard Japan Hot 100, receiving a Platinum certification from the Recording Industry Association of Japan (RIAJ). A full version was later released, which received a Gold certification from the RIAJ. The song was later included in a deluxe reissue of Ai's second greatest hits album, The Best.

== Background and release ==
Written by Makoto Shinohara, "Minna ga Minna Eiyū" was originally planned to only be used in a promotional campaign for au, a Japanese mobile phone operator. A 100-second version of the song was exclusively released on au's music services in January 2016, and a few weeks later was released to other digital stores due to demand. In February 2016, Universal Japan announced the full version of the song was to be released to digital stores.

== Composition and lyrics ==
A J-pop song, "Minna ga Minna Eiyū" samples the melody of "Do Your Ears Hang Low?", a children's song often sung in schools and camps. Lyrically, the song is about being a hero. Real Sound Japan described the song as an "uplifting J-pop song" with "soulful singing" from Ai.

== Live performances ==
Ai performed "Minna ga Minna Eiyū" at the 67th NHK Kōhaku Uta Gassen.

== Track listing ==
All tracks written by Makoto Shinohara and produced by Uta.

- Digital download and streaming (100-second version)
  1. "Minna ga Minna Eiyū" — 1:40
- Digital download and streaming
  1. Minna ga Minna Eiyū" — 3:02

== Charts ==
Chart performance for "Minna ga Minna Eiyū"
Chart (2016)	Peak position
Japan Hot 100 (Billboard Japan)	4

== Credits and personnel ==
Credits adapted from Tidal.

- Ai Carina Uemura – vocals
- Uta – producer, arrangement
- Makota Shinohara – songwriter

== Certifications ==
Certifications and sales for "Minna ga Minna Eiyū"
Region	Certification	Certified units/sales
Japan (RIAJ)	Gold	100,000^{*}
Japan (RIAJ) 100 second version	Platinum	250,000^{*}
^{*} Sales figures based on certification alone.

== Release history ==
Release history and formats for "Minna ga Minna Eiyū"
Region	Date	Format	Version	Label
Japan	January 5, 2016	Digital download; streaming	100 Second	EMI Records
Japan	January 16, 2016	Digital download; streaming	100 Second	EMI Records
Japan	February 19, 2016	Digital download; streaming	Full	EMI Records
Japan	February 26, 2016	Digital download; streaming	Full	EMI Records
Japan	February 26, 2016	Radio airplay	Full	EMI Records
Various	November 6, 2019	Digital download; streaming	Full	EMI Records

== "Minna ga Minna Eiyū 2024" ==
"Minna ga Minna Eiyū 2024"

Promotional single by Ai
- Released: January 1, 2024
- Length: 3:01
- Label: EMI
- Songwriter(s): Makoto Shinohara
- Producer(s): Uta; Ai Carina Uemura

Lyric video
- "Minna ga Minna Eiyū 2024" on YouTube

On January 1, 2024, au aired a new commercial in Japan to celebrate ten years of their Santaro series. A new version of Ai's "Minna ga Minna Eiyū" with new lyrics was used in the commercial. Artificial intelligence art based on works by Bokkuri Matsumoto are entirely used to illustrate the commercial.

Similar to the original song, Shinohara provided lyrics while the melody samples the children's song "Do Your Ears Hang Low?". In an interview, Shinohara discussed that he originally planned to use the original 2016 version of the song, however he went on to modify the lyrics to fit the theme of the commercial. A 100-second version lyric video for "Minna ga Minna Eiyū 2024" was released on Ai's YouTube channel. Alongside original producer Uta, Ai also co-produced the song.

=== Charts ===
Chart performance for "Minna ga Minna Eiyū 2024"
Chart (2024)	Peak position
Japan Top Download Songs (Billboard Japan)	69

=== Personnel ===
Credits adapted from Tidal.

- Ai Carina Uemura – vocals, producer
- Uta – producer, arrangement
- Makota Shinohara – songwriter
