= Harumi Kurihara =

- 栗原 はるみ
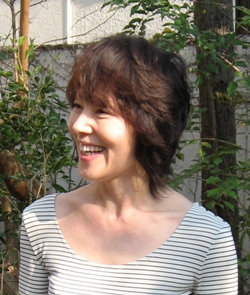
- Harumi in 2007
- Born: March 5, 1947 (age 79); Shimoda, Shizuoka, Japan
- Education: Seijo University Junior College
- Occupations: Author, celebrity cook, television host

Harumi Kurihara (栗原 はるみ, Kurihara Harumi; born March 5, 1947) is a celebrity homemaker and television personality in Japan. Kurihara has often been called the "Martha Stewart of Japan", and has enjoyed popularity there for over twenty years. She is the host of numerous television shows, author of Suteki Recipe, a quarterly recipe magazine which has sold 5 million copies, as well as over 20 bestselling cookbooks and style magazines, has a line of cookware named after her, and owns a chain of stores. Her homemaking empire is named Yutori no Kukan, which means "a space to relax". She has had sponsorship deals with companies such as P&G, Shiseido, 3M, Takara Distillers and Nissan.

She was born in Shimoda, a coastal city, and never had professional training as a chef. She is therefore known for satisfying home cooking. In particular her cuisine is known for combining traditional and newer Western influences, while accounting for the real-world time constraints of a housewife. She is married to Reiji Kurihara, a former television newsanchor, who originally encouraged her to begin her television career, and is now president of Yutori no Kukan.

Harumi's first cookbook was Gochisōsama Ga Kikitakute!, which translates to "I want to hear you say: 'I'm all finished and that was great!'". Harumi's first major cookbook published in English was Harumi's Japanese Cooking, which in 2004 was awarded the best cookbook of the year (and the best world Asian cuisine book) at the 10th Gourmand World Cookbook Awards, and was selected from a pool of 5000 cookbooks from 67 countries.

== Publications ==
- Harumi's Japanese Cooking, (Original limited edition, 2004; Home edition, April 2006) ISBN 1-55788-486-2
- Harumi's Japanese Home Cooking, (2006) ISBN 1-55788-520-6
- Everyday Harumi, (2009) ISBN 978-1-84091-530-3
