= 2006 MTV Video Music Awards Japan =

Annual Japanese music awards ceremony

- Date: May 27, 2006
- Location: Yoyogi National Gymnasium, Tokyo, Japan
- Hosted by: Mokomichi Hayami and Masami Hisamoto
- Website: mtvjapan.com/mvaj

Television/radio coverage
- Network: MTV Japan

The MTV Video Music Awards Japan 2006 were hosted by Mokomichi Hayami and Masami Hisamoto at Tokyo. The 5th annual show premiered live on MTV, Saturday May 27 at Yoyogi National Gymnasium. The awards show was filmed before a live audience of 8000. The event featured live performances from the far east and the west, including Japanese acts AI, Def Tech, Kumi Koda and Remioromen, along with international acts Hoobastank, John Legend, Kelly Rowland, Rihanna and Se7en from South Korea. The event also featured a special performance by Japanese R&B superstar Ken Hirai joining forces with John Legend. The award ceremony was also marked by appearance of the "King of Pop", Michael Jackson.

== Awards ==
Winners are in bold text.

=== Video of the Year ===
Kumi Koda — "Butterfly"

- Gorillaz — "Feel Good Inc."
- Ketsumeishi — "Sakura"
- Madonna — "Hung Up"
- Oasis — "Lyla"

=== Album of the Year ===
Orange Range — Natural

- The Black Eyed Peas — Monkey Business
- Ketsumeishi — Ketsunopolis 4
- Mr. Children — I Love You
- Oasis — Don't Believe The Truth

=== Best Male Video ===
Ken Hirai — "Pop Star"

- 50 Cent featuring Olivia — "Candy Shop"
- Hyde — "Countdown"
- Jack Johnson — "Sitting, Waiting, Wishing"
- Kanye West — "Diamonds From Sierra Leone"

=== Best Female Video ===
Kumi Koda — "Butterfly"

- Namie Amuro — "Wowa"
- Mariah Carey — "We Belong Together"
- Madonna — "Hung Up"
- Nana starring Mika Nakashima — "Glamorous Sky"

=== Best Group Video ===
Def Tech — "Konomama"

- The Black Eyed Peas — "Don't Phunk With My Heart"
- Oasis — "Lyla"
- Orange Range — "Kizuna"
- Tokyo Incidents — "Shuraba"

=== Best New Artist ===
Rihanna — "Pon De Replay"

- Ayaka — "I Believe"
- Def Tech — "Konomama"
- High and Mighty Color — "Over"
- Kaiser Chiefs — "I Predict a Riot"

=== Best Rock Video ===
Green Day — "Boulevard Of Broken Dreams"

- Asian Kung-Fu Generation — "World Apart"
- Coldplay — "Speed of Sound"
- Ellegarden — "Red Hot"
- Sambomaster — "Sekai wa Sore o Ai to Yobundaze"

=== Best Pop Video ===
Remioromen — "Konayuki"

- The Black Eyed Peas — "Don't Phunk With My Heart"
- Ayumi Hamasaki — "Fairyland"
- Kaela Kimura — "Rirura Riruha"
- Gwen Stefani — "Hollaback Girl"

=== Best R&B Video ===
Ai — "Story"

- Mariah Carey — "We Belong Together"
- Craig David — "All the Way"
- Destiny's Child — "Stand Up for Love"
- Crystal Kay — "Kirakuni"

=== Best Hip-Hop Video ===
50 Cent featuring Mobb Deep — "Outta Control"

- Kreva — "Issai Gassai"
- Teriyaki Boyz — "HeartBreaker"
- Kanye West featuring Jamie Foxx — "Gold Digger"
- Zeebra — "Street Dreams"

=== Best Reggae Video ===
Shōnan no Kaze — "Karasu"

- Daddy Yankee — "Gasolina"
- Fire Ball — "Kishitohishito"
- Jumbomaatch featuring Takafin, Boxer Kid and Mighty Jam Rock — "Brand New Style Hi-Fi"
- Sean Paul — "We Be Burnin'"

=== Best Dance Video ===
Gorillaz — "Feel Good Inc."

- Madonna — "Hung Up"
- M-Flo Loves Emyli and Diggy-Mo — "Dopamine"
- New Order — "Krafty"
- Towa Tei featuring Kylie Minogue — "Sometime Samurai"

=== Best Video from a Film ===
Nana starring Mika Nakashima — "Glamorous Sky" (from Nana)

- Amerie — "1 Thing" (from Hitch)
- Toshinobu Kubota — "Kimi No Soba Ni" (from Under The Same Moon)
- Tamio Okuda — "Toritsu Baa" (from Custom Made 10.30)
- Reira starring Yuna Ito — "Endless Story" (from Nana)

=== Best Collaboration ===
Tomoyasu Hotei x Rip Slyme — "Battle Funkatic"

- Bow Wow featuring Omarion — "Let Me Hold You"
- Missy Elliott featuring Ciara and Fat Man Scoop — "Lose Control"
- Glay x Exile — "Scream"
- Crystal Kay x Chemistry — "Two As One"

=== Best buzz ASIA ===
==== Japan ====
Kumi Koda — "Trust You"

- Chemistry — "Almost In Love"
- Yo Hitoto — "Pinwheel"
- L'Arc-en-Ciel — "Jojoushi"
- Mika Nakashima — "Amazing Grace 05"

==== South Korea ====
Se7en — "Start Line"

- Buzz — "Coward"
- Clazziquai Project — "Hold Your Tears"
- Joosuc featuring Lim Jung Hee — "Hip Hop Music"
- Tei — "Love is...one"

==== Taiwan ====
Jay Chou — "Hair Like Snow"

- Kelly Chan — "Short News"
- F.I.R — "Thousand Years Love"
- Nicholas Tse — "Song Of The Brave"
- Cyndi Wong — "Honey"

== Special awards ==
=== Best Director ===
Yasuyuki Yamaguchi

=== Best Special Effects in a Video ===
Soul'd Out — "Iruka"

=== The Most Influential Songwriter Award ===
John Legend

=== Inspiration Award ===
Destiny's Child

=== Legend Award ===
Michael Jackson

== Live performances ==
- AI
- Def Tech
- Hoobastank
- John Legend featuring Ken Hirai
- Kelly Rowland
- Kumi Koda
- Remioromen
- Rihanna
- Se7en

== Guest celebrities ==
- Andrew W.K.
- Anna Tsuchiya
- Daichi Miura
- High and Mighty Color
- Neko Hiroshi
- Mori Izumi
- JK
- Joosuc
- K
- Kaela Kimura
- Megumi
- melody.
- Mika Nakashima
- Miliyah Kato
- Yasuda Misako
- Morisanchu
- Namie Amuro
- Nigo
- Orange Range
- Pamela Anderson
- Soul'd Out
- Sowelu
- SpongeBob SquarePants
- Shōnan no Kaze
- Takanori Gomi
- Tempura Family
- Tohoshinki
- Trey Songz
- Yui
- Yuna Ito
- Zeebra
