= I Wanna Know (Ai song) =

Single by Ai

from the album What's Goin' On Ai
- Released: September 6, 2006
- Genre: J-pop
- Length: 4:16
- Label: Island; Universal Sigma
- Songwriter(s): Ai Uemura
- Producer(s): DJ Watari; Jin

Ai singles chronology
"Believe" (2006)	"I Wanna Know" (2006)	"I'll Remember You" / "Brand New Day" (2007)

Music video
- "I Wanna Know" on YouTube

"I Wanna Know" is a song written and recorded by Japanese-American singer-songwriter Ai. It was released by Island Records and Universal Sigma on September 6, 2006. The single sold 11,074 copies in its first week and peaked at number 9 on the Oricon singles chart.

== Background ==
"I Wanna Know" originally was made for a TV commercial song for PepsiCo in Japan.

== Track listing ==
=== CD ===
1. "I Wanna Know"
2. "I Wanna Know" (Remix)
3. "I Wanna Know" (Instrumental)

=== DVD ===
- "I Wanna Know"
- "Making of I Wanna Know"
- "A.I. CLUB TOUR 2006 Highlights"

== Charts ==
"I Wanna Know" peaked at number nine on the Japan Oricon Singles chart. The song was on the charts for seven weeks.

Chart (2006)	Peak position
Japan Singles Chart (Oricon)	9

== Credits and personnel ==
Credits adapted from Tidal.

- Ai Uemura – vocals, songwriting
- DJ Watari – producer, composer
- Jin – producer, composer
