= What's Goin' On Ai =

Studio album by Ai
- Released: September 27, 2006
- Recorded: 2005–2006
- Studio: Prime Sound Studio Form (Meguro, Tokyo); Real & Beats Studio (Tokyo); Dojo Studios (New York City); Very Cherry Studios (New York); TamStar Studio (Shibuya, Tokyo); Sony Studio (Tokyo); Bunkamura Studio (Tokyo)
- Genre: R&B; hip hop; soul
- Length: 49:02
- Language: Japanese; English
- Label: Island; Universal Sigma
- Producer: T. Kura; Jin; DJ Watarai; DJ Yutaka; The Insomniax; Martin Kierszenbaum; Icedown; Coptic; The Orange Factory; John "Papa Jube" Altino; Arden Altino

Ai chronology
Mic-a-holic Ai (2005)	What's Goin' On Ai (2006)	Live Ai (2007)

Singles from What's Goin' On Ai
- 1. "Believe" Released: April 19, 2006; 2. "I Wanna Know" Released: September 6, 2006

What's Goin' On Ai (stylized as What's goin' on A.I.) is the fifth studio album by Japanese-American singer-songwriter Ai, released on September 27, 2006, by Island Records and Universal Sigma. It was released after the successful ballad single "Believe," and the upbeat R&B song "I Wanna Know."

== Background and development ==
After Ai's 2005 ballad "Story," Ai reached national fame, receiving a three million ringtone certification and performing the song at the 56th NHK Kōhaku Uta Gassen New Years music competition. Her first single after Mic-a-holic Ai was a ballad in a similar vein to "Story," called "Believe." The song was used as the drama Team Medical Dragon's theme song, her first song to be used as a drama theme song. The single debuted at number two, her highest position to date.

A month before the album's release date, Ai released a second single before from the album, the R&B dance song "I Wanna Know." It was used in a TV commercial for Pepsi Nex.

== Writing and production ==
"Believe"
The first single from the album was a soulful ballad.

"I Wanna Know"
The preceding single was an up-beat dance single about world issues.

What's Goin On Ai features a much wider variety of producers than Ai's previous albums. Previous album collaborators include T. Kura ("Music," "Love Is..."), who has worked with Ai since 2004, as well as DJ Yutaka ("Believe," "No Way") and Icedown ("Mirai"), who both worked on Mic-a-holic Ai (2005). Ai worked with DJ Watarai on the single "I Wanna Know," who had previously collaborated with her in 2004, on his song "Welcome 2 da Party," which featured both Ai and rapper Hi-D.

Ai collaborated with four international singers on the album: American singer Trey Songz, Jamaican rapper Shaggy, South Korean R&B singer, actor and idol Rain, and Turkish pop singer Yalın. Several songs were produced by overseas musicians. The Martin Kierszenbaum-produced "Famous" heavily samples Yalın's 2004 song "Değmez." "Ooh" was produced by American production team The Insomniax, and "Go Find Your Way" was produced by New York City brothers John "Papa Jube" Altino and Arden Altino. The original version on "Beautiful" was arranged by American D/R Period, and remixed by New York remixer Coptic. "Too Much" was originally produced by South Korean music mogul JYP, and was remixed by The Orange Factory.

The album's title was inspired by song "I Wanna Know," which Ai wrote about global affairs. "Believe" was inspired by reading the manga for Team Medical Dragon. After reading the manga, Ai felt that every person should be treasured, which inspired the lyrics to the song.

The interludes of the album feature Ai's mother, father, grandmother and her friends.

The majority of songs were recorded at Prime Sound Studio Form in Meguro, Tokyo, with additional Tokyo recording at Real & Beats Studio, TamStar Studio, Sony Studio Tokyo and Bunkamura Studio. Ai recorded three songs in New York City's Dojo Studios and Very Cherry Studios: "We Gonna," "Beautiful" and "Famous."

== Promotion and concerts ==
The pop ballad "Believe" received the greatest promotion on the album, being used as the primetime TV drama Team Medical Dragon's theme song. "Believe" was also used in music.jp commercials.

"I Wanna Know" was used in a high profile Pepsi Nex commercial, as well as commercials for digital music providers Dwango and M-Up. Two other songs were used in TV commercial campaigns, "No Way!" in Lotte's Xylitol gum commercials, and the original version of "Beautiful" featured in beauty care center La Parler's commercials. "Mirai" was used as the ending theme song for TV Tokyo's golfing show featuring female professional golfer Ai Miyazato, Miyazato Ai no Big Golf in USA.

Ai performed "I Wanna Know" at the late night music show Bokura no Ongaku on September 1, 2006, as well as two other non-album songs. On September 27, 2006, Ai performed a secret live to 2,000 people at a free event at Bunkamura in Shibuya, Tokyo.

Ai followed the album with her What's Goin' On Ai Japan Tour, initially featuring 11 dates across the country in November and December 2006. An extra date was added on December 13, where Ai performed at the Nippon Budokan stadium in Tokyo to 12,000 people. The album was released as a live album in 2007, Live Ai, as well as being released to DVD on the same day, titled Nippon Budokan Ai.

== Critical reception ==
Professional ratings
Review scores
Source	Rating
CDJournal	(favorable)
Hot Express	(favorable)
Listen Japan	(favorable)
What's In?	(favorable)

Critics thought highly of the album. What's In? reiviewers called the album a "must item," noting the album's "rhythm, groove and overflowing cool." Yosuke Motoi of Hot Express enjoyed the contrast between the album's issue-pressing title and the songs' lyrics, which instead of being confronting, are introspectively asking what (the songs' protagonists) should be doing. Morio Mori of Listen Japan felt that the album was "scaled up" compared to her previous works, being impressed with the album's breath. Ai's vocals were praised by many reviewers, with CDJournal calling the vocals on "Love Is..." were "surely a thing to give you goosebumps."

Ai won two awards for the videos on the album. "I Wanna Know" won the Best Female Video award at the 2007 Space Shower Music Video Awards, and "Believe" won Best R&B Video at the 2007 MTV Video Music Awards Japan.

== Chart performance ==
The album debuted at number two in Japan, losing to folk band Kobukuro's first greatest hits album All Singles Best. In its first week, it sold 101,000 copies, which is currently Ai's best first week total to date. Like many of her releases, What's Goin On Ai was a long-term seller, charting in the top 10 for four weeks, and spending a total of 17 weeks in the top 300. The album was certified platinum in its month of release.

In Taiwan, the album charted for five weeks in the Japanese/Korean subchart, peaking at number 11. This was her best position in Taiwan to date, however it did not reach the combined chart's top 20.

== Track listing ==
No.	Title	Lyrics	Music	Arranger(s)	Length
1.	"Intro"		T. Kura		0:22
2.	"Music"	Ai	T. Kura, Ai	T. Kura	3:59
3.	"What's Goin' On Pt. 1"				0:54
4.	"I Wanna Know"	Ai	Ai, DJ Watarai, Jin	DJ Watarai, Jin	4:16
5.	"Go Find Your Way"	Ai	Ai		3:53
6.	"We Gonna"	Ai	Ai		3:07
7.	"What's Goin' On Pt. 2"				1:04
8.	"No Way"	Ai	Ai, DJ Yutaka	DJ Yutaka, Shingo. S (keyboard arrangement)	3:35
9.	"Believe"	Ai	Ai, DJ Yutaka, Jin	DJ Yutaka, Kaori Sawada (keyboard arrangement)	5:13
10.	"Ooh"	Ai	Ai	The Insomniax	4:10
11.	"Beautiful (Remix)" (featuring Trey Songz)	Ai, T. Songz	Ai, T. Songz	Coptic (mix)	3:12
12.	"Too Much (Remix)" (featuring Rain)	JYP, Ai	JYP, Ai	The Orange Factory (mix)	3:22
13.	"Famous" (featuring Shaggy and Yalın)	Ai, Martin Kierszenbaum, Yalın	Ai, M. Kierszenbaum, Yalın	M. Kierszenbaum	3:13
14.	"Mirai" (未来 "Future")	Ai	Ai, Icedown	Icedown	4:35
15.	"Love Is..."	Ai	T. Kura, Ai	T. Kura	4:05
Total length:					49:02

== Personnel ==
Personnel details were sourced from What's Goin' On Ai's liner notes booklet.

Managerial

- Yuki Arai – co-executive producer
- Naoshi Fujikura – head publicity and promotion
- Nobuhiko Kakihara – promotion planning
- Justin Kalifowitz – production coordination (#6, #10–#12)
- Aiichiro Kiyohara – A&R director
- Kaz Koike – co-executive producer
- Shinki Miura – co-executive producer
- Hitomi Miyamoto – artwork coordination
- Keiko Ohashi – Altino Music production management (#5)
- Koichi Sakakibara – artist management
- Sakie Sekiya – production coordination (#12)
- Ellie Shibata – production coordination (#12)
- Yuko Yasumoto – production coordination (#6, #10–#12)

Performance credits

- Ai – vocals, background vocals
- Robbie Danzie – introduction monologue (#1)
- Icedown – all instruments (#14)
- The Insomniax – all instruments (#10)
- Shigeki Ippon – viola (#4)
- Hiroki Kashiwagi – cello (#4)
- Kazunori Kumagai – tap (#4)
- Shoko Miki – viola (#4)
- Koichiro Muroya – violin (#4)
- Naoto – violin (#4)
- Yuichi Ohno – additional keyboards (#6)
- Rain – vocals (#12)
- Shaggy – vocals (#13)
- Trey Songz – vocals (#11)
- Yalın – vocals (#13)

Visuals and imagery

- Noriko Goto – stylist
- Akihisa Inoue – design
- Nicci Keller – photographer
- Misato Kumamoto – art direction, design
- Maki Morita – live stage "paparazzi" photographer
- Akemi Ono – hair, make-up

Technical and production

- Filthy Rich Ahee – recording (#6, #11)
- John "Papa Jube" Altino – arrangement, production (#5)
- Arden Altino – arrangement, production (#5)
- C-murder – pre-production recording (#8–#9)
- Coptic – remixing (#11)
- Tom Coyne – mastering
- Digga – additional remix production (#12)
- DJ Watarai – arrangement, production (#4)
- DJ Yutaka – arrangement, production (#8–#9)
- D.O.I – mixing (#4–6, #8–#12, #14)
- D/R Period – production (#6), original version arrangement (#11), original version production (#11)
- Icedown – production (#14)
- The Insomniax – arrangement, production (#10)
- Jin – arrangement, production, strings arrangement (#4)
- JYP – original version arrangement, original version production (#12)
- Hiroki Kashiwagi – head strings arrangement (#4)
- Futoshi Kawashima – strings arrangement (#4)
- Martin Kierszenbaum – arrangement, production (#13)
- T. Kura – arrangement, mixing, production (#1–#2, #15)
- Kwon Tae Eun – original version arrangement, original version production (#12)
- OQD – recording (#1–#6, #8–#10, No. 12, #14–#15)
- The Orange Factory – remixing (#12)
- Dave "Hard-Drive" Pensato – mixing (#13)
- Shingo S. – keyboard arrangement (#8)
- Kaori Sawada – keyboard arrangement (#9)
- Brian Stanley – mixing (#12)
- Tony Ugval – recording (#13)

== Charts ==
Chart performance for What's Goin' On Ai
Chart (2006)	Peak position
Japan Oricon weekly albums	2
Japan Oricon yearly albums	60
Taiwan G-Music J-Pop Chart	11

== Sales and certifications ==
Chart	Amount
Oricon physical sales	218,000
RIAJ physical shipping certification	Platinum (250,000+)

== Release history ==
Release history and formats for What's Goin' On Ai
Region	Date	Format(s)	Label	Ref.
Japan	September 27, 2006	CD; digital download; streaming	Island; Universal Sigma	
Taiwan	October 5, 2006	CD; digital download; streaming	Universal Taiwan	
South Korea	November 26, 2003	CD; digital download; streaming	Universal Korea	
Various	December 5, 2012	CD; digital download; streaming	USM Japan	
