= Pray (film) =

- Theatrical poster
- Directed by: Yuichi Sato
- Written by: Tomoko Ogawa
- Produced by: Satoshi Fukushima
- Starring: Tetsuji Tamayama; Asami Mizukawa
- Distributed by: Tartan Films
- Release date: 2005
- Running time: 77 min.
- Country: Japan
- Language: Japanese

Pray (絶対恐怖プレイ, Zettai Kyōfu Purei) is a 2005 Japanese film directed by Yuichi Sato, starring Tetsuji Tamayama and Asami Mizukawa.

== Plot ==
Two young adults, Mitsuru and his girlfriend, Maki, kidnap a little girl and hold her for ransom to pay off a drug-related debt. As they hide out at an abandoned school, they attempt to call the girl's parents only to find out from her parents she has been dead for a year. Mitsuru's friends also arrive, with ulterior motives of their own.

Soon, members of the group are brutally killed by an unseen force. Is the mysterious little girl responsible, or is something far more sinister at work?
