= Story (Ai song) =

2005 single by Ai

Single by Ai

from the album Mic-a-holic Ai
- Language: Japanese
- B-side: "Passion"
- Released: May 18, 2005
- Genre: R&B; J-pop
- Length: 4:49
- Label: Island; Universal Sigma
- Songwriter: Ai Uemura
- Producer: 2Soul

Ai singles chronology
"Crayon Beats" (2005)	"Story" (2005)	"Believe" (2006)

Music video
- "Story" on YouTube

"Story" is a song written and recorded by Japanese-American singer-songwriter Ai. It was released on May 18, 2005, by Island Records and Universal Sigma. The song served as the second single from Ai's fourth studio album, Mic-a-holic Ai.

Produced by 2Soul, "Story" became one of the biggest singles of the 2000s in Japan, peaking at number 8 on the Japanese Oricon singles chart, and was the sixth single in history to receive a triple million digital certification by the Recording Industry Association of Japan (RIAJ).

== Background and release ==
Ai previously released "365", the lead single for her then-upcoming fourth studio album. The song was used for a commercial tie-up in 2005.

"Story" was announced and released in May 2005.

== Composition and lyrics ==
"Story" is a R&B ballad song. Lyrically, the song is about relationships with a significant other.

== Commercial performance ==
Upon its release, "Story" became a sleeper hit, charting for 20 weeks in the top 30 in 2005 and 2006, however went on to sell over three million ringtones, one million cellphone downloads, and 270,000 physical copies. The single charted for 72 weeks total on the Oricon singles chart. In 2009, the song debuted at number 24 on the Billboard Japan Hot 100 with the reborn version included on Ai's greatest hits album, Best Ai. It later peaked at number 7 in its third week on the chart.

Near the end of 2014, "Story" re-entered Japanese charts following the Japanese release of the animated film Big Hero 6, reaching a new peak on the Japan Hot 100 at number 18.

== Music video ==
A music video for "Story" aired on MTV Japan in mid-2005.

In 2014, the music video for "Story" was released on Ai's Vevo channel on YouTube. A sand art music video was released near the end of 2015 to commemorate the release of Ai's greatest hits album, The Best.

On February 13, 2025, Ai released a new music video for "Story". Directed by Won, critics described the music video as a "drama-style" video with the theme of "love and family".

== Accolades ==
Year	Organization	Award/work	Result
2006	MTV Video Music Awards Japan	Best R&B Video	Won
2025	Music Awards Japan	Best Japanese R&B/Contemporary Songs	Nominated

== Live performances ==
Since the release of "Story" in 2005, Ai has performed the song multiple times live. Ai performed "Story" at the 56th NHK Kōhaku Uta Gassen music competition on December 31, 2005, her first appearance on the program. In 2008, she performed the song at the El Rey Theatre, which marked her debut live performance in the United States. In 2009, she performed the song at the 3rd Asia Pacific Screen Awards.

== Charts ==
=== Weekly charts ===
2005 chart performance for "Story"
Chart (2005)	Peak position
Japan (Oricon)	8
Sound Scan Japan	4

2009 chart performance for "Story"
Chart (2009)	Peak position
Japan Hot 100 (Billboard Japan) (Re-born)	7
Japan Hot 100 (Billboard Japan)	67

2014–2015 chart performance for "Story"
Chart (2014–2015)	Peak position
Japan Hot 100 (Billboard Japan)	18
Japan Hot Animation (Billboard Japan)	3

2024 chart performance for "Story"
Chart (2024)	Peak position
Hot Shot Songs (Billboard Japan)	19

=== Year-end charts ===
Year-end chart performance for "Story"
Chart (2005)	Position
Japan (Oricon)	43

== Certifications ==
Certifications and sales for "Story"
Region	Certification	Certified units/sales
Japan (RIAJ) Single track	2× Million	2,000,000^{*}
Japan (RIAJ) Full-length ringtone	Million	1,000,000^{*}
Japan (RIAJ) PC download	Platinum	250,000^{*}
Japan (RIAJ) Streaming	Platinum	100,000,000^{†}
^{*} Sales figures based on certification alone.^{†} Streaming-only figures based on certification alone.

== Cover versions ==
"Story" has been covered by many Japanese artists on albums and live performances. Most notable covers are Makato Ozone's, Ms. Ooja's and May J.'s.

== Track listing ==
- Digital download, streaming and CD
1. "Story" – 4:49
2. "Passion" – 3:44
3. "Story" (instrumental) – 4:49
4. "Passion" (instrumental) – 3:44
- 7-inch vinyl
1. "Story" – 4:49
2. "Story" (English version) – 4:51

== Story (English Version) ==
"Story (English Version)"

Single by Ai

from the album Big Hero 6 (Original Motion Picture Soundtrack)
- Released: October 21, 2014
- Recorded: 2005
- Genre: R&B
- Length: 4:50
- Label: EMI; Universal; Walt Disney
- Songwriter: Ai Uemura
- Producer: 2Soul

Ai singles chronology
"Dear Mama" (2013)	"Story (English Version)" (2014)	"Let It Be" (2014)

Music video
- "Story (English Version)" on YouTube

On October 21, 2014, it was revealed that an unreleased English version of "Story" would be used in Disney's 2014 animated film, Big Hero 6 for the Japanese dub. The song was released digitally as a single from the film's soundtrack on October 22, 2014 by EMI Records and Walt Disney Music in Japan. Regarding the song being included in the movie, Ai commented, "I was very happy to have sung 'Story' instead of a new song. Even if we sometimes feel uneasy or lonely, people always connect with someone." The song was used in the closing credits for the Japanese release. For the single cover photo, Ai is pictured with her sister, Sachi Uemura.

=== Music video ===
A music video was released on January 27, 2015. Throughout the video, photos of loved ones submitted by fans are shown in the video.

== Release history ==
Release history and formats for "Story"
Region	Date	Format(s)	Version	Label	Ref.
Japan	May 18, 2005	Digital download; streaming; CD	Maxi	Island; Universal Sigma	
Japan	October 21, 2014	Digital download; streaming	English	EMI	
Japan	February 26, 2025	7-inch vinyl	Vinyl (+ "Story (English Version))	EMI	
Various	February 28, 2025	7-inch vinyl	Vinyl (+ "Story (English Version))	EMI; Universal	

== See also ==
- List of best-selling singles in Japan
