= My Name Is Ai =

Studio album by Ai
- Released: November 2, 2001
- Recorded: 2000–2001
- Studios: Flash Light (Tokyo, Japan)
- Genres: R&B; J-pop; hip hop
- Length: 67:11
- Languages: Japanese; English
- Labels: RCA; BMG Fun House
- Producers: Shinnosuke; Junkoo; Ars Wizard C-VE

Ai chronology
My Name Is Ai (2001)	Original Ai (2003)

Singles from My Name Is Ai
- 1. "Cry, Just Cry" Released: November 22, 2000; 2. "U Can Do" Released: May 23, 2001; 3. "Shining Star" Released: September 5, 2001

My Name Is Ai (stylized my name is AI) is the debut studio album by Japanese–American singer-songwriter Ai, released on November 2, 2001, by RCA Records and BMG Fun House.

Three singles were released from My Name Is Ai, "Cry, Just Cry", "U Can Do" and "Shining Star". While the first two failed to chart, "Shining Star" charted and peaked at number 98 on the Oricon Singles Chart.

Although not commercially successful, My Name Is Ai peaked at number 86 on the Oricon albums chart.

== Background ==
Ai developed an interest to become a singer in her early adolescence. After graduating from junior high school in Japan, Ai returned to her hometown, Los Angeles, California, to attend high school. Initially attending Glendale High School, Ai later switched to Los Angeles Count High School for the Arts, majoring in ballet. In 1998, she appeared as a dancer in Janet Jackson's song "Go Deep".

In 1999, Ai joined an Asian girl group called SX4. While on holiday in Kagoshima, she performed Monica's "For You I Will", which led to her being scouted by BMG. Deciding to take the offer, Ai left SX4 and moved to Tokyo after graduating high school in 2000, signing to BMG Japan's RCA Records label.

== Track listing ==
My Name Is Ai
No.	Title	Writer(s)	Producer(s)	Length
1.	"Born to Sing" (Introduction)	Ai Carina Uemura		0:47
2.	"Inori"	Uemura; Takuya Harada	Shinnosuke	4:47
3.	"Triangle"	Uemura; Shinnosuke	Shinnosuke	4:22
4.	"U Can Do"	Uemura; Diggy-Mo; Shinnosukue	Shinnosuke	3:57
5.	"Shining Star" (R&B Version)	Uemura; Harada	Junkoo	5:12
6.	"Protect You"	Uemura; Yukio Mitsui; Genki Hibino	Shinnosuke	4:38
7.	"Memory"	Harada	Ars Wizard C-VE	4:22
8.	"Depend On Me"	Uemura; Junkoo	Junkoo	5:33
9.	"Thank You Lord" (Interlude)	Uemura		0:47
10.	"Shut Out" (featuring Diggy-Mo of Soul'd Out)	Uemura; Diggy-Mo; Takashi Shimizu	Ars Wizard C-VE	5:07
11.	"Why U Trippin?"	Uemura; Shimizu	Ars Wizard C-VE	4:53
12.	"I Wish"	Uemura; Junkoo	Junkoo	6:23
13.	"Hold On"	Uemura; Junkoo	Junkoo	4:41
14.	"Cry, Just Cry"	Uemura; Junkoo	Junkoo	5:12
15.	"Show Off!!"	Uemura; Masaaki Iwami	Junkoo	3:19
16.	"Love" (Interlude)	Uemura		0:29
17.	"My Destiny"	Uemura; Shimizu	Ars Wizard C-VE	6:02
Total length:				67:11

=== Notes ===
- Tracks 2–4, 6, 10, 12, and 15–16 are stylized in all capitals.
- Track 14 is stylized as "Cry, just Cry"

== Personnel ==
Credits adapted from album's liner notes.

=== Musicians ===
- Ai Carina Uemura – lead vocals, songwriting
- Takuya Harada – songwriting
- Shinnosukue – arrangement, songwriting, production
- Junkoo – arrangement, songwriting, production, piano
- Genki Hibino – songwriting
- Yukiko Mitsui – songwriting
- Ars Wizard C-VE – arrangement, songwriting, production
- Diggy-Mo – songwriting, vocals
- Takao Sugiyama – piano
- Masahiko Rokukawa – bass
- Ichiro Hada – guitar
- Kazu Minamisawa – guitar
- Kouyo Murakami – trombone
- Kazuo Kamata – sax
- Mikio Saito – trumpet
- To-Go – guitar
- Aogu – DJ
- Dave Fromm – background vocals
- Jun – background vocals
- Tsuyoshi – background vocals
- Peco – background vocals
- Masaaki Iwami – songwriting

=== Technical ===
- Masaaki Iwami –mixing
- T. Takizawaa – mixing
- T. Kobayashi – mixing
- Don Katsumoto – sound production
- Ars Wizard CV-E – direction
- Junkoo – assistant direction
- Shinnosuke – assistant direction
- Yukihiro Yahagi – mastering

=== Visuals and imagery ===
- Anthony Nishikawa – art direction
- Yoshihiro Sugawara – design
- Kazuya Morishima – photographer
- Ai Carina Uemura – photographer
- Rie Inada – hair, makeup
- Shuhei Yomo – styling
- Mika Itagaki – styling

== Charts ==
Chart performance for My Name Is Ai
Chart (2001)	Peak position
Japanese Albums (Oricon)	86

== Aftermath ==
Following BMG selling its 50% share of Sony BMG in 2008 to the Sony Corporation of America, RCA's Japan division was rebranded as Ariola Japan. Subsequently, the ownership of the masters of My Name Is Ai was transferred to Sony Music Japan. Though physical copies are still manufactured by Sony Japan under their Ariola Japan label, the album was never formerly released to digital stores.

== Release history ==
Release history and formats for My Name Is Ai
Region	Date	Format(s)	Label	Ref.
Japan	November 2, 2001	CD	RCA; BMG Fun House	
