= Original Ai =

2003 studio album by Ai

- Standard edition cover (Note: On the deluxe edition cover, the clothing is red instead of beige.)

Studio album by Ai
- Released: July 23, 2003
- Recorded: 2003
- Studio: Michael "Lofey" Sandlofer's home studio (New York City, New York); Right Track Studios (New York City); Little Buch Studios; Tai Studio; Folio Sound Studio; Audio Achievements (Hollywood, California); The Studio (Philadelphia, Pennsylvania); Gunpoint (Philadelphia); Purple Velvet Studios; Peninsula
- Genre: J-pop; pop rock; hip hop
- Length: 48:57
- Language: Japanese; English
- Label: Def Jam Japan
- Producer: Lofey; Skane; Desert Storm; 813; Carsten Lindberg; Joachim Svare; Ryousuke Imai; Swing-O; Fatin Horton; Rob "Reef" Tewlow; Stephanie Stokes Fountain; Kazunori Fujimoto

Ai chronology
My Name Is Ai (2001)	Original Ai (2003)	2004 Ai (2004)

Singles from Original Ai
- 1. "Last Words" Released: January 28, 2003; 2. "Thank U" Released: June 25, 2003; 3. "My Friend" / "Merry Christmas Mr. Lawrence" Released: October 15, 2003

Original Ai (stylized in all upper cased lettering) is the second studio album by Japanese–American singer-songwriter Ai. It was released on July 23, 2003, by Def Jam Japan. The album features guest appearances and collaborations from Dabo, American rapper Joe Budden and Sphere of Influence.

Four singles were released from Original Ai. The lead single "Last Words" became Ai's best performing single on the Oricon singles chart until her 2005 single "365".

== Background ==
Ai previously released her debut studio album, My Name Is Ai in 2001 under BMG Japan. Following its very little commercial success, Ai moved to Def Jam Japan and became the first woman signed to the label. Compared to her previous label, Ai stated she felt more at home with Def Jam Japan. Her first release under the label was the lead single "Last Words", which peaked at number 27 on the Japanese Oricon singles chart. The second single "Thank U" was released in June 2003, peaking at number 37 on the Oricon singles chart.

== Impact ==
Original Ai was released in a time where very little female artists were in the hip hop scene in Japan. In 2021, OKMusic's editorial department described Original Ai as "a fine work that shows the high potential of Ai". The journalist noted Ai made history as the first woman signed to Def Jam's Japanese division and helped pave the way for the hip hop and R&B scene in Japan to grow.

== Track listing ==
Original Ai – Standard edition
No.	Title	Writer(s)	Producer(s)	Length
1.	"Last Words" (最終宣告)	Ai Carina Uemura; Lofey; Skane; Desert Storm	Lofey; Skane; Desert Storm	3:23
2.	"2Hot" (featuring Sphere of Influence)	Uemura; Sphere of Influence; George Brown	813	4:16
3.	"Summer Time"	Uemura	813	3:37
4.	"Thank U"	Uemura; Emanuel Officer; Carsten Lindberg; Joachim Svare	Lindberg; Svare	4:16
5.	"Paradise"	Uemura; Ryousuke Imai	Imai	4:42
6.	"Playboy" (featuring Dabo)	Uemura; Ashida Daisuke; Lofey; Skane; Desert Storm	Lofey; Desert Storm; Skane	4:00
7.	"Girl's Talk"	Uemura; Michico	Lofey; Desert Storm; Skane	3:12
8.	"2 Face"	Uemura; Swing-O	Swing-O; Fatin Horton	3:57
9.	"Kotonone" (言ノ音)	Uemura; Rob "Reef" Tewlow	Teelow	3:45
10.	"Life"	Uemura; Stephanie Stokes Fountain	S. Fountain; Michael Fountain^{[a]}	4:56
11.	"My Friend"	Uemura; Kazunori Fujimoto	Fujimoto	4:23
12.	"Last Words" (featuring Joe Budden)	Uemura; Budden; Lofey; Skane; Desert Storm	Lofey; Desert Storm; Skane	4:24
Total length:				48:57

Original Ai – Physical deluxe edition
No.	Title	Writer(s)	Length
13.	"Merry Christmas Mr. Lawrence" (戦場のメリークリスマス)	Ryuichi Sakamoto

Notes

- ^{^[a]} signifies a co-producer
- Tracks 1, 9 and 13 are titled in Japanese.
- Tracks 2, 5, 6, 10, and 12 are stylized in all capitals.
- "2Hot" interpolates Kool & the Gang's 1979 song "Too Hot" written by Brown.
- "Summer Time" interpolates R. Kelly's 2002 song "Ignition (Remix)" written by Kelly.

== Personnel ==
Credits adapted from album's liner notes and Tidal.

Musicians

- Ai Carina Uemura – vocals
- Cartsen Lindberg – instrumental (4)
- Joachim Svare – instrumental (4)
- Mine-chang – electric guitar (5)
- Michico – background vocals (7)
- DJ Miz – cuts (8)
- Damon Bennet – keyboard (8), flute (10)
- Swing-O – keyboard (8)
- Eric Harvey – cuts (10)
- John Kegler – bass guitar (10)

Technical

- Bob Horn – engineering, mixing (1, 12)
- Yukiko Matsushita – engineering (2, 6, 7)
- Sumiya Ishikawa – engineering (2)
- Chisaki – mixing (2)
- Troy Staton – engineering, mixing (3)
- Joachim Svare – engineering, mixing (4)
- Carsten Lindberg – engineering, mixing (4)
- Yoshiaki Onshi – engineering, mixing (5, 11)
- Makoto Hoshino – rap recording (6)
- Chris Conway – mixing (6)
- Bob Iadeluca – mixing (7)
- Swing-O – chorus arrangement (8), programing (8)
- Masato Watanabe – mixing (8)
- Blair Wells – engineering (9)
- Chris Conway – mixing (9)
- Michael Fountain – engineering (10)
- Stephanie Stokes Fountain – engineering (10)
- Carlos "Storm" Martinez – engineering (10)
- Takeshi Hirata – engineering (11)
- Masaki Shmizu – engineering assistance (11)
- Chris Gehringer – mastering

Visuals and imagery

- Hiroaki Doi – art direction, design
- Toru Wada – design
- Satoshi Minakawa – photography
- Rie Inada – hair, makeup
- Noriko Gotoh – stylist
- Teknical – tag
- Mayuko Sudo – coordination

== Charts ==
Chart performance for Original Ai
Chart (2003)	Peak position
Japanese Albums (Oricon)	15

== Release history ==
Release history and formats for Original Ai
Region	Date	Format(s)	Version	Label	Ref.
Japan	July 23, 2003	Digital download; streaming	Standard	Def Jam Japan; Universal	
Japan	July 23, 2003	CD	Standard	Universal Japan	
Japan	November 26, 2003	Digital download; streaming	Deluxe	Def Jam Japan; Universal	
Japan	November 26, 2003	CD	Deluxe	Universal Japan	
Various	December 5, 2012	CD; digital download; streaming	Standard	USM Japan	
