= Miliyah Kato discography =

- Studio albums: 13
- EPs: 2
- Compilation albums: 5
- Singles: 70
- Video albums: 14
- Collaborative albums: 1
- Remix albums: 1
- Cover albums: 15
- Tribute albums: 1
- Promotional singles: 28

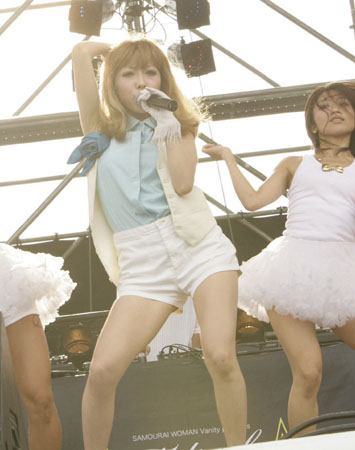
Miliyah Kato performs on July 18, 2009.

Japanese singer and songwriter Miliyah Kato has released thirteen studio albums, six compilation albums, two EPs, one remix album, one cover album, one tribute album, 70 singles, and 28 promotional singles. She has sold over 9 million records in Japan, making her one of the best-selling and most-downloaded artist in the country of all time. Kato has been named as "the charisma of the high school girls" and "the queen of the unrequited love songs" by several media.

Kato's career began as the featured vocalist on Reggae Disco Rockers' song "Cherry Oh! Baby" in 2003. In October 2005, she released her debut album, Rose. It debuted at number two on the Oricon weekly albums chart and produced the singles "Never Let Go", "Yozora", "Beautiful", "Dear Lonely Girl", and "Jōnetsu". The latter two singles has been certified gold by the Recording Industry Association of Japan (RIAJ). Her second studio album, Diamond Princess (2007) was a moderate hit, peaking at number five on the Oricon and produced the singles "Sotsugyō", "Last Summer", "I Will", and "Eyes on You". In October 2007, Kato released "Lalala" featuring Wakadannna, which became her first top ten and double platinum-certified song. The song was later included on her third studio album Tokyo Star (2008), which produced the singles "Love Is...", "Lalala", "Futurecheka", and the double platinum single, "19 Memories". Kato's first compilation album, Best Destiny (2008) became her first number one hit, and was later certified platinum.

Her fourth studio album Ring (2009) marked Kato's commercial breakthrough, peaking at number two and selling over 380,000 copies nationwide. It produced the four singles, "Sayonara Baby", "Koi Shiteru", "20 -Cry-", and "Love Forever", all of which reached top ten on the Oricon chart. The collaborative single with Shota Shimizu, "Love Forever", became her first number-one single on the Billboard Japan Hot 100, and was later certified million in Japan. The promotional single from the album, "Aitai" topped on the RIAJ Digital Track Chart and was certified triple-platinum. As of June 2020, the ringtone of the song has sold over 3.3 million units nationwide. Kato's fifth studio album, Heaven was released in July 2010 and debuted atop on the Oricon chart. The album's first two singles, "Why" and "Bye Bye", both reached the top ten on the Oricon chart, whilst the third single "Last Love" was certified platinum, while peaking at number 13 on the Oricon chart. Kato's second collaborative single with Shota Shimizu, "Forever Love" was released in 2010 and reached number three on the Japan Hot 100. Kato released her second compilation album, M Best in August 2011, which debuted atop on the Oricon chart and became the 19th best-selling album in the year in Japan.

Kato's sixth studio album True Lovers (2012), which peaked at number two on the Oricon chart, produced five singles, including the two top-ten singles "Yūsha Tachi" and "Heart Beat". In February 2014, Kato released her seventh studio album, Loveland, which reached number three in Japan. The album's highest charting single was "Love/Affection", which peaked at number ten on the Japan Hot 100, whilst its second single "Lonely Hearts" has been certified gold in Japan. Kato released her first and last collaborative album with Shimizu, The Best in April 2014, which peaked at number four on the Oricon chart. The singles from the album has sold over 8 million digital units, including the ringtone sales. Kato's eighth studio album Liberty (2016) debuted at number four on the Oricon chart. The album produced four singles, including the two top-forty hits, "Shonen Shojo" and "Future Lover -Mirai Koibito-". Kato's ninth studio album Utopia was released in April 2017. The album peaked at number five in Japan and produced two singles "Saikouna Shiawase" and the Japanese theme song to the film Moana, "Dokomademo: How Far I'll Go", which peaked at number 12 on the Japan Hot 100. Kato's tenth studio album Femme Fatale (2018) reached number eight on the Oricon chart. The album produced two singles "Shinyaku Dear Lonely Girl" and "Romance". Kato's fourth compilation album M Best II was released in November 2019 and produced two singles, including the top-forty hit "Ai ga Furu". In October and November 2020, Kato released her first cover album and tribute album, Covers -Woman & Man- and Inspire, both reaching number fifty on the Oricon chart. Her eleventh studio album Who Loves Me was released in October 2021, managing to peak at number 25 in Japan.

== Albums ==
=== Studio albums ===
List of studio albums, with selected chart positions
Title	Album details	Peak positions		Sales	Certifications
Title	Album details	JPN Oricon	JPN Hot (Note: The Billboard Japan Hot Albums chart was established in June 2015.)	Sales	Certifications
Rose	Released: October 26, 2005; Label: Mastersix Foundation; Formats: CD, digital download, streaming	2	—	JPN: 238,000	RIAJ: Platinum
Diamond Princess	Released: March 7, 2007; Label: Mastersix Foundation; Formats: CD, digital download, streaming	5	—	JPN: 107,000	RIAJ: Gold
Tokyo Star	Released: April 2, 2008; Label: Mastersix Foundation; Formats: CD, digital download, streaming	4	— (Note: Tokyo Star did not enter the Billboard Japan Hot Albums Chart, but peaked at number 3 on the Billboard Japan Top Album Sales Chart.)	JPN: 207,000	RIAJ: Platinum
Ring	Released: July 8, 2009; Label: Mastersix Foundation; Formats: CD, digital download, streaming	2	— (Note: Ring did not enter the Billboard Japan Hot Albums Chart, but peaked at number 2 on the Billboard Japan Top Album Sales Chart.)	JPN: 384,000	RIAJ: Platinum
Heaven	Released: July 28, 2010; Label: Mastersix Foundation; Formats: CD, digital download, streaming	1	— (Note: Heaven did not enter the Billboard Japan Hot Albums Chart, but peaked at number 1 on the Billboard Japan Top Album Sales Chart.)	JPN: 266,000	RIAJ: Platinum
True Lovers	Released: November 21, 2012; Label: Mastersix Foundation; Formats: CD, digital download, streaming	2	— (Note: True Lovers did not enter the Billboard Japan Hot Albums Chart, but peaked at number 2 on the Billboard Japan Top Album Sales Chart.)	JPN: 110,000	RIAJ: Gold
Loveland	Released: February 19, 2014; Label: Mastersix Foundation; Formats: CD, digital download, streaming	3	— (Note: Loveland did not enter the Billboard Japan Hot Albums Chart, but peaked at number 3 on the Billboard Japan Top Album Sales Chart.)	JPN: 51,000	
Liberty	Released: March 2, 2016; Label: Mastersix Foundation; Formats: CD, digital download, streaming	4	6	JPN: 22,000	
Utopia	Released: April 12, 2017; Label: Mastersix Foundation; Formats: CD, digital download, streaming	5	6	JPN: 14,000	
Femme Fatale	Released: June 20, 2018; Label: Mastersix Foundation; Formats: CD, digital download, streaming	8	12	JPN: 7,000	
Who Loves Me	Released: October 13, 2021; Label: Mastersix Foundation; Formats: CD, digital download, streaming	25	24	JPN: 2,000	
Blonde16	Released: April 5, 2023; Label: Mastersix Foundation; Formats: CD, digital download, streaming	24	27	JPN: 1,240	
Velvet Grace	Released: March 18, 2026; Label: Mastersix Foundation; Formats: CD, digital download, streaming	68	—	JPN: 1,000	
"—" denotes releases that did not chart or were not released in that region.

=== Compilation albums ===
List of compilation albums, with selected chart positions
Title	Album details	Peak positions		Sales	Certifications
Title	Album details	JPN	JPN Hot (Note: The Billboard Japan Hot Albums chart was established in June 2015.)	Sales	Certifications
Best Destiny	Released: November 5, 2008; Label: Mastersix Foundation; Formats: CD, digital download	1	— (Note: Best Destiny did not enter the Billboard Japan Hot Albums Chart, but peaked at number 1 on the Billboard Japan Top Album Sales Chart.)	JPN: 223,000	RIAJ: Platinum
M Best	Released: August 3, 2011; Label: Mastersix Foundation; Formats: CD, digital download	1	— (Note: M Best did not enter the Billboard Japan Hot Albums Chart, but peaked at number 1 on the Billboard Japan Top Album Sales Chart.)	JPN: 308,000	RIAJ: Platinum
Muse	Released: October 29, 2014; Label: Sony Music Japan; Formats: CD, digital download	9	— (Note: Muse did not enter the Billboard Japan Hot Albums Chart, but peaked at number 6 on the Billboard Japan Top Album Sales Chart.)	JPN: 31,000	
M Best II	Released: November 27, 2019; Label: Sony Music Japan; Formats: CD, digital download	20	22	JPN: 8,100	
M Best -Fan's Selection-	Released: December 25, 2019; Label: Sony Music Japan; Formats: digital download	—	— (Note: M Best -Fan's Selection- did not enter the Billboard Japan Hot Albums Chart, but peaked at number 97 on the Billboard Japan Top Download Albums Chart.)		
"—" denotes releases that did not chart or were not released in that region.

=== Collaborative albums ===
List of collaborative albums, with selected chart positions
Title	Album details	Peak positions	Sales
Title	Album details	JPN	Sales
The Best	Released as Miliyah Kato x Shota Shimizu; Released: April 2, 2014; Label: Mastersix Foundation; Formats: CD, digital download	4	JPN: 51,000

=== Cover albums ===
List of cover albums, with selected chart positions
Title	Album details	Peak positions		Sales
Title	Album details	JPN	JPN Hot (Note: The Billboard Japan Hot Albums chart was established in June 2015.)	Sales
Covers -Woman & Man-	Released: November 25, 2020; Label: Sony Music Japan; Formats: CD, digital download	46	37	JPN: 2,600

=== Remix albums ===
List of remix albums, with selected chart positions
Title	Album details	Peak positions		Sales
Title	Album details	JPN	JPN Hot (Note: The Billboard Japan Hot Albums chart was established in June 2015.)	Sales
Kato Miliyah M-Mix: Mastermix Vol.1	Released: July 29, 2015; Label: Mastersix Foundation; Formats: CD, digital download	22	29	JPN: 7,400

=== Tribute albums ===
List of tribute albums, with selected chart positions
Title	Album details	Peak positions		Sales
Title	Album details	JPN	JPN Hot (Note: The Billboard Japan Hot Albums chart was established in June 2015.)	Sales
Inspire	Released: October 28, 2020; Label: Sony Music Japan; Formats: CD, digital download	43	40	JPN CD: 1,800

=== Video albums ===
List of video albums, with selected chart positions
Title	Album details	Peak positions	
Title	Album details	JPN DVD	JPN Blu-ray
Diamond Princess Tour 2007	Released: December 12, 2007; Label: Mastersix Foundation; Format: DVD	22	—
Tokyo Star Tour 2008	Released: December 10, 2008; Label: Mastersix Foundation; Format: DVD	11	—
Ring Tour 2009	Released: May 26, 2010; Label: Mastersix Foundation; Format: DVD	2	—
Eternal Heaven Tour 2010–2011	Released: December 8, 2010; Label: Mastersix Foundation; Format: DVD	4	—
Miliyah the Clips 2004–2010	Release: November 2, 2011; Label: Mastersix Foundation; Format: DVD, Blu-ray	2	16
M Best Tour 2011	Release: December 12, 2012; Label: Mastersix Foundation; Format: DVD, Blu-ray	5	31
True Lovers Tour 2013	Release: February 19, 2014; Label: Mastersix Foundation; Format: DVD, Blu-ray	4	29
Loveland Tour 2014	Release: February 25, 2015; Label: Mastersix Foundation; Format: DVD, Blu-ray	13	81
The Best 2 Man Tour 2014	Released as Miliyah Kato x Shota Shimizu; Release: April 22, 2015; Label: Mastersix Foundation; Format: DVD, Blu-ray	7	69
10th Anniversary "A Muse" Tour 2015	Release: April 6, 2016; Label: Mastersix Foundation; Format: DVD, Blu-ray	10	41
Dramatic Liberty Tour 2016	Release: January 11, 2017; Label: Mastersix Foundation; Format: DVD, Blu-ray	5	32
Utopia Tour 2017	Release: January 17, 2018; Label: Mastersix Foundation; Format: DVD, Blu-ray	14	29
Celebration Tour 2018	Release: November 21, 2018; Label: Sony Music Japan; Format: DVD, Blu-ray	13	61
15th Anniversary Miliyah Budokan 2020	Release: March 17, 2021; Label: Sony Music Japan; Format: DVD, Blu-ray	16	48
"—" denotes releases that did not chart or were not released in that region.

== Extended plays ==
List of extended plays, with selected chart positions
Title	EP details	Peak positions		Sales
Title	EP details	JPN	JPN Hot (Note: The Billboard Japan Hot Albums chart was established in June 2015.)	Sales
M's X'Mas	Released: December 17, 2014; Label: Mastersix Foundation; Formats: digital download	—	—	
I Hate You	Released: March 21, 2018; Label: Mastersix Foundation; Formats: CD, digital download	37	46	JPN: 1,900
"—" denotes releases that did not chart or were not released in that region.

== Singles ==
=== As lead artist ===
List of singles, with selected chart positions
Title	Year	Peak chart positions			Sales	Certifications	Album
Title	Year	JPN Oricon	JPN Hot 100	RIAJ Digital Track Chart† (Note: The RIAJ Digital Track Chart is a depreciated chart that ran from 2009 until early 2012 and tracked full-length cellphone downloads.)	Sales	Certifications	Album
"Never Let Go"	2004	15	—	—	JPN CD: 45,000		Rose
"Yozora"	2004	15	—	—	JPN CD: 45,000		Rose
"Beautiful"	2004	26	—	—	JPN CD: 16,000		Rose
"Dear Lonely Girl"	2005	15	—	80	JPN CD: 50,000; JPN DL: 100,000+	RIAJ: Gold (DL)	Rose
"Jōnetsu"	2005	11	—	—	JPN CD: 42,000; JPN DL: 100,000+	RIAJ: Gold (DL)	Rose
"Sotsugyō"	2006	23	—	—	JPN CD: 14,000; JPN DL: 100,000+	RIAJ: Gold (DL)	Diamond Princes
"Last Summer"	2006	30	—	—	JPN CD: 14,000		Diamond Princes
"I Will"	2006	17	—	44	JPN CD: 18,000		Diamond Princes
"Eyes on You"	2007	13	—	70	JPN CD: 25,000; JPN DL: 100,000+	RIAJ: Gold (DL)	Diamond Princes
"My Girl" (featuring Color)	2007	29	—	42	JPN CD: 10,000		Non-album singles
"Love Is..."	2007	11	—	33	JPN CD: 26,000; JPN DL: 250,000+	RIAJ: Platinum (DL)	Tokyo Star
"Lalala" (featuring Wakadanna)	2007	7	—	5	JPN CD: 49,000; JPN DL: 500,000+; JPN Ringtone: 500,000+	RIAJ: 2×Platinum (DL); RIAJ: 2×Platinum (Ringtone)	Tokyo Star
"Futurechecka" (featuring Simon, Coma-Chi and Taro Soul)	2007	7	—	—	JPN CD: 49,000		Tokyo Star
"19 Memories"	2008	16	17	6	JPN CD: 24,000; JPN DL: 500,000+; JPN Ringtone: 500,000+	RIAJ: 2×Platinum (DL); RIAJ: 2×Platinum (Ringtone)	Tokyo Star
"Saigo no I Love You"	2008	—	—	28	JPN DL: 100,000+	RIAJ: Gold (DL)	Tokyo Star
"Sayonara Baby"	2008	9	10	9	JPN CD: 26,000; JPN DL: 250,000+	RIAJ: Platinum (DL); RIAJ: Gold (Streaming)	Ring
"Koi Shiteru"	2008	9	76	43	JPN CD: 26,000		Ring
"20 -Cry-"	2009	7	7	18	JPN CD: 25,000; JPN DL: 250,000+	RIAJ: Platinum (DL)	Ring
"Love Forever" (with Shota Shimizu)	2009	5	1	2	JPN CD: 90,000; JPN DL: 1,000,000+; JPN Ringtone: 1,000,000+	RIAJ: Gold (CD); RIAJ: Million (DL); RIAJ: Million (Ringtone); RIAJ: Platinum (Streaming)	Ring; The Best
"Why"	2009	10	8	2	JPN CD: 29,000; JPN DL: 250,000+	RIAJ: Platinum (DL)	Heaven
"Forever Love" (with Shota Shimizu)	2010	4	3	1	JPN CD: 60,000; JPN DL: 500,000+; JPN Ringtone: 750,000+	RIAJ: 2×Platinum (DL); RIAJ: 3×Platinum (Ringtone)	The Best
"Bye Bye"	2010	8	4	1	JPN CD: 19,000; JPN DL: 100,000+	RIAJ: Gold (DL)	Heaven
"Last Love"	2010	13	40	2	JPN CD: 17,000; JPN DL: 250,000+	RIAJ: Platinum (DL)	Heaven
"Yūsha Tachi"	2011	8	13	7	JPN CD: 13,000; JPN DL: 100,000+	RIAJ: Gold (DL)	M Best; True Lovers
"Desire"	2011	13	41	26	JPN CD: 9,300		M Best
"Baby! Baby! Baby!"	2011	13	—	10	JPN CD: 9,300		M Best
"Believe" (with Shota Shimizu)	2011	9	11	2	JPN CD: 20,000; JPN DL: 100,000+	RIAJ: Gold (DL)	Journey; M Best; The Best
"Roman"	2011	19	18	31	JPN CD: 7,900		True Lovers
"Aiaiai"	2012	16	54	7	JPN CD: 7,700		True Lovers
"Heart Beat"	2012	14	8	1	JPN CD: 26,000; JPN DL: 250,000+	RIAJ: Platinum (DL)	True Lovers
"Lovers Part II" (featuring Wakadanna)	2012	15	13	—	JPN CD: 10,000; JPN DL: 100,000+	RIAJ: Gold (DL)	True Lovers
"Love Story" (with Shota Shimizu)	2013	26	10	—	JPN CD: 10,000		The Best
"Emotion"	2013	26	27	—	JPN CD: 4,400		Loveland
"Lonely Hearts"	2013	17	13	—	JPN CD: 7,000	RIAJ: Gold(DL)	Loveland
"Love/Affection"	2014	23	10	—	JPN CD: 3,700		Loveland
"Kamisama"	2014	23	—	—	JPN CD: 3,700		Loveland
"Fighter" (with Mika Nakashima)	2014	13	19	—	JPN CD: 10,000		Muse
"Gift" (with Mika Nakashima)	2014	13	—	—	JPN CD: 10,000		Muse
"You" (with Izumi Nakasone)	2014	13	15	—	JPN CD: 3,800		Muse
"Shonen Shojo"	2015	27	36	—	JPN CD: 2,600		Liberty
"Piece of Cake -Ai wo Sakebou-" (featuring Kazunobu Mineta)	2015	54	—	—	JPN CD: 1,900		Liberty
"Lipstick"	2015	44	76	—	JPN CD: 3,000		Liberty
"Future Lover -Mirai Koibito-"	2016	42	30	—	JPN CD: 1,500		Liberty
"Saikouna Shiawase"	2016	49	57	—	JPN CD: 2,400		Utopia
"Dokomademo: How Far I'll Go"	2017	49	12	—	JPN CD: 4,200		Utopia
"Shinyaku Dear Lonely Girl"	2017	53	— (Note: "Shinyaku Dear Lonely Girl" did not enter the Billboard Japan Hot 100 Chart, but peaked at number 69 on the Billboard Japan Top Download Songs Chart.)	—	JPN CD: 1,500		M Best II
"Romance"	2018	50	55	—	JPN CD: 1,100		M Best II
"Holy Happy Family"	2018	—	—	—			Non-album single
"Ai Ga Furu"	2019	37	— (Note: "Ai ga Furu" did not enter the Billboard Japan Hot 100 Chart, but peaked at number 93 on the Billboard Japan Top Download Songs Chart.)	—	JPN CD: 1,600		M Best II
"Honto no Boku wo Shitte"	2019	57	— (Note: "Honto no Boku wo Shitte" did not enter the Billboard Japan Hot 100 Chart, but peaked at number 96 on the Billboard Japan Top Download Songs Chart.)	—	JPN CD: 900		M Best II
"Parade"	2019	—	—	—			M Best II
"Sayonara Baby" (featuring Sky-Hi)	2019	—	—	—			M Best II
"Wing"	2020	—	—	—			Who Loves Me
"Shukumei"	2021	—	—	—			Who Loves Me
"Kono Yume ga Sameru Made" (featuring Yoshida Brothers)	2021	44	— (Note: "Kono Yume ga Sameru Made" did not enter the Billboard Japan Hot 100 Chart, but peaked at number 56 on the Billboard Japan Top Download Songs Chart.)	—	JPN CD: 900		Who Loves Me
"Lie Lie Lie"	2022	—	—	—			Blonde16
"Goodbye Darling"	2022	—	—	—			Blonde16
"Cry Me a River"	2022	—	—	—			Blonde16
"Be My Baby" (featuring Yo-Sea)	2022	—	—	—			Blonde16
"Kill My Love"	2022	—	—	—			Blonde16
"Wild & Free"	2022	—	—	—			Blonde16
"Otona Hakusho"	2022	—	—	—			Blonde16
"Prayer"	2023	—	—	—			Non-album singles
"Rock Your Body"	2023	—	—	—			Non-album singles
"Poison" (featuring MUD and Neetz)	2023	—	—	—			Epiphany EP
"No No No"	2024	—	—	—			Non-album single
"Lonely" (featuring Lana)	2024	—	—	—			Epiphany EP & Velvet Grace
"Aigyo" (featuring Ringo Sheena)	2024	—	— (Note: "Aigyo" did not enter the Billboard Japan Hot 100 Chart, but peaked at number 37 on the Billboard Japan Top Download Songs Chart.)	—			Epiphany EP & Velvet Grace
"#Tokyo Life"	2025	—	—	—			Velvet Grace
"One Last Kiss"	2025	—	—	—			Velvet Grace
"—" denotes releases that did not chart or were not released in that region.

=== As featured artist ===
List of singles as featured artist, with selected chart positions
Title	Year	Peak chart positions			Sales	Certifications	Album
Title	Year	JPN Oricon	JPN Hot 100	RIAJ Digital Track Chart† (Note: The RIAJ Digital Track Chart is a depreciated chart that ran from 2009 until early 2012 and tracked full-length cellphone downloads.)	Sales	Certifications	Album
"Shōri no Megami" (Dohzi-T featuring Miliyah Kato)	2004	84	—	—	JPN CD: 9,000		Dōmu
"Better Days" (Dohzi-T featuring Miliyah Kato and Roma Tanaka)	2006	30	—	—	JPN CD: 18,000; JPN DL: 100,000+	RIAJ: Gold (DL)	Warabest: The Best of Dohzi-T
"My People" (Zeebra featuring Miliyah Kato)	2007	44	—	—	JPN CD: 6,000		World of Music
"Stronger" (Ai featuring Miliyah Kato)	2010	26	30	4	JPN CD: 7,000		The Last Ai
"Lovers" (Wakadanna featuring Miliyah Kato)	2012	—	35	—			Life is Mountain
"Lover" (m-flo featuring Miliyah Kato)	2013	81	15	—	JPN CD: 1,000		Neven
"One Day" (Thelma Aoyama featuring Miliyah Kato, Ai)	2016	—	—	—			Pink Tears; Smoke & Tears
"Run 100" (Run the Floor featuring Miliyah Kato and Sway)	2019	—	—	—			THE 4CE
"—" denotes releases that did not chart or were not released in that region.

=== Promotional singles ===
List of promotional singles, with selected chart positions
Title	Year	Peak chart positions		Sales	Certifications	Album
Title	Year	JPN Hot 100	RIAJ Digital Track Chart† (Note: The RIAJ Digital Track Chart is a depreciated chart that ran from 2009 until early 2012 and tracked full-length cellphone downloads.)	Sales	Certifications	Album
"At the Fever" (featuring Twigy, Nipps, Dev Large, Shinnosk8)	2005	—	—			Eyes on You
"24 Hours" (featuring Twigy)	2006	—	—			Last Summer
"For So Long"	2006	—	—			Last Summer
"Kono Mama Zutto Asa Made"	2007	—	92	JPN DL: 100,000+	RIAJ: Gold (DL)	Diamond Princess
"Only Holy"	2010	—	10			Miliyah the Clips 2004–2010; M's X'Mas
"Konya wa Boogie Back" (featuring Shota Shimizu and Shun)	2012	11	—	JPN DL: 100,000+	RIAJ: Gold (DL)	True Lovers
"Run Free" (with Ai and Verbal)	2013	—	—			Motto Moriagaro
"One Night Only"	2014	—	—			Loveland
"Unique"	2014	—	—			Loveland
"Sakura Melody" (with Shota Shimizu)	2014	42	—			The Best
"Escape" (with Shota Shimizu)	2014	—	—			The Best
"I'll Be There with You" (featuring AI and Thelma Aoyama)	2014	—	—			Muse
"For You"	2014	—	—			Utada Hikaru no Uta
"H.I.K.A.R.I."	2016	—	—			Liberty
"Tabibito"	2017	—	—			Utopia
"Eien"	2017	—	—			Utopia
"Utopia"	2017	—	—			Utopia
"Walk to the Dream"	2018	—	—			Romance
"Atashi no Saibo"	2018	—	—			Femme Fatale
"Honnō"	2020	—	—			Covers -Woman & Man-
"Teenage Forever"	2020	—	—			Covers -Woman & Man-
"Joyride"	2021	—	—			Who Loves Me
"Devil Kiss"	2021	—	—			Who Loves Me
"Respect Me"	2023	—	—			Blonde16
"One Night Party"	2023	—	—			Blonde16
"Sayonara Baby" (With Ensemble)	2023	—	—			Blonde16
"Devil Kiss" (With Ensemble)	2023	—	—			Blonde16
"Naimo no Nedari"	2026	—	—			Velvet Grace
"—" denotes releases that did not chart or were not released in that region.

== Other charted songs ==
List of other charted songs, with selected chart positions
Title	Year	Peak chart positions		Sales	Certifications	Album
Title	Year	JPN Hot 100	RIAJ Digital Track Chart† (Note: The RIAJ Digital Track Chart is a depreciated chart that ran from 2009 until early 2012 and tracked full-length cellphone downloads.)	Sales	Certifications	Album
"Better Days -Sweet Love Side-"	2007	—	—	JPN DL: 100,000+	RIAJ: Gold (DL)	Tokyo Star
"I'm Your Angel" (featuring Shota Shimizu)	2007	—	—	JPN DL: 100,000+	RIAJ: Gold (DL)	Céline Dion Tribute
"Ai ga Kieta Hi"	2008	—	31			Best Destiny
"Aitai"	2009	59	1	JPN DL: 750,000+; JPN Ringtone: 750,000+	RIAJ: 3×Platinum (DL); RIAJ: 3×Platinum (Ringtone); RIAJ: Silver (Streaming)	Ring
"Sensation"	2010	—	46			Bye Bye
"Koi ga Owaru Sono Toki ni"	2010	—	35			Bye Bye
"Tomorrow"	2010	—	61			Last Love
"Fallin'"	2010	—	72			Last Love
"X.O.X.O."	2010	39	2	JPN DL: 100,000+	RIAJ: Gold (DL)	Heaven
"Baby I See You" (featuring Verbal)	2010	—	44	JPN DL: 100,000+	RIAJ: Gold (DL)	Heaven
"I Miss You"	2010	—	89			Heaven
"Me"	2011	—	49			M Best
"Rainbow"	2011	—	80			M Best
"Baby Tell Me"	2011	—	22			Roman
"—" denotes releases that did not chart or were not released in that region.

== Guest appearances ==
List of non-single guest appearances, with other performing artists, showing year released and album name
Title	Year	Other artist(s)	Album
"Cherry Oh! Baby"	2003	Reggae Disco Rockers	Reggae Magic
"Paradise"	2005	Heartsdales	Super Star
"In the Night"	2005	V.A.	We Love Dance Classics Vol.1
"Sunshine"	2005	KM-MARKIT	Vivid
"One Day"	2005	m-flo	Beat Space Nine
"Righ' Now!"	2006	Twigy, You the Rock★	Thing Twice
"Michelle"	2006	Yuji Ohno, Lupintic Five	Lupin III TV Special Seven Days Rhapsody Original Soundtrack
"Me & My..."	2006	KM-MARKIT	Mark Out
"Hikaru Mirai"	2007	Dohzi-T	One MIC
"Turn It Up"	2009	m-flo, Verbal, Little, Kohei Japan	M-Flo Inside: Works Best III
"I Miss You"	2013	Daishi Dance	New Party!
"Last Forever"	2015	Spicy Chocolate, SKY-HI	Shibuya Junai Monogatari 2
"poppin'"	2018	Aoyama Thelma	Highschool Gal
"NAO"	2018	—N/a	Chanpuru Story: HY Tribute
"Sunshine"	2018	Miyavi	Samural Sessions Vol.3: Worlds Collide

== See also ==
- Shota Shimizu
