= Forever Love (Miliyah Kato and Shota Shimizu song) =

- Standard edition cover

Single by Miliyah Kato and Shota Shimizu

from the album Journey
- B-side: "Jewelry"
- Released: February 3, 2010
- Genre: J-pop
- Length: 5:50
- Label: Mastersix Foundation
- Songwriters: Miliyah Kato; Shota Shimizu
- Producer: 3rd Productions

Miliyah Kato singles chronology
"Why" (2009)	"Forever Love" (2010)	"Bye Bye" (2010)

Shota Shimizu singles chronology
"Kimi ga Suki" (2009)	"Forever Love" (2010)	"Goodbye" (2010)

Music video
- "Forever Love" on YouTube

"Forever Love" is a song by Japanese singer-songwriters Miliyah Kato and Shota Shimizu, from Shimizu's second studio album Journey (2010) and their first collaborative album, The Best (2014). The song was written by Kato and Shimizu, while the production handled by Japanese production team, 3rd Productions. The single was released for the two versions of CD and digital download on 3 February 2010 through Mastersix Foundation as the third single from Journey. Ahead of the release, the short version of the song was released on 12 December 2009 as a ringtone.

"Forever Love" is a dance-pop track with a dance beat. The song was written as the answer song to the duo's previous collaboration, "Love Forever" (2009). The single reached number 3 on the Billboard Japan Hot 100 and peaked at number 4 on the Oricon Weekly Singles Chart. "Forever Love" has been certified double platinum for its digital sales sold and triple platinum for its ringtone sales. Kato and Shimizu has promoted the song with several televised live performances such as Music Station.

== Commercial performance ==
In Japan, "Forever Love" debuted at number 61 on the Billboard Japan Hot 100 dated 18 January 2010. It peaked at number three in its fifth peak. In June 2010, "Forever Love" was certified double platinum by the Recording Industry Association of Japan with more than 500,000 units downloaded. The song was also given a triple platinum certification for more than 750,000 ringtones downloaded. On the Oricon Weekly Singles Chart, the single debuted at number four with the sales of 30,685 copies. It stayed on the chart for 12 consecutive weeks, selling 60,101 in total.

== Track listing ==
CD single/digital download
No.	Title	Writer(s)	Arranger(s)	Length
1.	"Forever Love"	Miliyah Kato; Shota Shimizu	3rd Productions	5:50
2.	"Jewelry"	Kato; Shimizu	Manaboon	4:59
3.	"Love Forever" (Happy Wedding Remix)	Kato; Shimizu	3rd Productions	5:37
4.	"Forever Love" (Instrumental)	Kato; Shimizu	3rd Productions	5:48
Total length:				22:14

Limited edition bonus DVD
No.	Title	Writer(s)	Director(s)	Length
1.	"Forever Love" (Music video)	Miliyah Kato; Shota Shimizu	Shigeaki Kubo

== Charts ==
=== Weekly charts ===
Chart (2010)	Peak position
Japan (Hot 100)	3
Japan CD (Oricon)	4
Japan Download (RIAJ)	1
Japan Adult Contemporary (Billboard)	5

=== Year-end charts ===
Chart (2010)	Peak position
Japan Sales (Billboard Japan)	99
Japan Radio (Billboard Japan)	65
Japan Download (RIAJ)	9

== Certification and sales ==
Region	Certification	Certified units/sales
Japan Digital (RIAJ)	2×Platinum	500,00
Japan Ringtones (RIAJ)	3×Platinum	750,00
Japan CD (RIAJ)	None	60,101

== Release history ==
Region	Date	Format	Catalogue Num.	Label	Ref.
Japan	12 December 2009	Ringtone		Mastersix Foundation	
Japan	3 February 2010	CD	SRCL-7209	Mastersix Foundation	
Japan	3 February 2010	CD+DVD	SRCL-7207/8	Mastersix Foundation	
Japan	3 February 2010	Digital download		Mastersix Foundation	
