= Yūsha Tachi =

- Standard edition cover

Single by Miliyah Kato

from the album M Best
- B-side: "Sign" "Wara no Inu"
- Released: March 16, 2011
- Genre: J-pop; R&B
- Length: 6:17
- Label: Mastersix Foundation
- Songwriter(s): Miliyah Kato
- Producer(s): Yuichiro Goto

Miliyah Kato singles chronology
"Stronger" (2010)	"Yūsha Tachi" (2011)	"Desire" / "Baby! Baby! Baby!" (2011)

Music video
- "Yūsha Tachi" on YouTube

"Yūsha Tachi" (勇者たち; lit. "Heroes") is a song by Japanese singer-songwriter Miliyah Kato from her second compilation album M Best (2011) and her sixth studio album True Lovers (2012). The song was written by Kato herself, while the production was done by Kato's frequent collaborator, Yuichiro Goto. The single was released for the two versions of CD and digital download on 16 March 2011 through Mastersix Foundation as the lead single from M Best. Ahead of its official release, the short version of the song was released on 2 March 2011 as a ringtone.

"Yūsha Tachi" is a middle-tempo J-pop track with the elements of R&B. The single peaked at number 13 on the Billboard Japan Hot 100 and reached number eight on the Oricon Weekly Singles Chart. "Yūsha Tachi" has been certified gold by the Recording Industry Association of Japan with more than 100,000 units downloaded. The song served as the theme songs to the Japanese television shows, Happy Music and Dance@TV. Kato provided the first televised performance on Bokura no Ongaku on 29 July 2011, for the promotion of the song was put into a halt due to the impact of the 2011 Tōhoku earthquake and tsunami. The accompanying music video was directed by Tomoo Noda and included on the DVD accompanying with the limited edition of the single. In June 2012, the video won the 2012 MTV Video Music Awards Japan for the Best R&B Video. The song has also received several official remixes.

== Commercial performance ==
In Japan, "Yūsha Tachi" debuted at its peak, number 13 on the Billboard Japan Hot 100 dated 23 March 2011. On the Oricon Weekly Singles Chart, the single debuted at number eight with the sales of 6,178 copies. It stayed on the chart for six weeks, selling over 11,000 copies in total. "Yūsha Tachi" scored a moderate success on the adult contemporary radio, peaking at number 21 on the Billboard Japan Adult Contemporary Airplay chart. In June 2012, "Yūsha Tachi" was certified gold by the Recording Industry Association of Japan with more than 100,000 units downloaded.

== Other versions ==
=== Remixes ===
Two remixes of "Yūsha Tachi" have been officially released as of January 2021. The first remix was by T.O.M., and released on 6 June 2012 as the B-side track of Kato's single "Aiaiai". A remix by Manaboon, known as Sleepless Night Manaboon Remix, was released as the B-side track of Kato's single "Honto no Boku wo Shitte" on 4 September 2019.

=== Cover version ===
"Yūsha Tachi" was covered by Japanese-American singer Ai for Kato's tribute album, Inspire (2020). Ai is Kato's fellow musician and has collaborated with the singer for their single, "Stronger" (2011). The album peaked at number 40 on the Billboard Japan Hot Albums chart as well as reaching number 43 on the Oricon Weekly Albums chart.

== Track listing ==
CD single/digital download
No.	Title	Writer(s)	Arranger(s)	Length
1.	"Yūsha Tachi"	Miliyah Kato	Yuichiro Goto	6:17
2.	"Sign"	Kato		4:54
3.	"Wara no Inu"	Sohshiroh Mizumasa		4:53
4.	"Yūsha Tachi" (Instrumental)	Kato	Goto	15:00:00
Total length:				22:19

Limited edition bonus DVD
No.	Title	Writer(s)	Length
1.	"Bye Bye" (Live from "Beat Connection")	Miliyah Kato
2.	"Why" (Live from "Beat Connection")	Miliyah Kato
3.	"I Miss You" (Live from "Beat Connection")	Miliyah Kato

== Charts ==
=== Weekly charts ===
Chart (2011)	Peak position
Japan (Hot 100)	13
Japan CD (Oricon)	8
Japan Download (RIAJ)	7
Japan Adult Contemporary (Billboard Japan)	21

=== Year-end charts ===
Chart (2011)	Peak position
Japan Usen Airplay (Usen)	29

== Certification and sales ==
Region	Certification	Certified units/sales
Japan (RIAJ)	Gold	100,000 (Download)
Japan (RIAJ)	None	7,009 (CD)

== Release history ==
Region	Date	Format	Catalogue Num.	Label	Ref.
Japan	2 March 2011	Ringtone		Mastersix Foundation	
Japan	16 March 2011	Digital download		Mastersix Foundation	
Japan	16 March 2011	CD	SRCL-7582	Mastersix Foundation	
Japan	16 March 2011	CD+DVD	SRCL-7580/1	Mastersix Foundation	
