= Dear Lonely Girl =

Single by Miliyah Kato

from the album Rose
- Released: March 24, 2005
- Genre: Pop; R&B
- Length: 3:29
- Label: Mastersix Foundation
- Songwriter(s): Marvin Gaye; Odell Brown; David Ritz; Takashi Matsumoto; Kyohei Tsutsumi; Miliyah Kato
- Producer(s): Shingo.S

Miliyah Kato singles chronology
"Beautiful" (2004)	"Dear Lonely Girl" (2005)	"Jōnetsu" (2005)

"Dear Lonely Girl" (ディア ロンリーガール, Dia Ronrī Gāru) is a song recorded by Japanese singer-songwriter Miliyah Kato for her debut album Rose. It was released as the album's third single on March 24, 2005. "Dear Lonely Girl" is considered an answer song to ECD's "ECD no Lonely Girl", from which it samples its structure. Both songs sample the melody of Marvin Gaye's "Sexual Healing" and the hook of idol singer Yuri Satō's "Lonely Girl" (1983), which became the chorus of Kato's song.

The hook of Kato's "Dear Lonely Girl" involves her shouting out various feminine given names. These names are lifted from both Kato's real life, including the names of members of her entourage, and from fiction, namely character names from the premier cell phone novel series Deep Love.

Kato's song "Lipstick" (2015) was written from the perspective of the same protagonist, but ten years later. In 2017, Kato released the song "Shinyaku Dear Lonely Girl" (新約ディアロンリーガール, "Dear Lonely Girl: New Testament") featuring ECD, in which she samples "Dear Lonely Girl".

== Track listing ==
=== CD single ===
No.	Title	Writer(s)	Producer(s)	Length
1.	"Dear Lonely Girl" (ディア ロンリーガール Dia Ronrī Gāru)	Marvin Gaye; Odell Brown; David Ritz; Takashi Matsumoto; Kyohei Tsutsumi; Miliyah Kato	Shingo.S	3:29
2.	"Dreaming Under the Moon"	Kato	Maestro-T	4:59
3.	"Ooh...Baby"	Kato	Shingo.S	3:34
4.	"Dear Lonely Girl" (Instrumental)	Gaye; Brown; Ritz; Matsumoto; Tsutsumi; Kato	Shingo.S	3:28
Total length:				15:28

== Charts ==
Chart (2005)	Peak position	Sales
Japan Weekly Singles (Oricon)	15	50,000
