= Stronger (Ai song) =

- Standard cover

Single by Ai featuring Miliyah Kato

from the album The Last Ai
- B-side: "Let It Go"
- Released: October 27, 2010
- Genre: J-pop; R&B
- Length: 5:03
- Label: Island
- Songwriters: Ai Uemura; Miliyah Kato; T. Kura
- Producer: T. Kura

Ai singles chronology
| "Nemurenai Machi" (2010) | "Stronger" (2010) | "Letter in the Sky" / "Happiness" (2011) |

Miliyah Kato singles chronology
| "Last Love" (2010) | "Stronger" (2010) | "Yūsha Tachi" (2011) |

Music video
- "Stronger" on YouTube

"Stronger" (stylized in caps) is a song by Japanese-American singer-songwriter Ai featuring Japanese singer Miliyah Kato. The song was released on October 27, 2010, by Island Records and Universal Sigma, serving as the fourth and final single for Ai's eighth studio album, The Last Ai.

== Composition and inspiration ==
As a part of Ai's 10th anniversary, she had been collaborating with many artists, such as "Fake" featuring Namie Amuro, "Still..." feat. AK-69 and "Wavin' Flag (Coca Cola Celebration Mix) (Sekai ni Hitotsu no Hata)" with K'naan. When the collaboration single offer was presented to Miliyah Kato, who is good friends with Ai, her reaction was "Finally! I feel so honoured. It's like a dream I've been imagining has become real." The song was written by Ai and Kato together, with both deciding such things as the lyrics, music, and which parts to sing.

The song is a contemporary R&B dance pop song. The lyrics are a message song, instructing the listener to survive through "any kind of future," and talks about the limits of a person. In news articles, the song is described as being about "The strength to keep going forward, even when hurt."

== Promotion ==
The song was performed twice at promotional events. At the Levi's Jeans Shape What's to Come event at Ebisu, Shibuya on October 26, Ai performed the song with Kato appearing as an unannounced guest for the event. Ai performed the song solo at a secret live event for fashion magazine Glamorous, 2010 Glamorous Night Evolution on November 2.

The song was performed at Music Station on October 29, alongside Kato. Ai appeared on an episode of King's Brunch on October 30. Two MTV Japan shows aired to promote the single: a Making the Video episode for the song's music video, aired on October 31, and a show called MTV A Class AI on November 20.

To promote the single, Ai featured in magazines such as Blenda, Glamorous, Hanachu, Nikkei Entertainment, Ori Star, Ranzuki, S-Cawaii and Woofin'.

== Music video ==
The music video was directed by Tatsuaki, and produced by Yahman. It is Ai's first video to feature CGI graphics. The video features Ai and Kato in a white room, as black rings form and tear apart around them. The rings are meant to represent beats of people's heartbeats.

The music video debuted on MTV Japan on October 27, 2010.

== Track listing ==
"Stronger" track listing
| No. | Title | Writer(s) | Producer(s) | Length |
|---|---|---|---|---|
| 1. | "Stronger" (featuring Miliyah Kato) | Uemura; Miho Katō; T. Kura | T. Kura | 5:03 |
| 2. | "Let It Go" (featuring Snoop Dogg) | Uemura; Cordell Broadus; DJ2High; Uta; Tynice Hinton | DJ 2 High; Uta | 3:37 |
| 3. | "Stronger" (featuring Milyah Kato) (Instrumental) | | | 5:03 |
| 4. | "Let It Go" (featuring Snoop Dogg) (Instrumental) | | | 3:36 |
| Total length: | | | | 17:19 |

"Stronger" – Limited edition
| No. | Title | Director | Length |
|---|---|---|---|
| 1. | "Stronger" (featuring Miliyah Kato) (music video) | Tatsuaki | 5:13 |

== Charts ==
| Chart | Peak position |
|---|---|
| Adult Contemporary Radio (Billboard Japan) | 42 |
| RIAJ Digital Track Chart Top 100 | 4 |
| Japan Hot 100 (Billboard Japan) | 30 |
| Japan Singles Chart (Oricon) | 26 |

== Reported sales ==
| Chart | Amount |
|---|---|
| Oricon physical sales | 7,000 |

== Release history ==
| Region | Date | Format |
|---|---|---|
| Japan | October 13, 2010 | Ringtone |
| Japan | October 27, 2010 | CD single, CD+DVD single, digital download, rental CD |
