= Eyes on You (Miliyah Kato song) =

Single by Miliyah Kato

from the album Diamond Princess
- B-side: "Kono Mama Zutto Asa Made" "Trouble"
- Released: February 7, 2007
- Genre: J-pop; R&B; dance-pop
- Length: 4:56
- Label: Mastersix Foundation
- Songwriter(s): Miliyah Kato
- Producer(s): Yanagiman; Tetsuya Ochiai

Miliyah Kato singles chronology
"I Will" (2006)	"Eyes on You" (2007)	"My Girl" (2007)

"Eyes on You" (stylized as "Eyes on you") is a song by Japanese singer-songwriter Miliyah Kato from her second studio album Diamond Princess (2007). The song was written by Kato herself, while the production was done by Yanagiman. The single was released for CD and digital download on 7 February 2007 through Mastersix Foundation as the fourth single from Diamond Princess.

"Eyes on You" is an up-tempo J-pop track with the elements of R&B and disco music. The single peaked at number 13 on the Oricon Weekly Singles Chart and has been certified gold by the Recording Industry Association of Japan with more than 100,000 units downloaded.

The song served as the theme song to the Japanese science fiction comedy film Bubble Fiction: Boom or Bust (2007) and the commercial song to the music download store Iro Melo Dx. The single's B-side track, "Kono Mama Zutto Asa Made" is a hip-hop track which incorporates the Tanto Metro and Devonte song "Everyone Falls in Love" (1997). The song was later released as the promotional single for the two versions of 12-inch single in January and July 2007, and has been certified gold with 100,000 digital units sold.

== Commercial performance ==
In Japan, "Eyes on You" debuted at its peak, number 13 on Oricon Weekly Singles Chart, with the sales of 9,887 copies. It stayed on the chart for six weeks, selling 25,246 copies in total.

== Track listing ==
CD single/digital download
No.	Title	Writer(s)	Arranger(s)	Length
1.	"Eyes on You"	Miliyah Kato	Yanagiman	4:56
2.	"Kono Mama Zutto Asa Made"	Kato; Anthony Kelly; Mark Wolfe; Steven Marsden; Wayne Passley		4:04
3.	"Trouble"	Kato	3rd Productions	4:01
Total length:				13:01

== Charts ==
Chart (2007)	Peak position
Japan (Oricon)	13

== Certification and sales ==
Region	Certification	Certified units/sales
Japan (RIAJ)	None	25,246 (CD)
Japan (RIAJ)	Gold	100,000 (Digital download)

== Release history ==
Region	Date	Format	Catalogue Num.	Label	Ref.
Japan	17 November 2004	Digital download		Mastersix Foundation	
Japan	17 November 2004	CD	SRCL-6478	Mastersix Foundation	
