= Heart Beat (Miliyah Kato song) =

- Standard edition cover

Single by Miliyah Kato

from the album True Lovers
- B-side: "Rakuen"
- Released: August 8, 2012
- Genre: J-pop
- Length: 5:43
- Label: Mastersix Foundation
- Songwriter(s): Miliyah Kato; Manaboon
- Producer(s): Manaboon; Taku Takahashi; Mitsunori Ikeda; Miliyah Kato

Miliyah Kato singles chronology
"Aiaiai" (2012)	"Heart Beat" (2012)	"Lovers Part II" (2012)

"Heart Beat" is a song by Japanese singer-songwriter Miliyah Kato from her sixth studio album, True Lovers (2012). The song was written by Kato and Manaboon, with the two handling production alongside Taku Takahashi and Mitsunori Ikeda. The song served as Coca-Cola's Japanese campaign song for the 2012 Summer Olympics and aired on the television commercials ahead of its official release. The single was released for the two versions of CD and digital download on 8 August 2012 through Mastersix Foundation as the fourth single from True Lovers, and the English version of the song was released for digital download on 14 November 2012. Ahead of the release, the short version of the song was released on 27 June 2012 as a ringtone.

"Heart Beat" is a dance-pop track with a dance beat that incorporates the numerous sound effects recorded with sports players such as Satsuki Ito, Japanese boxer. The single entered at number 8 on the Billboard Japan Hot 100 and peaked at number 14 on the Oricon Weekly Singles Chart. It became Kato's first top 10 single in more than two years, since "Bye Bye" (2010). "Heart Beat" has been certified platinum by the Recording Industry Association of Japan with more than 250,000 units downloaded.

The accompanying music video was directed by Moocho and premiered on 25 July 2012 on YouTube. It portrays Kato in many locations, including the recording studio, music venue, and the sports ground. Kato has promoted the song with televised live performances on Music Station and Music Lovers. Kato also performed at KOKO in London, the United Kingdom, as a special guest for the dance competition sponsored by Coca-Cola, "My Beat Contest". The single's B-side track, "Rakuen" (楽園, Paradise) was used as the theme song to the 2012 Japanese film Another. The dub-step song incorporates key lines from the film in its lyrics.

== Commercial performance ==
In Japan, "Heart Beat" debuted at number 44 on the Billboard Japan Hot 100 dated 6 August 2012. It climbed to number 13 the following week, peaking at number eight in its third week on the chart. In January 2014, "Heart Beat" was certified platinum by the Recording Industry Association of Japan with more than 250,000 units downloaded. On the Oricon Weekly Singles Chart, the single debuted at number 14 with the sales of 15,286 copies. It stayed on the chart for six consecutive weeks, selling 25,912 in total.

== Live performances ==
Kato performed "Heart Beat" at the Coca-Cola London Challenge Kinki in Osaka, Japan on 22 April 2012. On 30 July 2012, Kato gave her first overseas performance at KOKO in London as a special guest for the dance competition sponsored by Coca-Cola, "My Beat Contest". Kato performed the English version of "Heart Beat" as well as the English versions of her songs, "Aitai" and "Koi Shiteru".

Kato has also promoted "Heart Beat" with multiple television performances. On 10 August 2012, Kato sang the song on Music Station only two days after the release. Kato performed the song on the Best Hits Kayosai 2012 on 22 November 2012. On 28 October 2012, Kato performed "Heart Beat" on Music Lovers, where the singer talked with another guest Naomi Watanabe. Later, "Heart Beat" was included on the setlists of Kato's "True Lovers Tour 2013", on which she embarked from February 2013.

== Other versions ==
=== English version ===
English-language version of "Heart Beat" was released for digital download on 14 November 2012, three months after the original version's release. The version was first performed at KOKO in London, the United Kingdom on 30 July 2012 as a special guest for the dance competition sponsored by Coca-Cola, "My Beat Contest".

=== Remixes ===
"Heart Beat" has received three official remixes as of January 2021. The two remixes by the song's producer Manaboon and Japanese electronic music duo Dexpistols were included on the single, the latter also being included on Kato's fourth compilation album, Muse (2014). Another remix, titled "Heart Beat (Samba O Rei Remix)" was initially made available for the purchase of the essential oil products with the collaboration with Kao in October 2016, and later included on her single "Dokomademo: How Far I'll Go" (2017).

=== Cover version ===
"Heart Beat" was covered by Japanese virtual YouTuber, Ai Kizuna for Kato's tribute album, Inspire (2020). The album peaked at number 40 on the Billboard Japan Hot Albums chart as well as reaching number 43 on the Oricon Weekly Albums chart.

== Track listing ==
CD single/digital download
No.	Title	Writer(s)	Arranger(s)	Length
1.	"Heart Beat"	Miliyah Kato; Manaboon	Manaboon; Taku Takahashi; Mitsunori Ikeda; Kato	5:43
2.	"Rakuen" (楽園)	Kato		3:57
3.	"Heart Beat" (Dexpistols Remix)	Kato; Manaboon	Dexpistols	4:21
4.	"Heart Beat" (Manaboon Boogie Remix)	Kato; Manaboon	Manaboon	5:07
Total length:				19:08

Limited edition bonus DVD
No.	Title	Writer(s)	Arranger(s)	Length
1.	"Heart Beat" (music video)	Miliyah Kato; Manaboon	Manaboon
2.	"Heart Beat Teaser Chapter 01" (Athletes)
3.	"Heart Beat Teaser Chapter 02" (Streets)
4.	"Heart Beat Teaser Chapter 03" (Party)

Digital download (English version)
No.	Title	Writer(s)	Arranger(s)	Length
1.	"Heart Beat" (English version)	Miliyah Kato; Manaboon	Manaboon	5:41

== Charts ==
=== Weekly charts ===
Chart (2012)	Peak position
Japan (Hot 100)	8
Japan CD (Oricon)	14
Japan Download (RIAJ)	1

== Certification and sales ==
Region	Certification	Certified units/sales
Japan (RIAJ)	Platinum	250,000 (Download)
Japan (RIAJ)	None	25,912 (CD)

== Release history ==
Region	Date	Format	Catalogue Num.	Label	Ref.
Japan	27 June 2012	Ringtone		Mastersix Foundation	
Japan	8 August 2012	CD	SRCL-8050	Mastersix Foundation	
Japan	8 August 2012	CD+DVD	SRCL-8048/9	Mastersix Foundation	
Japan	8 August 2012	Digital download		Mastersix Foundation	
Japan	14 November 2012	Digital download (English version)		Mastersix Foundation	
