= Lonely Hearts (Miliyah Kato song) =

- Standard edition cover

Single by Miliyah Kato

from the album Loveland
- B-side: "Only U"
- Released: October 2, 2013
- Genre: J-pop; R&B
- Length: 4:56
- Label: Mastersix Foundation
- Songwriter(s): Miliyah Kato
- Producer(s): Miliyah Kato

Miliyah Kato singles chronology
"Emotion" (2013)	"Lonely Hearts" (2013)	"Love/Affection" / "Kamisama" (2014)

Music video
- "Lonely Hearts" on YouTube

"Lonely Hearts" is a song by Japanese singer-songwriter Miliyah Kato from her seventh studio album, Loveland (2014). The song was written and produced by Kato herself. The single was released for the two versions of CD and digital download on 2 October 2013 through Mastersix Foundation as the second single from Loveland. Ahead of its official release, the short version of the song was released on 18 September 2013 as a ringtone, and the title song was released for digital download on 25 September 2013.

"Lonely Hearts" is a middle-tempo J-pop track with the elements of dance-pop and R&B, and was written as the sequence of Kato's 2005 single, "Dear Lonely Girl". The single peaked at number 13 on the Billboard Japan Hot 100 and reached number 17 on the Oricon Weekly Singles Chart. "Lonely Hearts" has been certified gold by the Recording Industry Association of Japan with more than 100,000 units downloaded. The song became Kato's highest-ranking solo single since "Heart Beat" (2012).

The accompanying music video was directed by Takeshi Maruyama and premiered on 20 September 2013 on YouTube. It deals with same-sex relationship, friendship, bullying, and drug abuse as its theme. Kato has promoted the song with televised live performances on Music Fair on 12 October 2013. The song has also received several remixes.

== Commercial performance ==
In Japan, "Lonely Hearts" debuted at number 29 on the Billboard Japan Hot 100 dated 7 October 2013. It peaked at number 14 the following week. In February 2020, "Lonely Hearts" was certified gold by the Recording Industry Association of Japan with more than 100,000 units downloaded. On the Oricon Weekly Singles Chart, the single debuted at number 17 with the sales of 4,725 copies. It stayed on the chart for five non-consecutive weeks, selling 7,009 copies in total.

== Other versions ==
=== Remixes ===
Three remixes of "Lonely Hearts" have been officially released as of January 2021. The first remix was by T.O.M., and released on 3 September 2014 as the B-side track of Kato's single "You...". A remix by DJ Shuya, known as M-Mix version, was released as a part of Kato's first remix album, Kato Miliyah M-Mix: Mastermix Vol.1 on 29 July 2015. The third remix by the Sknow was released on 4 September 2019 as the B-side track of Kato's single, "Honto no Boku wo Shitte".

=== Cover version ===
"Lonely Hearts" was covered by Japanese singer Harucha for Kato's tribute album, Inspire (2020). The album peaked at number 40 on the Billboard Japan Hot Albums chart as well as reaching number 43 on the Oricon Weekly Albums chart.

== Track listing ==
CD single/digital download
No.	Title	Writer(s)	Arranger(s)	Length
1.	"Lonely Hearts"	Miliyah Kato	Kato	4:56
2.	"Only U"	Kato	Kato	3:51
3.	"Aitai" (Loneliness Remix)	Kato		5:04
4.	"Lonely Hearts" (Instrumental)	Kato	Kato	4:55
Total length:				18:46

Limited edition bonus DVD
No.	Title	Writer(s)	Director(s)	Length
1.	"Lonely Hearts" (Music video)	Miliyah Kato	Takeshi Maruyama

== Charts ==
=== Weekly charts ===
Chart (2013)	Peak position
Japan (Hot 100)	17
Japan CD (Oricon)	13

== Certification and sales ==
Region	Certification	Certified units/sales
Japan (RIAJ)	Gold	100,000 (Download)
Japan (RIAJ)	None	7,009 (CD)

== Release history ==
Region	Date	Format	Catalogue Num.	Label	Ref.
Japan	18 September 2013	Ringtone		Mastersix Foundation	
Japan	25 September 2013	Digital download (Single)		Mastersix Foundation	
Japan	2 October 2013	CD	SRCL-8361	Mastersix Foundation	
Japan	2 October 2013	CD+DVD	SRCL-8350/60	Mastersix Foundation	
Japan	2 October 2013	Digital download (EP)		Mastersix Foundation	
