= Yanagiman =

Japanese musician and record producer (born 1960)

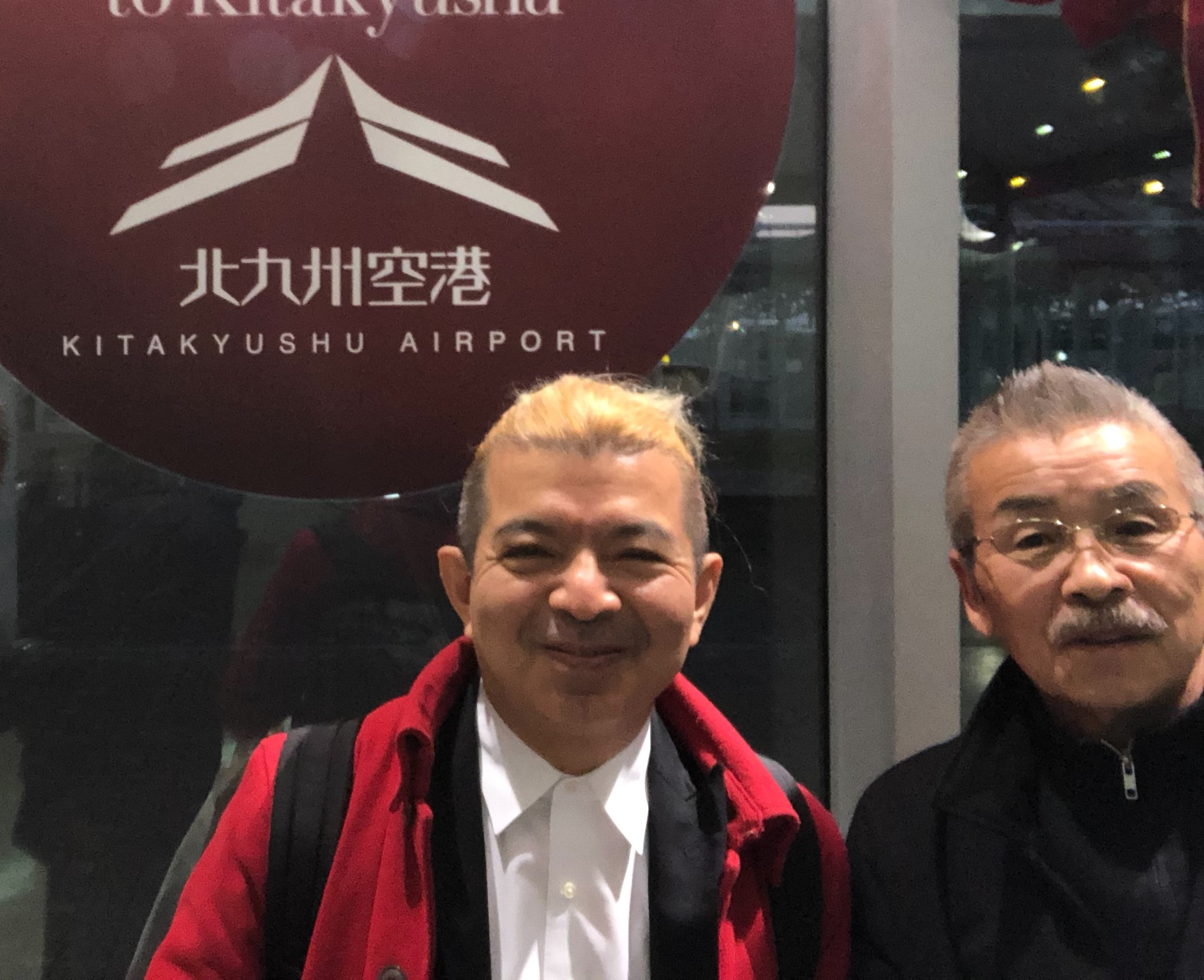
- YANAGIMAN is on the left and Masami Sudda is on the right. (At the Kitakyushu Airport, 2017）

Background information
- Born: Yukiyasu Yanagi; November 9, 1960 (age 65); Amami Ōshima, Japan
- Origin: Kagoshima, Kagoshima, Japan
- Genres: Japanese pop, Jazz, Rock, Funk, Japanese folk, R&B, Hip-hop
- Occupations: Musician; composer; songwriter; arranger; record producer
- Instruments: Bass; Contrabass; Keyboards; Ukulele
- Years active: 1997–present
- Spouse: 1989
- Website: yanagiman.com

Yukiyasu Yanagi (born 9 November 1960), better known by his stage name YANAGIMAN is a Japanese musician, composer, songwriter, arranger and record producer from Kagoshima. He composed, wrote, arranged and produced music for various famous artists including Ketsumeishi, Funky Monkey Babys, Miriya Katou, Elephant Kashimashi and Usher, who is an American popular singer-songwriter. He leads the music band "1933 Ukulele All Stars" and is the bandmaster. He is a visiting professor at the Senzoku Gakuen College of Music and an adviser to the Matsumi High School since 2022. His blood type is B and lives in Tokyo since 1995.

== Early life and career ==
Yanagiman was born in Amami Ōshima island, Kagoshima Prefecture. He finished mandatory schools and high school in Kagoshima Prefecture and enrolled at Kumamoto University School of Pharmacy.

From early childhood he was involved with music. He was most influenced with Simon & Garfunkel and during his university days he was fascinated by Earth, Wind and Fire. As a result, he started his work as a jazz musician in Tokyo, 1982 and worked to improve his skills through many jazz sessions. He was playing as a contrabass player at the jazz club "Shinjuku Pit Inn". At the same year he dropped out of Kumamoto University during senior year.

In 1989, he moved to the United States with his wife and enrolled at Berklee College of Music in Boston, Massachusetts, USA. He was as a scholarship exemption student at that time. He held some sessions with a schoolmate, jazz pianist, Hiroshi Minami there.

=== Career track ===
When he returned from United States in 1992, he lived in Fukuoka, Japan and worked as a reporter on television. He acted with Date of birth, a Japanese music band, and took part in their concert tour and played and recorded their songs.

In 1995, at the age of 35, he moved his base for musical activities to Tokyo after winning the contest "the Sound & Recording Magazine" sponsored. In 1997 he won the AXIA Tape Contest Grand-Prix for "Funky Face" co-written with Yōichi Hama.

A chance given by the artist expanded his range of work, he participated in the production of a Southern All Stars's album by Kazuyuki Sekiguchi. Moreover, he began producing and arranging work for Soul Lovers. After that he got acquainted with Ketsumeishi through Mahya from Soul Lovers, and started to create its music works.

His original specialty is standard pop music. He kept on learning to explore new genres of reggae and hip-hop, which led to hit tunes with Ketsumeishi's hip-hop lyrics.

He produced music for various artists, for instance, Ketsumeishi, Funky Monkey Babys, Chemistry, Crystal Kay, Kumi Koda, Mika Nakashima, Miliyah Kato, Elephant Kashimashi, BoA, Def Tech and Ayaka Hirahara, in Japan. He also remixed for Usher, who is active in the Billboard scene and produced music to overseas artists such as Hong Kong singers Ivan Wang(王友良), HotCha, and Ella Koon(官恩娜).

In 2000, Kiyoshi Matsuo, a music producer from the same in Kyushu, asked him if made a song for the ASAYAN audition. After that, he got acquainted with Chemistry and produced their first album track "Aishisugite (Love too hard)".

In 2005, Ketsumeishi's "Ketsunopolis 4" was sold 2 million copies and won the Japan Record Award for the Best Album of the year.

By 2013, the cumulative number of shipped copies of his related works has reached more than 20 million.

=== With his musician friends ===
In 2018, Yanagiman's Ukulele friend, Kazuyuki Sekiguchi from the Southern All Stars, formed "1933 Ukulele All Stars", so he served as its bandmaster. It comprised even Japanese musicians including Sekiguchi, Boo Takagi, Yoshio Nomura, Kimiko Wakiyama, You Hatakeyama and Yoko Oginome.

After that, eager to donate to an orphanage in Cambodia, Yanagiman wrote a new song for Hitomi Shimatani, who agreed with his purpose. On May 3, 2019, she sang and performed the song "Cycle" at Pacifico Yokohama with over 20,000 people.

Taking the situation of COVID-19 pandemics in May 2020, Yanagiman appeared on television, the NHK BS1 special program "On the night of refraining from going outside - A relay concert with ukulele". He played the ukulele and contrabass on broadcast from his home, because the introducing baton was passed to him by Kazuyuki Sekiguchi of the Southern All Stars. And after Yanagiman, the baton was passed to Boo Takagi of the Drifters and to the following Yoko Oginome.

In July 2021, he wrote a music tune in "Japanese reggae" and gave to the special unit group that Hitomi Shimatani and Minmi collaborated for the first time.

In April 2022, he was appointed as a visiting professor at Senzoku Gakuen College of Music.

== Achievements ==
With Ketsumeishi

"Ketsunopolis 4" (2005) won the Japan Record Award for the Best Album.

With BoA

"LOVE LETTER" (2007) won the Japan Record Award Gold Prize.

With Funkey Monkey Babys

"Soredemo Shinjiteru(I still believe)" (2011) won the Japan Record Award for the Excellent Work Award.

Appointed as

- Sansan Numazu Taishi - the 23rd and 24th (Spokesperson of Numazu City, Shizuoka Prefecture)
- Nagahama Brand Ambassador (Spokesperson of Nagahama City, Shiga Prefecture)
- Amami Tourism Ambassador (Spokesperson of Amami Oshima, Kagoshima Prefecture) and a
- JOIN ambassador (Spokesperson for Japan Organization for Internal Migration(JOIN)).
- Visiting professor at Senzoku Gakuen College of Music (1 April, 2022 -)
- Adviser to Matsumi High School (2022 -)

=== Discography ===
As YANAGIMAN (As band player)

- "Hou Sen Rai Koh (Treasure Ship Arrival)"
- "Papa no Te (Dad's hand)" (Vocal: Boo Takagi)
- "Koi no Daisan Keihin (Daisan Keihin in Love)"
- "Sora no Shita, Hoshi no Ue (Under the Sky, Above the Stars)" (Vocal: Yoko Oginome)
- "LOVE AFFAIR ~ Himitsu no Date"
- "<June> Kanashiki Amaoto (Rhythm Of The Rain In June)"
- "BITTER SWEET SAMBA"
- "LOVE"
- "Namida no Kiss (Kiss By Tears)"
- "HOTEL PACIFIC"
- "Umi he Ikou ~ ukulele picnic ~(Let's go to the sea)"
- "CAN'T BUY ME LOVE"
- "THERE MUST BE AN ANGEL (PLAYING WITH MY HEART)"
- "Shiawase no Kiiroi Ribbon (Yellow Ribbon of Happiness)"
- "TAHITI" (Vocal MONGOL800 Kiyosaku)

== Artistry ==
Yanagiman's music style is generally pop, while he also incorporates Japanese folk music and hip hop occasionally. He has credited Simon & Garfunkel as a big influence.

He says that his birthplace Amami Ōshima and Ishigaki Island, where his mother's family home is located, are the origins of his musicality.

His father was a police officer and also served as the chief of Yakushima Police Station in Kagoshima Prefecture. He had a strict personality and was also a 2nd dan in judo and 2nd dan in kendo. If Yanagiman did anything wrong, he was scolded with an iron fist. His rebellion against his father and his desire to be loved by his father affected his musicality.

Both his parents were Sanshin teachers. He was always involved with familiar music such as dancing to the Kachāshī music. He has been influenced by Okinawan music such as Shoukichi Kina's "Haisai Ojisan" and "Hana (Flowers: Flowers for everyone's hearts)".

At the age of 8, he was astonished by the messaging of Morinaga & Co.'s TV commercial "Bigger is better!!", and he admired it. This unforgettable impact turned into his worldview and by that he was trying to keep in mind as usual, "Music connects people. People connect music.".

When he was 10 years old, he set the beginning to produce music, for example by buying a Simon & Garfunkel record at the first time. And when he was in the 4th grade of elementary school, he made overdubbing with two cassette recorders that he bought with New Year's gift money. When he entered junior high school, he started playing the acoustic guitar and bass, and to imitate Yōsui Inoue songs.

When Yanagiman was a university student, music with intense rhythm was popular, and he became fond of disco music [disambiguation required] and black music such as jazz, during his university.

His like for computers made him an early adopter of digital recording. He said in an interview that speed of the transition to digital was a factor in creating his hits. Especially from the latter half of the 1990s, CDJs (digital playing equipment for DJs) that can be played with scratch became popular.

From the same time, the era has changed music, that two people carried a large and heavy instrument such as an organ into that light polyphonic synthesizers became mainstream, making it easier to play. He says that being able to record easily was a turning point in his music production.

From around 1998, the boom by Hikaru Utada changed the Japanese music scene from 8-beat band music to digital music.

As 16-beat music increased and 4-on-the-floor dance music came out more and more, Yanagiman was able to get on the R&B trend, the black music that he liked.

The first artist he met in Tokyo after moving there, was Kazuyuki Sekiguchi of the Southern All Stars. He learned their "non-genre and playful entertainment" from Sekiguchi. He says he felt the same in Ketsumeishi. They were conscious of music in which "erotic fun" and "beauty" were all mixed together.

When asked about the best 10 songs that inspired his production activities, he picked up "Earth, Wind & Fire," "The Greatest Showman," and "Pirates of the Caribbean." And as an extra, he would give the sound effect collection and natural sound. He said that they used to put in intros and memorable parts of Japanese old classics.

== Relationships ==
=== Personal life and family ===
In 1988, he met a woman who was a senior at Kumamoto University and was an officer, and he got married with her in 1989. She also moved to the United States with him in 1989, when he enrolled at Berklee College of Music. His son was born in 1994.

He likes dogs and has two miniature dachshunds. He can play the bass, guitar, piano, and ukulele willingly.

=== Friendships ===
- Boo Takagi (The Drifters) - Ukulele Friends
- Kazuyuki Sekiguchi (The Southern All Stars) - Ukulele friends
- Ketsumeishi - Faculty of Pharmaceutical Sciences Connection
- FUNKY MONKEY BABYS

=== Relationships ===
As producer, composer, songwriter or arranger

0-9.

10 Jin Actor

A.

Ai Haruna, Alpha, Asia Engineer, AIDS Charity Project, Asano Irei, Aya Mizobuchi, Ayaka Hirahara, Ayumi Sakai

B.

Baseball☆Girls, Bishōjo club, Beni (singer), bless4, BoA

C.

Can'ce♥Hamahime, Cerisier, Chemistry, Chie, Coolon, Crystal Kay, C. W. Nicol, Cyclamen

D.

Daisuke Kawaguchi, Def Tech, DJ A☆Lucky, Dohzi-T,

E.

EDEN, Elephant Kashimashi, Ella Koon, Emi Tawata, eT, Every Little Thing,

F.

Freenote, Funky Kato, Funky Monkey Babys,

G.

Gekidan Bancho Boys☆, Gospellers

H

Hanako Oku, ♯HASHTAG, Hibari, Hiroshi Hashimoto, Hitomi (singer), Hitomi Shimatani, Home Made Kazoku,

I.

Issei Yoshimi, ITboys, Iwao Yamaguchi, The Ivory Brothers

J.

Jamil, Jamosa, Ji ma ma,

K.

K, Kanjani∞, Kazuyuki Sekiguchi, Kazuyuki Sekiguchi feat. Konishiki, Kazuyuki Sekiguchi & Sunayama All Stars, Keizo Nakanishi, Kenshiro, Ketsumeishi, Kingrass Hoppers, Koda Kumi, Kumiko Yamashita,

L.

Last First, Lead, Lecca, Leyona, Lisa, Lisa Melody, Love, Love Harmony's, Inc.(band),

M.

Mack Jack, Mai Hoshimura, Mao Abe, Masanori Sera, Mayo Okamoto, ♯ME*, Megumi, Michinoku Sendai ORI☆Hime Tai, miCKun, Micro (Def Tech), Mihimaru GT, Mika Nakashima, Mink, Minmi, Miriya Katou, Missing Link, Missing Link and Takemasa Tsukaji, Mito Gotōchi Idol (provisional), Momoko Suzuki, Moomin,

N.

Nao, Nanase Hoshii, Nēnēs, NEWS, Norimasa Fujisawa

O.

Orange Port

P.
Q.
R.

Rosetta Garden, RSP, Ryota Mitsunaga, Ryuji, Runningman Tokyo,

S.

Saki Kayama, SA.RI.NA., Seamonator & DJ Taki-Shit, Shota Shimizu, Skoop On Somebody, SMAP, Spontania (Hi-Timez), SoulJa, Soul Lovers, Sowelu, Sweep

T.

Takuya Ishida, Tee, Tetsu and Tomo, Thelma Aoyama, Three tight b, Tiara, Toshinobu Kubota,

U.

Unico, Unison Square Garden, Usher,

V.

V6, Vijandeux,

W.

Warp-generation

X.
Y.

Yasuko Agawa, Yanawabara, Yoko Kuzuya, Yubetsu main street,

Z.

Zenryoku Boys, Zooco

=== As bandmaster ===
Kazuyuki Sekiguchi & 1933 Ukulele All Stars
Kazuyuki Sekiguchi, who is a bassist and a member of Southern All Stars, called YANAGIMAN as a bandmaster in 2018 because he wanted to create a band like an orchestra with ukuleles. The album "FREE-UKES" will be released in August 2022 with musicians who love ukulele, Boo Takagi, Yoko Oginome, Yoshio Nomura, You Hatakeyama, and Kimiko Wakiyama. The title is combined by the plural form of "FREE" and "UKES" (the American designation).

=== As a collaborator ===
DJ Taki-Shit
Following the disbandment of his duo with the rapper Seamo, DJ Taki-Shit moved to Tokyo to study under Yanagiman in 2004.

Mack Jack
All the members of MACK JACK have been training with Yanagiman.

== Appearance ==
Radio series

- LOVE JAPAN (ShibuyaCross-FM, every Saturday at 13:00) *Program MC
