= Tatsuaki =

- Gender: Male

Origin
- Origin: Japanese
- Meaning: Different meanings depending on the kanji used

Tatsuaki (written: 辰明, 辰秋 or 達明) is a masculine Japanese given name. Notable people with the name include:

- Tatsuaki Egusa (江種 辰明; born 1976), Japanese judoka
- Tatsuaki Iwata (岩田 達明; 1926–2022), Japanese Go player
- Tatsuaki Kuroda (黒田 辰秋; 1904–1982), Japanese woodworker and lacquerware artist

== See also ==
- TATSUAKI, a fashion label by Dan Liu
