= Umbrella (Shota Shimizu album) =

Studio album by Shota Shimizu
- Released: November 26, 2008
- Recorded: 2008; October Studio, Giallo Polta, Studio Z'd, Tiny Voice Studio, Bunkamura Studio, Burnish Stone Komazawa, DGM Studio, Studio Somewhere, Sony Music Studio Tokyo, Prime Sound Studio Form, On Air Azabu
- Genres: R&B, Soul, Dance-pop, Funk, Acoustic music, Hip hop, Jazz, J-Pop
- Length: 60:11(standard edition); 65:51(Japan edition)
- Labels: Mastersix Foundation, Sony Music Records, Sony
- Producers: 3rd Productions, Coney's Jelly, Sty, Yanagiman, Ali Shaheed Muhammad

Shota Shimizu chronology
Umbrella (2008)	Journey (2010)

Singles from Umbrella
- 1. "Home" Released: February 20, 2008; 2. "Aishiteru" Released: June 4, 2008; 3. "Diggin' on U" Released: September 10, 2008; 4. "My Treasure" Released: October 22, 2008

Professional ratings
Review scores
Source	Rating
Allmusic	3/5 stars

Umbrella is the debut album by Japanese R&B singer Shota Shimizu, released on November 26, 2008 in Japan. The album ranked at #2 and sold 56,442 units in its first week. After eight weeks, it had sold 115,863 copies.

== Track listing ==
All songs written by Shota Shimizu.

1. "Diggin' on U"
2. "Home"
3. "With You"
4. "My Treasure"
5. "One Last Kiss"
6. "Love Story"
7. "Rainy Day's Morning"
8. "Unhappy"
9. "Lovin U"
10. "Aishiteru"
11. "My Love"
12. "Soulmate"
13. "Sorezore"
14. "Home" (Hip hop remix) (Japanese bonus track)

== Release history ==
Region	Date
Japan	November 26, 2008
Korea	November 27, 2008
Hong Kong	November 28, 2008
Taiwan	December 5, 2008 (CD +DVD)
Taiwan	January 9, 2009 (CD)
