= Beautiful (Miliyah Kato song) =

Single by Miliyah Kato

from the album Rose
- B-side: "At the Fever"
- Released: November 17, 2004
- Genre: J-pop; R&B
- Length: 4:54
- Label: Mastersix Foundation
- Songwriters: Miliyah Kato; Minoru Komori
- Producers: Hiroshi Matsui; Dev Large

Miliyah Kato singles chronology
"Never Let Go" / "Yozora" (2004)	"Beautiful" (2004)	"Dear Lonely Girl" (2005)

"Beautiful" is a song by Japanese singer-songwriter Miliyah Kato from her debut studio album Rose (2005). The song was written by Minoru Komori and Kato herself, while the production was done by Hiro Matsui. The single was released for the two versions of CD and digital download on 17 November 2004 through Mastersix Foundation as the second single from Rose. The limited version of the CD accompanied the bonus DVD featuring the two music videos, "Beautiful (BR Remix)" and "Yozora".

"Beautiful" is an up-tempo J-pop track with the elements of R&B and hip-hop. The single peaked at number 26 on the Oricon Weekly Singles Chart. The song served as the commercial song to the Lotte chewing gum brand Pure White Gum and the theme song to the Japanese television show Ryuha-R. The single's B-side track, "At the Fever" is a hip-hop track featuring the four Japanese rappers, Twigy, Nipps, Dev Large, and Shinnosk8. The song was later released as the promotional single for 12-inch single on 26 January 2005.

== Commercial performance ==
In Japan, "Beautiful" debuted at its peak, number 28 on Oricon Weekly Singles Chart, with the sales of 6,943 copies. It stayed on the chart for nine weeks, selling 16,272 copies in total.

== Track listing ==
CD single/digital download
No.	Title	Writer(s)	Arranger(s)	Length
1.	"Beautiful"	Miliyah Kato; Minoru Komori	Hiro Matsui	4:54
2.	"At the Fever" (featuring Twigy, Nipps, Dev Large, Shinnosuk8)	Kato; Twigy; H. Kimura; H. Kon; Shinnosuk8	Dev Large	4:54
3.	"Never Let Go" (Dance Hall Remix featuring Rudeboy Face)	Kato		4:14
4.	"Beautiful" (BR Remix)	Kato; Komori	Shingo. S	12:00:00
Total length:				19:14

Limited edition bonus DVD
No.	Title	Writer(s)	Length
1.	"Beautiful" (BR Remix / Music video)	Miliyah Kato; Minoru Komori	Shintaro Ehara
2.	"Yozora" (Music video)	Kato; M. Takesue; H. Kon

== Charts ==
=== Weekly charts ===
Chart (2004)	Peak position
Japan (Oricon)	26

== Certification and sales ==
Region	Certification	Certified units/sales
Japan (RIAJ)	None	16,272 (CD)

== Release history ==
Region	Date	Format	Catalogue Num.	Label	Ref.
Japan	17 November 2004	Digital download		Mastersix Foundation	
Japan	17 November 2004	CD	SRCL-5854	Mastersix Foundation	
Japan	17 November 2004	CD+DVD	SRCL-5852/3	Mastersix Foundation	
