= Journey (Shota Shimizu album) =

Studio album by Shimizu Shota
- Released: March 3, 2010
- Recorded: 2010
- Genres: R&B, J-pop
- Label: Mastersix Foundation

Shimizu Shota chronology
Umbrella (2008)	Journey (2010)	Colors (2011)

Singles from Journey
- 1. "Utsukushii Hibi yo / Sayonara wa Itsumo Sobani" Released: July 15, 2009; 2. "Kimi ga suki" Released: December 9, 2009; 3. "FOREVER LOVE" Released: February 3, 2010

Journey is the second album by Shimizu Shota, released on March 3, 2010. It was released in two versions: a regular edition (¥3,059) and a limited edition including a DVD (¥3,500).

== Track listing ==
CD:

1. Journey
2. Forever Love (Shota Shimizu × Miliyah Kato)
3. Kimi ga Suki (君が好き)
4. Cream
5. Starlight
6. Sayonara wa Itsumo Soba ni (さよならはいつも側に)
7. Kimi ga Ita kara (君がいたから)
8. Close to You
9. Utsukushiki Hibi yo (美しき日々よ)
10. Sakura (桜)
11. Days
12. Let's Groove (Bonus track)

DVD:

1. Sayonara wa Itsumo Soba ni (Music Video)
2. Utsukushiki Hibi yo (Music Video)
3. Kimi ga Suki (Music Video)
4. Family feat. Ken the 390, SHUN & COMA-CHI (Music Video)
5. Forever Love (Shimizu Shota x Miliyah Kato) (Music Video)
6. Mobile Music Drama "DOR@MO" Utsukushiki Hibi yo 「Minna Tsunagateru」 (みんなつながってる)

== Charts ==
Oricon Sales Chart (Japan)

Release	Chart	Peak position	Debut sales	Sales total	Chart run
March 3, 2010	Oricon Daily Albums Chart	1		117,200+	18 weeks
March 3, 2010	Oricon Weekly Albums Chart	1	57,155	117,200+	18 weeks
March 3, 2010	Oricon Monthly Albums Chart	5	104,289	117,200+	18 weeks
March 3, 2010	Oricon Yearly Albums Chart		117,189	117,200+	18 weeks
