= Velvet Grace =

2026 studio album by Miliyah Kato

Studio album by Miliyah Kato
- Released: March 18, 2026
- Recorded: 2023–2025
- Length: 37:02
- Language: Japanese
- Label: Mastersix Foundation
- Producer: Ryosuke "Dr. R" Sakai; Matt Cabb; Geg; KB; Shuya; KM; Chaki Zulu

Miliyah Kato chronology
Epiphany EP (2024)	Velvet Grace (2026)

Singles from Velvet Grace
- 1. "Lonely" Released: July 31, 2024; 2. "Aigyo" Released: October 23, 2024; 3. "#Tokyo Life" Released: September 17, 2025; 4. "One Last Kiss" Released: November 19, 2025

Velvet Grace is the thirteenth studio album by Japanese singer Miliyah Kato, released on March 18, 2026, via Sony Music Labels imprint Mastersix Foundation. The album is Kato's first in three years following the release of Blonde16. Preceded by the release of four singles, Velvet Grace features tracks produced by Ryosuke "Dr. R" Sakai, Matt Cab, Geg and Shuya.

== Background and release ==
After the release of her twelfth studio album, Blonde16 (2023), Miliyah Kato released a series of digital singles in 2023 and 2024, including "Lonely" featuring Japanese rapper Lana and "Aigyo" recorded with Japanese singer-songwriter Ringo Sheena. In January 2025, Kato released the Epiphany EP, a compilation EP of collaborative works. The EP was released digitally and on vinyl. Following its release, Kato revealed she was pregnant with her third child and took a short break from recording new music. In August 2025, she announced the birth of her third child.

In February 2026, Kato announced her thirteenth studio album, Velvet Grace. The album was later released digitally and physically on March 18, 2026. Two variants of the album were released physically: the standard edition and the first press edition. The first press edition of Velvet Grace included a 32-page photo book featuring photos taken for the album.

== Track listing ==
Velvet Grace track listing
No.	Title	Writer(s)	Producer(s)	Length
1.	"Bleeding Striker"	Miho Katō; Ryosuke Sakai	Sakai	3:14
2.	"One Last Kiss"	Katō; Geg	Geg	3:25
3.	"Naimo no Nedari" (ないものねだり)	Katō; KB; Shuya	KB; Shuya	3:19
4.	"Sad Song."	Katō; Sakai	Sakai	2:33
5.	"Lonely" (featuring Lana)	Katō; KM; Lana	KM	4:46
6.	"Kimi wa Saitei" (キミは最低)	Katō; Sakai	Sakai	3:07
7.	"Yūgure Toki wa Itsumo Setsunai" (夕暮れ時はいつも切ない)	Katō; Geg	Geg	3:38
8.	"Scars in My Heart"	Katō; Matt Cab	Cab	3:15
9.	"Aigyo" (愛楽) (with Ringo Sheena)	Katō; Chaki Zulu; T. Kura	Chaki Zulu	3:00
10.	"#Tokyo Life" (#東京LIFE)	Katō; Cab	Cab	3:03
11.	"Saving Grace"	Katō; Cab	Cab	3:42
Total length:				37:02

== Personnel ==
- Miliyah Kato – vocals (all tracks)
- Ryosuke "Dr. R" Sakai – mixing (1, 4, 6)
- D.O.I – mixing (3, 5)
- Noriaki Watanabe – mixing (7)
- Hidekazu Sakai – mastering (9)
- Matt Cab – mixing (8, 11)

== Charts ==
Chart performance for Velvet Grace
Chart (2026)	Peak position
Japanese Download Albums (Billboard Japan)	63
Japanese Top Albums Sales (Billboard Japan)	63

== Release history ==
Release history and formats for Velvet Grace
Region	Date	Format(s)	Version	Label	Ref.
Various	March 18, 2026	Digital download; streaming	Standard	Mastersix Foundation	
Japan	March 18, 2026	CD	Standard; first press	Mastersix Foundation	
