= Why (Miliyah Kato song) =

Single by Miliyah Kato

from the album Heaven
- B-side: "Destiny"; "You Don't Know Me"
- Released: November 18, 2009
- Recorded: Late 2009
- Genre: Pop, pop rock, urban
- Length: 17:01
- Label: Mastersix Foundation
- Songwriter(s): Miliyah Kato
- Producer(s): Shinichiro Murayama, Jeff Miyahara

Miliyah Kato singles chronology
"Love Forever" (2009)	"Why" (2009)	"Forever Love" (2010)

"Why" is Japanese singer-songwriter and composer Miliyah Kato's sixteenth single, and the first to be taken from her fifth studio album Heaven. It was released throughout Japan on November 18, 2009.

== Background and promotion ==
The title track "Why" is lyrically the sequel song to "Sayonara Baby" from 2008. A music video for the song was released as promotion, directed by Shigeaki Kubo. The first b-side "Destiny" was used as the main theme song for The Twilight Saga: New Moon, released on November 28 throughout Japan. The song could be heard in the Japanese trailers for the film. A music video, directed by Moocho, was also recorded for "Destiny".

Also featured on the single is the music video for "Aitai" from Kato's fourth studio album Ring, the video for "Aitai" later won the Best R&B Video award at the MTV Video Music Awards Japan 2010 on May 29, 2010.

== Track listing ==
All lyrics are written by Miliyah Kato

CD
No.	Title	Music	Arrangement	Length
1.	"Why"	Miliyah Kato	Shinichiro Murayama; Ittetsu Gen (Strings arrangement)	4:14
2.	"Destiny"	Kato, Jeff Miyahara	Jeff Miyahara	3:48
3.	"You Don't Know Me"	Kato	Manaboon	4:43
4.	"Why" (Instrumental)	Kato	Murayama	4:14
Total length:				17:01

DVD
No.	Title	Director	Length
1.	"Aitai" (Music Video)	Shigeaki Kubo
2.	"Aitai" (Making of Music Video)

== Charting and release ==
"Why" debuted at number ten on the Oricon weekly chart, a top 100 songs and artists chart, selling 15,189 copies that week. The single charted for ten weeks and to date has sold approximately 29,000 copies. That month the title track debuted and peaked at number two on the RIAJ Digital Track Chart behind "Futatsu no Kuchibiru" by Exile, before also being certified gold for full-length downloads. On the Billboard Japan Hot 100, the title track peaked at number eight on the week November 24–30, 2009.

== Charts ==
Released	Oricon Chart	Peak	Debut sales	Sales total
November 18, 2009	Daily Singles Chart	7		29,089
November 18, 2009	Weekly Singles Chart	10	15,189	29,089

Chart (2009)	Peak position
Japan (Oricon Singles Chart)	10
Japan (Japan Hot 100)	8
Japan (RIAJ Digital Track Chart)	2
