= Ring Tour 2009 =

Video by Miliyah Kato
- Released: May 26, 2010
- Recorded: November 18, 2009, Nippon Budokan
- Genre: Pop, R&B, urban
- Label: Mastersix Foundation

Miliyah Kato chronology
Tokyo Star Tour 2008 (2008)	Ring Tour 2009 (2010)	"Miliyah the Clips 2004-2010 (2010)

Ring Tour 2009 is the name of Miliyah Kato's third tour. It was released as a DVD on May 26, 2010. The DVD was recorded on November 18, 2009 at the Nippon Budokan arena. It's the #34 Music DVD of 2010 in Japan.

== Track listing ==
1. Love, Power & Soul
2. Sayonara Baby (SAYONARAベイベー, Goodbye Baby)
3. Breathe Again
4. Medley (Dear Lonely Girl, Kiss, Tough, Lalala, Love Is..., Ai ga Kieta)
5. Love
6. Koi Shiteru (恋シテル, I'm in Love)
7. Love for You
8. This is Love
9. Dance Tonight
10. Arigatou (ありがとう、, Thank You)
11. Power
12. 20 (Cry)
13. Anata ga Hoshii (あなたが欲しい, I Need You)
14. Kanashimi Blue (悲しみブルー, Sorrowful Blue)
15. Time is Money
16. Why
17. Soul
18. Aitai (I miss you)
19. Love Me, Hold Me
20. 19 Memories
21. People
22. Love Forever
23. Kono Machi no Dokoka de (この街のどこかで, Somewhere in This Town)
24. Happy Celebration
25. Kono Mama Zutto Asa Made (このままずっと朝まで, Up Until the Morning)
26. Ending

== Charts and sales ==
Chart (2010)	Peak position	First week sales	Total sales
Japan (Oricon DVD Chart)	2	19,018	56,809
