= Dan Liu =

Hong Kong Canadian fashion designer

- 廖建明
- Liu in 2013
- Born: British Hong Kong
- Other names: Liu Kin-ming; Dan Liu; Liu Tatsuaki
- Citizenship: Hong Kong; Canada
- Education: Aoyama Fashion College
- Occupations: Fashion designer; Television producer; Wardrobe Stylist
- Labels: TATSUAKI; AKI; DAN LIU; DAN LIU Design
- Website: www.danliudesign.com

Dan Liu
- Traditional Chinese: 廖建明
Transcriptions
Standard Mandarin
- Wade–Giles: Liào Jiànmíng
Yue: Cantonese
- Yale Romanization: Liuh Gin-mìhng

Dan Liu Kin Ming (Chinese: 廖建明; Cantonese Yale: Liuh Gin-mìhng) also known as; Dan Liu, Liu Tatsuaki (廖 建明, Ryō Tatsuaki) is a Hong Kongese and Japanese Canadian fashion designer and producing apparel, accessories and fashions for men and women. He is also the founder and the creative director of TATSUAKI fashion label. He was born in Hong Kong and is currently based in Toronto and Tokyo.

== Early life ==
Dan Liu was born in Hong Kong and because of his complex family background, he moved to Canada by himself when he was 16. Liu attended high school at Resurrection Catholic Secondary School in Kitchener, Ontario, Canada and studied at the University of Waterloo for Psychology and Computer Science. At his early age, Liu worked as a janitor, as a delivery guy, as a tutor and as a choreographer/dancer until producing various fashion shows for a major fashion group in Canada in 1995; this triggered his passion in fashion. In 1997, he decided to discontinue everything and went to Tokyo, Japan to study fashion design and marketing at Aoyama Fashion College.

== Fashion career ==
Liu worked for a fashion house TSUKI Fashion as a designer in the beginning. In 2002, he began working with Holt Renfrew Canada to promote his own label TATSUAKI by starting in 4 major Canadian cities; Montreal, Quebec; Toronto, Ontario; Calgary, Alberta and Vancouver, British Columbia until 2005 it was available across Canada. Liu went back to Tokyo, Japan in 2004 to launch his ready-to-wear collection and in 2006, he expanded his line with a lower price range label, AKI in Japan. In 2012, he started contracting with Hudson's Bay and became the first Asian Canadian fashion designer to launch his own label at the Bay in the 21st century. In November 2010, Liu was fashion design/consulting to clients as a stylist/designer at Hugo Boss Canada and he collaborated with Haight & Ashbury in Toronto, Ontario, Canada for men's clothing in March 2013.

In February 2016, Liu was first accepted by WME/IMG (IMG's Official NYFW: The Shows) to showcase his DAN LIU line at New York Fashion Week in New York City, United States. He was accepted again to showcase his 2017 Spring collection in September 2016 and since then, he is with IMG New York showcasing his collection at NYFW twice a year.

Liu has been named as 'King of Cocktail Dresses" and "Cocktail Dress Connoisseur" from the fashion industry since 2017. VRAI Magazine in the United States also called Liu as "Showman of New York Fashion Week" after he showcased his Spring/Summer 2019 Collection at New York Fashion Week at the Gallery 1 of Spring Studios on September 11, 2018, in New York City, New York.

== TATSUAKI label and DAN LIU label ==
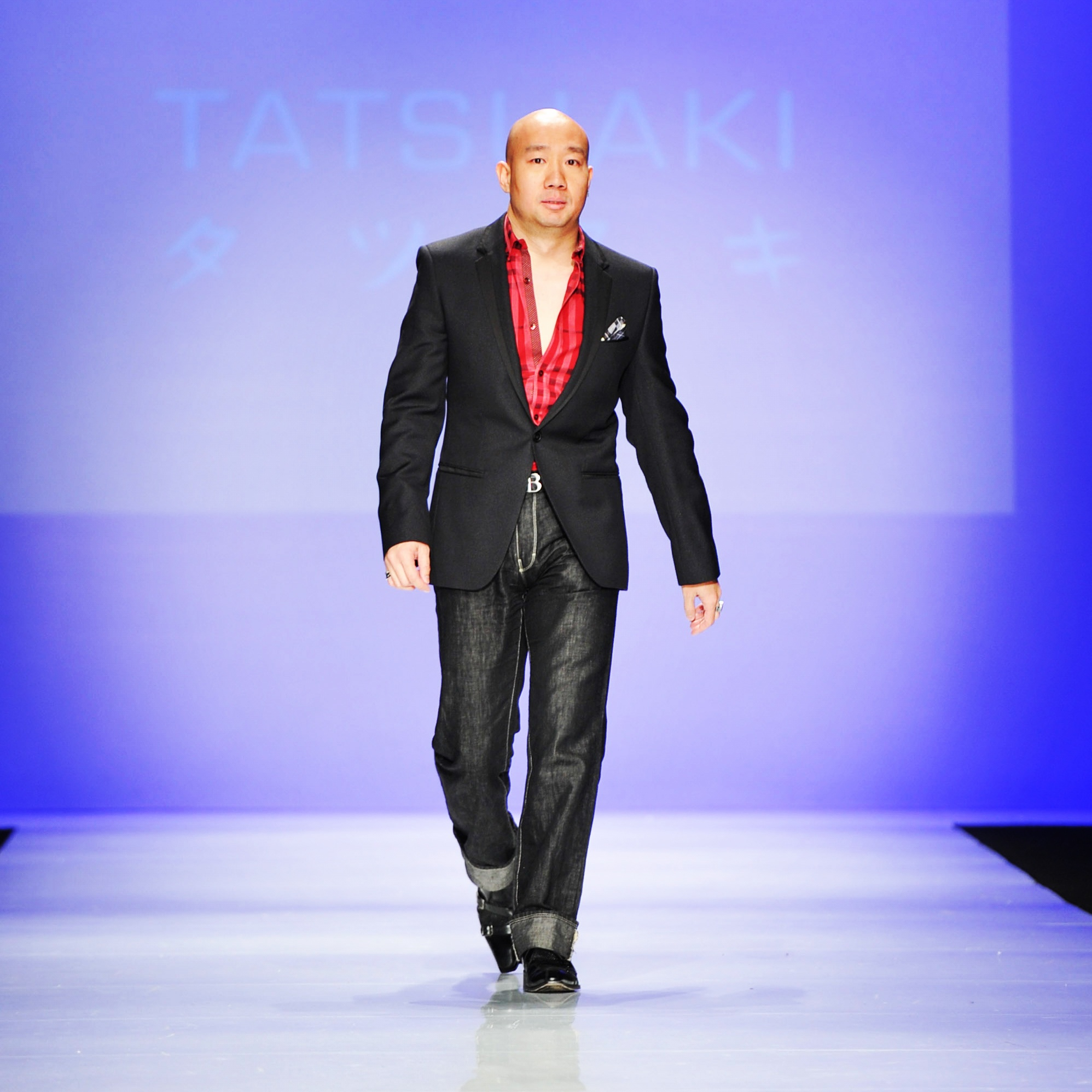
Dan Liu, as creative director of TATSUAKI fashion house, walked out at World MasterCard Fashion Week in Canada for 2015 Fall/Winter fashion show

TATSUAKI fashion was founded by Liu in 2002 and it's named after his Japanese name. The label emphasis on beauty and practicality and caters for women as ‟Funky Couture". The DAN LIU label was first noticed in February 2016 at New York Fashion Week by Liu as his high-end line and the collection appears to be more mature. Both collections often appears with knit, crochet, lace and embroidery details.

TATSUAKI garments have graced the racks at Holt Renfrew Canada and other notable boutiques in both Tokyo, Japan and Toronto, Canada. Dan Liu opened the flagship store of TATSUAKI in the heart of the Yorkville district of Toronto in 2002 and was frequented by stars such as Jennifer Love Hewitt, Renée Zellweger and Robin Williams.

== Fashion Girls by Dan - Fashion Makeover Reality Television Show ==
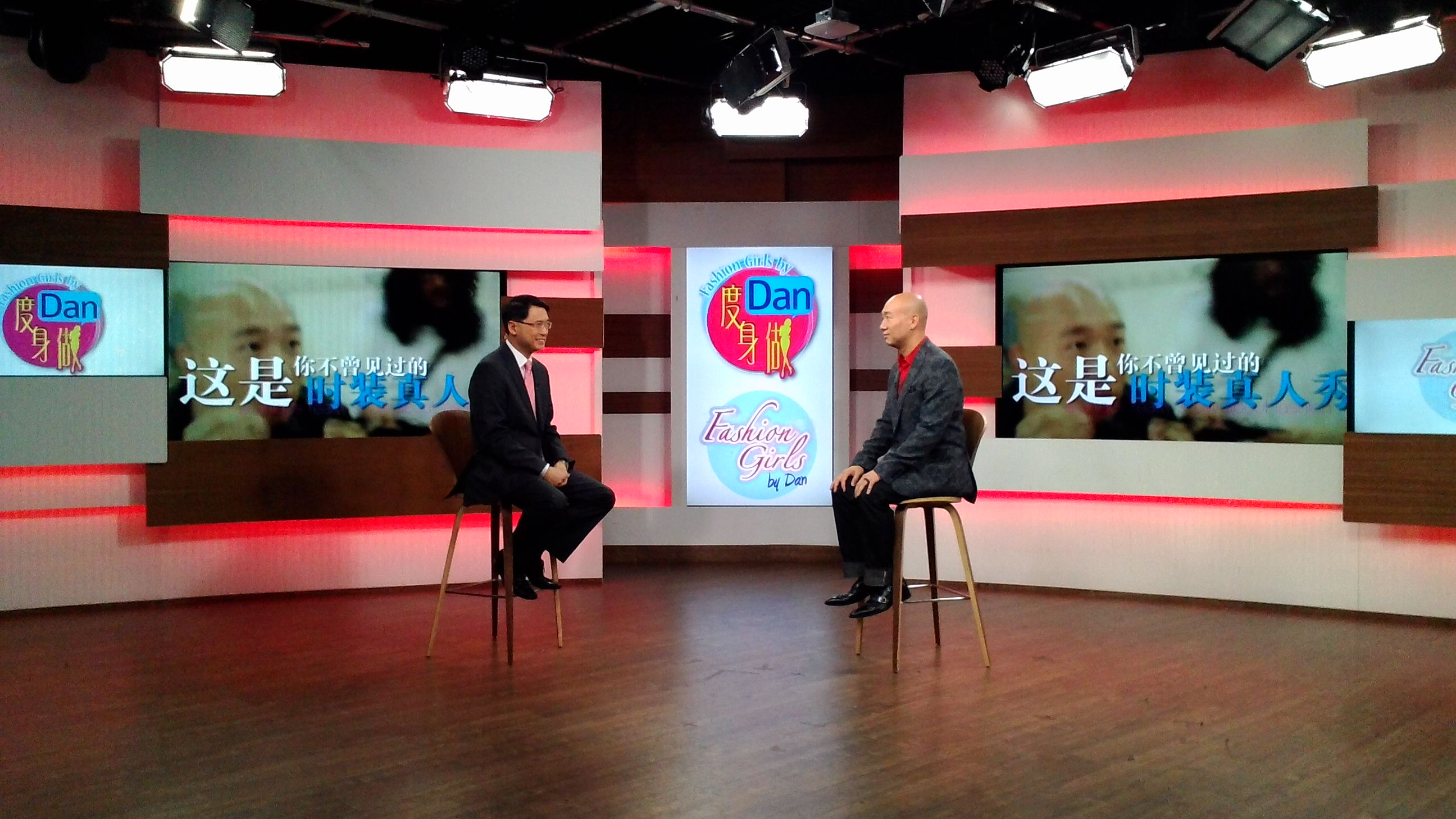
Dan Liu interviewed by Rogers Television, OMNI Channel, for the reality television show, Fashion Girls by Dan.

Fashion Girls by Dan is a spin-off of TLC's What Not To Wear and Look-A-Like reality TV show with an Asian inspiration from Fashion TV's Tokyo Girls in Japan. The reality show premise is the walk through transformation of an ordinary person and the discussion of real life issues. Dan will give the participants a head to toe transformation to help them look and feel better about themselves and to gain the confidence that they need to achieve their goal. The reality show began in the fall of 2014, contracted for 2 series by OMNI TV from Rogers Media Group, with 13 episodes for each series. It was aired on OMNI TV channel 2 nationwide in Canada. The show was also aired in China starting 2016.

== Personal life ==
Liu has extensive training in martial arts. He started training in Muay Thai since he was 15. Starting 1997, he learned iaido and bushido. According to him, practicing martial arts is not just a physical exercise, it's also mental. It is a life philosophy.
