= Aiaiai =

- Standard edition cover

Single by Miliyah Kato

from the album True Lovers
- B-side: "Dōkoku"
- Released: June 6, 2012
- Genre: Rock; electro; kayōkyoku
- Length: 4:32
- Label: Mastersix Foundation
- Songwriter(s): Miliyah Kato
- Producer(s): Miliyah Kato; Yoshiaki Ohnishi

Miliyah Kato singles chronology
"Roman" (2011)	"Aiaiai" (2012)	"Heart Beat" (2012)

"Aiaiai" is a song by Japanese singer-songwriter Miliyah Kato from her sixth studio album, True Lovers (2012). The song was written by Kato, who handled the production alongside Yoshiaki Ohnishi. The song served as the theme song for the Canadian-American television series The Firm in Japan, which was aired from 5 June 2012 on AXN Mystery, one day ahead of the single's release date. The single was released for the two versions of CD and digital download on 6 June 2012 through Mastersix Foundation as the third single from True Lovers. Ahead of the official release, the short version of the song was released on 16 May 2012 as a ringtone.

"Aiaiai" is a rock track with elements of kayōkyoku and electro. The single entered at number 16 on the Oricon Weekly Singles Chart and peaked at number 54 on the Billboard Japan Hot 100. It became Kato's first single to miss top 50 on the Japan Hot 100, and remained the only single to do so until "Piece of Cake -Ai wo Sakebou-" (2015) failed to enter the chart.

The accompanying music video was directed by Moocho and premiered on 23 May 2012 on YouTube. The video has been viewed for over 2.8 million times on the platform as of January 2021. Kato premiered "Aiaiai" at the Japanese fashion event Girls Award 2012 Spring/Summer at the Yoyogi National Gymnasium on 26 May 2012. The single's B-side track, "Dōkoku" is a cover version of Shizuka Kudo's single of the same title (1993). In April 2014, Kato performed the song on the television program Music Fair with Kudo.

== Commercial performance ==
In Japan, the single debuted at number 16 on the Oricon Weekly Singles Chart with the sales of 5,225 copies. It stayed on the chart for four consecutive weeks, selling approximately 7,200 copies in total. On the Billboard Japan Hot 100 chart dated 18 June 2012, "Aiaiai" debuted at number 54 and left the chart the following week. It became Kato's first single to miss top 50 on the Japan Hot 100, and remained the only single to do so until "Piece of Cake -Ai wo Sakebou-" (2015) failed to enter the chart.

== Track listing ==
CD single/digital download
No.	Title	Writer(s)	Arranger(s)	Length
1.	"Aiaiai"	Miliyah Kato	Manaboon; Yoshiaki Ohnishi	4:32
2.	"Dōkoku" (慟哭)	Tsugutoshi Gotō; Miyuki Nakajima	Ohnishi	4:42
3.	"Yūsha Tachi" (T.O.M Remix)	Kato	T.O.M	7:25
4.	"Aiaiai" (Instrumental)	Kato	Ohnishi	4:29
Total length:				19:08

Limited edition bonus DVD
No.	Title	Writer(s)	Director(s)	Length
1.	"Aiaiai" (music video)	Miliyah Kato	Moocho

== Charts ==
Chart (2012)	Peak position
Japan (Hot 100)	54
Japan CD (Oricon)	16
Japan Download (RIAJ)	7

== Certification and sales ==
Region	Certification	Certified units/sales
Japan (RIAJ)	None	7,297 (CD)

== Release history ==
Region	Date	Format	Catalogue Num.	Label	Ref.
Japan	16 May 2012	Ringtone		Mastersix Foundation	
Japan	6 June 2012	CD	SRCL-7986	Mastersix Foundation	
Japan	6 June 2012	CD+DVD	SRCL-7984/5	Mastersix Foundation	
Japan	6 June 2012	Digital download		Mastersix Foundation	
