= Best Destiny =

Greatest hits album by Miliyah Kato
- Released: November 5, 2008
- Recorded: 2004–2008
- Genres: Pop, contemporary R&B, hip hop, urban
- Label: Mastersix Foundation

Miliyah Kato chronology
Tokyo Star (2008)	Best Destiny (2008)	Ring (2009)

Singles from Best Destiny
- 1. "Sayonara Baby/Koi Shiteru" Released: September 24, 2008

Best Destiny is pop singer Miliyah Kato's fourth album, and first greatest hits collection. She described Best Destiny as the "Sampling Best [of·Miliyah Kato as a R&B musician]". It was released on November 5, 2008, and debuted on at number 1 on the Oricon weekly chart. The album sold 92,423 copies that week, becoming her first number 1 album on the charts. Best Destiny is certified Platinum by the Recording Industry Association of Japan. One single was taken from the album, "Sayonara Baby/Koi Shiteru" six weeks before the album's release. The second A-side "Koi Shiteru" (恋シテル, I'm in Love) was only featured.

== Track listing ==
CD
No.	Title	Lyrics	Music	Arranger(s)	Length
1.	"Koi Shiteru (Album Ver.)"	Jarvis La Rue Baker, Sylvester Jackson, Narada Michael Walden, Shanice Wilson, Miliyah	Jarvis La Rue Baker, Sylvester Jackson, Narada Michael Walden, Shanice Wilson, Miliyah
2.	"Kono Mama Zutto Asa Made" (このままずっと朝まで)	Anthony Kelly, Mark Wolfe, Steven Marsden, Wayne Passley, Miliyah	Anthony Kelly, Mark Wolfe, Steven Marsden, Wayne Passley, Miliyah	3rd Productions
3.	"Dear Lonely Girl" (ディア・ロンリーガール)	Takashi Matsumoto, Miliyah	Kyohei Tsutsumi, Miliyah	Shingo.S
4.	"19 Memories"	Tetsuya Komuro, Miliyah	Tetsuya Komuro, Miliyah	3rd Productions
5.	"Jōnetsu" (ジョウネツ "Passion")	Miliyah, UA	Miliyah, Hirofumi Asamoto, Shingo.S	3rd Productions
6.	"Ai ga Kieta Hi" (愛が消えた日)	Jeff Pence, Emosia, Eliot Sloan (Blessid Union Of Souls), Miliyah	Jeff Pence, Emosia, Eliot Sloan, Miliyah
7.	"Better days -sweet love side-"	Miliyah	Miliyah, Dohzi-T, Shingo.S
8.	"For So Long"	Lisa, Verbal, Taku, Miliyah	Lisa, Verbal, Taku, Miliyah
9.	"So gooood"	Rip Slyme, Miliyah	Rip Slyme, Miliyah	3rd Productions
10.	"Yozora" (夜空 "Night Sky")	M.Takesue, Miliyah	H.Kon, Miliyah	Shingo.S
11.	"One Day -Yozora Remix-" (Miliyah Kato loves m-flo)	Miliyah, m-flo	H.Kon, Miliyah, m-flo	m-flo
12.	"For So Long -Part II-"	m-flo, Miliyah	m-flo, Miliyah
13.	"Michelle ~Ai no Theme Remix~" (ミシェル ～愛のテーマRemix～ "Michelle ~Love Theme Remix~")	Miliyah	Yuji Ohno	3rd Productions
14.	"Futurechecka" (featuring Simon, Coma-Chi and Taro Soul)	Miliyah, Simon, Coma-Chi, Taro Soul & Maurice White	Miliyah, SIMON, Coma-Chi, Taro Soul & Maurice White	3rd Productions

DVD
No.	Title	Length
1.	"Koi Shiteru (Album Ver.)" (Music video)
2.	"Kono Mama Zutto Asa Made" (Music video)
3.	"Dear Lonely Girl" (Music video)
4.	"19 Memories" (Music video)
5.	"Jounetsu" (Music video)
6.	"Yozora" (Music video)
7.	"Futurechecka featuring Simon, Coma-Chi and Taro Soul" (Music video)

== Charts, sales and certifications ==
Chart (2008)	Peak position
Oricon Daily Albums Chart	1
Oricon Weekly Albums Chart	1
Oricon Yearly Albums Chart	57
Billboard Japan Top Albums	1

Country	Certification	Sales
Japan	Platinum	222,401
