= Tokyo Star =

Studio album by Miliyah Kato
- Released: April 2, 2008
- Recorded: 2007–2008
- Genre: Pop, Urban
- Label: Mastersix Foundation

Miliyah Kato chronology
Diamond Princess (2007)	Tokyo Star (2008)	Best Destiny (2008)

Singles from Tokyo Star
- 1. "My Girl (Feat. Color)" Released: May 30, 2007; 2. "Love Is..." Released: June 20, 2007; 3. "Lalala / Futurechecka" Released: October 17, 2007; 4. "19 Memories" Released: February 27, 2008

Tokyo Star is Miliyah Kato's third studio album. It was released on April 2, 2008, and has since become her second best selling album, peaking in its second week at #4. It produced four singles, My Girl, Love Is..., Lalala / Futurechecka and 19 Memories.

== Track listing ==
CD
No.	Title	Lyrics	Music	Arranger(s)	Length
1.	"Lalala feat. Wakadanna (Shōnan no Kaze)"	Miliyah, Wakadanna	Miliyah, Wakadanna, MINMI	MINMI	7:20
2.	"19 Memories"	Tetsuya Komuro, Miliyah	Tetsuya Komuro, Miliyah	3rd Productions	5:49
3.	"Better days -sweet love side-"	Miliyah	Dohzi-T, Shingo.S, Miliyah	3rd Productions	4:41
4.	"You Go Your Way"	Miliyah	Miliyah	Yanagiman	4:51
5.	"Kiss"	Miliyah	Miliyah	Tomokazu“T.O.M”Matsuzawa	4:50
6.	"Love Is..."	Miliyah	Miliyah	3rd Productions	4:45
7.	"Saigo no I LOVE YOU"	Miliyah	Miliyah	3rd Productions	4:33
8.	"Just Wanna Have Fun"	Miliyah	Miliyah	3rd Productions	3:58
9.	"Tough"	Miliyah	Miliyah	JEFF	3:24
10.	"Young Lady"	Miliyah	Miliyah	The Company	5:11
11.	"Sayonara"	Miliyah	Miliyah	3rd Productions	4:21
12.	"U gatta understand"	Miliyah	Miliyah	Tomokazu“T.O.M”Matsuzawa	4:58
13.	"Ai wa Kawarazu"	Miliyah	Miliyah	Cro-Magnon	5:38
14.	"Futurechecka feat. Simon, Coma-Chi & Taro Soul"	Miliyah	Simon, Coma-Chi & Taro Soul, Maurice White	3rd Productions	4:35
15.	"Tokyo Star"	Miliyah	Miliyah	JEFF	3:29

DVD （Limited edition only）
No.	Title	Length
1.	"Lalala feat. Wakadanna (Shōnan no Kaze) -Short Movie Version-" (Music video)
2.	"Lalala feat. Wakadanna (Shōnan no Kaze) -Myliyah's Premium Version-" (Music video)
3.	"19 Memories" (Music video)
4.	"making of 19 Memories"
