= Love Forever =

Single by Miliyah Kato featuring Shota Shimizu

from the album Ring
- Released: May 13, 2009 (Japan)
- Recorded: 2009
- Genre: R&B, J-Pop
- Label: Sony Music Entertainment Japan
- Songwriters: Shota Shimizu, Miliyah

Miliyah Kato featuring Shota Shimizu singles chronology
"20: Cry" (2009)	"'Love Forever'" (2009)	"Why" (2009)

"Love Forever" is a song by Japanese singer-songwriter Miliyah Kato, released as the third single from her fourth album, Ring, on May 13, 2009. It is a collaboration with fellow R&B/J-Pop singer Shota Shimizu, with whom Kato has previously collaborated with on the song "I'm Your Angel" from the album Tribute to Celine Dion (2007).

On its first day the single debuted at #6. Three days later it would reach #1 and remain there for the rest of the week, becoming Kato's first single to reach #1 on the Oricon Daily Charts. The single would go on to debut at #5 on the Oricon Weekly Charts with first week sales of 34,094 copies, earning Kato her first Top 5 single and fourth Top 10. Within two weeks after its release, "Love Forever" became Kato's best selling single to date.

Track #3 is a cover of R. Kelly and Céline Dion's 1998 hit of the same name.

== Track listing ==
CD
No.	Title	Writer(s)	Arrangement	Length
1.	"Love Forever (Miliyah Kato × Shota Shimizu）"	Shota Shimizu, Miliyah	3rd Productions
2.	"Looking Your Eyes"	Shota Shimizu, Miliyah	Manaboon
3.	"I'm Your Angel"	R. Kelly	3rd Productions
4.	"Love Forever" (Instrumental)

DVD
No.	Title	Length
1.	"Love Forever" (Music Video)

== Charts ==
Release	Chart	Peak position	First week sales	Sales total	Chart run
May 13, 2009	Oricon Daily Charts	1			
May 13, 2009	Oricon Weekly Charts	5	34,094	90,171	14 Weeks
May 13, 2009	Oricon Monthly Charts	13			
May 13, 2009	Oricon Yearly Charts	70			

== Certifications ==
Region	Certification	Certified units/sales
Japan (RIAJ)	Gold	100,000^{^}
^{^} Shipments figures based on certification alone.
