= Heaven (Miliyah Kato album) =

Studio album by Miliyah Kato
- Released: July 28, 2010
- Recorded: 2009–2010
- Genre: R&B
- Label: Mastersix Foundation

Miliyah Kato chronology
Ring (2009)	Heaven (2010)	M Best (2011)

Singles from Heaven
- 1. "Why" Released: November 18, 2009; 2. "Bye Bye" Released: March 24, 2010; 3. "Last Love" Released: June 9, 2010

Heaven is Miliyah Kato's fifth studio album. It was released on July 28, 2010.

== Album information ==
Heaven contains singles "Why, "Bye Bye" and "Last Love". It was released in two editions: a CD and a CD+DVD edition which contains a limited 52-page booklet and a DVD with the music videos of the singles, as well as the music videos for promo singles "Destiny" and "Sensation". The DVD also contains live performances from Kato's 2009 Ring Tour in Tokyo.

== Track listing ==
All tracks are written by Miliyah Kato, unless otherwise noted.

CD
No.	Title	Writer(s)	Arranger(s)	Length
1.	"Bye Bye"		Shinichiro Murayama	4:46
2.	"Last Love (Miliyah Kato song)"		Shinichiro Murayama	5:27
3.	"I Miss You"		Daishi Dance	5:12
4.	"X.O.X.O." (Sampling: Spitz's "Robinson")	Masamune Kusano (Spitz), Miliyah	3rd Productions	3:41
5.	"Heaven"		Tomokazu "T.O.M." Matsuzawa	5:34
6.	"Baby I See You feat. Verbal (M-Flo)"	Verbal (M-Flo), Miliyah	3rd Productions	6:33
7.	"Sora" (空 "Sky")		Nao Tanaka	4:50
8.	"Why"		Shinichiro Murayama	4:13
9.	"Free"		ZETTON	5:06
10.	"Endless Love"		Taku Takahashi (m-flo)	4:41
11.	"Sweet Angel"		Manaboon	4:34
12.	"Destiny"	Jeff Miyahara, Miliyah	Jeff Miyahara	3:47
13.	"B.F.F."		Tomokazu "T.O.M." Matsuzawa	4:10
14.	"Don't Wanna Let Go"		Bach Logic	3:09
15.	"Silent Ocean"		3rd Productions	5:13
16.	"Owarinaki Kanashimi" (終わりなき哀しみ "Endless Sorrow")		Shinichiro Murayama	3:53

DVD
No.	Title	Length
1.	"Why" (Music video)
2.	"Destiny" (Music video)
3.	"Bye Bye" (Music video)
4.	"Sensation" (featuring Kento Mori, music video)
5.	"Last Love" (Music video)
6.	"Sayonara Baby" (From Ring Tour 2009 at Zepp Tokyo)
7.	"Medley: Kiss" (From Ring Tour 2009 at Zepp Tokyo)
8.	"Medley: Tough" (From Ring Tour 2009 at Zepp Tokyo)
9.	"Medley: La La La" (From Ring Tour 2009 at Zepp Tokyo)
10.	"Medley: Love Is..." (From Ring Tour 2009 at Zepp Tokyo)
11.	"Love For You" (From Ring Tour 2009 at Zepp Tokyo)
12.	"20: Cry" (From Ring Tour 2009 at Zepp Tokyo)
13.	"Time is Money" (From Ring Tour 2009 at Zepp Tokyo)
14.	"Aitai" (From Ring Tour 2009 at Zepp Tokyo)
15.	"19 Memories" (From Ring Tour 2009 at Zepp Tokyo)
16.	"Love Forever" (From Ring Tour 2009 at Zepp Tokyo)

== Chart performance and certifications ==
The album debuted at number-one on the Oricon weekly album chart selling over 151,000 units, making it Miliyah's first studio album to debut at the top position on the Oricon charts.

=== Charts ===
Chart (2010)	Peak position
Japan Oricon Weekly Album Chart	1

=== Sales and certifications ===
Country	Provider	Sales	Certification
Japan	RIAJ	266,000	Platinum
