= Bye Bye (Miliyah Kato song) =

Single by Miliyah Kato

from the album Heaven
- B-side: Sensation; Koi ga Owaru Sono Toki ni
- Released: March 24, 2010
- Recorded: Early 2010
- Genre: Pop, R&B, pop-rock
- Length: 19:25
- Label: Mastersix Foundation
- Songwriter(s): Miliyah Kato
- Producer(s): Shinichiro Murayama

Miliyah Kato singles chronology
"Forever Love" (2010)	"Bye Bye" (2010)	"Last Love (Miliyah Kato song)" (2010)

"Bye Bye" is Miliyah Kato's eighteenth single. It was released on March 24, 2010.

== Promotion and tie-ups ==
The title track was the opening theme song for late night music television show CDTV during April and May 2010.

== Track listing ==
All tracks are written by Miliyah Kato, arranged by Shinichiro Murayama, strings arranged by Yuichiro Goto

CD
No.	Title	Length
1.	"Bye Bye"	4:46
2.	"Sensation"	4:39
3.	"Koi ga Owaru Sono Toki ni" (恋が終わるその時に "At the End of Love")	4:50
4.	"Sensation (Dance Edit)"	5:09
Total length:		19:25

DVD
No.	Title	Director	Length
1.	"Sensation featuring Kento Mori" (Music Video)	Moocho	5:17
Total length:			5:17

== Charts and sales ==
Released	Oricon Chart	Weekly Peak	Debut Sales	Sales Total	Chart Run
March 24, 2010	Daily Singles Chart	5		18,053	8 weeks
March 24, 2010	Weekly Singles Chart	8	10,899	18,053	8 weeks
March 24, 2010	Monthly Singles Chart	31		18,053	8 weeks
March 24, 2010	Yearly Singles Chart			18,053	8 weeks

Charts (2010)	Peak position
Oricon Weekly Singles Chart	8
Japan Hot 100	4
RIAJ Digital Track Chart	1
