= Ring (Miliyah Kato album) =

Studio album by Miliyah Kato
- Released: July 8, 2009
- Recorded: 2008–2009
- Genre: R&B, J-Pop
- Length: 68:57
- Label: Mastersix Foundation

Miliyah Kato chronology
| Best Destiny (2008) | Ring (2009) | Heaven (2010) |

Singles from Ring
- 1. "Sayonara Baby" Released: September 24, 2008; 2. "20: Cry" Released: January 28, 2009; 3. "Love Forever" Released: May 13, 2009

Ring is Miliyah Kato's fourth studio album. It was released on July 8, 2009. It contains singles, Sayonara Baby, 20: Cry, and her most successful single to date Love Forever. It was released in two editions, a CD Only and a CD+DVD edition which contains a DVD with the music videos of the singles and the first three episodes of the television drama for which 20-CRY- was the theme song. The album debuted at #2 on the Oricon Weekly Charts selling 150,000 units in its first week. This is Miliyah Kato's third album to debut within the top two and is her best-selling album to date.

== Track listing ==
All tracks are written by Miliyah Kato, unless otherwise noted.

CD
| No. | Title | Writer(s) | Arranger(s) | Length |
|---|---|---|---|---|
| 1. | "Sayonara Baby (Sayonara ベイベー; Farewell Baby)" | | Shinichiro Murayama | 4:29 |
| 2. | "Aitai (lit. I Miss You)" | | Shinichiro Murayama | 4:30 |
| 3. | "Love Forever (Featuring Shota Shimizu)" | Shota Shimizu, Miliyah | 3rd Productions | 5:12 |
| 4. | "Breathe Again" | | 3rd Productions | 4:32 |
| 5. | "Love for You" | | 3rd Productions | 3:58 |
| 6. | "Arigatou (ありがとう、; Thank You)" | | THE COMPANY | 4:41 |
| 7. | "Kono Machi no Dokoka de (この街のどこかで; Somewhere in This City)" | | Shinichiro Murayama | 4:18 |
| 8. | "Dance Tonight" | | Shinichiro Murayama | 3:59 |
| 9. | "20: Cry" | | Shinichiro Murayama | 4:10 |
| 10. | "Time Is Money" | | Tomokazu Matsuzawa | 4:40 |
| 11. | "Anata ga Hoshii (あなたが欲しい; I Want You)" | | 3rd Productions | 4:25 |
| 12. | "Love Me, Hold Me" | | Woo Philip | 5:05 |
| 13. | "Happy Celebration" | | Shiokawa Mitsuki | 5:14 |
| 14. | "This Is Love" | | MANABOON | 5:36 |
| 15. | "People" | | Shinichiro Murayama | 4:04 |

DVD
| No. | Title | Length |
|---|---|---|
| 1. | "Sayonara Baby" (Music Video) |
| 2. | "Koi Shiteru (恋シテル; I'm in Love)" (Music Video) |
| 3. | "20: Cry" (Music Video) |
| 4. | "Love Forever (Featuring Shota Shimizu)" (Music Video) |
| 5. | "Ketai Ongaku Drama "Dor@Mo" 20: Cry Episode 1: Birthday Present" |
| 6. | "Ketai Ongaku Drama "Dor@Mo" 20: Cry Episode 2: Hamburger" |
| 7. | "Ketai Ongaku Drama "Dor@Mo" 20: Cry Episode 3: Wasure Mono" |

== Charts ==
| Release | Chart | Peak position | First week sales | Sales total |
|---|---|---|---|---|
| July 8, 2009 | Oricon Daily Charts | 1 | 36,474 (First day sales) | 383,218 |
| July 8, 2009 | Oricon Weekly Charts | 2 | 150,768 | 383,218 |
| July 8, 2009 | Oricon Monthly Charts | 4 | 205,158 | 383,218 |
| July 8, 2009 | Oricon Yearly Charts | 18 | 357,630 | 383,218 |
