= Rose (Miliyah Kato album) =

Studio album by Miliyah Kato
- Released: October 26, 2005
- Recorded: 2004–2005
- Genre: Pop, urban
- Label: Mastersix Foundation

Miliyah Kato chronology
Rose (2005)	Diamond Princess (2007)

Singles from Rose
- 1. "Never Let Go/Yozora" Released: September 08, 2004; 2. "Beautiful" Released: November 17, 2004; 3. "Dear Lonely Girl" Released: March 24, 2005; 4. "Jōnetsu" Released: September 21, 2005

Rose is Miliyah Kato's first studio album, peaking at #2, It was released on October 26, 2005

== Track listing ==
No.	Title	Lyrics	Music	Arranger(s)	Length
1.	"Yozora (夜空; Night Sky)"	M.Takesue, Miliyah	H.Kon, Miliyah	Shingo.S	3:51
2.	"Dear Lonely Girl"	Takashi Matsumoto, Miliyah	Kyohei Tsutsumi, Miliyah	Shingo.S	3:29
3.	"Don’t Stop!"	Miliyah	Shingo.S	3rd Productions	3:32
4.	"Beautiful"	Miliyah	Minoru Komorita	Hiroshi Matsui	4:51
5.	"My Life"	Miliyah	Miliyah	OCTOPUSSY	4:01
6.	"Love Me, I Love You"	Miliyah	Shingo.S	3rd Productions	5:06
7.	"Ride wit U"	Miliyah	Yanagiman	Yanagiman	4:38
8.	"Eien no Koe (永遠の声; Eternal voice)"	Bill Withers、William Salter, Ralph MacDonald、Miliyah	Bill Withers, William Salter, Ralph MacDonald	Kazuo Ishijima	4:44
9.	"Never Let Go"	Miliyah	Miliyah, Maestro-T	Maestro-T	4:31
10.	"I Cry"	Miliyah	Miliyah	3rd Productions	3:45
11.	"Jōnetsu (ジョウネツ; Passion)"	UA, Miliyah	Hirofumi Asamoto, Shingo.S, Miliyah	3rd Productions	5:03
12.	"Rose"	Miliyah	Miliyah	BACH LOGIC	3:17
13.	"Star"	Miliyah	Miliyah, Shingo.S	3rd Productions	5:25
14.	"One Day ~Yozora Remix~" (Miliyah Kato loves M-flo)	M-flo, Miliyah	M-flo, Miliyah, H.Kon	3rd Productions	5:17

== Charts ==
Rank	Sales
2	238,302
