= Shota Shimizu =

Shota Shimizu 清水 翔太
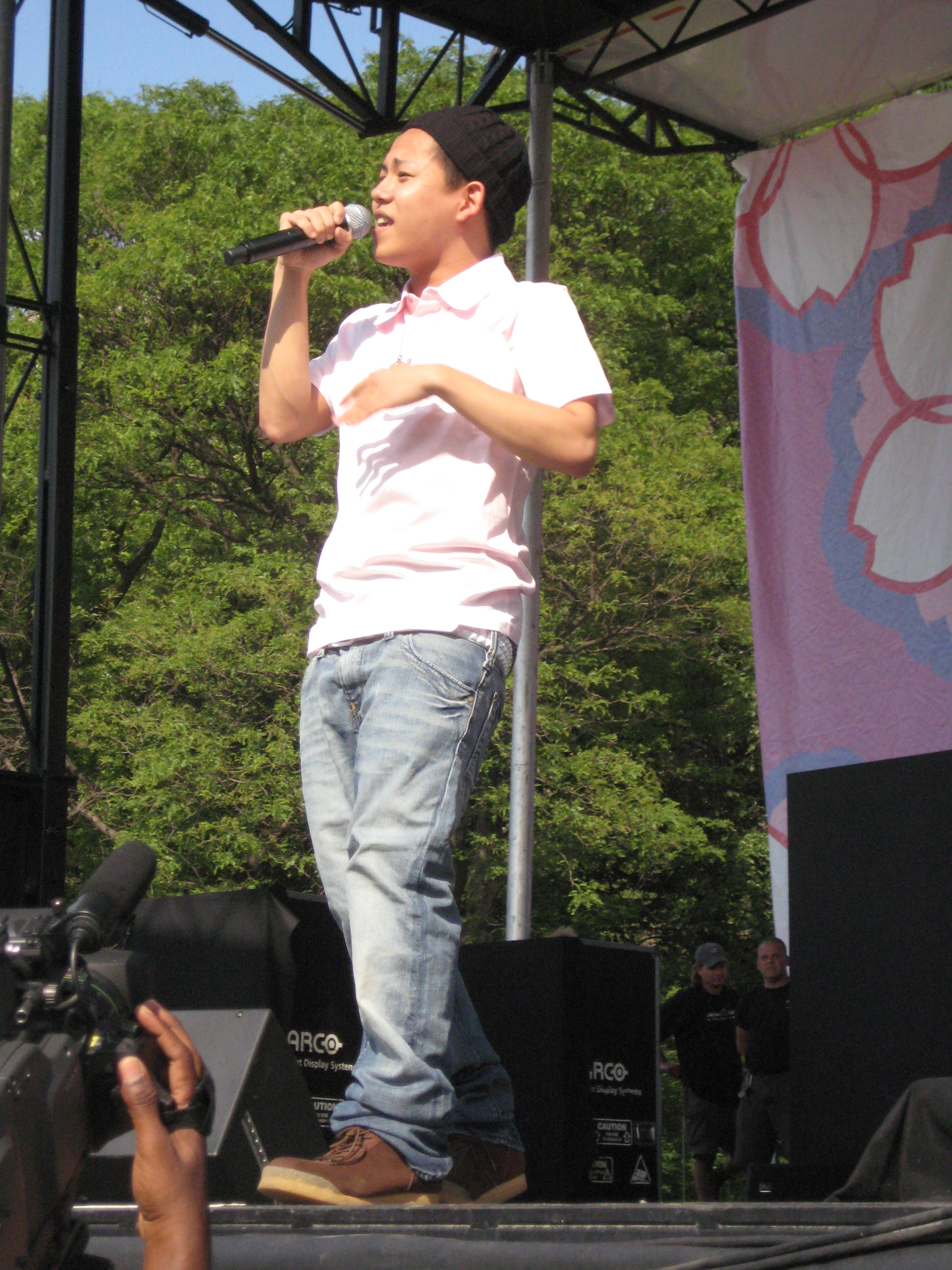
- Shota Shimizu performing at Japan Day 2008 in Central Park, New York City

Background information
- Born: February 27, 1989 (age 37); Yao, Osaka, Japan
- Genres: J-pop, R&B
- Occupations: Singer-songwriter, musician, rapper
- Years active: 2008–present
- Label: Mastersix Foundation
- Website: www.shimizushota.com

Shota Shimizu (清水 翔太, Shimizu Shōta; born 27 February 1989) is a Japanese singer-songwriter and musician from Yao, Osaka, Japan, who debuted in 2008. On June 1, 2008, Shimizu performed at Central Park in New York City during the annual Japan Day Festival. Shota Shimizu went to a local Christian school in Osaka where he learned how to sing gospel music. He became captivated with soul music, which is how his music career started. He was inspired by Donny Hathaway, Marvin Gaye, and Ray Charles.

Before his debut, in November 2007, Shimizu sang in English on amateur night at the Apollo Theater in New York City. He was called a "one in a million soul singer" by a local newspaper in New York. The second time he performed at the Apollo Theater was on November 19, 2008. He sang the song "Sukiyaki" by Kyu Sakamoto in Japanese, where he was given a standing ovation from an audience of 1,500 people. He said he sang it because he wanted to show his Japanese pride and demonstrate the beauty of the Japanese language.

== Career ==
=== Umbrella (2008) ===
Shimizu's first single, titled "Home", was released on February 20, 2008, and he appeared on Music Station two days after the single's release to promote it. "Home" peaked at ranked at number 5 and sold 27,820 units in its first week. After 17 weeks, it had sold 125,735 copies. His second single, "Aishiteru" (アイシテル, I Love You), was released on June 4, 2008, in Japan. It ranked at number 4 and sold 22,778 units in its first week. After 12 weeks, it had sold 47,114 copies. Shimizu released his third single "My Treasure" on October 22, 2008. It ranked at number 15 and sold 9,540 units in its first week. After 5 weeks, it had sold 15,365 copies.

He released his debut album titled Umbrella, on November 26, 2008, in Japan. The album ranked at number 2 and sold 56,442 units in its first week. After 8 weeks, it has sold 115,863 copies. In March 2009, Shimizu began his first headlining tour, the "Umbrella Tour 2009". The tickets sold out in one day.

=== After Umbrella (2009) ===
Shimizu released his fourth single titled "Utsukushii Hibi yo" / "Sayonara wa Itsumo Sobani" on July 15, 2009, in Japan. It debuted at number 14 and sold 8,576 copies in the first week. The track "Kaze no Youni" from this single was inspired by the song "Kaze no Dōkei" from the Chrono Trigger Soundtrack. The single sold a total of 11,144 copies so far.

=== Collaborations ===
Shimizu worked with Dohzi-T on the single "One Love", which was released on July 18, 2007. He also collaborated with Miliyah Kato on the song "I'm Your Angel" on the album Tribute to Celine Dion, which was released on September 26, 2007. He collaborated on the song "Be With You", a duet with R&B Legend Joe, in 2008. Shimizu collaborated with Miliyah Kato again in 2009 on her "Love Forever" single (which was also released onto Miliyah Kato's album, Ring), which was released on May 13, 2009. "Love Forever" was a hit in Japan, and its ringtone sold over two million downloads. These Japanese singers/songwriters were both twenty years old and loved soul music, but still maintained very different music styles. On September 16, 2009, M-flo released a tribute album named Tribute: Maison de M-Flo and Shimizu covered the song "Let Go". He then released a song, "Loving You", in a compilation album named Beat Connection with Crystal Kay, Seamo, Mummy-D, and Dohzi-T on October 27, 2010.

== Discography ==
=== Singles ===
CD

#	Title	Release date	Oricon charts		Album
#	Title	Release date	Weekly Ranking	Sales	Album
Debut	"Home": 2008 Year-End Singles Chart: 50; RIAJ Certification: Gold	20.02.2008	5	128,000	Umbrella
2nd	"Aishiteru" (「アイシテル」, I Love You)	04.06.2008	4	47,000	Umbrella
3rd	"My Treasure"	22.10.2008	15	15,000	Umbrella
4th	"Utsukushii Hibi yo/Sayonara wa Itsumo Sobani" (美しき日々よ/さよならはいつも側に)	15.07.2009	14	13,000	Journey
5th	"Kimi ga Suki" (君が好き)	09.12.2009	8	19,000	Journey
6th	"Goodbye"	07.07.2010	10	14,000	Colors
7th	"Kimi ga Kurasu Machi" (君が暮らす街)	20.10.2010	12	9,000	Colors
8th	"You & I"	26.11.2011	14	11,000	Colors
9th	"Love"	29.06.2011	16	7,000	Naturally
10th	"Mada Owaranai" (マダオワラナイ)	26.10.2011	17	7,000	Naturally
11th	"Fuyu ga Owaru Mae ni" (冬が終わる前に)	21.12.2011	19	6,000	Naturally
12th	"Kimi Sae Ireba" (君さえいれば): feat. Oda Kazumasa	22.02.2012	15	7,000	Naturally
13th	"366 Nichi" (３６６日): feat. Nakasone Izumi (HY)	12.09.2012	11	10,000	MELODY
14th	"Woman Don't Cry"	03.07.2013	18	5,000	Encore
15th	"Dream"	29.01.2014	28	5,000	Encore
16th	"Snow Smile"	12.11.2014	26		ALL SINGLES BEST
17th	"I Miss You (Refrain)"	21.01.2015	31		ALL SINGLES BEST
18th	"Bye×Bye"	22.07.2015	41	2,000	PROUD
19th	"Hanataba no Kawari ni Melody wo" (花束のかわりにメロディーを)	28.10.2015	32	5,000	PROUD
20th	"Damage"	17.02.2016	25		PROUD
21st	"My Boo"	05.10.2016	15		FLY
22nd	"Fire"	21.02.2017	22		FLY
23rd	"Good Life"	24.01.2018	25		WHITE
24th	"Friday"	16.05.2018	16		WHITE

Digital

#	Title	Release Date	Oricon Charts		Album
#	Title	Release Date	Weekly Ranking	Sales	Album
1st	"Diggin' On U"	10.09.2008	-	-	Umbrella
2nd	"Summer Time"	04.08.2010	100	-	COLORS
3rd	"Sorry"	26.06.2019	-	-	period
4th	"Breathe Again"	21.08.2019	-	-	period
5th	"416"	15.04.2020	-	-	period
6th	"Koi Uta" (恋唄)	19.05.2021	-	-	HOPE
7th	"Baby I Love You So"	14.09.2022	-	-	
The First Take Music
-	"Hanataba no Kawari ni Melody wo" (花束のかわりにメロディーを) - From THE FIRST TAKE	21.07.2021	-	-	
-	"Koi Uta" 恋唄 - From The First Take	13.10.2021	-	-	

=== Albums ===
==== Studio albums ====
No.	Information	Release date	Oricon Charts	
No.	Information	Release date	Weekly Albums Charts	Sales
1st album	Umbrella: RIAJ Certification: Gold	26.11.2008	2	124,000
2nd album	Journey: RIAJ Certification: Gold	03.03.2010	1	117,000
3rd album	Colors: RIAJ Certification: Gold	09.03.2011	7	69,000
4th album	Naturally	21.03.2012	6	29,000
5th album	Encore	14.03.2014	11	16,930
6th album	Proud	30.03.2016	10	14,165
7th album	Fly	28.06.2017	11	
8th album	White	27.06.2018	12	
9th album	Hope	21.07.2021	13	
10th album	Insomnia	28.06.2023	15	3,357

==== Cover albums ====
#	Information	Release date	Oricon Charts	
#	Information	Release date	Weekly Albums Charts	Sales
1	Melody	28.11.2012	5	66,000

==== Best albums ====
#	Information	Release date	Oricon Charts	
#	Information	Release date	Weekly Albums Charts	Sales
	The Best: Collaboration Album with Miliyah Kato	02.04.2014	4	51,000
1	All Singles Best	25.02.2015	9	15,000

Mini albums

#	Information	Release date	Oricon Charts	
#	Information	Release date	Weekly Albums Charts	Sales
1	Period	11.11.2020		

=== Collaborations ===
==== Singles ====
Information	Release date	Oricon Charts		Album
Information	Release date	Weekly Single Charts	Sales	Album
One Love: Dohzi-T feat. Shota Shimizu	18.07.2007	98		ONE MIC
Love Forever: RIAJ Certification: Gold; Miliyah Kato x Shota Shimizu	13.05.2009	5	90,000	THE BEST
"Oyasumi no Kisu Wo (Good Night My Love)" (おやすみのキスを～Good Night My Love～): Double x Shota Shimizu	11.11.2009	19	14,000	Ballad Collection Mellow
Forever Love: Shota Shimizu x Miliyah Kato	03.02.2010	4	60,000	THE BEST
Believe: Kato Miliyah x Shimizu Shota	13.07.2011	9	16,000	THE BEST
Love Story: Kato Miliyah x Shimizu Shota	17.04.2013	12	10,000	THE BEST

==== Participation in Albums ====
Information	Release date	Album
I'm Your Angel: Miliyah Kato & Shota Shimizu	26.09.2007	Tribute to Celine Dion
Midnight Train: Lyfe Jennings feat. Shota Shimizu	18.06.2008	Lyfe Change
Smile: Dohzi-T feat. Shota Shimizu	13.05.2009	4 ever
One Last Kiss: Shun feat. Shota Shimizu	10.03.2010	Ryuha-R Beginnings
Stay: Ken the 390 feat. Shota Shimizu	07.04.2010	NEW ORDER
Roll with Me: Joe duet with Shimizu Shota	28.07.2010	Joe Live from Japan
Stay: Thelma Aoyama feat. Shimizu Shota	16.09.2015	Gray Smoke

=== Other appearances ===
Information	Release date	Album
Let Go	16.09.2009	m-flo Tribute: Maison de m-flo
Home	03.02.2010	Ryuha-R Greatest Hits
"Ai wa Kawarazu" (愛は変わらず)	28.10.2020	Inspire
