= Miliyah Kato =

Japanese singer (born 1988)

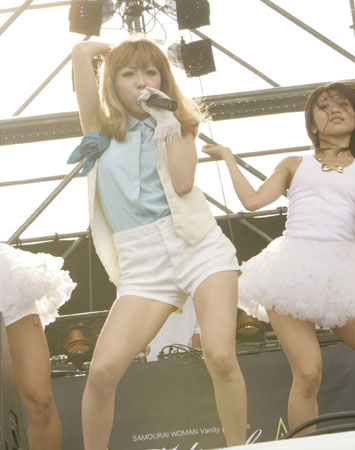
- Kato performing, 2009
- Born: Miho Katō; June 22, 1988 (age 38); Toyota, Aichi, Japan
- Occupations: Singer; songwriter; fashion designer; author
- Musical career
- Genres: J-pop; pop; R&B; hip-hop
- Instrument: Vocals
- Years active: 2004–present
- Label: Mastersix Foundation
- Website: miliyah.com

Miho Katō (加藤 美穂, Katō Miho; born June 22, 1988), known professionally as Miliyah Kato (加藤 ミリヤ, Katō Miriya), (Note: Internationally, she refers to herself as Miliyah Japanese: ミリヤ, romanized: Miriya.) is a Japanese pop and urban singer, songwriter, fashion designer, and author. In 2003, Kato started her career as a singer when she provided vocal to Reggae Disco Rockers' song "Cherry Oh! Baby". Her hip-hop-influenced debut album, Rose (2005) was certified platinum in Japan. She gained further recognition when she was featured in M-Flo's track "One Day" (2005). Kato's second studio album Diamond Princess achieved minor commercial success, certified gold by the RIAJ and peaking at number five in Japan. Her third studio album, Tokyo Star (2008) yielded her first top-ten single, "La La La", which was later certified double-platinum for its ringtone sales. Kato's first compilation album Best Destiny (2008) became her first number-one album, certified platinum in Japan. Her fourth studio album Ring became her best-selling album, and yielded three top-ten singles: "Sayonara Baby", "20 -Cry-", and "Love Forever", which was certified million in Japan. The song from the album, "Aitai" were certified triple-platinum despite being not released as a single. Her fifth studio album Heaven (2010) debuted atop on the Oricon chart and has yielded two platinum singles, "Why" and "Last Love".

Kato's second compilation album M Best (2011) became her second consecutive number one album, selling over 300,000 copies nationwide. In 2011, Kato published her first novel, "Umareta mama no Watashi wo", which marked her debut as an author. Her sixth and seventh studio album True Lovers (2012) and Loveland (2014) reached top three in Japan. The former has yielded three gold-certified songs, "Yūsha Tach", "Lovers Part II", and "Konya wa Boogie Back". The Japanese version of The Twilight Saga: New Moon uses her song "Destiny" as its theme song. In 2014, Kato recorded a collaborative album, The Best, with a Japanese singer-songwriter Shota Shimizu. Her next albums, Liberty (2016) and Utopia (2016), both reached top five in Japan. Her tenth studio album, Femme Fatale (2018) was released to a minor commercial success, only reaching number eight in Japan.

Kato is known for popularizing sampling in the J-pop scene, and has incorporated a wide range of tracks in her songs. Regarded as one of the biggest J-pop musicians in the late 2000s and the early 2010s, Kato has sold over 12.6 million records and ringtones.

== History ==
In 2001, when she was around 13 years old, she passed a Sony audition. She began writing music and lyrics from the age of 14. Before her official debut she sang support vocals for other musicians and performed in commercials. Katō made her debut with the release of the single "Never Let Go/Yozora" (2004) and released her debut album Rose (2005) the next year. She is influenced by hip hop and R&B music, especially artists Lauryn Hill and Mary J. Blige. Her music also makes frequent use of sampling. Katō herself has said that her music uses hip hop and R&B as a base, and aims for a middle ground which is neither overly pop nor overly hardcore. Katō graduated from the Meiji Gakuin Senior High School in Tokyo. She grew up in a single-parent household, with her mother and brother. Her father operated a gem store before his death.

At the time of her debut in 2004 she was called the "post-Hikaru Utada" (ポスト宇多田ヒカル, posuto Utada Hikaru), referring to the two artists' similarities, from their lyrics to their shared "high school girl charisma". Around the time of her debut, the fact that she was still actually in high school was often emphasized. From participating in making the visuals for her CD jackets to producing her own fashion brand, she also has some influence in visual and fashion areas. Those who are influenced by her music, fashion and acts are called "Miliyers" (ミリヤー, miriyaa).

== Discography ==
- Rose (2005)
- Diamond Princes (2007)
- Tokyo Star (2008)
- Ring (2009)
- Heaven (2010)
- True Lovers (2012)
- Loveland (2014)
- Liberty (2016)
- Utopia (2017)
- Femme Fatale (2018)
- Who Loves Me (2021)
- Blonde16 (2023)
- Velvet Grace (2026)
