= Kansha!!!!! – Thank You for 20 Years New and Best =

2019 greatest hits album by Ai

Greatest hits album by Ai
- Released: November 6, 2019
- Recorded: 2003–2019
- Genre: R&B; gospel; hip hop; pop
- Length: 108:21
- Language: Japanese; English
- Label: EMI
- Producer: Ai; Ryosuke Imai; B.Slade; Gerald Haddon; Uta; C3prod; Michael Fountain; Stephanie Stokes Fountain; Dj Yutaka; Gakushi; 2 Soul For 2 Soul; DJ Watari; Jin; Desert Storm; Lofey; Skane

Ai chronology
Wa to Yo (2017)	Kansha!!!!! – Thank You for 20 Years New and Best (2019)	It's All Me, Vol. 1 (2020)

Singles from Kansha!!!!! – Thank You for 20 Years New and Best
- 1. "Baby You Can Cry" Released: September 27, 2019

Kansha!!!!! – Thank You for 20 Years New and Best (感謝!!!!! – Thank You for 20 Years New and Best) is the fourth greatest hits album by Japanese-American singer-songwriter Ai. It was released on November 6, 2019, through EMI Records. Released in two physical configurations, disc one contains three new songs and six re-recorded gospel tracks of her previous hit singles while disc two contains material previously not available outside of Asia. The album served as Ai's first international compilation release.

Kansha!!!!! – Thank You for 20 Years New and Best debuted and peaked at number 29 on the Japan Oricon weekly albums chart, charting for nine weeks.

== Background and release ==
To celebrate her twenty-year anniversary in the music industry and the then upcoming 2020 Summer Olympics, Ai traveled to Los Angeles, California to record new material, which later was revealed to be It's All Me, Vol. 1 (2020) and It's All Me, Vol. 2 (2021). While recording new material, Ai recorded gospel arrangements of her previously released hit singles. Recording too many songs, the staff of Ai's label, EMI Records, decided to split her recordings into different releases.

The album was announced by Universal on September 17, 2019 along with a series of projects by Ai. The album was teased in a video posted by Ai on her social media, including the album cover, title and tracks later that month.

== Promotion ==
To promote the album, Ai embarked on a national tour in Japan with a gospel choir from November 2019 to December 2019.

== Commercial performance ==
Kansha!!!!! – Thank You for 20 Years New and Best debuted and peaked at number 29 on the Japan Oricon weekly albums chart for the week of November 18, 2019. The album continued to stay on the chart for nine weeks. On the Billboard Japan Hot Albums chart, the album debuted and peaked at number 28.

== Track listing ==
Credits adapted from Tidal and official album profile. All tracks written by Ai Uemura unless noted.

Kansha!!!!! – Thank You for 20 Years New and Best track listing
No.	Title	Writer(s)	Producer(s)	Length
1.	"Baby You Can Cry"	Ai Uemura; Ryosuke Imai	Uemura; Imai	3:13
2.	"Lift 'em Up" (featuring B.Slade)	Uemura; Anthony Williams II	Uemura; Williams II	3:45
3.	"Laughin' Medicine" (ラフィン・メディスン)	Uemura; Williams II	Uemura; Williams II	3:50
4.	"Happiness" (ハピネス Gospel Version)		Uemura; Gerald Haddon	4:21
5.	"Story" (Gospel Version)		Uemura; Haddon	6:14
6.	"Minna ga Minna Eiyū" (みんながみんな英雄 Gospel Version)	Makoto Shinohara	Uemura; Haddon	4:00
7.	"Dear Mama" (ママへ Gospel Version)		Uemura; Haddon	4:35
8.	"Life" (Gospel Version)	Uemura; Stephanie Stokes Fountain	Uemura; Haddon	5:28
9.	"No Weapon" (Gospel Cover)	Alvin Moore; Fred Hammond	Uemura; Haddon	4:56
Total length:				39:02

Kansha!!!!! – Thank You for 20 Years New and Best – limited edition bonus disc / digital bonus volume
No.	Title	Writer(s)	Producer(s)	Length
1.	"Minna ga Minna Eiyū" (みんながみんな英雄)	Makoto Shinohara	Uemura; Uta	3:02
2.	"Kira Kira" (キラキラ) (featuring Naomi Watanabe)		Uemura; Uta	3:40
3.	"Hanabi"		Uemura; Uta	4:01
4.	"Wavin' Flag Coca-Cola Celebration Mix" (Version Ai)	Andrew Bloch; Bruno Mars; Edmond Dunne; Jean Duval; Keinan Abdi Warsame; Phillip Lawrence	Uemura; Uta	3:49
5.	"You Are My Star"	Uemura; Uta	Uta	4:38
6.	"Dear Mama" (ママへ)		Uemura; C3prod	3:58
7.	"Feel It"		Uemura; Uta	3:11
8.	"Fake" (featuring Namie Amuro)		Uta	4:15
9.	"Voice"		Uemura; Uta	5:12
10.	"Life" (The Best Version)	Uemura; S. Fountain	Michael Fountain; S. Fountain	4:24
11.	"Believe"		Dj Yutaka	4:32
12.	"Happiness" (ハピネス)		Uemura; Uta	4:14
13.	"Happy Christmas"		Uemura; Uta	5:23
14.	"Music Is My Life"		Uemura; Gakushi	6:07
15.	"Story"		2Soul	4:48
16.	"I Wanna Know"		DJ Watarai; Jin	4:16
17.	"Last Words"		Uemura; Desert Storm; Lofey; Skane	3:24
Total length:				69:19

== Charts ==
Chart performance for Kansha!!!!! – Thank You for 20 Years New and Best
Chart (2019)	Peak position
Japanese Albums (Oricon)	29
Japanese Combined Albums (Oricon)	28
Japanese Digital Albums (Oricon)	34
Japanese Hot Albums (Billboard Japan)	29
