= Happiness (Ai song) =

2011 single by Ai

- Original maxi single cover

Single by Ai

from the album Independent
- Language: Japanese; English
- A-side: "Letter in the Sky"
- Released: December 14, 2011
- Recorded: 2011
- Genre: R&B; christmas
- Length: 4:17
- Label: EMI Japan
- Songwriter: Ai Carina Uemura
- Producers: Uta; Ai

Ai singles chronology
"Stronger" (2010)	"Happiness" / "Letter in the Sky" (2011)	"Beautiful Life" (2012)

Music video
- "Happiness" on YouTube

Alternative cover
- 2013 international reissue cover

"Happiness" (ハピネス) is a song written and recorded by Japanese-American singer-songwriter Ai. Originally released digitally on November 18, 2011 as the second single from Ai's ninth studio album, Independent, it was released physically on December 14, 2011, by EMI Music Japan alongside "Letter in the Sky".

Used as a commercial theme song for Coca-Cola's Christmas campaign in Japan from 2011 to 2015, "Happiness" became one of Ai's best performing singles in the 2010s to date with 3 million digital downloads. In 2013, the single received a Platinum certification from the Recording Industry Association of Japan (RIAJ).

== Background and release ==
In October 2011, "Letter in the Sky" was released digitally as the lead single for Independent. With the release, it was announced the song would be released physically in December.

"Happiness" originally was released to Chaka-Uta, a digital transmission technology in Japan used to distribute ringtones and songs to Japanese mobile phones in November 2011. It later was released to other digital stores. On December 14, "Happiness" was released physically with "Letter in the Sky" as a double A-side single.

== Music videos ==
Three music videos were made for "Happiness" and its remixes. The original music video was released in December 2011. In the video, Ai portrays a janitor, a high school principal, and a salesman driving a Coca-Cola delivery truck. The video switches between the three characters she portrays. At the end of the music video, Ai is seen performing the song as herself with the students of the school.

In 2012, a music video for the "Smile Version" of "Happiness" was released. The music video was shot in Yokohama.

In 2013, a music video for the "Giving Version" of "Happiness" was released.

== Commercial performance ==
The physical release of "Happiness / Letter in the Sky" debuted at number 14 on the Oricon weekly singles chart. On the Billboard Japan charts, "Happiness" debuted at number 4 and peaked at number 2 on the Japan Hot 100. The physical single peaked at number 13 on the Top Singles Sales chart. "Happiness" appeared in many year-end rankings.

== Track listing ==
All tracks written and produced by Ai Uemura unless noted. All tracks produced by Uta unless noted.

"Happiness"– Digital single
No.	Title	Length
1.	"Happiness"	4:17

"Happiness / Letter in the Sky" – CD single
No.	Title	Writer(s)	Producer(s)	Length
1.	"Happiness"			4:15
2.	"Letter in the Sky" (featuring the Jacksons)	Uemura; Curtis Jenkins; Danny Lashine; King David "The Future"	King David; Uemura	4:43

"Happiness / Letter in the Sky" – DVD bonus
No.	Title	Length
1.	"Happiness" (music video)
2.	"Letter in the Sky" (music video) (featuring the Jacksons)
3.	"Legendary Night at Nippon Budokan with Super Special Guests" (Digest trailer)

Happiness EP – Digital EP
No.	Title	Writer(s)	Length
1.	"Happiness" (Smile version)		4:24
2.	"Happiness"		4:18
3.	"Happiness" (English version)	Uemura; Latisha Hyman	4:17
4.	"Happiness" (Mighty Crown Reggae Summer remix)		5:04
5.	"Happiness" (live in Budokan 2012)		5:29
6.	"Happiness" (karaoke mix)		4:18

Happiness Gift Pack – CD EP
No.	Title	Writer(s)	Length
1.	"Happiness"		4:18
2.	"Happiness" (Smile version)		4:24
3.	"Happiness" (Giving version)		4:16
4.	"Happiness" (English version)	Uemura; Hyman	4:18
5.	"Happiness" (Mighty Crown Reggae Summer remix)		5:04
6.	"Happiness" (karaoke mix)		4:18
7.	"Happiness" (Smile version, karaoke mix)		4:26
8.	"Happiness" (Giving version, karaoke mix)		4:16

Happiness Gift Pack – DVD bonus
No.	Title	Length
1.	"Happiness" (music video)
2.	"Happiness" (Smile version) (music video)
3.	"Happiness" (Giving version) (music video)
4.	"Happiness" (Giving version) (Behind the Scenes)

Happiness Pack – Digital EP
No.	Title	Writer(s)	Length
1.	"Happiness"		4:18
2.	"Happiness" (Smile version)		4:24
3.	"Happiness" (Giving version)		4:16
4.	"Happiness" (English version)	Uemura; Hyman	4:18
5.	"Happiness" (Mighty Crown Reggae Summer remix)		5:04

== Charts ==
=== Weekly charts ===
Chart performance for "Happiness"
Chart (2011–12)	Peak position
Japan Adult Contemporary Airplay (Billboard Japan)	1
Japan Hot 100 (Billboard Japan)	2
Japan Singles Chart (Oricon)	14
Japan Top Singles Sales (Billboard Japan)	13

Chart performance for "Happiness"
Chart (2013)	Peak position
Japan Albums Chart (Oricon) (Note: On Japanese charts, the Happiness Gift Pack was considered an album.)	139

=== Year-end charts ===
Year-end chart performance for "Happiness"
Chart (2012)	Peak position
Japan Adult Contemporary Airplay (Billboard Japan)	14
Japan Hot 100 (Billboard Japan)	5
Japan Radio Songs (Billboard Japan)	12

== Credits and personnel ==
Credits adapted from Tidal.

Original version

- Ai Uemura – vocals, songwriter, producer
- Uta – producer, programming, recording arranger

English version

- Ai Uemura – vocals, songwriter, producer
- Uta – producer, programming, recording arranger
- Latisha Hyman – songwriter

Reggae Summer remix

- Ai Uemura – vocals, songwriter, producer
- Uta – producer, programming, recording arranger
- Mighty Crown – arranger, work arranger
- Danny Bassic – bass (vocals)
- Kirk Drummie – drums
- Monti – guitar
- Deen Fraser – horn
- Devon – keyboards
- Sami-T – programming, recording arranger

== Certifications ==
Certifications and sales for "Happiness"
Region	Certification	Certified units/sales
Japan (RIAJ) PC download	2× Platinum	500,000^{*}
Japan (RIAJ) Full-length ringtone	Platinum	250,000^{*}
Streaming
Japan (RIAJ)	Gold	50,000,000^{†}
^{*} Sales figures based on certification alone.^{†} Streaming-only figures based on certification alone.

== Happiness (Gospel Version) ==
"Happiness (Gospel Version)"

Promotional single by Ai

from the album Kansha!!!!! - Thank You for 20 Years New and Best
- Language: Japanese; English
- Released: October 30, 2019
- Recorded: 2019
- Genre: R&B; gospel
- Length: 4:21
- Label: EMI; Universal
- Songwriter: Ai Uemura
- Producers: Gerald Haddon; Uemura

On October 30, 2019, Ai released a gospel version of "Happiness" as promotional single from her 2019 compilation album, Kansha!!!! - Thank You for 20 Years New and Best.

=== Background ===
To celebrate her twenty-year anniversary in the music industry and the then upcoming 2020 Summer Olympics, Ai traveled to Los Angeles, California to record new material, which later was revealed to be It's All Me, Vol. 1 (2020) and It's All Me, Vol. 2 (2021). While recording new material, Ai recorded gospel arrangements of her previously released hit singles.

=== Release history ===
Release history and formats for "Happiness (Gospel Version)"
Region	Date	Format(s)	Label	Ref.
Various	October 30, 2019	Digital download; streaming	EMI	

== Eito version ==
"Happiness"

Single by Eito
- Language: Japanese; English
- Released: November 11, 2020
- Recorded: 2020
- Length: 4:16
- Label: A.S.A.B
- Songwriter: Ai Uemura

Eito singles chronology
"Right Now" (2020)	"Happiness" (2020)	"Piece of Cake" (2021)

Japanese musician Eito covered "Happiness" for the Coca-Cola winter 2020 campaign. His cover was released on November 11, 2020, by A.S.A.B. His cover was included as a bonus track on his debut studio album, Sukkarakan.

=== Live performances ===
Eito performed the song live with Ai at the "Coca-Cola" Ribbon Bottle Happiness Night on December 10, 2020.

=== Release history ===
Release history and formats for "Happiness"
Region	Date	Format(s)	Label	Ref.
Various	November 11, 2020	Digital download; streaming	A.S.A.B	

== Release history ==
Release history and formats for "Happiness"
Region	Date	Format(s)	Version	Label	Ref.
Japan	November 23, 2011	Digital download	Original	EMI Music Japan	
Japan	December 14, 2011	Digital download; streaming; CD; DVD	Original	EMI Music Japan	
Japan	January 16, 2013	Digital download; streaming	EP	EMI Music Japan	
Japan	December 3, 2013	Digital download; streaming	Pack EP	EMI Records Japan	
Japan	December 11, 2013	CD; DVD	Gift Pack EP	EMI Records Japan	
Various	October 30, 2019	Digital download; streaming	EP	EMI	
Various	November 8, 2023	Digital download; streaming	Dolby Atmos mix	EMI	
Japan	February 26, 2025	7-inch vinyl	Vinyl (+ Reggae Summer remix)	EMI	
Various	February 28, 2025	7-inch vinyl	Vinyl (+ Reggae Summer remix)	EMI; Universal	

== See also ==
- List of best-selling singles in Japan
