= Wa to Yo =

2017 studio album by Ai

- Standard cover (Note: On the deluxe edition cover, the background is purple instead of red.)

Studio album by Ai
- Released: June 7, 2017
- Recorded: 2012–2013; 2016–2017
- Studio: Studio MSR (Tokyo, Japan); Studio Mech (Tokyo); Prime Sound (Tokyo); Victor Studio (Shibuya, Tokyo); NK Sound Tokyo; Universal Music Studios (Tokyo); DaCo-op Studios (Atlanta, Georgia)
- Genre: R&B; hip-hop; electropop; pop
- Length: 64:13
- Language: English; Japanese
- Label: EMI
- Producer: Uta; Julian Le; Gakushi; Alex Geringas; Don City; Derrick D. Beck; Ai; D. Clax; Black the Beast; Da Beatfreakz; Vakseen

Ai chronology
| The Feat. Best (2016) | Wa to Yo (2017) | Kansha!!!!! – Thank You for 20 Years New and Best (2019) |

Singles from Wa to Yo
- 1. "Justice Will Prevail at Last" Released: May 9, 2017; 2. "Kira Kira" Released: August 1, 2017

Wa to Yo (Japanese: 和と洋, Hepburn: Wa to Yō; lit. 'Japanese and Western') is the eleventh studio album by Japanese-American singer-songwriter Ai. It was released on June 7, 2017, through EMI Records, as a double album. Wanting to express both her American and Japanese background, Ai recorded the Wa disc in Japanese with traditional Japanese sensibilities while the Yo disc was recorded in English with R&B and hip-hop influences.

== Background ==
After the release of Moriagaro in 2013, Ai was engaged to Hiro, the leader and vocalist of the rock band Kaikigesshoku. The pair had been dating for 10 years, and wed in January 2014. In August 2015, Ai gave birth to her first child. In November 2015, EMI released a greatest hits album, The Best. A deluxe version was released in 2016.

Wa to Yo was first teased on Ai's YouTube channel on April 20, 2017.

== Development ==
The logo of the album, designed by Aries Moross

Wanting to "convey the goodness of Japan" to the rest of the world and "the goodness of the overseas to Japanese people", Ai collaborated with several producers, artists and songwriters from both Japan and the west coast. The album combines traditional Japanese instruments with modern western genres. Majority of the songs on the album were used in commercial tie-ins, such as "Feel It", which was used by Japanese fashion brand Global Work.

In a 2017 interview with The Japan Times, Ai explained Japanese record labels found her sound "too American" at the start of her career. She further added she loved "both (sides)" of her Japanese and American background equally. Regarding the lyricism of Wa to Yo, Ai described the Yo disc as "sexier, and has more love songs" compared to the Wa disc.

In an interview with her record label, Ai stated majority of the English songs from the Yo disc were recorded during her Atlantic City session, originally intended for her tenth studio album, Moriagaro.

== Release and promotion ==
The album was released on June 7, 2017. Unlike most physical releases in Japan, no first press editions bundles were included.

In promotion of the album, Ai embarked on the Wa to Yo Tour. A video album was released containing footage from the tour in June 2018.

=== Singles ===
Two singles were released from Wa to Yo. The lead single "Justice Will Prevail at Last" was released a month prior to the album's release. The song served as the theme song for the Japanese drama Emergency Interrogation Room. "Justice Will Prevail at Last" failed to enter Japanese charts until the release of Wa to Yo, debuting and peaking at number 74 on the Billboard Japan Hot 100. Within the same month of Wa to Yo being released, Ai announced she would be providing a new song featuring Japanese comedian Naomi Wantanabe for the Japanese comedy show Kanna-san!. The song, "Kira Kira", was later serviced to Japanese radio and released digitally shortly after. "Kira Kira" was a commercial success in Japan, peaking at number 19 on the Billboard Japan Hot 100 and being nominated for the Grand Prix award at the 59th Japan Record Awards.

== Critical reception ==
Patrick ST. Michel of the Japan Times gave Wa to Yo a positive review, noting how well the Wa and Yo disc connects "despite its two distinctive sides". He added that part of the Wa disc falls short when it "embraces a staple of J-pop – the ballad."

== Track listing ==
All tracks written by Ai Uemura except where noted.

Wa – disc one
| No. | Title | Writer(s) | Length |
|---|---|---|---|
| 1. | "Wa Interlude" (featuring Kodō & Jinmenusagi) | Ai Uemura; Riou Tomiyama | 2:46 |
| 2. | "Wonderful World" (featuring Himekami) | Uemura; Yoshiaki Hoshi | 3:55 |
| 3. | "From Zero" | | 4:22 |
| 4. | "Justice Will Prevail at Last" (最後は必ず正義が勝つ, Saigo wa Kanarazu Seigi ga Katsu) | | 4:05 |
| 5. | "Feel It" | | 3:11 |
| 6. | "I Can Pretend" | | 4:00 |
| 7. | "Gui Gui" (グイグイ) | | 3:02 |
| 8. | "Home" | | 3:59 |
| 9. | "It's Gonna Be All Right" | | 4:34 |
| 10. | "Music Is My Life" | | 6:07 |
| Total length: | | | 38:41 |

Yo – disc two
| No. | Title | Writer(s) | Length |
|---|---|---|---|
| 11. | "Yo Interlude" | | 2:00 |
| 12. | "Welcome to My City" (featuring Junior Reid & Eric Bellinger) | Uemura; Eric Bellinger; Issa; Junior Reid; Tyrone Wright; Victoria Kimani | 3:22 |
| 13. | "Right Now" (featuring Chris Brown) | Uemura; Arin Ray; Chris Brown; Derrick D. Beck; Donameche Jackson; Jamal Gaines; Joshua Berry; Vincent Berry | 2:56 |
| 14. | "What I Want" (featuring Jinmenusagi) | Uemura; Anthony Charles Williams II; Riou Tomiyama; Ty Steez; Vakseen | 3:00 |
| 15. | "Sweet Nothing's" | Alex Geringas; Samantha Nelson | 4:03 |
| 16. | "The One You Need" | Uemura; Latisha Hyman; Wright | 4:14 |
| 17. | "Crazy Love" | Uemura; David Claxton; Kimani | 4:15 |
| Total length: | | | 23:10 |

Deluxe edition

Wa – disc one
| No. | Title | Writer(s) | Length |
|---|---|---|---|
| 1. | "Wa Interlude" (featuring Kodō & Jinmenusagi) | Uemura; Tomiyama | 2:46 |
| 2. | "Wonderful World" (featuring Himekami) | Uemura; Hoshi | 3:55 |
| 3. | "From Zero" | | 4:22 |
| 4. | "Justice Will Prevail at Last" | | 4:05 |
| 5. | "Feel It" | | 3:11 |
| 6. | "I Can Pretend" | | 4:00 |
| 7. | "Gui Gui" | | 3:02 |
| 8. | "Home" | | 3:59 |
| 9. | "It's Gonna Be All Right" | | 4:34 |
| 10. | "Music Is My Life" | | 6:07 |
| 11. | "Heiwa" | Carlos Jenkins; Matthew Quinney; Obi Eble; Uche Eble; Uemura | 3:54 |
| 12. | "Miracle" (ミラクル) | | 3:38 |
| 13. | "I'm the Champion" | | 4:08 |
| 14. | "Run to the Sun" | | 3:38 |
| 15. | "Kira Kira" (キラキラ) (featuring Naomi Watanabe) | | 3:39 |
| 16. | "Happy Christmas" (ハッピークリスマス) | | 5:24 |
| Total length: | | | 61:42 |

Yo – disc two
| No. | Title | Writer(s) | Length |
|---|---|---|---|
| 1. | "Yo Interlude" | | 2:00 |
| 2. | "Welcome to My City" (featuring Junior Reid & Eric Bellinger) | Uemura; Bellinger; Issa; Reid; Wright; Kimani | 3:22 |
| 3. | "Right Now" (featuring Chris Brown) | Uemura; Ray; Brown; Beck; Jackson; Gaines; J. Berry; V. Berry | 2:56 |
| 4. | "What I Want" (featuring Jinmenusagi) | Uemura; Williams II; Jinmenusagi; Steez; Vakseen | 3:00 |
| 5. | "Sweet Nothing's" | Geringas; Nelson | 4:03 |
| 6. | "The One You Need" | Uemura; Hyman; Wright | 4:14 |
| 7. | "Crazy Love" | Uemura; Claxton; Kimani | 4:15 |
| 8. | "Little Hero" | Uemura; Lynne Hobday | 3:47 |
| Total length: | | | 26:57 |

=== Notes ===
- The deluxe reissue of Wa to Yo is titled Wa to Yo to.
- "Wonderful World" samples "Kamigami no Uta" by Himekami.
- Tracks 4, 7, 12, 15, and 16 are titled in Japanese.
- Tracks 5, 8, 9 and 11 of disc two are stylized in all upper case lettering.
- Tracks 4 and 7 of disc two are stylized in all upper case lettering.

== Charts ==
Chart performance for Wa to Yo
| Chart (2017) | Peak position |
|---|---|
| Japanese Albums (Oricon) | 11 |
| Japanese Digital Albums (Oricon) | 21 |
| Japanese Hot Albums (Billboard Japan) | 19 |

== Credits and personnel ==
Credits adapted from album's liner notes.

- Ai Carina Uemura – lead vocals, songwriting, producer
- Uta – producer, songwriting
- Julian Le – producer, songwriting
- Gakushi – producer, songwriting
- Da Beatfreakz – producer
- Tha Gutbangaz – co–producer
- Taji Okuda – vocal editing
- Chris Brown – featured artist, songwriting
- Eric Bellinger – featured artist, songwriting
- Junior Reid – featured artist, songwriting
- Jinmenusagi – featured artist, songwriting
- Himekami – featured artist, sound production, songwriting
- Victoria Emily Hogan Marshal – songwriting
- Matthew "Damario" Quinney – songwriting
- Carlos "Los" Jenkins – songwriting
- Uche Ben Eble – songwriting
- Obi Fred Eble – songwriting
- Keisuke Fujimaki – vocal editing
- Yoshinori Morita – vocal editing
- Satoshi Yoneda – vocal editing
- Sayaka Ogoshi – vocal editing
- Tomoe Nishikawa – vocal editing
- Black the Beast – producer, vocal editing, mixing
- Don City – producer, vocal editor, mixing
- Neeraj Khajanchi – vocal editing
- Hitoshi Sato – vocal editing
- D.O.I – mixing
- Tyrone Wright – songwriting
- Victoria Kimani – songwriting
- Issa – songwriting
- Derrick D. Beck – songwriting, producer
- Arin Ray – songwriting
- Vincent Berry – songwriting
- Joshua Berry – songwriting
- Jamal Gaines – songwriting
- Anthony Charles Williams II – songwriting
- Ty Steez – songwriting
- Vakseen – songwriting, producer
- Alex Geringas – songwriting, producer
- Samantha Nelson – songwriting
- Latisha Hyman – songwriting
- David Claxton – songwriting
- Lynne Hobday – songwriting
- Donameche Jackson – songwriting
- Seiichi Watanabe – A&R (EMI Records)
- Daisuke Fujikawa – marketing
- Yoko Tsunashima – marketing
- Kimiko Kato – sales promotion (Universal)
- Kotaro Suzuki – media promotion
- Norio Eguchi – media promotion
- Mika Mitsumochi – media promotion
- Masayoshi Abe – media promotion
- Mitsuru Sekiya – media promotion
- Rie Deguchi – media promotion
- Sae Yamamoto – media promotion
- Takeshi Okada – digital & web promotion
- Sayaka Abe – digital & web promotion
- Yoshiaki Ando – digital & web promotion
- Mina Hosojima – digital & web promotion
- Runa Hayasaka – digital & web promotion
- Takeshi Okada – digital & web promotion
- Yuka Tsukada – digital production
- Yuka Sato – digital production
- Masao Eto – area promotion
- Shintaro Ishihara – area promotion
- Sayoko Okuno – legal
- Yukari Kuwahara – legal
- Aiichiro Kiyohara – UM & brands
- Nobuo Kobayashi – UM & brands
- Akihito Watanabe – master localization
- Taku Nakamura – project producer
- Naoshi Fujikura – supervisor
- Koichi Sakakibara – manager
- Yuki Arai – executive producer
- Kate Moross – art director
- Ina Jang – photographer
- Akemi Ono – makeup artist, hair artist
- Noriko Goto – stylist
- Risa Nakazawa – visual coordinator
- Shuma Saito – package coordinator
- Akio Kawabata – package coordinator
- Randy Merrill – mastering
- Tom Coyne – mastering

== Release history ==
Release history and formats for Wa to Yo
| Region | Date | Format(s) | Version | Label | Ref. |
|---|---|---|---|---|---|
| Various | June 7, 2017 | Digital download; streaming | Standard | EMI; Universal | |
| Japan | June 7, 2017 | CD | Standard | EMI; Universal Japan; Def Jam | |
| Various | October 25, 2017 | Digital download; streaming | Deluxe | EMI; Universal | |
| Japan | October 25, 2017 | CD | Deluxe | EMI; Universal Japan; Def Jam | |
