= Summer Magic =

Summer Magic may refer to:

- Summer Magic (film), a 1963 Walt Disney Productions family musical film
- Summer Magic (EP), an EP by Red Velvet
- Summer Magic (song), a song by Ai
- Summer Magic, a 1994 set of Magic: The Gathering cards
