= It's All Me, Vol. 2 =

2021 extended play by Ai

- Digital cover (Note: On physical releases, the catalog number is present below the title of the EP.)

EP by Ai
- Released: February 24, 2021
- Recorded: 2019
- Studio: Black Star Music (Studio City, California); Studio MSR (Tokyo, Japan); MSR Lab (Tokyo)
- Genre: J-pop; R&B; hip hop
- Length: 21:24
- Language: Japanese; English
- Label: EMI
- Producer: Ai Uemura; Avedon; Scott Storch; Julian Le; Blaq Tuxedo; Bernard "Harv" Harvey; Matt Cab; Toma

Ai chronology
It's All Me, Vol. 1 (2020)	It's All Me, Vol. 2 (2021)	Dream (2022)

Singles from It's All Me, Vol. 2
- 1. "Not So Different" Released: November 25, 2020

It's All Me, Vol. 2 is the second extended play by Japanese-American singer-songwriter Ai. It was released on February 24, 2021, through EMI Records, as a follow-up to It's All Me, Vol. 1 (2020). Ai primarily collaborated with western producers and longtime collaborator Julian Le.

The lead and only single "Not So Different" was released in November 2020 with a remix release featuring Awich in December 2020. "Hope" was released in January 2021 as a promotional single.

== Background and release ==
When I [wrote Not So Different], I hadn't decided to put this song on "Volume two" [...] At that time, the Black Lives Matter movement expanded, and [I] decided to put [it] out now. I always want[ed] to send a message like this, but often I can't put out a song unless the timing is right.

— Ai reflecting on including "Not So Different" on It's All Me, Vol. 2

Celebrating her twenty-year anniversary in the music industry, Ai released a greatest hits album, Kansha!!!!! – Thank You for 20 Years New and Best in November 2019 and an extended play, It's All Me, Vol. 1 in July 2020.

The EP's first single, "Not So Different" was released on November 25, 2020, with its music video premiering on the same day. In December 2020, Ai partnered with One Young World and released a special music video of the song in support of the project. A remix of "Not So Different" featuring Japanese rapper Awich was released on December 11, 2020, as a promotional single. The second single, "Hope" was released on January 30, 2021 with its music video premiering the same day. Ai partnered with deleteC, a non-profit organization in Japan aiming to support cancer treatment. A music video of the "Not So Different" remix was released on February 20, 2021, a few days prior to the EP's release on February 24.

== Track listing ==
It's All Me, Vol. 2 track listing
No.	Title	Writer(s)	Producer(s)	Length
1.	"Not So Different"	Ai Uemura; Rachel West; Vincent Van den Ende; Scott Storch	Uemura; Avedon; Storch	3:41
2.	"Jump"	Uemura	Uemura; Julian Le	3:56
3.	"Off You"	Uemura; Darius Logan; Domonique Logan; Michael Jiminez	Blaq Tuxedo	2:55
4.	"Expectations"	Uemura; Fallon King; Felisha "Fury" King	Bernard "Harv" Harvey	3:05
5.	"Hope"	Uemura	Uemura; Matt Cab; Toma	4:05
6.	"Not So Different" (Remix featuring Awich)	Uemura; West; Akiko Urasaki; Ende; Storch	Uemura; Avedon; Storch	3:42
Total length:				21:24

It's All Me, Vol. 2 – limited edition DVD bonus
No.	Title	Director(s)	Length
1.	"Not So Different"	Kensaku Kakimoto	3:41
2.	"Not So Different" (Behind the Scenes)	Kakimoto
3.	"Gift"	Kakimoto	3:38
4.	"Gift" (Behind the Scenes)	Kakimoto
5.	"Kokoro" (featuring Jenn Morel and Joelii) (lyric video)	Hideyuki Ishii	3:18

== Personnel ==
Credits adapted from album's liner notes and Tidal.

=== Musicians ===
- Ai Carina Uemura – lead vocals, songwriting, production
- Julian Le – production
- Felisha "Fury" King – songwriting
- Fallon King – songwriting
- Bernard "Harv" Harvey – production
- Scott Storch – production, songwriting
- Blaq Tuxedo – production, songwriting
- Avedon – production, songwriting, remixing
- Rachel West – songwriting
- Akiko Urasaki – songwriting, featured artist
- Matt Cab – production
- Toma – production

=== Technical ===
- D.O.I – mixing
- Mark Parfitt – vocal engineering
- Randy Merrill – mastering
- Keisuke Fujimaki – vocal engineering
- Kesiuke Suwa – vocal engineering
- Shiori Maruoka – vocal engineering
- Yuki Arai – executive producer
- Naoshi Fujikura – executive producer

=== Visuals and imagery ===
- Ran Tondabayahsi – art director
- Yousuke Tsuchida – designer
- Hiroki Watanabe – photographer
- Moemi Odo – retouching
- Akemi Ono – hair, makeup artist
- Noriko Gota – stylist
- Akio Kawabata – design coordination
- Shuma Saito – design coordination

== Chart performance ==
It's All Me, Vol. 2 debuted and peaked at number 47 on the Japan Oricon weekly albums chart, charting for two weeks.

Chart performance for It's All Me, Vol. 2
Chart (2021)	Peak position
Japanese Albums (Oricon)	47
Japanese Digital Albums (Oricon)	50
Japanese Hot Albums (Billboard Japan)	52

== Release history ==
Release history and formats for It's All Me, Vol. 2
Region	Date	Format(s)	Version	Label	Ref.
Various	February 24, 2021	Digital download; streaming	Standard	EMI; Universal	
Japan	February 24, 2021	CD	Standard	EMI; Universal Japan; Def Jam	
Japan	February 24, 2021	CD; DVD	Limited	EMI; Universal Japan; Def Jam	
