= Naomi Watanabe =

Japanese actress and comedian (born 1987)

- 渡辺 直美
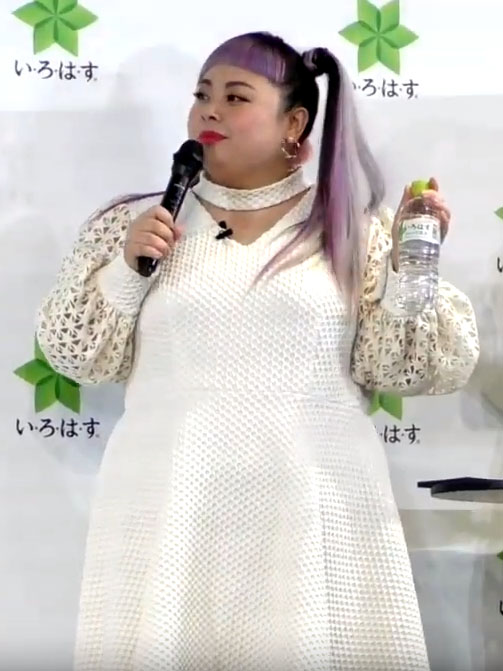
- Naomi Watanabe in 2010
- Born: Naomi Watanabe; 23 October 1987 (age 39); Banqiao City, Taipei County, Taiwan
- Occupations: Comedian; actress; fashion designer
- Years active: 2007–present
- Hometown: Ishioka, Ibaraki Prefecture, Japan
- Height: 1.57 m (5 ft 2 in)
- Musical career
- Genres: Comedy; J-pop
- Instrument: Vocals
- Label: Yoshimoto Kogyo
- Member of: N-choco

Naomi Watanabe (渡辺 直美, Watanabe Naomi; born 23 October 1987) is a Japanese comedian, actress, and fashion designer. She rose to fame in 2008 for her imitation of Beyoncé, after which she was given the title "the Japanese Beyoncé".

== Biography ==
Watanabe was born in Taipei to a Japanese father and a Taiwanese mother. The family moved to Japan shortly after her birth and she was raised in Ibaraki . She is an only child. Her parents divorced when she was very young. During that time, Watanabe recalls what living in poverty was like, especially when she was five or six years old; her mother struggled to find stable work because she was a foreigner and could barely understand the Japanese language. Her mother later remarried when Watanabe was eight years old. She also shared that her mother's new husband was only interested in her mother and did not care much about her, so she often felt lonely as a child.

== Career ==
Watanabe does impersonations of popular artists in Japanese culture, among which her imitation of Beyoncé singing "Dreamgirls" and "Crazy in Love" became popular. She has launched her own fashion line called Punyus (loosely translated to "chubby" in English), and played the role of Mabel in the musical Fame and Tracy Turnblad in the musical Hairspray.

Watanabe made her musical debut in 2017, as a featured artist on Japanese-American singer Ai's single "Kira Kira". The song served as the opening theme song for the Japanese drama Kanna-san!, with Watanabe as the lead actress. "Kira Kira" was nominated for the Grand Prix Award at the 59th Japan Record Awards.

In 2022, she appeared as a featured artist on a Japanese remix of Doja Cat's 2021 single "Kiss Me More".

In 2025, Watanabe and the comic duo Chocolate Planet formed N-choco. They released their debut single "Elusive" with M-Flo.

=== Guest appearances ===
Watanabe appeared as a guest in the 2013 anime movie Crayon Shin-chan: Very Tasty! B-class Gourmet Survival!!. In 2016, she voiced the character of Ashima in the Japanese language dub of the Thomas & Friends film The Great Race. In 2019, she was featured in Queer Eye: We're in Japan!, Season 1, Episode 3, "The Ideal Woman". She has appeared in Us Weekly magazine.

== Personal life ==
In March 2021, she announced she would move from Japan to the United States. Watanabe relocated to New York City, describing it as a "major rebirth".

== Awards ==
In December 2024, Naomi Watanabe was included on the BBC's 100 Women list.

== Discography ==
=== Singles ===
==== As a featured artist ====
List of singles as a featured artist, showing select chart positions and associated albums
| Title | Year | Peak chart positions | Album |
| Title | Year | JPN Hot 100 (Note: Sources for chart positions: "Kira Kira") | Album |
|---|---|---|---|
| "Kira Kira" (Ai featuring Naomi Watanabe) | 2017 | 19 | Wa to Yo |
| "Kiss Me More" (Doja Cat featuring Naomi Watanabe) | 2022 | — | Non-album single |
| "Gods' Play" (Kento Nakajima featuring Naomi Watanabe) | 2026 | — | Idol1st |
"—" denotes items that did not chart.

== Filmography ==
=== Variety shows ===
| Year | Title | Network | Notes | Ref(s) |
|---|---|---|---|---|
| 2010–2014 | Waratte Iitomo! | Fuji TV | | |
| 2011 | Saturday Night Live Japan | Fuji TV | | |
| 2023 | Takeshi's Castle (2023) | | | |

=== Film ===
| Year | Title | Role | Notes | Ref(s) |
|---|---|---|---|---|
| 2012 | Tug of War! | | | |
| 2013 | R100 | | | |
| 2018 | Sunny: Our Hearts Beat Together | Ume | | |
| 2020 | The Untold Tale of the Three Kingdoms | Diaochan | | |
| 2020 | The Promised Neverland | Krone | | |

=== Television drama ===
| Year | Title | Role | Notes | Ref(s) |
|---|---|---|---|---|
| 2011 | Deka Wanko | | | |
| 2011 | Yūsha Yoshihiko | | | |
| 2014 | A Time of Love | | | |
| 2016 | The Hiddens | | | |
| 2019 | Queer Eye | Guest | | |
| 2020 | Followers | | | |
| 2025 | Omusubi | Akipi | Asadora | |

=== Animation ===
| Year | Title | Role | Type | Notes | Ref(s) |
|---|---|---|---|---|---|
| 2007 | Sazae-san | | TV | | |
| 2013 | Crayon Shin-chan: Very Tasty! B-class Gourmet Survival!! | | Film | | |
| 2015 | Chibi Maruko-chan: A Boy from Italy | | Film | | |
| 2020 | Doraemon: Nobita's New Dinosaur | Natalie | Film | | |
| 2021 | Pretty Guardian Sailor Moon Eternal The Movie | Zirconia | 2-Part film | Season 4 of Sailor Moon Crystal | |
| 2022 | Deemo: Memorial Keys | Sachet | Film | | |
| 2025 | Elio | Ambassador Auva | Film | English and Japanese versions | |

=== Japanese dub ===
Live-action

| Year | Title | Role | Voice dub for | Notes | Ref(s) |
|---|---|---|---|---|---|
| 2015 | Night at the Museum: Secret of the Tomb | Tilly | Rebel Wilson | | |
| 2015 | Pixels | Serena Williams | | | |
| 2016 | Ghostbusters | Dr. Abigail L. "Abby" Yates | Melissa McCarthy | | |
| 2018 | I Feel Pretty | Renee Bennett | Amy Schumer | | |
| 2022 | Ghostbusters: Afterlife | Gozer / Mini Marshmallow Man | | | |
| 2025 | Wednesday | Rosaline Rotwood | Lady Gaga | | |

Animation

| Year | Title | Role | Voice dub for | Notes | Ref(s) |
|---|---|---|---|---|---|
| 2016 | Thomas & Friends: The Great Race | Ashima | Tina Desai | | |
| 2017 | Coco | Frida Kahlo | Natalia Cordova-Buckley | | |
| 2022 | Minions: The Rise of Gru | Master Chow | Michelle Yeoh | | |

== Notes ==
1. Sources for chart positions:
  - "Kira Kira"
