= Chad Knight =

American artist and skateboarder

- Born: November 8, 1976 (age 49); Portland, Oregon, U.S.
- Education: MiraCosta College
- Known for: 3D installations and professional skateboarding
- Notable work: Golden Rose, Abandoned Potential
- Movement: Contemporary Art
- Website: www.chad-knight.com

Chad Knight (born 1976) is an American contemporary artist and professional skateboarder based in Portland, Oregon.

== Life ==
Knight is a native of Westerville, Ohio and an alumnus of the MiraCosta College. Knight is now a resident of Portland, Oregon.

== Skateboarding career ==
Chad Knight became a professional skateboarder in around 1996 and was part of several different skateboarding teams including H-Street, Maple team, Osiris Crew and 1031. He also worked as a skateboard coach, training amateur skateboarders in the U.S. and Japan.

Knight competed as a professional skateboarder on American Gladiators and also appeared on The Guide by Scion as a guest.

== Visual art ==
After retiring from professional skateboarding, Knight began working as a designer for different brands including Vans, DC Shoes and Nike. Starting in 2013, Knight created digital artwork designed in 3D programs exploring contemporary architecture, engineering and sculpture. Natural landscapes and femininity also play a reoccurring role throughout his works. Knight was influenced by Renaissance and Baroque artists such as Claudio Coello, Peter Paul Rubens, and Caravaggio as well as contemporary digital artists including Virgil Abloh and Archan Nair, among others.

In September 2018, his Rose Gold installation was popularized by Lindsay Lohan when she posted the image on her Instagram. Knight is the head of the 3D design division at Nike.

== Selected works and exhibitions ==
- Cover art for Doja Cat's Kiss Me More single (2021)
- Abandoned Potential (Love on the Brain Exhibition, 2021)
- Wild Life, The White Room Gallery (Bridgehampton, March - April, 2021)
- Gaia awakens (Museum of Digital Art)
- Business Man of The Apocalypse (Fusion Art, 2018)
- Marcel Katz Art Exhibition (2018)
