= Kiss Me More =

2021 single by Doja Cat featuring SZA

Single by Doja Cat featuring SZA

from the album Planet Her
- B-side: "Streets"
- Released: April 9, 2021
- Recorded: September 2020
- Genre: Bubblegum pop; dance-pop; pop rap; R&B
- Length: 3:28
- Label: Kemosabe; RCA
- Songwriters: Amala Dlamini; Solána Rowe; David Sprecher; Rogét Chahayed; Gerard A. Powell; Carter Lang; Lukasz Gottwald; Stephen Kipner; Terry Shaddick
- Producers: Yeti Beats; Rogét Chahayed; Tizhimself; Carter Lang

Doja Cat singles chronology
"Streets" (2021)	"Kiss Me More" (2021)	"Dick" (2021)

SZA singles chronology
"Good Days" (2020)	"Kiss Me More" (2021)	"I Hate U" (2021)

Music video
- "Kiss Me More" on YouTube

"Kiss Me More" is a song by American rapper and singer Doja Cat featuring American singer-songwriter SZA from the former's third studio album Planet Her (2021). It was released on April 9, 2021, as the album's lead single through Kemosabe and RCA Records. "Kiss Me More" was written by the artists alongside producers Yeti Beats and Rogét Chahayed, as well as Tizhimself and Carter Lang, who both provided additional production, and Lukasz Gottwald. It has been described as a disco and rap influenced pop song.

As it interpolates the melody of the chorus from Olivia Newton-John's 1981 single "Physical", additional co-writing credits on the track go to Steve Kipner and Terry Shaddick. "Kiss Me More" met a huge commercial success, peaking atop in New Zealand, Mexico, Malaysia and Singapore, and reached the top five in eighteen countries including Norway, the United Kingdom and the United States, top twenty in the Netherlands, Czech Republic, Slovakia, Belgium, Iceland, Portugal, Switzerland, Sweden, Austria and Hungary and top forty in France, Panama, Germany and Brazil. It is also the longest-running all-female top 10 hit in American chart history. It is certified Diamond in France and Multiplatinum in twelve additional countries, including five-times Platinum in the US. The song won the Grammy Award for Best Pop Duo/Group Performance (becoming both Doja and SZA's first Grammy wins) and was also nominated for Record of the Year and Song of the Year.

== Background ==
Doja Cat released her second studio album, Hot Pink, in November 2019. The album spawned seven singles, including "Juicy", "Say So", and "Streets". "Juicy" gave Doja Cat her first entry into Billboard's US Hot 100 chart. It then went viral on the video-hosting application TikTok, where it served as background music for several Internet dance challenge clips. Aided by their popularity in TikTok, "Say So" and "Streets" became her first songs to top the US Hot 100 and reach the top 10 of the Billboard Global 200, respectively.

Looking back at the success of Hot Pink, staff writers at Billboard observed that Doja Cat had the "innate ability" to produce hit singles, and argued that she was becoming a "quintessential [Generation] Z pop star". After the album had performed great on the charts, the senior staff at Doja Cat's record label, RCA, believed that they needed to release a good follow-up song that would attain Internet-driven commercial success just like her previous singles. Such a song turned out to be "Kiss Me More", featuring American singer-songwriter SZA.

In early January 2021, Doja Cat revealed that her upcoming studio album features numerous guest appearances, including SZA. On March 5, 2021, SZA first mentioned "Kiss Me More" during an interview with V. She revealed that the song was "a different strut and I'm just excited", while Doja Cat replied by praising SZA, saying "I commend artists, like you, who stick to something". On April 8, 2021, Doja Cat took to social media to reveal the cover art and announce the release of the song for April 9. In an interview with Zane Lowe for Apple Music, she said: "I wanted to make a song about kissing. I just thought it would be cute. That doesn't happen too often, but just a song that's solely about kissing."

== Composition ==
"Kiss Me More" is a pop, pop rap, bubblegum pop, dance-pop and R&B song largely influenced by disco. It is composed in 4/4 time and the key of A-flat major, with a moderately fast tempo of 111 beats per minute (BPM) and a chord progression of B♭m^{7}–E♭^{7}–A♭maj^{7}–D♭maj^{7}. Doja Cat opens the song with vocals that recall "the gentle airiness of a light breeze", before two crashes of cymbals "act like glue" as they precede the beat drop. The song is "bolstered" by a "sunny, glimmering riff" and both singing and rap verses which critics noted to spotlight Doja Cat as equal parts singer and rapper. It is distinguishable by its slightly distorted signature guitar lead. Lyrical themes include "romance, passion, bold sexual desires, and tenderness all at once". The song's chorus interpolates the melody from Olivia Newton-John's "Physical", for which songwriters Steve Kipner and Terry Shaddick are also credited as co-writers.

== Critical reception ==
"Kiss Me More" received critical acclaim. Some critics drew resemblance between the song and Doja Cat's breakthrough 2020 hit "Say So". Jon Caramanica of The New York Times wrote that it "mixes the breeze of lite 1980s funk with the bawdiness of 2020s hip-hop, a juggling act that Doja Cat has pioneered, if not trademarked, by now." Justin Cutro of Vulture described it as "a silky, playful R&B jam", while writers at Rolling Stone deemed it a "groovy, disco-inflected jam". Heran Mamo of Billboard wrote that "the slinky, sensual jam will definitely be a summer playlist staple with its groovy bass line". Writing for Nylon, Steffanee Wang described the song as "a mid-tempo pop number with guitar and sticky melodies". Writing for Teen Vogue, Claire Dodson described the song as "excellent" and "a shimmering ode to kissing [...] with a somewhat melancholy underlying melody that contrasts well with that signature soft-disco Doja beat." Anders Hare of Rated R&B wrote that the "sunkissed, bouncy tune [...] features both musical prowesses sensually crooning about embracing the now with their significant others." Doja Cat and SZA's vocals were described as "smooth", "sultry" and "evocative". Jason Lipshutz of Billboard praised the duo's delivery and noted that they "keep their rhymes tight and chorus vocals breathy, but don't mince words". Both the song and its accompanying music video received all-round praise for its dreaminess and sensuality.

Complex ranked "Kiss Me More" seventh on its mid-year list of the best songs of 2021 and named it one of the most "infectious" songs of the year. Describing it as "light and uptempo" and deeming it "a masterclass in disco-adjacent pop music", they praised Doja Cat's "terrific job balancing singing and rapping over a catchy riff" with her "snappy flow" and "tongue-in-cheek punchlines". Insider crowned "Kiss Me More" the best song on Planet Her and hailed it as "easily one of the best songs released [in 2021]" since "every moment of this song is disarming and brilliant." Brandon Yu of Mic deemed it "the most refined showcase of her many talents thus far". In an album review for Consequence, Carys Anderson agreed that the song "sums up every layer of Doja Cat’s complex celebrity" with its infectious guitar line and chanted refrain, ultimately making it "a summery summation" of the "hyper-feminine, hyper-sexual, hyper-futuristic aesthetic" of Planet Her.

== Accolades ==
"Kiss Me More" has won 16 awards, including one Grammy Award from three nominations, one MTV Video Music Award from two nominations, one Billboard Music Award from three nominations, one iHeartRadio Music Award from five nominations , (Note: including iHeartRadio Titanium Awards) one MTV Europe Music Award from three nominations, one Clio Award and one Spotify One Billion Streams Plaque. It also has been nominated for one NAACP Image Award, one Brit Award, two BET Awards, one People's Choice Award and one Soul Train Music Award.

Kiss Me More awards and nominations
Awards and nominations
Award	Wins	Nominations
Grammy Awards	1	3
Billboard Music Awards	1	3
American Music Awards	1	2
MTV Video Music Awards	1	2
iHeartRadio Music Awards (Note: Including iHeartRadio Titanium Awards.)	1	5
NAACP Image Awards	0	1
Clio Awards	1	1
MTV Europe Music Awards	1	3
BMI Pop Music Awards	1	1
BMI Pop Music Awards	1	1
ASCAP Music Awards (Note: ASCAP Pop Music Awards and ASCAP Rhythm & Soul Music Awards.)	2	2

Totals (Note: Certain award groups do not simply award one winner. They acknowledge several different recipients, have runners-up, and have third place. Since this is a specific recognition and is different from losing an award, runner-up mentions are considered wins in this award tally. For simplification and to avoid errors, each award in this list has been presumed to have had a prior nomination.)
- Wins: 15
- Nominations: 42

Awards and nominations for "Kiss Me More"
Ceremony	Year	Award	Result	Ref.
American Music Awards	2021	Collaboration of the Year	Won	
American Music Awards	2021	Favorite Pop/Rock Song	Nominated	
ASCAP Pop Music Awards	2022	Most Performed Songs of the Year	Won	
ASCAP Rhythm & Soul Music Awards	2023	Most Performed Songs of the Year	Won	
BET Awards	2022	Video of the Year	Nominated	
BET Awards	2022	Best Collaboration	Nominated	
Billboard Music Awards	2022	Top Hot 100 Song	Nominated	
Billboard Music Awards	2022	Top Collaboration	Nominated	
Billboard Music Awards	2022	Top Viral Song	Won	
BMI Pop Music Awards	2022	Most-Performed Songs of the Year	Won	
BRIT Awards	2022	International Song of the Year	Nominated	
Bulletin Awards	2021	Single of the Year	Nominated	
Bulletin Awards	2021	Collaboration of the Year	Nominated	
Bulletin Awards	2021	Song of the Summer	Won	
Bulletin Awards	2021	Music Video of the Year	Nominated	
Clio Music Awards	2022	Film/Video (Music Marketing – Music Video)	Bronze	
Grammy Awards	2022	Record of the Year	Nominated	
Grammy Awards	2022	Song of the Year	Nominated	
Grammy Awards	2022	Best Pop Duo/Group Performance	Won	
Hit FM Music Awards	2022	Collaboration of the Year	Nominated	
Hit FM Music Awards	2022	Top 10 Singles of the Year	Nominated	
iHeartRadio Music Awards	2022	Song of the Year	Nominated	
iHeartRadio Music Awards	2022	Best Music Video	Nominated	
iHeartRadio Music Awards	2022	Best Collaboration	Nominated	
iHeartRadio Music Awards	2022	TikTok Bop of the Year	Nominated	
iHeartRadio Music Titanium Awards	2023	One Billion Total Spins on iHeartRadio Stations	Won	
Joox Thailand Music Awards	2022	International Song of the Year	Nominated	
MTV Europe Music Awards	2021	Best Song	Nominated	
MTV Europe Music Awards	2021	Best Video	Nominated	
MTV Europe Music Awards	2021	Best Collaboration	Won	
MTV Millennial Awards	2021	Global Hit of the Year	Nominated	
MTV Millennial Awards Brazil	2021	International Collaboration	Nominated	
MTV Video Play Awards	2021	Top 20 Music Videos	Won	
MTV Video Music Awards	2021	Video of the Year	Nominated	
MTV Video Music Awards	2021	Best Collaboration	Won	
NAACP Image Awards	2022	Outstanding Duo, Group or Collaboration (Traditional)	Nominated	
People's Choice Awards	2021	Collaboration of the Year	Nominated	
Soul Train Music Awards	2021	Best Collaboration	Nominated	
Spotify Plaques	2022	One Billion Total Streams on Spotify	Won	
The Daily Californian's Arts Awards	2021	Song of the Year	Won	
The Daily Californian's Arts Awards	2021	Best Collaboration	Won	
Urban Music Awards	2021	Best Collaboration	Nominated	

=== Rankings ===
"Kiss Me More" appeared on many mid-year best-of lists, with several critics identifying it as one best songs of the year so far. The following is a selected list of publications.

Critical rankings for "Kiss Me More"
Publication	Accolade	Rank	Ref.
Amazon Music	Best Songs of 2021	1	
Apple Music	The 100 Best Songs of 2021	5	
The A.V. Club	The 20 best songs of 2021	4	
Billboard	The 50 Best Songs of 2021	13	
Complex	The 50 Best Songs of 2021	5	
Cosmopolitan	15 Best Summer Songs of 2021	2	
NME	The 50 best songs of 2021	16	
NPR	The 100 Best Songs of 2021	63	
Pitchfork	The 100 Best Songs of 2021	35	
Spin	The 30 Best Songs Of 2021	3	
Uproxx	The Best Songs Of 2021	Placed	

== Music video ==
Doja Cat (right, next to SZA) plays a video game mimicking the seductive journey towards the aliens' lair on Planet Her, which has a display of trapped male astronauts in the background.

The music video was filmed throughout the week of March 15–19, 2021, directed by Warren Fu. It premiered the same day as the single. It features an astronaut (played by American actor Alex Landi) who crash-lands and explores the fictional "Planet Her", where Doja Cat and SZA portray seductive aliens who "provide soulful ambiance to his journey." At the end, he wakes up in a glass tube displayed among a collection of other men who have tried to explore the planet before him.

Emlyn Travis of MTV News praised the music video, describing Planet Her as "a mysterious, flourishing world filled with glittering oases, calming zen gardens, pastel sunset skies, and blossoming cherry trees that is ruled by two larger-than-life queens". Meaghan Garvey of Billboard noted that the video is "bathed in pastel hues and high-femme futurism, and while it's over-the-top sexy, it still ends with Doja and SZA cracking each other up while playing a video game in a galaxy far, far away." Erica Gonzales of Harper's Bazaar described the video as a "fantastical" one that "only their creative minds could pull off." Jem Aswad of Variety deemed it "trippy", while Jackson Langford of NME described it as "sensual sci-fi". Mekishana Pierre of Entertainment Tonight noted that it was "as playful and sugary-sweet as the track itself". Trishna Rikhy of V wrote: "A celestial visual and sonic experience, the hints of surrealism Doja Cat constantly threads through her videos still lingers". John Wohlmacher of Beats Per Minute noted that the fact that these "playful goddesses" were more interested in videogames than men shows just how clever the thematic approach to Planet Her was.

== Live performances ==
Doja Cat performed a solo version of "Kiss Me More" for the first time at Triller's inaugural Fight Club event in April 2021. Doja Cat and SZA performed the song together at the 2021 Billboard Music Awards in May 2021. Doja Cat again performed a solo version of the song within a medley at the 2021 iHeartRadio Music Awards later that month. During a solo virtual concert as part of American Express's "Unstaged" campaign, SZA performed her verse from the song as well as the chorus usually sung by Doja Cat. She performed it in the same manner during a solo virtual concert as part of Grey Goose's "In Dream" campaign. Doja Cat also included the song in the setlist for her The Scarlet Tour and SZA did the same for her SOS Tour. SZA covered the song again in 2025 during the Grand National Tour, which she co-headlined with rapper Kendrick Lamar. The performance included elements of "Kiss" (1986) by singer Prince, concluding with the single's distinctive guitar riff.

== Track listing ==
Target exclusive 4" vinyl single

Side A

1. "Kiss Me More" (featuring SZA) – 3:28

Side B

1. "Streets" – 3:46

== Credits and personnel ==
Credits adapted from Tidal and the Planet Her liner notes.

- Doja Cat – lead vocals, songwriting
- SZA – featured artist, songwriting
- Yeti Beats – songwriting, production
- Rogét Chahayed – songwriting, production
- Tizhimself – songwriting, additional production
- Carter Lang – songwriting, additional production
- Lukasz Gottwald – songwriting
- Stephen Kipner – songwriting, interpolation
- Terry Shaddick – songwriting, interpolation
- Joe Visciano – engineering
- John Hanes – engineering
- Serban Ghenea – mixing
- Mike Bozzi – mastering
- Chad Knight – cover art

== Charts ==
=== Weekly charts ===
Chart performance for "Kiss Me More"
Chart (2021–2023)	Peak position
Argentina Hot 100 (Billboard)	64
Australia (ARIA)	2
Austria (Ö3 Austria Top 40)	19
Belgium (Ultratop 50 Flanders)	21
Belgium Urban (Ultratop Flanders)	7
Belgium (Ultratop 50 Wallonia)	11
Bolivia (Monitor Latino)	4
Brazil (Top 100 Brasil)	39
Canada Hot 100 (Billboard)	5
Canada AC (Billboard)	26
Canada CHR/Top 40 (Billboard)	1
Canada Hot AC (Billboard)	6
CIS Airplay (TopHit)	73
Croatia International Airplay (HRT)	5
Czech Republic Airplay (ČNS IFPI)	23
Czech Republic Singles Digital (ČNS IFPI)	6
Denmark (Tracklisten)	4
El Salvador (Monitor Latino)	5
Estonia Airplay (TopHit)	180
Finland (Suomen virallinen lista)	3
France (SNEP)	23
Germany (GfK)	31
Greece International (IFPI)	5
Global 200 (Billboard)	3
Honduras (Monitor Latino)	17
Hungary (Rádiós Top 40)	5
Hungary (Single Top 40)	20
Hungary (Stream Top 40)	12
Iceland (Tónlistinn)	12
India International Singles (IMI)	8
Ireland (IRMA)	2
Israel (Media Forest)	9
Italy (FIMI)	59
Japan Hot 100 (Billboard)	97
Lebanon (Lebanese Top 20)	16
Lithuania (AGATA)	2
Malaysia (RIM)	1
Mexico (Billboard Mexican Airplay)	1
Netherlands (Dutch Top 40)	8
Netherlands (Single Top 100)	7
New Zealand (Recorded Music NZ)	1
Norway (VG-lista)	4
Panama (PRODUCE)	31
Peru (UNIMPRO)	10
Portugal (AFP)	12
Romania (Airplay 100)	50
Russia Airplay (TopHit)	6
San Marino (SMRRTV Top 50)	39
Singapore (RIAS)	1
Slovakia Airplay (ČNS IFPI)	28
Slovakia Singles Digital (ČNS IFPI)	9
South Africa (TOSAC)	9
South Korea (Gaon)	104
Spain (Promusicae)	64
Sweden (Sverigetopplistan)	17
Switzerland (Schweizer Hitparade)	13
UK Singles (Official Charts)	3
US Billboard Hot 100	3
US Adult Contemporary (Billboard)	18
US Adult Pop Airplay (Billboard)	6
US Dance Airplay (Billboard)	3
US Pop Airplay (Billboard)	1
US R&B/Hip-Hop Airplay (Billboard)	34
US Rhythmic Airplay (Billboard)	1
US Rolling Stone Top 100	2
Vietnam (Vietnam Hot 100)	25

=== Monthly charts ===
Monthly chart performance for "Kiss Me More"
Chart (2021)	Peak position
CIS Airplay (TopHit)	77
Czech Republic (Rádio – Top 100)	58
Czech Republic (Singles Digitál Top 100)	7
Russia Airplay (TopHit)	74
Slovakia (Rádio – Top 100)	92
Slovakia (Singles Digitál Top 100)	8

=== Year-end charts ===
2021 year-end chart performance for "Kiss Me More"
Chart (2021)	Position
Australia (ARIA)	9
Austria (Ö3 Austria Top 40)	58
Belgium (Ultratop Flanders)	66
Belgium (Ultratop Wallonia)	40
Brazil Streaming (Pro-Música Brasil)	176
Canada (Canadian Hot 100)	11
Chile (Monitor Latino)	78
Denmark (Tracklisten)	22
El Salvador (Monitor Latino)	42
France (SNEP)	56
Germany (Official German Charts)	92
Global 200 (Billboard)	13
Hungary (Rádiós Top 40)	31
Hungary (Stream Top 40)	33
Ireland (IRMA)	12
Mexico (Monitor Latino)	9
Netherlands (Dutch Top 40)	61
Netherlands (Single Top 100)	39
New Zealand (Recorded Music NZ)	5
Norway (VG-lista)	22
Panama (Monitor Latino)	89
Portugal (AFP)	38
Puerto Rico (Monitor Latino)	35
South Korea (Gaon)	162
Sweden (Sverigetopplistan)	66
Switzerland (Schweizer Hitparade)	43
UK Singles (OCC)	14
US Billboard Hot 100	6
US Adult Top 40 (Billboard)	25
US Dance/Mix Show Airplay (Billboard)	3
US Mainstream Top 40 (Billboard)	4
US Rhythmic (Billboard)	2
Venezuela (Monitor Latino)	68

2022 year-end chart performance for "Kiss Me More"
Chart (2022)	Position
Australia (ARIA)	34
Canada (Canadian Hot 100)	54
Global 200 (Billboard)	39
New Zealand (Recorded Music NZ)	37
US Billboard Hot 100	90
US Adult Contemporary (Billboard)	46
Vietnam (Vietnam Hot 100)	49

== Certifications ==
Certifications for "Kiss Me More"
Region	Certification	Certified units/sales
Australia (ARIA)	7× Platinum	490,000^{‡}
Austria (IFPI Austria)	Platinum	30,000^{‡}
Brazil (Pro-Música Brasil)	3× Diamond	480,000^{‡}
Canada (Music Canada)	4× Platinum	320,000^{‡}
Denmark (IFPI Danmark)	2× Platinum	180,000^{‡}
France (SNEP)	Diamond	333,333^{‡}
Germany (BVMI)	Gold	200,000^{‡}
Italy (FIMI)	Platinum	70,000^{‡}
Mexico (AMPROFON)	4× Platinum+Gold	630,000^{‡}
New Zealand (RMNZ)	7× Platinum	210,000^{‡}
Norway (IFPI Norway)	2× Platinum	120,000^{‡}
Poland (ZPAV)	2× Platinum	100,000^{‡}
Portugal (AFP)	2× Platinum	20,000^{‡}
Spain (Promusicae)	2× Platinum	120,000^{‡}
Switzerland (IFPI Switzerland)	Gold	10,000^{‡}
United Kingdom (BPI)	2× Platinum	1,200,000^{‡}
United States (RIAA)	5× Platinum	5,000,000^{‡}
Streaming
Greece (IFPI Greece)	Platinum	2,000,000^{†}
Sweden (GLF)	Platinum	8,000,000^{†}
^{‡} Sales+streaming figures based on certification alone.^{†} Streaming-only figures based on certification alone.

== Remix ==
"Kiss Me More" (Remix)

Single by Doja Cat featuring Naomi Watanabe
- Released: July 22, 2022
- Recorded: 2022
- Studio: Germano Studios (New York, New York)
- Genre: Pop; bubblegum pop; dance-pop; pop rap
- Length: 3:29
- Label: Kemosabe; RCA
- Songwriters: Amala Dlamini; Solána Rowe; David Sprecher; Rogét Chahayed; Gerard A. Powell; Carter Lang; Lukasz Gottwald; Stephen Kipner; Terry Shaddick
- Producers: Yeti Beats; Rogét Chahayed; Tizhimself; Carter Lang

Naomi Watanabe singles chronology
"Kira Kira" (2017)	"Kiss Me More" (Remix) (2022)

Visualizer
- "Kiss Me More" (Remix) on YouTube

On July 22, 2022, Sony Music Japan announced a remix of "Kiss Me More" was released to digital stores, with Japanese comedian Naomi Watanabe replacing SZA as a featured artist. The remix was produced by Kentaro Fuji with Japanese lyrics and vocal direction by Japanese rapper Awich. The remix was Watanabe's second official music recording, her previous being "Kira Kira" with Japanese-American singer Ai in 2017.

=== Credits and personnel ===
Credits adapted from Tidal and official release page.

- Doja Cat – lead vocals, songwriting
- Naomi Watanabe – featured artist
- SZA – songwriting
- Yeti Beats – songwriting, production
- Rogét Chahayed – songwriting, production
- Tizhimself – songwriting, additional production
- Carter Lang – songwriting, additional production
- Lukasz Gottwald – songwriting
- Stephen Kipner – songwriting, interpolation
- Terry Shaddick – songwriting, interpolation
- Joe Visciano – engineering
- John Hanes – engineering
- Lloyd "2Fly" Mizell – engineering
- Chris Gehringer – mastering
- Serban Ghenea – mixing
- Akiko Urasaki – translation, vocal direction
- Shimi – mixing
- Kenta Yonesaka – vocal recording
- Sora Aota – cover art
- Kentaro Fuji – remixing

=== Charts ===
Weekly chart performance for "Kiss Me More" featuring Naomi Watanabe
Chart (2022)	Peak position
Japan Hot Overseas (Billboard Japan)	12

== Release history ==
Release dates and formats for "Kiss Me More"
Region	Date	Format(s)	Version	Label(s)	Ref.
Various	April 9, 2021	Digital download; streaming	Original	Kemosabe; RCA	
United States	April 9, 2021	Adult contemporary radio; contemporary hit radio; dance radio; rhythmic radio	Original	Kemosabe; RCA	
United States	April 13, 2021	Contemporary hit radio	Original	Kemosabe; RCA	
United States	April 13, 2021	Rhythmic radio	Original	Kemosabe; RCA	
Italy	April 16, 2021	Radio airplay	Original	Sony	
United States	May 17, 2021	Adult contemporary radio	Original	Kemosabe; RCA	
Various	July 22, 2022	Digital download; streaming	Remix; with Naomi Watanabe	Kemosabe; RCA; Sony Japan	
United States	September 12, 2025	Target exclusive 4-inch vinyl	Original	Legacy	
