= Gift (Ai song) =

Single by Ai

from the EP It's All Me, Vol. 1
- Language: Japanese
- Released: April 24, 2020
- Recorded: 2019
- Genre: J-pop
- Length: 3:38
- Label: EMI; Universal
- Songwriter(s): Ai Uemura; Uta
- Producer(s): Uta; Uemura

Ai singles chronology
"Good as Gold" (2020)	"Gift" (2020)	"Not So Different" (2020)

Music video
- "Gift" on YouTube

"Gift" (Note: Japanese: ギフト; Hepburn: Gifuto) is a song recorded by Japanese-American singer-songwriter Ai, released April 24, 2020, by EMI Records. The song served as the theme song for TBS' King's Brunch and subsequently as the fifth and final single from Ai's extended play, It's All Me, Vol. 1.

== Background and promotion ==
In March 2020, TBS announced Ai would be releasing a song titled "Gift", which would serve as the theme song for their King's Brunch variety show in celebration of its 25th anniversary. The program's chief producer Wataru Hiraga stated that only the chorus of the song would be used for the theme song, but recommended to listen to the full song.

A lyric video teaser was released two days prior to the song's release. In June, "Gift" was revealed to be included on Ai's extended play, It's All Me, Vol. 1 as the fifth and final single.

== Music and lyrics ==
Billboard Japan described "Gift" as a "message song" that shows the value of Ai, comparing the song to her 2011 single, "Happiness".

== Music video ==
A music video for "Gift" was released in June 2020. Directed by Kensaku Kakimoto, Ai is seen singing with various flowers in the background, meant to represent life forces. A red thread is shown connecting the flowers, referring to the read thread of fate.

== Live performances ==
Ai performed "Gift" during her Global Citizen Together at Home performance live on Instagram. She additionally performed the song live on Nippon Television's Sukiri on June 24, 2020.

== Track listing ==
Digital download and streaming

1. "Gift" — 3:38

== Charts ==
Chart performance for "Gift"
Chart (2020)	Peak position
Japan Digital Singles Chart (Oricon)	44
Japan Download Songs (Billboard Japan)	53

== Personnel ==
Credits adapted from Tidal.

- Ai Uemura – songwriting, production, lead vocals
- Uta – songwriting, production

== Release history ==
Release history and formats for "Gift"
Region	Date	Format	Label	Ref.
Various	April 24, 2020	Digital download; streaming	EMI; Universal	
