= Summer Magic (song) =

2019 single by Ai

- Japanese version single cover

Single by Ai

from the EP It's All Me, Vol. 1
- B-side: "Summer Magic (Japanese Version)"
- Released: May 17, 2019
- Recorded: 2019
- Genre: Tropical; pop; R&B
- Length: 3:35
- Label: EMI
- Songwriters: Leon Thomas III; Ai Uemura; Khris Riddick-Tynes
- Producers: The Rascals; Ai

Ai singles chronology
"Kira Kira" (2017)	"Summer Magic" (2019)	"You Never Know" (2019)

Music video
- "Summer Magic" on YouTube "Summer Magic" (Japanese version) on YouTube

"Summer Magic" is a song recorded by Japanese-American singer-songwriter Ai, released on May 17, 2019, through EMI Records. It is Ai's first single to be recorded fully in English and served as her second international single, her first being "Beautiful Life" (2012). The song, written and produced by The Rascals and Ai, is an upbeat tropical song with R&B and pop elements. Lyrically, the song is about being with a lover at the beach during summer. The Japanese version of "Summer Magic" was included on Ai's extended play, It's All Me, Vol. 1 (2020).

== Background and release ==
I'm very happy to be able to collaborate with Amazon for the 20th anniversary of my debut! "Summer Magic" is a song I wrote for a commercial that will liven up this summer...It's a happy summer song that makes you want to hum right away with unprecedented sounds and melody lines.

— Ai's comment on "Summer Magic"

After giving birth to her second child in December 2018, Ai returned to her musical career after a year break. To celebrate her twenty-year anniversary in the music industry and the then upcoming 2020 Summer Olympics, Ai traveled to her hometown, Los Angeles, California, to record a series of songs for an album. On May 1, 2019, the song and its accompanying music video were teased on her social media. In addition to the English version, Universal announced a Japanese version would be released through Universal Japan on the same day. Upon its release, it was announced that the Japanese version would be used in an advertisement by Amazon for their series of Echo devices.

In an outdoor advertisement displayed at Shinjuku Station for "Summer Magic", Ai revealed her distaste of searching her name mononymously on search engines would show results for artificial intelligence rather than information about her. She jokingly added, "Is it just me or will artificial intelligence take away my job?"

== Live performances ==
Ai performed "Summer Magic" and other songs during her 20th anniversary premium live gospel choir tour that took place in November 2019. Further performances were scheduled in 2020 but were cancelled due to the COVID-19 pandemic. The tour was rescheduled to May 2021 and was postponed due to rising cases of COVID-19 in Japan as of May 10, 2021.

== Music video ==
A music video was shot in early 2019 in Penghu. Recorded by drone, Ai is seen singing while wandering a beach and various locations within a town. Various shots of the island are seen throughout the video. The video closes with Ai standing on a cliff near the ocean watching the sunset.

== Track listing ==
- Digital download and streaming
  1. "Summer Magic" – 3:35
- Digital download and streaming (Japanese version)
  1. "Summer Magic" (Japanese Version) – 3:37

== Credits and personnel ==
Credits adapted from Tidal.

- Ai Uemura – vocals, songwriter, producer
- Leon Thomas III – songwriter, producer
- Khris Riddick-Tynes – songwriter, producer

== Charts ==
Annual chart rankings for "Summer Magic"
Chart (2019)	Rank
Tokyo (Tokio Hot 100)	44

== Release history ==
Release history and formats for "Summer Magic"
Region	Date	Format	Version	Label	Ref.
Various	May 17, 2019	Digital download; streaming	Original	EMI; Universal	
Various	May 17, 2019	Digital download; streaming	Japanese version	EMI; Universal	
