= Baby You Can Cry =

Single by Ai

from the album Kansha!!!!! – Thank You for 20 Years New and Best
- Language: English; Japanese
- Released: September 27, 2019
- Recorded: 2019
- Genre: R&B
- Length: 3:13
- Label: EMI
- Songwriters: Ai Uemura; Ryosuke Imai
- Producers: Ai; Ryosuke Imai

Ai singles chronology
| "You Never Know" (2019) | "Baby You Can Cry" (2019) | "I'm Coming Home" (2020) |

Music video
- "Baby You Can Cry" on YouTube

"Baby You Can Cry" is a song recorded by Japanese-American singer-songwriter Ai, released September 27, 2019, by EMI Records. The song samples Namie Amuro's song, "Baby Don't Cry" and served as the lead single for Ai's greatest hits album, Kansha!!!!! – Thank You for 20 Years New and Best.

== Background and release ==
Celebrating her twenty-year anniversary in the music industry, Ai traveled to Los Angeles, California to record new content for an album. In September 2019, "Baby You Can Cry" was announced for release later that month along with a greatest hits album in November. A gospel choir tour was also announced to take place in Japan in support of the album.

The song was released digitally on September 27.

== Live performances ==
Ai performed "Baby You Can Cry" and other songs during her 20th anniversary premium live gospel choir tour that took place in November 2019. Further performances were scheduled in 2020 but were cancelled due to the COVID-19 pandemic. The tour was rescheduled to May 2021 and was postponed due to rising cases of COVID-19 in Japan as of May 10, 2021.

== Music video ==
A music video was released the same day the song was released. The video was recorded at a recording studio in Tokyo.

== Charts ==
Chart performance for "Baby You Can Cry"
| Chart (2019) | Peak position |
|---|---|
| Japan Top Download Songs (Billboard Japan) | 92 |

Annual chart rankings for "Baby You Can Cry"
| Chart (2019) | Rank |
|---|---|
| Tokyo (Tokio Hot 100) | 25 |

== Release history ==
Release history and formats for "Baby You Can Cry"
| Region | Date | Format | Label | Ref. |
|---|---|---|---|---|
| Various | September 27, 2019 | Digital download; streaming | EMI; Universal | |
| Japan | November 1, 2019 | Radio airplay | Universal Japan | |
