= Good as Gold (song) =

Single by Ai

from the EP It's All Me, Vol. 1
- Language: English; Japanese
- Released: March 23, 2020
- Recorded: 2019
- Genre: Pop
- Length: 3:20
- Label: EMI
- Songwriters: Rogét Chahayed; Lindy Robbins; Taylor Dexter; Ai Uemura
- Producers: Chahayed; Dexter; Ai

Ai singles chronology
"I'm Coming Home" (2020)	"Good as Gold" (2020)	"Gift" (2020)

"Good as Gold" is a song recorded by Japanese-American singer-songwriter Ai, released March 23, 2022, by EMI Records. Written by Rogét Chahayed, Lindy Robbins, Taylor Dexter and Ai, the song served as the fourth single from Ai's extended play, It's All Me, Vol. 1.

In Japan, "Good as Gold" was used in commercial advertisements for Lux.

== Background and release ==
Good as Gold
A 30-second sample of the "Good as Gold" chorus by Ai in English

In 2019, Ai traveled to her hometown, Los Angeles, California to record material for a new album. While in California, Ai worked with Lindy Robbins to write "Good as Gold". Robbins and Ai also worked with producers Rogét Chahayed and Taylor Dexter to write the song. Regarding production of the song, Chahayed stated he recorded the piano first before the lyrics of the song were complete. Robbins commented, "It's wonderful to write music that bridges countries and has a positive message".

"Good as Gold" was released with no prior announcement. Universal Japan announced the song would serve as a commercial tie-in for Lux in Japan.

== Live performances ==
A video of Ai singing "Good as Gold" in a recording studio was released to YouTube in July 2020 as part of a studio session series.

== Personnel ==
Credits adapted from Tidal and official album profile.

- Ai Uemura – songwriting, production, lead vocals
- Lindy Robbins – songwriting
- Rogét Chahayed – songwriting, production, piano
- Taylor Dexter – songwriting, production
- Randy Merrill – mastering

== Release history ==
Release history and formats for "Good as Gold"
Region	Date	Format	Label	Ref.
Various	January 14, 2020	Digital download; streaming	EMI; Universal	
