= I'm Coming Home (Ai song) =

Single by Ai

from the EP It's All Me, Vol. 1
- Language: Japanese; English
- Released: January 14, 2020
- Recorded: 2019
- Genre: R&B
- Length: 5:04
- Label: EMI
- Songwriter(s): Ruri Matsumura; Ai Uemura; Jin
- Producer(s): Jin; Ai

Ai singles chronology
"Baby You Can Cry" (2019)	"I'm Coming Home" (2020)	"Good as Gold" (2020)

Music video
- "I'm Coming Home" on YouTube

"I'm Coming Home" (Note: Japanese: 僕らを待つ場所; Hepburn: Bokura wo Matsu Basho) is a song recorded by Japanese-American singer-songwriter Ai, released on January 14, 2020, by EMI Records. Written by Ruri Matsumura, Ai and Jin, the song served as the theme song for the sci-fi thriller AI Hokai.

== Background and release ==
In October 2019, it was revealed Ai would sing the theme song for AI Amok, a Japanese sci-fi thriller film directed by Yu Ire. Ai was asked by Ire to record a song for his film as he wanted a female artist to sing the theme song. Regarding the film being about artificial intelligence and the irony of recruiting Ai to record a song for the film, Ire stated, “People asked me if I was joking at first, but she wrote a great song”. Ire also stated he "absolutely needed Ai's loving and powerful singing". In a 2020 interview regarding her 2020 extended play It's All Me, Vol. 1, Ai talked about "I'm Coming Home", commenting, "The movie was about artificial intelligence, but I wanted to make the theme song human-like".

In June 2020, "I'm Coming Home" was revealed to be included on Ai's EP, It's All Me, Vol. 1 serving as the third single.

== Music and lyrics ==
Billboard described "I'm Coming Home" as a "warm, inspirational ballad that sings about having a place to come home to".

== Music video ==
A music video was released on the same day of the songs release. The music video focuses on the real lives of three different families, similar to a documentary. Scenes where Ai is singing by the sea were shot at Tojo beach in Kamogawa in the Chiba Prefecture, where a scene from the film was recorded. The music video was directed by Ire.

== Live performances ==
Ai performed the song during TBS' Count Down TV broadcast.

== Personnel ==
Credits adapted from Tidal.

- Ai Uemura – songwriting, lead vocals, production
- Ruri Matsumura – songwriting
- Jin – production, songwriting, arrangement
- Futoshi Kawashima – arrangement

== Release history ==
Release history and formats for "I'm Coming Home"
Region	Date	Format	Label	Ref.
Various	January 14, 2020	Digital download; streaming	EMI; Universal	
