= Not So Different =

2020 single by Ai

Single by Ai

from the EP It's All Me, Vol. 2
- Language: Japanese; English
- Released: November 25, 2020
- Genre: J-pop; pop rap
- Length: 3:42
- Label: EMI
- Songwriters: Ai Uemura; Rachel West; Vincent Van den Ende; Scott Storch
- Producers: Avedon; Scott Storch; Ai

Ai singles chronology
"Gift" (2020)	"Not So Different" (2020)	"The Moment" (2021)

Awich singles chronology
"Aligator / FND Airlines" (2020)	"Not So Different" (2020)	"Happy X-mas (War Is Over)" (2020)

Music video
- "Not So Different" on YouTube "Not So Different Remix feat. Awich" on YouTube

"Not So Different" is a song recorded by Japanese-American singer-songwriter Ai. It was released on November 25, 2020. The song was written by Ai and Rachel West with additional songwriting credits from producers Avedon and Scott Storch and was included on It's All Me, Vol. 2 (2021).

On December 11, 2020, a remix featuring Japanese rapper Awich was released and later included on It's All Me, Vol. 2. A J-pop and pop rap song, "Not So Different" lyrically is about equality and world peace. The song has been compared to Ai's 2006 single "I Wanna Know".

== Background ==
When I [wrote Not So Different], I hadn't decided to put this song on "Volume two" [...] At that time, the Black Lives Matter movement expanded, and [I] decided to put [it] out now. I always want[ed] to send a message like this, but often I can't put out a song unless the timing is right.

— Ai reflecting on including "Not So Different" on It's All Me, Vol. 2

Ai originally wrote and recorded the song during her 2019 recording session in Los Angeles, California. She originally performed the song in June 2020 amidst the George Floyd protests in an interview with Salesforce. In October 2020, Ai announced she would be participating in the One Young World summit to take place in Tokyo in May 2021. "Not So Different" originally was not planned for release as a single nor planned to be included on Ai's It's All Me EP's until November 2020. In an interview with Oricon regarding the lyric "...a peace sign instead of a middle finger", Ai stated she normally does not express herself directly in her songs and that she "...wanted to express such a part in an easy-to-understand manner."

=== Awich remix ===
A remix of Not So Different featuring Awich was announced a few days after the release of the solo version. Regarding the remix, Ai stated it originally was not planned until she discussed it with her manager. It was released on December 11, 2020.

== Music video ==
A music video for the solo version was released on November 25, 2020. A One Young World Japan version was released in December 2020.

In February 2021, a music video for the remix version featuring Awich was released.

== Live performances ==
Ai previously performed the song before its release in June 2020. She performed the song with Awich in November 2020.

== Charts ==
Chart performance for "Not So Different"
Chart (2020)	Peak position
Japan Top Download Songs (Billboard Japan)	79

== Credits and personnel ==
Credits adapted from Tidal.

=== Solo version ===
==== Musicians ====
- Ai Uemura – vocals, production, songwriting
- Rachel West – songwriting
- Vincent Van den Ende – songwriting, production
- Scott Storch –songwriting, production

==== Technical ====
- Randy Merrill – mastering engineer
- D.O.I – mixer

=== Awich remix ===
==== Musicians ====
- Ai Uemura – vocals, production, songwriting
- Akiko Urasaki – vocals, songwriting
- Rachel West – songwriting
- Vincent Van den Ende – songwriting, production
- Scott Storch –songwriting, production

==== Technical ====
- Randy Merrill – mastering engineer
- D.O.I – mixer
- Keisuke Fujimaki – recording engineer
- Keisuke Suwa – recording engineer
- Shiori Maruoka – recording engineer

== Track listing ==
Digital download

1. "Not So Different" – 3:42

Awich remix

1. "Not So Different" (remix) – 3:41

== Release history ==
Release history and formats for "Not So Different"
Region	Date	Format	Version	Label	Ref.
Various	November 25, 2020	Digital download; streaming	Original	EMI; Universal	
Various	December 11, 2020	Digital download; streaming	Awich remix	EMI; Universal	
