= Kōsui (Eito song) =

2019 debut single by Eito

Single by Eito

from the album Sukkarakan
- B-side: "Matane" "Kimi no Ai to Boku no Ai"
- Released: 21 April 2019
- Genre: J-pop
- Length: 4:12
- Label: A.S.A.B
- Songwriter: 8s

Eito singles chronology
"Kōsui" (2019)	"Hip Hop wa Utaenai" (2019)

Music video
- "Kōsui" on YouTube

"Kōsui" (香水; lit. "Perfume") is a song by Japanese singer and songwriter Eito from his debut studio album, Sukkarakan (2021). The song was initially self-released for digital download and streaming on 21 April 2019 as the singer's debut single, and later released through A.S.A.B. "Kōsui" is an acoustic guitar-laid J-pop song, inspired by his experience of breakup.

The song gained national recognition after it became a viral hit on TikTok with users covering the song. Its popularity on the social media app is credited to the lyrics with the incorporation of the memorable proper nouns such as Line and Dolce & Gabbana.

In Japan, "Kōsui" became Eito's breakthrough hit, topping the Billboard Japan Hot 100 and the Oricon Weekly Singles Chart, as well as topping on the Spotify Global Viral Top 50. As of August 2020, the song has been streamed over 100 million times. The cover videos of the song filmed by celebrities boosted its popularity and made Eito the household name. The celebrities such as Shingo Katori, Chocolate Planet, Misako Uno, and Naoto Inti Raymi have covered the song so far. On 31 December 2020, Eito performed the song at the 71st Kōhaku Uta Gassen, one of the most prestigious music festival in Japan.

== Accolades ==
Awards and nominations for "Kōsui"
Ceremony	Year	Award	Result
MTV Video Music Awards Japan	2020	MTV Breakthrough Song	Won
Japan Record Awards	2020	Excellent Work Award	Won
Japan Record Awards	2020	Grand Prix	Nominated
GQ Men of the Year	2020	Breakthrough Song of the Year	Won

== Commercial performance ==
On 4 May 2020, "Kōsui" debuted on the Billboard Japan Hot 100 at number 34, boosted by the popularity on TikTok. On 25 May 2020, it peaked on the chart at number one. As of 25 November 2020, the song has stayed on the chart for 30 consecutive weeks.

== Music video ==
The music video for "Kōsui" was directed and filmed by Keita Inaba. The video was released on YouTube on 28 May 2019, and has accumulated over 124 million views as of November 2020. The video features Eito singing over the acoustic guitar, played by Junnosuke Onodera, and the contemporary dance played by Akari Kamayachi.

== Track listing ==
No.	Title	Length
1.	"Kōsui"	4:12
2.	"Matane" (featuring Chinatsu Matsumoto)	4:12
3.	"Kimi no Ai to Boku no Ai"	4:56
Total length:		13:20

== Charts ==
=== Weekly charts ===
Weekly peak performance for "Kōsui"
Chart (2020)	Peak position
Global 200 (Billboard)	175
Japan (Japan Hot 100)	1
Japan Combined Singles (Oricon)	1

=== Year-end charts ===
Year-end chart performance for "Kōsui"
Chart (2020)	Position
Japan (Japan Hot 100)	6
Japan Digital Singles (Oricon)	9
Chart (2021)	Position
Japan (Japan Hot 100)	53

=== All-time charts ===
All-time chart performance for "Kōsui"
Chart (2008–2022)	Position
Japan (Japan Hot 100)	20

== Certifications ==
Certifications for "Kōsui"
Region	Certification	Certified units/sales
Japan (RIAJ) Digital	Platinum	250,000^{*}
Streaming
Japan (RIAJ)	3× Platinum	300,000,000^{†}
^{*} Sales figures based on certification alone.^{†} Streaming-only figures based on certification alone.

== Release history ==
Release dates and formats for "Kōsui"
Region	Date	Format(s)	Label
Various	21 April 2019	Digital download; streaming	Self-released; A.S.A.B
Japan	29 February 2020	CD-ROM	Amazon.co.jp
