= You Never Know (Ai song) =

Single by Ai featuring MJ116

from the EP It's All Me, Vol. 1
- Language: English; Japanese; Mandarin
- Released: August 9, 2019
- Recorded: 2019
- Genre: Hip hop; mandopop; J-pop
- Length: 4:36
- Label: EMI
- Songwriter(s): Ai Uemura; Mu Yuan Lin; Wen Jie Zhou; Yu Rong Chen
- Producer(s): Vava; AI

Ai singles chronology
"Summer Magic" (2019)	"You Never Know" (2019)	"Baby You Can Cry" (2019)

Music video
- "You Never Know" on YouTube

"You Never Know" is a song recorded by Japanese-American singer-songwriter Ai featuring Taiwanese hip hop group MJ116, released on August 9, 2019, by EMI Records as the second single from Ai's extended play, It's All Me, Vol. 1.

== Background and release ==
Celebrating her twenty year anniversary in the music industry, Ai traveled to her hometown, Los Angeles, California to record new material. Looking to collaborate with various artists around the world, Ai discovered MJ116, a hip hop group based in Taiwan. After talking to the group via email and Line, Ai traveled to Taiwan to record a song. Members of MJ116 were nervous at first to record with Ai when they first received a demo of the song. Prior to meeting in-person, the group received affirmations from Ai, which built up their confidence to record with her.

In 2020, "You Never Know" was revealed to be included on Ai's extended play, It's All Me, Vol. 1.

== Live performances ==
Ai performed the song with MJ116 at the 2019 Summer Sonic Fest.

== Credits and personnel ==
Credits adapted from Tidal.

- Ai Uemura – vocals, songwriter, producer
- MJ116 – featured artist
- Vava – producer, composer
- Mu Yuan Lin – songwriter, vocals
- Wen Jie Zhou – songwriter, vocals
- Yu Rong Chen – songwriter, vocals

== Release history ==
Release history and formats for "You Never Know"
Region	Date	Format	Label	Ref.
Various	August 9, 2019	Digital download; streaming	EMI; Universal	
