= 2020 MTV Video Music Awards Japan =

Annual Japanese music awards ceremony

- Date: October 29, 2020
- Hosted by: Bish

Television/radio coverage
- Network: MTV Japan

The 2020 MTV Video Music Awards Japan were held on October 29, 2020.

== Main awards ==
=== Best video of the year ===
Aimyon - "Naked Heart"

=== Best Male video ===
Japan

Kenshi Yonezu - "Kanden"

International

The Weeknd - "Blinding Lights"

=== Best female video ===
Japan

Aimyon - "Naked Heart"

International

Dua Lipa - "Break My Heart"

=== Best group video ===
Japan

Official Hige Dandism - "I Love..."

International

BTS - "Dynamite"

=== Best new artist video ===
Japan

Macaroni Enpitsu - "Koibito-gokko"

International

Doja Cat - "Say So"

=== Best rock video ===
King Gnu - "Doron"

=== Best alternative video ===
Millennium Parade - "Fly With Me"

=== Best pop video ===
Little Glee Monster - "Ashiato"

=== Best R&B video ===
Fujii Kaze - "Nan-Nan"

=== Best hip hop video ===
Creepy Nuts - "Katsute Tensaidatta Oretachie"

=== Best dance video ===
NiziU - "Make you happy"

=== Best collaboration video ===
Lisa - "Play the world!" with Pablo

=== Best art direction video ===
Generations from Exile Tribe - "One in a Million -kiseki no yoru ni-"

=== Best cinematography ===
Bish - "Letters"

=== Best choreography ===
Hinatazaka46 – "Seishun no uma"

== Special awards ==
=== Artist of the year ===
Daiki Tsuneta

=== Song of the year ===
Yoasobi - "Yoru ni kakeru"

=== Best album of the year ===
Babymetal - Metal Galaxy

=== Music video breakthrough song ===
Eito - "Kōsui"

=== Best buzz award ===
Dish

=== Rising star award ===
JO1

=== Inspiration award Japan ===
E-girls
