= Justice Will Prevail at Last =

2017 single by Ai

Single by Ai

from the album Wa to Yo
- Language: Japanese; English
- B-side: "Feel It"
- Released: May 9, 2017
- Genre: J-pop; electropop
- Length: 4:04
- Label: EMI; Universal
- Songwriter: Ai Uemura
- Producers: Uta; Uemura

Ai singles chronology
"Happy Christmas / Heiwa / Miracle" (2016)	"Justice Will Prevail at Last" (2017)	"Kira Kira" (2017)

Music video
- "Justice Will Prevail at Last" on YouTube

"Justice Will Prevail at Last" (最後は必ず正義が勝つ, Saigo wa Kanarazu Seigi ga Katsu) is a song written and recorded by Japanese-American singer-songwriter Ai. Released on May 9, 2017, via EMI Records, the song served as the lead single for Ai's eleventh studio album, Wa to Yo.

== Background and release ==
I wanted to say the obvious thing, saying that you shouldn't do any harm to people. Even if you do something wrong, someone will surely see it...

— Ai reflecting on the lyrics of Justice Will Prevail at Last

Recorded originally for the second season of the Japanese drama show Emergency Interrogation Room, Ai teased an excerpt of the track in a video announcing Wa to Yo in April 2017. "Justice Will Prevail at Last" was released digitally on May 9, 2017. Aries Moross served as the art director for the accompanying lyric video.

== Composition and lyrics ==
Justice Will Prevail at Last
A 27-second sample of "Justice Will Prevail at Last". Critics compared the song's composition to chiptune music found in early video games. The chorus of the song is the song title in Japanese repetitively.

Musically, "Justice Will Prevail at Last" is a J-pop and electropop song. Multiple critics have described that the song heavily incorporates sounds similar to chiptune music found in early video games. Traditional Japanese instruments such as the taiko are also used within the song. Lyrically, the track is about confronting the evil in the world.

== Track listing ==
- Digital download and streaming
1. "Justice Will Prevail at Last" – 4:04
2. "Feel It" – 3:11
- Digital download and streaming – Apple Music version
1. "Justice Will Prevail at Last" – 4:04
2. "Feel It" – 3:11
3. "Justice Will Prevail at Last" (instrumental) – 4:04
4. "Feel It" (instrumental) – 3:11

== Charts ==
Chart performance for "Justice Will Prevail at Last"
Chart (2017)	Peak position
Japan (Japan Hot 100)	74

== Personnel ==
Credits adapted from Wa to Yo liner notes and Tidal.

- Ai Carina Uemura – vocals, songwriting, production
- Uta – production, recording arrangement
- Kodō – overdubbing
- D.O.I – mixing
- Tom Coyne – mastering

== Release history ==
Release history and formats for "Justice Will Prevail at Last"
Region	Date	Format	Label	Ref.
Japan	May 9, 2017	Digital download; streaming	EMI; Universal	
