= Letter in the Sky =

2011 single by Ai featuring The Jacksons

- Digital single cover

Single by Ai featuring the Jacksons

from the album Independent
- Language: English; Japanese
- A-side: "Happiness"
- Released: December 14, 2011
- Recorded: 2011
- Studio: Candy House Studio (Eagle Rock, Los Angeles, California)
- Genre: R&B; J-pop
- Length: 4:43
- Label: EMI Japan
- Songwriters: Ai Uemura; Curtis Jenkins; Danny Lashine; King David "The Future"
- Producers: King David "The Future"; Ai

Ai singles chronology
"Stronger" (2010)	"Letter in the Sky" / "Happiness" (2011)	"Beautiful Life" (2012)

The Jacksons singles chronology
"Who's Lovin' You" (1993)	"Letter in the Sky" (2011)

Music video
- "Letter in the Sky" on YouTube

"Letter in the Sky" is a song recorded by Japanese-American singer-songwriter Ai featuring American pop band the Jacksons. Originally released digitally on October 19, 2011, by EMI Music Japan, it was released physically on December 14, 2011, alongside "Happiness" as an A-side. "Letter in the Sky" served as the lead single from Ai's ninth studio album, Independent (2012).

== Background and release ==
In April 2011, Ai presented a music documentary, Ai Miss Michael Jackson: King of Pop no Kiseki, that was recorded for Music On! TV. In the documentary, she traveled to the United States and interviewed members of the Jackson family in their home.

Completing her contract with Island Records and Universal Sigma, Ai signed a global publishing deal with EMI. Signing to EMI Music Japan, she started to work on her ninth studio album.

In October 2011, "Letter in the Sky" was announced as Ai's first single under EMI. Originally released digitally on October 19, 2011, a physical copy was later released. "Letter in the Sky" served as the theme song for the Michael Jackson Tribute: Live in Tokyo concert that took place December 13 and 14th, 2011 at Yoyogi National Stadium.

On August 14, 2026, Ai released a remix of "Letter in the Sky". The remix was produced by Uta and Ai.

== Music video ==
A music video was released on October 19, 2011. Various clips from the recording session of "Letter in the Sky" are used in the video.

== Track listing ==
"Letter in the Sky" – Digital single
No.	Title	Writer(s)	Producer(s)	Length
1.	"Letter in the Sky" (featuring the Jacksons)	Ai Uemura; Curtis Jenkins; Danny Lashine; King David "The Future"	King David "The Future"; Uemura	4:44

"Happiness / Letter in the Sky" – CD single
No.	Title	Writer(s)	Producer(s)	Length
1.	"Happiness"	Uemura	Uemura; Uta	4:15
2.	"Letter in the Sky" (featuring the Jacksons)	Uemura; Jenkins; Lashine; King David "The Future"	King David "The Future"; Uemura	4:43

"Happiness / Letter in the Sky" – DVD bonus
No.	Title	Length
1.	"Happiness" (music video)
2.	"Letter in the Sky" (music video) (featuring the Jacksons)
3.	"Legendary Night at Nippon Budokan with Super Special Guests" (Digest trailer)

== Charts ==
Chart performance for "Letter in the Sky"
Chart (2011)	Peak position
Japan Hot 100 (Billboard Japan)	36
Japan Singles Chart (Oricon)	14
Japan Top Singles Sales (Billboard Japan)	13

== Credit and personnel ==
Original

- Ai – vocals, songwriter, producer
- Jackie Jackson – vocals
- Marlon Jackson – vocals
- Tito Jackson – vocals
- Curtis Jenkins – songwriter
- Danny Lashine – songwriter
- King David "The Future" – producer, songwriter, programming
- Jesse Josefsson – guitar
- Dan Manzoor – bass (vocal)

Arigato remix

- Ai – vocals, producer
- Jackie Jackson – vocals
- Marlon Jackson – vocals
- Tito Jackson – voals
- D.O.I. – mixing
- Claudio Cueni – engineer

== Release history ==
Release history and formats for "Letter in the Sky"
Region	Date	Format(s)	Version	Label	Ref.
Various	October 19, 2011	Digital download; streaming	Digital	EMI Japan	
Japan	December 14, 2011	CD; DVD	Maxi single	EMI Japan	
Various	August 14, 2026	Digital download; streaming	Arigato remix	EMI	
