= Eito (musician) =

- 瑛人
- Born: Eito Takahashi (高橋 瑛人); June 3, 1997 (age 28); Asahi-ku, Yokohama, Kanagawa, Japan
- Occupations: Singer; songwriter
- Years active: 2019–present
- Musical career
- Genres: J-pop; Reggae
- Instruments: Vocals; guitar
- Label: A.S.A.B
- Website: eitoofficial.com

Eito Takahashi (高橋 瑛人; born June 3, 1997), who is simply known as Eito, is a Japanese singer and songwriter. He rose to prominence when his debut single "Kōsui" became a viral hit on the social media app TikTok in early 2020 before climbing the Billboard Japan Hot 100 to number one and charting on the Billboard Global Excl. U.S. by September of the same year.

"Kōsui" stayed on the top ten on the Billboard Japan Hot 100 for 27 consecutive weeks and has streamed over 200 million plays. Following the success of "Kōsui", Eito got a recording contract with A.S.A.B and management contract with Setsuna International. In 2020, "Kōsui" earned Eito the 2020 MTV Video Music Awards Japan for MTV Breakthrough Song and the 62nd Japan Record Awards for Excellent Work. In January 2021, Eito released his debut album, titled, Sukkarakan, which spawned three further singles, "Hip Hop wa Utaenai", "Right Now", and "Happiness".

In December 2020, Eito released a Cody Chesnutt cover, "Ai ni Michita Sekai (Parting Ways)", for the Japanese version of the 2020 film Soul. He also made a cameo appearance in the film as a street singer with a guitar. In February 2021, it was announced that Eito would perform a theme song for the Japanese version of the 2021 film Tom & Jerry, "Piece of Cake".

== Early life ==
Eito was born in Asahi-ku, Yokohama, Kanagawa. He has two older brothers. His parents got divorced when he was a second year student.

== Career ==
=== 2016–2019: Career beginnings ===
In 2016, Eito attended the music school Mesar Haus in Meguro, Tokyo, where he met his musical mentor and singer-and-songwriter, Rung Hyang. Although he quit the school, the singer continued to make new musical materials, and eventually self-released his debut single, "Kōsui" in April 2019.

=== 2020–2021: Sukkarakan ===
In January 2020, Eito released two singles, "Hip Hop wa Utaenai" and "Singer-Songwriter no Kanojo", both of which had a minor success, only entering the Spotify Japan Viral and iTunes Japan charts. Since the late 2019, "Kōsui" slowly gained populatiry on the social video sharing app TikTok, where the users posted their cover videos of the song. The song eventually entered the Billboard Japan Hot 100 at number 34 in May 2020. The song topped the chart two weeks later and stayed within top ten on the charts for 27 consecutive weeks. The cover videos by the Japanese celebrities boosted its popularity, such as Shingo Katori, Misako Uno, and Chocolate Planet. On 24 July 2020, the singer made his first television appearance at Music Station, performing "Kōsui". The song earned him multiple awards, including 2020 MTV Video Music Awards Japan and 62nd Japan Record Awards. As of December 2020, the song has accumulated more than 200 million streaming plays and sold over 100,000 digital copies.

Following the success of "Kōsui", Eito got a recording contract with A.S.A.B and management contract with Setsuna International. In October 2020, the singer released his first single on A.S.A.B, "Right Now". In the same month, Eito covered Miliyah Kato's song, "Love Forever" with Yama, which was included on Kato's tribute album Inspire (2020). In November 2020, Eito released a cover of AI's "Happiness", which served as the 2020 winter campaign song for Coca-Cola. In December 2020, Eito released a Cody Chesnutt cover, "Ai ni Michita Sekai (Parting Ways)", for the Japanese version of the 2020 film Soul. On 31 December 2020, Eito performed "Kōsui" at the 71st NHK Kōhaku Uta Gassen.

In January 2021, Eito released his debut studio album, Sukkarakan. The album peaked at number nine on the Billboard Japan Hot Albums and number eleven on the Oricon Weekly Albums. In the same month, he provided his vocals to Monkey Majik's "Believe" for their seventh compilation album, 20th Anniversary Best Kachōfūgetsu. In February 2021, the singer embarked on his first national concert tour, Together Sukkarakan. In the same month, it was announced that his song, "Piece of Cake" would serve as the theme song for the Japanese version of the 2021 film Tom & Jerry.

== Artistry and musical influences ==
Eito is known for writing his songs in the free improvisation sessions and reflects his personal experiences on his music. He performed the improvised songs during his first concert tour, Together Sukkarakan. Eito has named Shota Shimizu, Tee, Dai Hirai, and Shōnan no Kaze as his musical influences.

== Awards and nominations ==
Year	Award	Category	Work	Result	Ref.
2020	2020 MTV Video Music Awards Japan	MTV Breakthrough Song	"Kōsui"	Won	
2020	GQ Men of the Year	Breakthrough Song of the Year	"Kōsui"	Won	
2020	Line News Awards 2020	Buzzed Idol/Artist	Himself	Won	
2020	62nd Japan Record Awards	Excellent Work Award	"Kōsui"	Won	
2020	62nd Japan Record Awards	Grand Prix	"Kōsui"	Nominated	
2021	Space Shower Music Awards 2021	Best Breakthrough Artist	Himself	Nominated	
2021	Space Shower Music Awards 2021	People's Choice	Himself	Nominated	

== Discography ==
=== Studio albums ===
List of studio albums, with selected details and chart positions
Title	Album details	Peak chart positions	
Title	Album details	JPN Hot	JPN CD
Sukkarakan	Released: January 1, 2021; Label: A.S.A.B; Formats: CD, Digital download, streaming	9	11
1 or 8	Released: March 16, 2022; Label: A.S.A.B; Formats: CD, Digital download, streaming	—	140

=== Extended plays ===
Title	Album details
Kōsui	Released: April 21, 2019; Label: Self-released; Formats: CD, Digital download, streaming

=== Singles ===
==== As lead artist ====
Title	Year	Peak chart positions		Album
Title	Year	JPN Hot	Glo. Excl. U.S.	Album
"Kōsui"	2019	1	72	Sukkarakan
"Hip Hop wa Utaenai"	2020	—	—	Sukkarakan
"Singer-Songwriter no Kanojo"	2020	—	—	Non-album single
"Right Now"	2020	—	—	Sukkarakan
"Happiness"	2020	—	—	Sukkarakan
"Piece of Cake"	2021	—	—	1 or 8
"Sōji"	2021	—	—	1 or 8
"Kazetabi"	2021	—	—	1 or 8
"Daiseikai"	2021	—	—	1 or 8
"Ha Hi Fu He Ho"	2022	—	—	1 or 8
"Mō 3ji"	2022	—	—	1 or 8
"Kōsui" (Thai Ver.)	2022	—	—	TBA
"Just a Life" (featuring Stamp)	2022	—	—	TBA

==== As featured artist ====
Title	Year	Album
"Sugar" (DJ Chari & DJ Tatsuki featuring Eito)	2021	TBA

==== Promotional singles ====
Title	Year	Album
"Boku wa Baka"	2020	Sukkarakan
"Chest"	2020	Sukkarakan
"Ai ni Michita Sekai (Parting Ways)"	2020	Non-album single
"Happy ni Nareyo"	2020	Sukkarakan
"Saiai"	2022	1 or 8

=== Guest appearances ===
List of non-single guest appearances, showing other artist(s), year released and album name
Title	Year	Other artist(s)	Album
"Love Forever"	2020	Yama	Inspire
"Believe"	2021	Monkey Majik	20th Anniversary Best Kachōfūgetsu

=== Music videos ===
Title	Year	Director
As lead artist
"Kōsui"	2019	Keita Inaba
"Hip Hop wa Utaenai"	2020	Keita Inaba
"Right Now"	2020	Hidenobu Tanabe
"Boku wa Baka"	2020	Takatoshi Tsuchiya
"Happy ni Nareyo"	2021	Shuichi Bamba
"Chest"	2021	Shuichi Bamba
As featured artist
"Believe" (Monkey Majik featuring Eito)	2021	Havit Art Studio

== Filmography ==
Films roles
Year	Title	Roles	Notes	Ref.
2020	Soul	Street singer	Japanese voice-dub	

Television roles
Year	Title	Roles	Notes	Ref.
2020	Mezamashi TV	Himself (monthly presenter)	Breakfast television program	
2021	Jonetsu-Tairiku	Himself	Documentary	

== Tours ==
=== Headlining ===
- Together Sukkarakan (2021)
