= Beautiful Things (Ai song) =

2012 promotional single by Ai

Promotional single by Ai

from the album Independent
- Language: Japanese; English
- Released: February 4, 2012
- Recorded: 2011
- Genre: Orchestral
- Length: 4:45
- Label: EMI Music
- Songwriters: Ai Uemura; Ryan Williamson; Sean Fenton
- Producer: Rykeyz

Music video
- "Beautiful Things" on YouTube

"Beautiful Things" (ウツクシキモノ, Utsukushiki Mono) is a song recorded by Japanese-American singer-songwriter Ai, released on February 4, 2012, by EMI Music Japan as a promotional single from her ninth studio album, Independent. Written by Ai with additional writing credits from producer Rykeyz and composer Redd Stylez, the song served as the closing theme song for Berserk: The Golden Age Arc I: The Egg of the King.

== Background ==
In October 2011, it was revealed that an unreleased song by Ai, titled "Beautiful Things" would serve as the closing theme song for Berserk: The Golden Age Arc I: The Egg of the King. The song was Ai's first to be featured in a dark fantasy anime film and second in general to be featured in an anime, the first being her 2005 single "Crayon Beats" for Crayon Shin-chan. In order to properly write the song, Ai read the Berserk manga. She stated she was skeptical in reading the manga at first, but by volume 4, she "fell in love with it". While recording the song, Ai stated the song was the most challenging song she had recorded.

== Live performances and promotion ==
On January 19, 2012, Ai performed "Beautiful Things" at the completion event for the Berserk movie. Kendo Kobayashi, who was the voice of the main character, Bazuso, appeared with Ai dressed in medieval attire at the event. To further promote the song, Ai announced a karaoke event for the song on January 25, 2012, titled Sing Beautiful Things Championship. The winner of the event would be rewarded ¥100k and a chance to perform the song with Ai live at her Independent Tour 2012. The winner of the challenge was Akane Kiyose. Additionally with the Independent Tour 2012, Ai has performed the song at her The Best Tour (2016).

== Charts ==
Chart performance for "Beautiful Things"
Chart (2012)	Peak position
Japan Adult Contemporary Airplay (Billboard Japan)	67
Digital Track Chart (RIAJ) (Note: The RIAJ Digital Track Chart is a depreciated chart that ran from 2009 until early 2012 and tracked full-length cellphone downloads.)	46
Japan Hot Airplay (Billboard Japan)	83

== Credits and personnel ==
Credits adapted from Tidal.

- Ai Uemura – vocals, songwriter
- Ryan "RyKeyz" Williamson – producer, composer, programming
- Sean "Redd Stylez" Fenton – composer

== Release history ==
Release history and formats for "Beautiful Things"
Region	Date	Format	Label	Ref.
Japan	January 2012	Radio airplay	EMI Music Japan	
Japan	February 4, 2012	Digital download; streaming	EMI Music Japan	
