= Sukkarakan =

Studio album by Eito
- Released: December 24, 2020
- Genre: J-pop; reggae; folk; R&B
- Length: 61:17
- Label: A.S.A.B
- Producer: Rung Hyang; Shingo Sekiguchi

Singles from Sukkarakan
- 1. "Kōsui" Released: April 21, 2019; 2. "Hip Hop wa Utaenai" Released: January 25, 2020; 3. "Right Now" Released: October 16, 2020; 4. "Happiness" Released: November 11, 2020

Sukkarakan (すっからかん, lit. "Empty") is the debut studio album by Japanese singer Eito. It was released through A.S.A.B on December 24, 2020 for digital download and streaming and on January 1, 2021 on CD. It is primarily a J-pop album, with ingrained influences of reggae, folk, and R&B. Eito worked with his musical mentor, Rung Hyang on several songs on the record. The singer listed Hotdogs, In-Sist, and Chinatsu Matsumoto as the guest musicians on the album. The album peaked at number nine on the Billboard Japan Hot Albums and number eleven on the Oricon Weekly Albums chart.

The lead single, "Kōsui" became a viral hit on the social media app TikTok in early 2020 before climbing the Billboard Japan Hot 100 to number one and charting on the Billboard Global Excl. U.S. by September of the same year. "Right Now" was released in October 2020 as the singer's first single from the major label, A.S.A.B. The fourth single from the album, "Happiness" served as the 2020 winter campaign song for Coca-Cola. In support of the album, Eito embarked on his first concert tour, Together Sukkarakan.

== Promotion ==
=== Package ===
Sukkarakan was released in three physical editions, CD, CD and DVD, and CD and Blu-ray disc. A small bottle of Dolce & Gabbana perfume, named "Ano Kōsui no Mini Bottle" was accompanied with the first shipments of each edition.

=== Tour ===
To promote the album, Eito embarked on his first national concert tour, titled Together Sukkarakan. The singer visited four cities from February 14, 2021 to February 26 of the same year. The show in Tokyo was originally intended to be held on January 31, 2021, however, it was later pushed back to February 26, 2021 due to the staff's COVID-19 contraction.

| Date | City | Country | Venue |
|---|---|---|---|
| February 14, 2021 | Sapporo, Hokkaido | Japan | Penny Lane 24 |
| February 20, 2021 | Umeda, Osaka | Japan | Umeda Club Quattro |
| February 21, 2021 | Fukuoka, Fukuoka | Japan | Drum Logos |
| February 26, 2021 | Shibuya, Tokyo | Japan | Duo Music Exchange |

== Singles ==
"Kōsui" was released independently on April 21, 2019, as the album's lead single. Since the late 2019, "Kōsui" slowly gained populatiry on the social video sharing app TikTok, where the users posted their cover videos of the song. The song eventually entered the Billboard Japan Hot 100 at number 34 in May 2020. The song topped the chart two weeks later and stayed within top ten on the charts for 27 consecutive weeks. As of December 2020, the song has been streamed over 200 million times. The second single from the album, "Hip Hop wa Utaenai" was released on January 25, 2020. "Right Now" was released on October 16, as the album's third single and the singer's first single from a major music label, A.S.A.B. The Ai cover, "Happiness" was released on November 11, 2020 as the album's fourth single.

== Track listing ==
| No. | Title | Writer(s) | Length |
|---|---|---|---|
| 1. | "Boku wa Baka" (僕はバカ) | 8s | 4:22 |
| 2. | "Kōsui" (香水) | 8s | 4:15 |
| 3. | "Happy ni Nareyo" (ハッピーになれよ) | Eito; Rung Hyang | 3:20 |
| 4. | "Chest" (チェスト) | 8s | 5:08 |
| 5. | "Karma" (カルマ) | Eito; Rung Hyang; Shingo. S | 3:29 |
| 6. | "Ritton" (リットン) | Eito; Rung Hyang | 4:23 |
| 7. | "Don't Be Afraid" (featuring Hotdogs) | Eito; Kai; Minor | 5:06 |
| 8. | "Hip Hop wa Utaenai (In-Sist version)" (HIPHOPは歌えない (韻シスト ver.)) | 8s | 4:20 |
| 9. | "Right Now" (ライナウ) | Eito; Rung Hyang | 3:38 |
| 10. | "Suki ni Sureba Iisa" (好きにすればいいさ) | Eito | 4:00 |
| 11. | "Matane (featuring Chinatsu Matsumoto) [Album ver.]" (またね (featuring 松本千夏) [Album ver.]) | Eito; Chinatsu Matsumoto | 4:28 |
| 12. | "Ore wa Ore de Ikiteruyo" (俺は俺で生きてるよ) | 8s | 4:53 |

Bonus tracks
| No. | Title | Writer(s) | Length |
|---|---|---|---|
| 13. | "Happiness" (ハピネス) | Ai Uemura | 4:20 |
| 14. | "Chest (Dokushō)" (チェスト (独唱)) | 8s | 5:29 |
| Total length: | | | 61:17 |

DVD/Blu-ray tracklist
| No. | Title | Writer(s) | Length |
|---|---|---|---|
| 1. | "Eito Story (Acoustic Studio Session)" (瑛人STORY ～Acoustic Studio Session～) |
| 2. | "Kōsui" (Music video) | 8s | 4:15 |
| 3. | "Hip Hop wa Utaenai" (Music video) | 8s | 4:08 |
| 4. | "Hip Hop wa Utaenai (In-Sist version)" (Music video) | 8s | 4:20 |
| 5. | "Right Now" (Music video) | Eito; Rung Hyang | 3:38 |

== Charts ==
=== Weekly charts ===
| Chart (2021) | Peak position |
|---|---|
| Japan Hot Albums (Billboard Japan) | 9 |
| Japanese Albums (Oricon) | 11 |

== Release history ==
List of regions, release dates, formats, labels and references
| Region | Date | Formats | Label | Ref. |
|---|---|---|---|---|
| Japan | December 24, 2020 | digital download; streaming | A.S.A.B | |
| Japan | January 1, 2021 | CD+DVD; CD+Blu-ray; CD | A.S.A.B | |
