= Kira Kira (Ai song) =

2017 single by Ai featuring Naomi Watanabe

Single by Ai featuring Naomi Watanabe (Note: Watanabe is credited as Kanna, the character she portrays in the Japanese comedy Kanna-san!)

from the album Wa to Yo to (Deluxe Edition)
- Language: Japanese; English
- Released: July 6, 2017
- Genre: J-pop
- Length: 3:40
- Label: EMI; Universal
- Songwriter: Ai Uemura
- Producers: Uta; Uemura

Ai singles chronology
"Justice Will Prevail at Last" (2017)	"Kira Kira" (2017)	"Summer Magic" (2019)

Naomi Watanabe singles chronology
"Kira Kira" (2017)	"Kiss Me More" (2022)

Music video
- "Kira Kira" on YouTube

"Kira Kira" (キラキラ; lit. Glitter) is a song written and recorded by Japanese-American singer-songwriter Ai featuring Japanese comedian and actress Naomi Watanabe. It was released to radio on July 6, 2017, and later as a digital single on August 1, 2017. It served as a single from the deluxe version of Ai's eleventh studio album, Wa to Yo.

Upon its release, "Kira Kira" debuted and peaked at number 19 on the Billboard Japan Hot 100. The song was nominated for the Grand Prix award and won the Excellent works Award at the 59th Japan Records Awards.

== Background and release ==
An excerpt of "Kira Kira" served as the theme song for the Japanese drama Kanna-san!. In July 2017, the full version of the song was sent to Japanese J-Wave radio station. Watanabe revealed to J-Wave it was her first full-scale studio recording.

A music video for Kira Kira was released on August 31, 2017.

== Accolades ==
Year	Organization	Award/work	Result	Ref.
2017	59th Japan Record Awards	Grand Prix Award	Nominated	
2017	59th Japan Record Awards	Excellent Work Award	Won	

== Live performances ==
Ai and Watanabe performed "Kira Kira" at the "25th Tokyo Girls Collection". Ai performed the song with Watanabe at the 68th NHK Kōhaku Uta Gassen.

== Music video ==
Directed by Studio Moross' founder Aries Moross, Ai and Watanabe are seen singing behind a green screen with various animations.

== Charts ==
Chart performance for "Kira Kira"
Chart (2017)	Peak position
Japan Digital Singles Chart (Oricon)	29
Japan Hot 100 (Billboard Japan)	19

== Credits and personnel ==
- Ai Uemura – vocals, songwriter, producer, composer
- Naomi Watanabe – vocals
- Uta – producer, composer

== Release history ==
Release history and formats for "Kira Kira"
Region	Date	Format	Label	Ref.
Japan	July 6, 2017	Radio airplay	Universal Japan	
Japan	August 1, 2017	Digital download; streaming	EMI; Universal	
