= Independent (Ai album) =

2012 studio album by Ai

- Standard cover (Note: On the deluxe edition cover, the background is magenta instead of white.)

Studio album by Ai
- Released: February 22, 2012
- Recorded: 2011–2012
- Studios: Candy House Studio (Eagle Rock, Los Angeles); Music Safety Research (Yoyogi, Tokyo); DHC Studio (Tokyo); Tang Studios (Hollywood); Westlake Recording Studios (Hollywood)
- Genres: Dance-pop; R&B
- Length: 40:18
- Languages: Japanese; English
- Labels: EMI Music; EMI
- Producers: TeeFlii; Elliot Washington; Uta; 1500 or Nothin'; Ortha Davis III; Rykeyz; King David "The Future"; Ai

Ai chronology
The Last Ai (2010)	Independent (2012)	Moriagaro (2013)

Singles from Independent
- 1. "Letter in the Sky" Released: October 14, 2011; 2. "Happiness" Released: November 18, 2011; 3. "Beautiful Life" Released: April 6, 2012

Independent (stylized in caps) is the ninth studio album by Japanese-American singer-songwriter Ai. Originally released on February 22, 2012, by EMI Music Japan, and later released outside of Asia on July 17, 2012, the album served as her international debut following a global publishing deal with EMI. Hoping to experiment with new sounds that would expand her music beyond contemporary R&B and hip hop music, Ai worked with multiple American producers alongside long-time collaborator Uta. The final product resulted in an album combining dance-pop and R&B.

The album was supported by the release of three singles, including "Happiness", which became Ai's most successful single since "I'll Remember You" in 2007, receiving two different gold certifications from the Recording Industry Association of Japan (RIAJ). In Japan, Independent debuted at number 2 and spent 33 weeks on the Oricon Albums Chart, having sold over 60 thousand physical units in its first week.

A deluxe reissue of the album was released on November 17, 2012.

== Background and development ==
After the release of The Last Ai in 2010, Ai parted ways with Island Records and Universal Sigma, having signed to EMI Music Japan in June 2011. On December 13 and 14, 2011, Ai was one of the lead acts of the Michael Jackson Tribute Live tributes in Japan. She performed Michael Jackson's vocals in the third act, along with the Jacksons. Her first release under EMI, the digital single "Letter in the Sky" featuring the Jacksons, was the theme song for the event. Densetsu Night, a concert recording for the tour of her previous album, The Last Ai (2010), was also released under EMI prior to the album.

== Writing and production ==
The album was written by Ai, collaborating with American and Japanese producers. Of the 10 tracks, nine featured lyrics exclusively written by Ai, and eight featured input from Ai on the musical melody.

The album was recorded over a period of seven months in Los Angeles, New York City and Tokyo. The bulk of the album was recorded at Eagle Rock, Los Angeles. "Letter in the Sky" was recorded in Hollywood, and "Happiness," "Beyond Your Dream" and "Beautiful Things" were recorded in Tokyo. Ai felt that moving to a new label was a chance to refresh her music. In the album sessions, Ai felt challenged in many ways. "Dance Together," an electronic song, was something she had never thought of making, as she previously thought she did not enjoy the genre. Ai considered "Beautiful Things" as the most vocally challenging song she had recorded. She used much more of her falsetto range on the album than in previous works. The lyrics of the album were more "heartfelt" than her previous albums, in particular "One Love" and "Happiness." "Happiness" was written with the feelings and mindset Ai had in the aftermath of the 2011 Tōhoku earthquake and tsunami.

The album consists of only 10 songs, as she decided it was better to focus on a small number of quality songs. Ai usually felt pressured to record a great number of songs before the album session deadline in the past.

The album was named after its lead track, "Independent Woman."

== Promotion and release ==
"Happiness" (2011)
The preceding single "Happiness" was Ai's most successful single in five years.

"Independent Woman" (2012)
The lead track "Independent Woman" was nominated for best R&B video at the MTV Japan music video awards.

The first digital single from the album, "Letter in the Sky," was released in October 2011. The major promotions of the album centred on the song "Happiness," which was first released in November 2011, and later as a physical single in December 2012. The song was used in a high-profile winter commercial campaign for Coca-Cola. The song was highly successful, receiving two separate gold certifications from the RIAJ. This was her most highly certified single since 2007's "I'll Remember You."

Prior to the album, three digital singles were released. "One Love" and "Beautiful Things" were simultaneously released on February 1, 2012. "Beautiful Things" was used as the ending theme song for the animated film Berserk Golden Age Arc I: The Egg of the High King, based on the manga Berserk. "One Love" was used in Morinaga's 1 Choco for 1 Smile charity campaign.

The leading track, "Independent Woman," was released a week before the album on February 15, 2012. A music video was recorded for the song, which was later nominated for the Best R&B video at the 2012 MTV Video Music Awards Japan. The song was used as the commercial song for Marisol magazine's March and April 2012 TV campaign. "Independent Woman" was featured in the 2012 Wii dance game Just Dance Wii 2, a Japan only game in the Just Dance franchise, as one of the playable tracks.

Ai appeared in a variety of magazines, and on many radio shows to promote her album. These included radio appearances on J-Wave, Nack5 and FM Fuji. She was interviewed in a variety of magazines for the album, including An An, Blenda, Fine, Popteen, Samurai Magazine and Woofin'. A TV special, Ai Special: Independent, was produced and aired on Music On! TV in February 2012.

== Tours ==
Ai supported the album during her Independent tour, held between April and June 2012 across Japan. 23 dates in 23 cities were performed, with the final performed at Tokyo's Nippon Budokan hall on June 22. An additional performance was held in Los Angeles on August 24, 2012, at Club Nokia.

== Critical reception ==
Professional ratings
Review scores
Source	Rating
CD Journal	(favorable)
Hot Express	(favorable)
Listen Japan	(favorable)
Rolling Stone Japan	3.5/5 stars

Critical reception for the album was favorable. The reviewer at Listen Japan was overwhelmed by the strong impressions of all of the tracks, including the "heavy bass and trancey synths" on "Dance Together," "Futuristic Lover" that "shines with '80s style synths." The reviewer felt all the different songs felt extremely modern and trendy, and noted the varied vocals between songs. CD Journal considered the album's "borderless strength and depth" impressive. Of the lead single "Happiness/Letter in the Sky," the reviewer enjoyed both songs, but much preferred "Letter in the Sky," feeling that Jackie Jackson's lead vocals were "loaded with soul." Listen Japan's Morio Mori thought "Happiness"' "catchy hook and autotuned voice" could make hearts dance. Takuro Ueno of Rolling Stone Japan awarded the album 3.5 stars out of 5, feeling that it was an album that expressed Ai's "pronounced personality" very well. Tetso Hiraga of Hot Express, however, was more impressed by the album's lyrical themes of "the potential of mankind" and unity than the song.

== Chart performance ==
Independent debuted at number two in its first week, selling 21,000 copies. This was the highest position Ai had reached with a studio album since What's Goin' On Ai in 2006. The album charted for 21 weeks in the top 300, eventually tripling its first week to sell 61,000 copies. This was Ai's best selling original album in five years, since Don't Stop Ai in 2007.

== Track listing ==
Independent – Standard edition
No.	Title	Writer(s)	Producer(s)	Length
1.	"Dance Together"	Ai Uemura; Christian Joel Jones	Uemura; TeeFlii	3:44
2.	"Independent Woman"	Uemura; Elliot Washington	Uemura; Washington	3:04
3.	"Happiness" (ハピネス)	Uemura	Uemura; Uta	4:14
4.	"Unbalance" (アンバランス, Anbaransu)	Uemura; Masse; Daniel Thomas; Brandon Lowery	Uemura	3:57
5.	"Futuristic Lover"	Uemura; Larrance Dopson	Uemura; 1500 or Nothin'	3:21
6.	"W/U"	Uemura; Dopson	Uemura; 1500 or Nothin'	3:51
7.	"Beyond Your Dream" (ユメノムコウ, Yume no Mukou)	Uemura; Otha Davis III	Uemura	4:07
8.	"One Love"	Uemura; Uta	Uemura; Uta	4:15
9.	"Beautiful Things" (ウツクシキモノ)	Uemura; Ryan Williamson; Sean Fenton	Ry Keyz	4:41
10.	"Letter in the Sky" (featuring The Jacksons)	Uemura; Curtis Jenkins; King David "The Future"	Uemura; King David "The Future"	4:44
Total length:				40:18

iTunes bonus track
No.	Title	Writer(s)	Length
11.	"Happiness" (Live at Garden)	Uemura	4:24

Independent Deluxe Edition – bonus tracks
No.	Title	Writer(s)	Producer(s)	Length
11.	"Beautiful Life"	Uemura	Uemura; Uta	3:16
12.	"Happiness (Summer Reggae Remix by Mighty Crown)"	Uemura	Uemura; Uta	5:03
13.	"Happiness (English Version)"	Uemura; Latisha Hyman	Uemura; Uta
14.	"Happiness (Smile Version)"	Uemura	Uemura; Uta

Independent Deluxe Edition – bonus live tracks
No.	Title	Writer(s)	Length
1.	"Dance Together"	Uemura; Jones
2.	"Independent Woman"	Uemura; Washington
3.	"Happiness"	Uemura
4.	"Unbalance"	Uemura; Masse; Thomas; Lowery
5.	"Futuristic Lover"	Uemura; Dopson
6.	"W/U"	Uemura; Dopson
7.	"Beyond Your Dream"	Uemura; Davis III
8.	"One Love"	Uemura; Uta
9.	"Beautiful Things"	Uemura; Williamson; Fenton
10.	"Letter in the Sky" (featuring The Jacksons)	Uemura; King David "The Future"
11.	"Beautiful Life"	Uemura
12.	"Tribute Medley" (Human Nature, I'm Every Woman, Billie Jean, I Have Nothing, I Just Can't Stop Loving You)	Steve Porcaro; John Bettis; Ashford & Simpson; Michael Jackson; David Foster; Linda Thompson

== Personnel ==
Personnel details were sourced from Independent's liner notes booklet.

Performance credits

- Ai Carina Uemura – vocals, background vocals
- Jackie Jackson – vocals (#10)
- Marlon Jackson – vocals (#10)
- Tito Jackson – vocals (#10)
- Jesse Josefsson – guitar (#10)
- Dan Manzoor – bass (#10)
- Masse – guitar (#4)

Visuals and imagery

- Noriko Goto – stylist
- Itaru Hirama – photographer
- Akemi Ono – hair, make-up
- Tycoon Graphics – art direction, design

Technical and production

- 1500 or Nothin – producer (#5–#6)
- Ai Carina Uemura – producer (#1–#8, #10)
- Tom Coyne – mastering
- Claudio Cueni – mixing (#1–#7, #10), recording (#1–#3, #5–#6, No. 8, #10)
- Otis Davis III – track programming (#7)
- D.O.I. – mixing (#3, #8–#9)
- Alexandria Dopson – vocal arrangement (#5)
- James Fauntleroy – vocal arrangement (#6)
- TeeFlii – producer (#1)
- Keisuke Fujimaki – vocal recording (#7)
- Hiroyoshi Hanajima – recording (#3)
- Ryosuke Kataokevvocal recording (#9)
- Ry Keyz – production (#9)
- Masse – programming (#4)
- Storm – vocal arrangement (#7)
- Uta – producer (#3, #8)
- Elliot Washington – producer (#2)

== Charts ==
Chart performance for Independent
Chart (2012)	Peak position
Japan Albums (Oricon)	2
Japan Monthly Albums (Oricon)	13

== Certifications ==
Certifications and sales for Independent
Region	Certification	Certified units/sales
Japan (RIAJ)	Gold	100,000^{^}
^{^} Shipments figures based on certification alone.

== Release history ==
Release history and formats for Independent
Region	Date	Format(s)	Version	Label	Ref.
Japan	February 22, 2012	CD; digital download; streaming	Original	EMI Music	
Taiwan	March 9, 2012	CD; digital download; streaming	Original	Gold Typhoon	
South Korea	March 20, 2012	CD; digital download; streaming	Original	Warner Korea	
United States	July 17, 2012	CD; digital download; streaming	Original	EMI Music; EMI Records	
Germany	July 17, 2012	CD; digital download; streaming	Original	EMI Music; EMI Records	
France	July 17, 2012	CD; digital download; streaming	Original	EMI Music; EMI Records	
United Kingdom	July 17, 2012	CD; digital download; streaming	Original	EMI Music; EMI Records	
Various	November 7, 2012	CD	Deluxe	EMI Music	
