= Happy Christmas/Heiwa/Miracle =

"Happy Christmas / Heiwa / Miracle"
- Maxi CD cover version

Single by Ai
- Language: Japanese; English
- Released: November 2, 2016
- Recorded: 2016
- Label: EMI; Universal
- Songwriter(s): Ai Uemura; Carlos Jenkins; Matthew Quinney; Obi Eble; Uche Eble
- Producer(s): Uta; Uemura; Da Beatfreakz; Tha Hitbangaz

Ai singles chronology
"I'm the Champion" (2016)	"Happy Christmas / Heiwa / Miracle" (2016)	"Justice Will Prevail at Last" (2017)

Music video
- "Happy Christmas" on YouTube

"Happy Christmas / Heiwa / Miracle" (Note: Japanese: ハッピークリスマス/Heiwa/ミラクル) is a triple A-side single by Japanese-American singer-songwriter Ai, released November 2, 2016, by EMI Records. The release served as her first physical single since "Voice" and was her first triple a-side single.

"Happy Christmas" served as commercial tie-in while "Heiwa" served as the theme song for the Japanese version of Storks and "Miracle" served as the theme song for Fuji TV drama Medical Team Lady da Vinci no Shindan.

Upon its physical release, the maxi single peaked at number 55 on the Japanese Oricon Singles chart. "Miracle" peaked at number 84 on the Billboard Japan Hot 100 and "Happy Christmas" peaked at number 90 while "Heiwa" failed to enter the Japan Hot 100. The three songs originally were intended to be singles for Ai's eleventh studio album Wa to Yo (2017), but subsequently were not included on the original release of the album. In October 2017, the three songs were included on a deluxe release of Wa to Yo.

== Background ==
Following the success of "Minna ga Minna Eiyū", EMI Records announced Ai's 2015 greatest hits album, The Best would be reissued. The label also released "I'm the Champion", a digital single originally intended as the lead single for Wa to Yo which failed to enter any charts. In September 2016, EMI Records announced Ai would provide a theme song for Storks' Japanese release. Titled "Heiwa", the song was originally released digitally as a promotional single. A few weeks later, a triple A-side maxi single was announced by EMI, set for release on Ai's birthday. Another set of compilations titled The Feast. Best was announced to be released the same day. "Happy Christmas" was used for a commercial tie-in starring Emi Takei. "Miracle" served as the theme song for Fuji TV drama Medical Team Lady da Vinci no Shindan.

== Live performances ==
Ai performed the songs during her 2016 tour, "The Best Tour". She additionally performed the three songs at Nippon Budokan. Ai also performed "Happy Christmas" at the "Futako Tamagawa Rise Special Live 2016" event at Futako Tamagawa Rise in Tokyo.

== Music videos ==
Music videos for "Miracle" and "Happy Christmas" were released in December 2016.

== Track listing ==
Happy Christmas / Heiwa / Miracle – Maxi single
No.	Title	Writer(s)	Producer(s)	Length
1.	"Happy Christmas" (ハッピークリスマス)	Ai Uemura	Uta; Uemura	5:23
2.	"Heiwa"	Carlos Jenkins; Matthew Quinney; Obi Eble; Uche Eble; Uemura	Da Beatfreakz; Tha Hitbangaz	3:53
3.	"Miracle" (ミラクル)	Uemura	Uta; Uemura	3:49
Total length:				13:06

== Charts ==
Chart performance for "Happy Christmas / Heiwa / Miracle"
Chart (2016)	Peak position
Japan (Oricon)	55

Chart performance for "Happy Christmas"
Chart (2016)	Peak position
Japan (Japan Hot 100)	90

Chart performance for "Miracle"
Chart (2016)	Peak position
Japan (Japan Hot 100)	84

== Credits and personnel ==
Credits adapted from Wa to Yo liner notes.

- Ai Carina Uemura – lead vocals, songwriting, producer
- Uta – producer, songwriting
- Da Beatfreakz – producer
- Tha Hitbangaz – co–producer
- Carlos Jenkins – songwriting
- Matthew Quinney – songwriting
- Obi Eble – songwriting
- Uche Eble – songwriting
- Randy Merrill – mastering
- Tom Coyne – mastering

== Release history ==
Release history and formats for "Happy Christmas / Heiwa / Miracle"
Region	Date	Format(s)	Version	Label	Ref.
Various	October 11, 2016	Digital download; streaming	"Miracle" (digital promotional single)	EMI; Universal	
Various	November 2, 2016	Digital download; streaming	Maxi single	EMI; Universal	
Japan	November 2, 2016	CD	Maxi single	Universal Japan	
