= It's All Me, Vol. 1 =

2020 extended play by Ai

- Digital cover (Note: On physical releases, the catalog number is present below the title of the EP.)

EP by Ai
- Released: July 8, 2020
- Recorded: 2019
- Studio: The Watche (Los Angeles, California); Studio MSR (Tokyo, Japan); True Color Studio (Taipei, Taiwan); MSR Lab (Tokyo)
- Genre: J-pop; reggaeton; hip-hop
- Length: 22:50
- Language: Japanese; English; Spanish; Mandarin
- Label: EMI
- Producer: Ai Uemura; Uta; Rogét Chahayed; Taylor Dexter; Silver Age; The Rascals; Vava; Jin

Ai chronology
Kansha!!!!! – Thank You for 20 Years New and Best (2019)	It's All Me, Vol. 1 (2020)	It's All Me, Vol. 2 (2021)

Singles from It's All Me, Vol. 1
- 1. "Summer Magic" Released: May 17, 2019; 2. "You Never Know" Released: August 9, 2019; 3. "I'm Coming Home" Released: January 14, 2020; 4. "Good as Gold" Released: March 23, 2020; 5. "Gift" Released: April 24, 2020

It's All Me, Vol. 1 is the first extended play by Japanese-American singer-songwriter Ai. It was released on July 8, 2020, through EMI Records. Primarily recorded in Los Angeles, the EP was preceded by the release of five digital singles, including the lead single "Summer Magic".

== Background ==
The songs are all different and I was worried about the title, but every song is my own. That's why I added it to mean "everything is myself'"

— Ai reflecting on the title of the EP

To celebrate her twenty-year anniversary in the music industry and the then upcoming 2020 Summer Olympics, Ai began production for an album in 2019. Additionally, a greatest hits album, Kansha!!!!! – Thank You for 20 Years New and Best, was released by EMI on November 6, 2019, which included tracks previously not available in countries outside of Asia and new material.

The EP's first single, "Summer Magic", was released in May 2019. "Summer Magic" gained attention in Japan following a poster advertisement of the song on display at Shinjuku Station. The advertisement featured a screenshot of a search engine result of "Ai", with artificial intelligence being the top result while a cut-off photo of Ai herself is at the bottom of the query. "Summer Magic" was later used as a commercial tie-in for the Amazon Echo. The second single, "You Never Know", was released in August 2019, featuring Taiwanese group MJ116. The third single, "I'm Coming Home", was released in January 2020 and the fourth single, "Good as Gold" in March 2020. The fifth single, "Gift" was released in April 2020.

In May 2020, Ai announced on her social media the title and release date of the EP. Pre-add for Apple Music and Spotify began on June 26, 2020.

== Track listing ==
It's All Me, Vol. 1 track listing
No.	Title	Writer(s)	Producer(s)	Length
1.	"Gift"	Ai Uemura	Uta; Uemura	3:39
2.	"Good as Gold"	Uemura; Lindy Robbins; Rogét Chahayed; Taylor Dexter	Chahayed; Dexter; Uemura	3:19
3.	"Kokoro" (featuring Jenn Morel and Joelii)	Uemura; Jenn Morel; Gedrin Joely Morel; Mario Parra; Di'Jonn Gary Grizzell	Silver Age	3:18
4.	"Summer Magic" (Japanese version)	Uemura; Khris Riddick-Tynes; Leon Thomas III	The Rascals; Uemura	3:37
5.	"You Never Know" (featuring MJ116)	Uemura; MJ116	Vava	4:37
6.	"I'm Coming Home"	Uemura; Jin; Ruri Matsumura	Jin; Uemura	5:00
Total length:				22:50

It's All Me, Vol. 1 – limited edition DVD bonus
No.	Title	Director(s)	Length
1.	"Summer Magic" (music video)	Yudai Maruyama; Haga Yohei
2.	"You Never Know" (feat. MJ116) (music video)	Maruyama; Yohei
3.	"I'm Coming Home" (music video)	Yu Irie
4.	"Gift" (Lyric video)	D&A Music
5.	"Ai's Message & Special Medley" (Stay Home Version)	Uemura

== Personnel ==
Credits adapted from Tidal and album's liner notes.

=== Musicians ===
- Ai Carina Uemura – lead vocals, songwriting, production
- Uta – production, songwriting
- Rogét Chahayed – production, songwriting
- Taylor Dexter – production, songwriting
- Lindy Robbins – songwriting
- Jenn Morel – featured artist, songwriting
- Gedrin Joely Morel – featured artist, songwriting
- Mario Parra – songwriting
- Dijonn Gary Grizzell – songwriting
- Silver Age – production
- Leon Thomas III – songwriting
- Khris Riddick-Tynes – songwriting
- The Rascals – production
- MJ116 – featured artist
- Vava – producer, composer
- Mu Yuan Lin – songwriting, vocals
- Wen Jie Zhou – songwriting, vocals
- Yu Rong Chen – songwriting, vocals
- Jin – production
- Ruri Matsumura – songwriting
- Futoshi Kawashima – arrangement

=== Technical ===
- Keisuke Fujimaki – vocal engineering
- Keisuke Suwa – vocal engineering
- Shiori Maruoka – vocal engineering
- Zachary Lin – vocal engineering
- Mario Parra – vocal engineering
- D.O.I – mixing
- Boris Milan – mixing
- Randy Merrill – mastering
- Ai Carina Uemura – vocal engineering
- MJ116 – vocal engineering

=== Visuals and imagery ===
- Ran Tondabayahsi – art director
- Yousuke Tsuchida – designer
- Hiroki Watanabe – photographer
- Moemi Odo – retouching
- Ai Carina Uemura – hair, makeup artist
- Akemi Ono – hair, makeup artist
- Noriko Gota – stylist
- Akio Kawabata – design coordination
- Shuma Saito – design coordination

== Charts ==
Chart performance for It's All Me, Vol. 1
Chart (2020)	Peak position
Japanese Albums (Oricon)	18
Japanese Combined Albums (Oricon)	27
Japanese Digital Albums (Oricon)	27
Japanese Hot Albums (Billboard Japan)	20

== Release history ==
Release history and formats for It's All Me, Vol. 1
Region	Date	Format(s)	Version	Label	Ref.
Various	July 8, 2020	Digital download; streaming	Standard	EMI; Universal	
Japan	July 8, 2020	CD	Standard	EMI; Universal Japan; Def Jam	
Japan	July 8, 2020	CD; DVD	Limited	EMI; Universal Japan; Def Jam	
