= 59th Japan Record Awards =

2017 Japanese music awards ceremony

- Date: 30 December 2017
- Location: New National Theatre Tokyo, Tokyo, Japan
- Hosted by: Yūki Amami, Shinichiro Azumi
- Website: http://www.tbs.co.jp/recordaward/

Television/radio coverage
- Network: TBS
- Viewership: 14.4%

The 59th Japan Record Awards was held on 30 December 2017. The Tokyo Broadcasting System Television network televised the show live from the New National Theatre Tokyo in Tokyo. Radio broadcast was through TBS Radio. The broadcast ran from 18:30 (JST) to 22:00 (JST). Yūki Amami and Shinichiro Azumi hosted the ceremony for the second time. The nominations and award winners were announced by TBS on 16 November 2017.

The 59th Japan Record Award went to idol group Nogizaka46 for their song "Influencer". This was the second consecutive win for an artist under the Sony Music Entertainment Japan label (after Kana Nishino in 2016). Tsubaki Factory won the Best New Artist Award.

The average audience rating for the second part (19:00 to 22:00) was 14.4%, down 0.1% from the previous year's broadcast.

== Presenters ==
- Yūki Amami
- Shinichiro Azumi (TBS Announcer)

=== Progress announcers ===
- Ai Etō (TBS Announcer)
- Yumi Furuya (TBS Announcer)

=== Radio relay host ===
- Kengo Komada (TBS Announcer)

== Nominees and winners ==
=== Grand Prix ===
- "Influencer"
  - Artist: Nogizaka46
  - Lyrics: Yasushi Akimoto
  - Composition: Shinya Sumida
  - Arranger: Apazzi
  - Producer: Yasushi Akimoto
  - Management company: Nogizaka46 LLC
  - Record Company: Sony Music Entertainment Japan

=== Excellent works Award ===
Also the Grand Prix nominations

- Kana Nishino – "Te o Tsunagu Riyuu"
- AKB48 – "Negaigoto no Mochigusare"
- AAA – "Life"
- Keyakizaka46 – "Kaze ni Fukaretemo"
- Nogizaka46 – "Influencer"
- Hiroshi Miyama – "Otoko no Ryuugi"
- Kiyoshi Hikawa – "Otoko no Zesshou"
- Sekai no Owari – "Rain"
- Daichi Miura – "Excite"
- Ai – "Kira Kira feat. Kanna"

=== Best New Artist Award ===
- Tsubaki Factory

=== New Artist Award ===
Also the Best New Artist nominations

- Tsubaki Factory
- Takuya Nagazawa
- Nobu
- Unione

=== Special Award ===
- Yū Aku
- Namie Amuro
- Yōko Oginome and Tomioka High School Dance Club – "Dancing Hero (Eat You Up)"
- Yuzu
- Akiko Wada

=== Best Singer Award ===
- Yoshimi Tendo

=== Recommendation Award ===
Awarded by the Japan Composer's Association

- Konomi Mori

=== Special Honour Award ===
- Miyako Ootsuki

=== Achievement Award ===
- Yukihiko Itō (composer)
- Ryūtarō Konishi (music reporter)
- Jun Suzuki (composer)
- Kyōhei Tsutsumi (composer)
- Shōhei Mozu (lyricist)
- Reiko Yukawa (music critic)

=== Special Achievement Award ===
- Hirooki Ogawa (composer)
- Hiroshi Kamayatsu (singer)
- Jun Kitahara (composer)
- Kōmei Sone (composer)
- Masaaki Hirao (composer)
- Tooru Funamura (composer)
- Peggy Hayama (singer)

=== Composer Award ===
- Katsuhide Sugiyama – "Zutto, Futari de" (singer: Leo Ieiri)

=== Lyricist Award ===
- Hideaki Tokunaga – "Baton" (singer: Hideaki Tokunaga)

=== Arranger Award ===
- Yasutaka Nakata – "Ryō Star", "Harajuku Iyahoi" (singer: Kyary Pamyu Pamyu)

=== Best Album Award ===
- Suchmos – The Kids

=== Excellence Album Award ===
- Keisuke Kuwata – Garakuta
- Kumiko with Kazemachi Review – Déraciné
- Ren Takada – Night Riders Blues
- Hiromi Uehara x Edmar Castañeda – Live In Montreal

=== Planning Award ===
- Yutaro Miura – I'm Home
- Hanawa – Ogifu-san
- The KanLeKeeZ – G.S. meets The KanLeKeeZ
- Seiko Matsuda – Seiko Jazz
- Walt Disney Records/Avex Entertainment – Beauty and the Beast Original Soundtrack
- Hiroshi Itsuki – Toru Funamura Tribute Album: Eien no Funamura Melody
