= Ai singles discography =

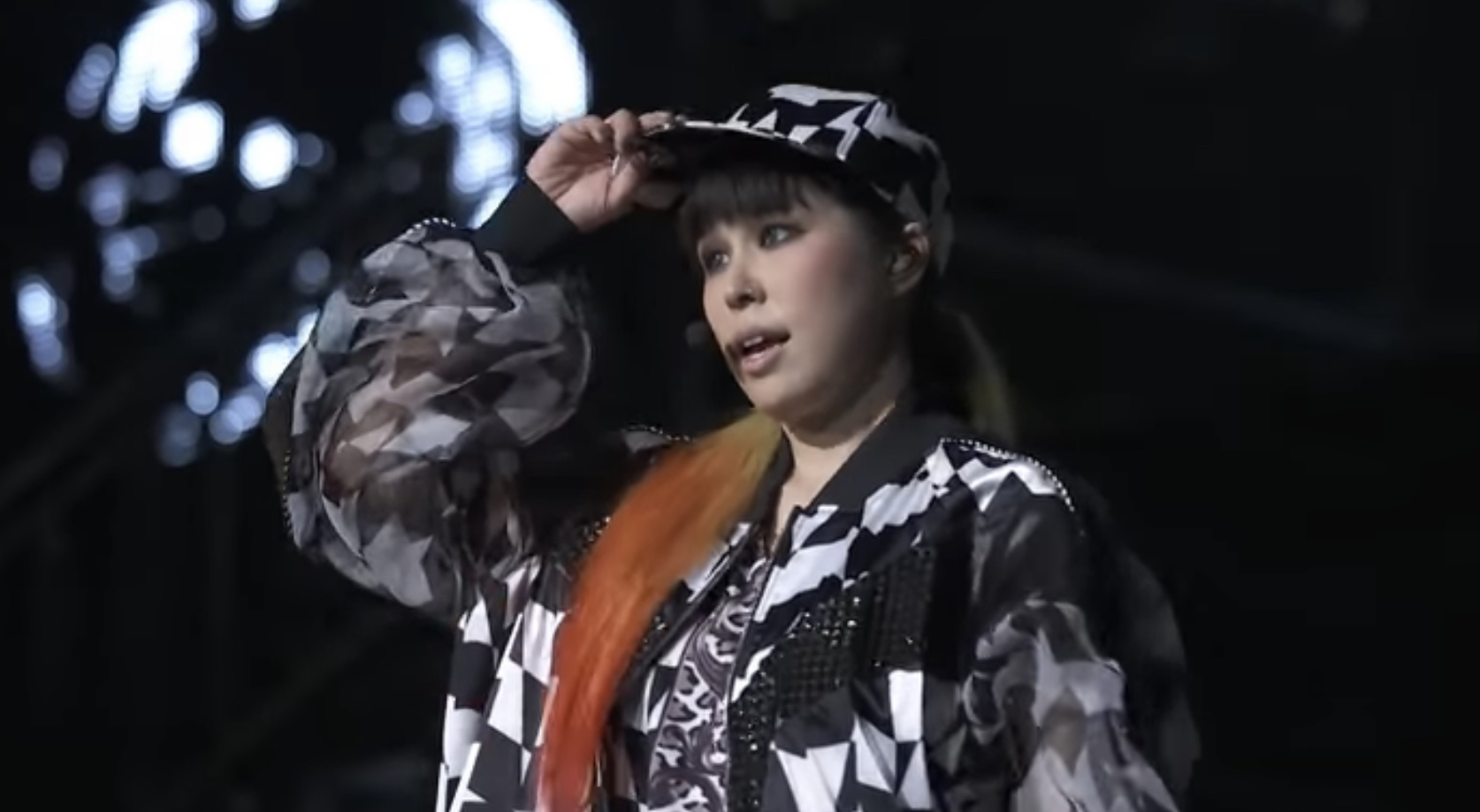
- Ai performing at the Best Tour, 2016
- As lead artist: 62
- As featured artist: 23
- Promotional singles: 27

The discography of Japanese-American singer-songwriter Ai consists of 62 singles as a lead artist, 23 singles as a featured artist, and 27 promotional singles. On the Oricon Singles Chart, Ai has six top-ten singles, her highest peak being number two. On the Billboard Japan Hot 100, eight of Ai's singles have reached the top-ten, her highest peak position at number two.

Ai had her first Oricon Singles Chart entry with "Shining Star" from her debut studio album, My Name Is Ai (2001). Her fourth studio album, Mic-a-holic Ai (2005), featured "Story", a sleeper hit that went on to become one of best-selling multi-format singles in Japan. Ai's 2006 single "Believe" became her highest charting single on the Singles Chart, peaking at number 2. Ai's first entry on the Billboard Japan Hot 100 was "Taisetsu na Mono", peaking at number nine. In 2011, she released "Happiness", a campaign song for The Coca-Cola Company. The song went on to become one of her best performing singles in the 2010s with 3 million digital sales reported from the RIAJ, peaking at number 2 on the Japan Hot 100. "Voice", from Moriagaro (2013) tied with "Happiness" in terms of peak chart positions, also reaching number two on the Japan Hot 100.

In 2016, Ai released "Minna ga Minna Eiyū", originally a 100-second song used for promotional campaigns by au. The song was exclusively released to au's music services. Becoming a sleeper hit, the 100-second version received a Platinum certification from the RIAJ. Ai later recorded and released a full version of "Minna ga Minna Eiyū" in February 2016. The full version peaked at number four on the Japan Hot 100 and was certified Gold. Ai scored another top-five hit in 2016 with "No More', a duet recorded with Atsushi. She followed up the singles with her first triple A-side single, "Happy Christmas / Heiwa / Miracle". The maxi single went on to peak at number fifty-five and as of 2025 was her last physical single release.

Ai's 2017 single "Kira Kira" featuring comedian Naomi Watanabe from a deluxe reissue of Wa to Yo (2017) peaked at number nineteen and was nominated for the Grand Prix Award at the 59th Japan Record Award. Since 2019, Ai's singles have diminished in sales, primarily charting in sub-charts of the Japan Hot 100 and Oricon charts. "Aldebaran" from Dream (2022) became her first charting single on the Japan Hot 100 since "Kira Kira", debuting and peaking at number thirty-seven. It went on to become her first top-ten single on the Oricon Digital Singles Chart and being certified Gold by the RIAJ.

== As lead artist ==
=== 2000s ===
List of singles released in the 2000s decade, showing selected chart positions, certifications, and associated albums
Title	Year	Peak chart positions		Certifications	Album
Title	Year	JPN	JPN Hot (Note: Sources for chart positions on the Billboard Japan Hot 100: "Taisetsu na Mono"; "Crazy World"; "So Special"; "Okuribito"; "You Are My Star"; "Broken Strings"; "Fake"; "Wavin' Flag"; "Still..."; "Nemurenai Machi"; "Stronger"; "Love You Need You"; "Wonder Woman"; "Letter in the Sky"; "Happiness"; "All You Need Is Love"; "One Love"; "Independent Woman"; "Beautiful Life"; "Voice"; "Dear Mama"; "After the Storm"; "Hanabi"; "Let It Be"; "Be Brave"; "Minna ga Minna Eiyū"; "No More"; "Happy Christmas"; "Miracle"; "Aldebaran"; "Bad Bitch Bigaku")	Certifications	Album
"Cry, Just Cry"	2000	—	—		My Name Is Ai
"U Can Do"	2001	—	—		My Name Is Ai
"Shining Star"	2001	98	—		My Name Is Ai
"Last Words" (solo or featuring Joe Budden)	2003	27	—		Original Ai
"Thank U"	2003	37	—		Original Ai
"My Friend" (マイフレンド)	2003	35	—		Original Ai
"Merry Christmas Mr. Lawrence"	2003	35	—		Original Ai
"After the Rain"	2004	32	—		2004 Ai
"E.O."	2004	23	—		2004 Ai
"Watch Out!" (featuring Afra and Tucker)	2004	62	—		2004 Ai
"365" (featuring Deli)	2005	20	—		Mic-a-holic Ai
"Crayon Beats"	2005	40	—		Non-album single
"Story"	2005	8	7 (Note: Position for 2009 edition of the song, "Story (Re-born)". Original version also charted at number 67 in 2009.)	RIAJ (ringtone): 3× Million; RIAJ (digital): 2× Million; RIAJ (streaming): Platinum; RIAJ (physical): Gold	Mic-a-holic Ai
"Believe"	2006	2	—	RIAJ (ringtone): Million; RIAJ (digital): Gold; RIAJ (physical): Gold	What's Goin' On Ai
"I Wanna Know"	2006	9	—		What's Goin' On Ai
"Brand New Day"	2007	13	—		Don't Stop Ai
"I'll Remember You"	2007	13	—	RIAJ (digital): Gold; RIAJ (physical): Gold	Don't Stop Ai
"One"	2007	18	—		Don't Stop Ai
"Taisetsu na Mono"	2008	22	9	RIAJ (digital): Gold	Don't Stop Ai
"So Special" (Note: Two versions of "So Special" have been released with both Ai and Atsushi as primary artists. "Version Ai" features a different melody, structure and lyrics than "Version Exile".) (with Exile Atsushi)	2008	15	14	RIAJ (digital): Gold	Viva Ai & Exile Entertainment Best
"Okuribito"	2008	15	58		Viva Ai
"You Are My Star"	2009	36	11		Viva Ai
"—" denotes items which were released before the creation of the Billboard Japan Hot 100, or items that did not chart.

=== 2010s ===
List of singles released in the 2010s decade, showing selected chart positions, certifications, and associated albums
Title	Year	Peak chart positions		Certifications	Album
Title	Year	JPN	JPN Hot	Certifications	Album
"Fake" (featuring Namie Amuro)	2010	8	5	RIAJ (digital): Gold	The Last Ai
"Still..." (featuring AK-69)	2010	15	27		The Last Ai
"Nemurenai Machi"	2010	60	53		The Last Ai
"Stronger" (featuring Miliyah Kato)	2010	26	30		The Last Ai
"Letter in the Sky" (featuring the Jacksons)	2011	14	36		Independent
"Happiness"	2011	14	2	RIAJ (digital): 3× Platinum; RIAJ (streaming): Gold	Independent
"Beautiful Life"	2012	—	65		Independent
"Voice"	2013	13	2	RIAJ (digital): Platinum	Moriagaro
"Dear Mama"	2013	—	6	RIAJ (digital): Gold	Moriagaro
"Let It Be" (with Tee)	2014	84	47		Non-album single
"Story (English Version)"	2014	—	—		Big Hero 6
"Be Brave" (with Exile Atsushi)	2015	7	12		40
"Minna ga Minna Eiyū"	2016	—	4	RIAJ (digital): Platinum (Note: Certification for the 100 second version); RIAJ (digital): Gold	The Best
"No More" (with Exile Atsushi)	2016	7	4		40
"I'm the Champion"	2016	—	—		Wa to Yo
"Happy Christmas"	2016	55	90		Wa to Yo
"Heiwa"	2016	55	—		Wa to Yo
"Miracle"	2016	55	84		Wa to Yo
"Justice Will Prevail at Last"	2017	—	74		Wa to Yo
"Kira Kira" (featuring Naomi Watanabe)	2017	— (Note: "Kira Kira" did not enter the Oricon Singles chart, but peaked at number 29 on the Oricon Digital Singles chart.)	19		Wa to Yo
"Summer Magic"	2019	—	—		It's All Me, Vol. 1
"You Never Know"	2019	—	—		It's All Me, Vol. 1
"Baby You Can Cry"	2019	—	— (Note: "Baby You Can Cry" did not enter the Billboard Japan Hot 100 chart, but peaked at number 92 on the Billboard Japan Download Songs chart.)		Kansha!!!!!
"—" denotes items that did not chart or items that were ineligible to chart because no physical edition was released.

=== 2020s ===
List of singles released in the 2020s decade, showing selected chart positions, certifications, and associated albums
Title	Year	Peak chart positions		Certifications	Album
Title	Year	JPN Dig.	JPN Hot	Certifications	Album
"I'm Coming Home"	2020	—	—		It's All Me, Vol. 1
"Good as Gold"	2020	—	—		It's All Me, Vol. 1
"Gift"	2020	44	— (Note: "Gift" did not enter the Billboard Japan Hot 100 chart, but peaked at number 53 on the Billboard Japan Download Songs chart.)		It's All Me, Vol. 1
"Not So Different" (solo or featuring Awich)	2020	—	— (Note: "Not So Different" did not enter the Billboard Japan Hot 100 chart, but peaked at number 79 on the Billboard Japan Download Songs chart.)		It's All Me, Vol. 2
"The Moment" (featuring Yellow Bucks)	2021	—	—		Dream
"In the Middle" (featuring Daichi Miura)	2021	41	— (Note: "In the Middle" did not enter the Billboard Japan Hot 100 chart, but peaked at number 42 on the Billboard Japan Download Songs chart.)		Dream
"Aldebaran"	2021	6	37	RIAJ (digital): Gold; RIAJ (streaming): Gold	Dream
"Start Again"	2022	—	—		Respect All
"Respect All"	2023	—	—		Respect All
"Life Goes On"	2023	—	—		Respect All
"Rise Together" (with Yaffle featuring OZworld)	2024	—	—		Non-album single
"Tide" (with Mori Calliope)	2024	—	—		Phantomime
"My Wish"	2025	—	—		TBA
"Lucky I Love You"	2026	—	—		TBA
"It's You"	2026	—	—		TBA
"Still on My Road"	2026	—	—		TBA
"It's Ai"	2026	TBA	TBA		TBA
"—" denotes items that did not chart.

== As featured artist ==
List of singles as featured artist, with selected chart positions and certifications, showing year released and album name
Title	Year	Peak chart positions		Certifications	Album
Title	Year	JPN	JPN Hot	Certifications	Album
"One Last Kiss" (Mao Denda featuring Ai)	2001	91	—		Non-album single
"Luv Ya" (Sphere of Influence featuring Ai)	2002	72	—		The Influence
"Uh Uh......" (Suite Chic featuring Ai)	2003	22	—		When Pop Hits the Fan
"Gold Digga" (Michico featuring Ai)	2003	—	—		Non-album singles
"Voice of Love (Ue o Muite Arukō)" (上を向いて歩こう; "Walk While Looking Up") (among Voice of Love Posse)	2003	25	—		Non-album singles
"No Generation Gap" (Char featuring Ai)	2006	83 (Note: Charted on DVD chart.)	—		Non-album singles
"Do What U Gotta Do" (Zeebra featuring Ai, Namie Amuro, Mummy-D)	2006	—	—	RIAJ (digital): Gold	The New Beginning
"Crazy World" (Anna Tsuchiya featuring Ai)	2008	19	26	RIAJ (digital): Gold	Nudy Show!
"Home Sweet Home" (Gicode featuring Ai and Jamosa)	2009	77	— (Note: Charted at number 66 on the Billboard Japan Hot Singles Sales chart.)		SP & ST
"Broken Strings" (James Morrison featuring Ai)	2009	—	19		Songs for You, Truths for Me (Japan Edition)
"Ai no Uta" (アイノウタ; "Love Song") (MC2 featuring Ai and Co-key)	2010	—	—		Energy
"Wavin' Flag (Coca Cola Celebration Mix) (Sekai ni Hitotsu no Hata)" (ウェイヴィン・フラッグ コカ・コーラ(R)・セレブレイション・ミックス～世界に一つの旗; "One Flag in the World") (K'naan featuring Ai)	2010	99	7		Troubadour: Champion Album
"This Love" (Thelma Aoyama featuring Ai)	2010	—	—		Love! 2
"Love You Need You" (The Bawdies featuring Ai)	2011	3	3		Live the Life I Love
"Wonder Woman" (Namie Amuro featuring Ai and Anna Tsuchiya)	2011	—	5	RIAJ (digital): Platinum	Checkmate!
"O2" (Miho Fukuhara featuring Ai)	2011	—	—		The Soul Extreme EP
"Blue" (Zeebra featuring Ai)	2011	119	—		Black World/White Heat
"All You Need Is Love" (among Japan United with Music)	2012	11	11		Non-album singles
"Shakunage-iro no Sora" (しゃくなげ色の空; "Dark-colored sky") (Nagabuchi Tsuyoshi featuring Ai)	2020	—	84		Non-album singles
"Magnetic" (Kaela Kimura featuring Ai)	2022	—	—		Magnetic
"Alive in Tokyo" (B.Slade featuring Ai)	2023	—	—		Non-album single
"Bad Bitch Bigaku" (remix) (Bad Bitch 美学; "Bad Bitch Aesthetic") (Awich featuring Nene, Lana, Mari, Ai and Yuriyan Retriever)	2023	—	87	RIAJ (streaming): Gold	United Queens
"Nakama" (Zedd featuring Ai)	2025	26	— (Note: "Nakama" did not enter the Billboard Japan Hot 100 chart, but peaked at number 82 on the Billboard Japan Download Songs chart.)		Non-album single
"—" denotes items which were released before the creation of the Billboard Japan Hot 100, items that did not chart or items that were ineligible to chart because no physical edition was released.

== Promotional singles ==
List of promotional singles, with selected chart positions and certifications, showing year released and album name
Title	Year	Peak chart positions	Album
Title	Year	JPN Hot	Album
"Playboy" (featuring Dabo)	2003	—	Original Ai
"2Hot"	2003	—	Original Ai
"Hot Spot" (featuring Uzi)	2004	—	Feat. Ai
"Sunshine"	2005	—	Mic-a-holic Ai
"People in the World"	2009	—	Viva Ai
"For My Sister" (featuring Judith Hill)	2010	—	The Last Ai
"One Love"	2012	37	Independent
"Beautiful Things"	2012	— (Note: "Beautiful Things" did not enter the Billboard Japan Hot 100 chart, but peaked at number 67 on the Billboard Japan Adult Contemporary Airplay chart and 83 on the Hot Top Airplay chart.)	Independent
"Independent Woman"	2012	16	Independent
"After the Storm" (featuring Che'Nelle)	2013	40	Moriagaro
"Sogood"	2013	— (Note: "Hanabi" did not enter the Billboard Japan Hot 100 chart, but peaked at number 93 on the Billboard Japan Adult Contemporary Airplay chart.)	Moriagaro
"Hanabi"	2013	9	Moriagaro
"Come Together (Wasurenaide)" (忘れないで; "Don't Forget") (Note: Charity theme song of National Student Organization Summit, to children in Fukushima disaster area.)	2013	—	Non-album single
"Run Free" (with Miliyah Kato and Verbal)	2013	—	Motto Moriagaro
"Feel It"	2017	—	Wa to Yo
"Music Is My Life"	2017	—	Wa to Yo
"Happiness (Gospel Version)"	2019	—	Kansha!!!!!
"Laughin' Medicine" (ラフィン・メディスン)	2019	—	Kansha!!!!!
"Kokoro" (featuring Jenn Morel and Joelii)	2020	—	It's All Me, Vol. 1
"Yūsha Tachi"	2020	—	Inspire
"Hope"	2021	—	It's All Me, Vol. 2
"First Time" (featuring Riehata)	2022	—	Dream
"World Dance" (featuring Chanmina)	2023	—	Respect All
"Whatever"	2023	—	25th the Best - Alive
"Minna ga Minna Eiyū 2024"	2024	— (Note: "Minna ga Minna Eiyū 2024" did not enter the Billboard Japan Hot 100 chart, but peaked at number 69 on the Billboard Japan Download Songs chart.)	Non-album singles
"A Procession of the Living" (生者の行進) (with Ringo Sheena)	2024	—	Carnival
"Untitled" (featuring Pushim and Dabo)	2024	—	Non-album single
"—" denotes items which were released before the creation of the Billboard Japan Hot 100, or items that did not chart.

== Other appearances ==
List of non-studio album or guest appearances that feature Ai, that were not released as singles or promotional singles
Title	Year	Album
"Baby Shine" (Heartsdales featuring Ai and Verbal)	2002	Radioactive
"Luv Song" (Jin featuring Ai)	2002	—N/a
"Luv Song (Reo's Prophet Mix)" (Jin featuring Ai)	2002	Notes of Soul
"Somebody's Girl" (Ken Hirai featuring Ai)	2002	Life Is...
"Uh Uh...... (Remix)" (Suite Chic featuring Ai, Bigzan and P.H.)	2003	When Pop Hits the Lab
"Rollin' On (Remix)" (Double featuring Ai)	2003	—N/a
"Fatal Attraction" (51 -Goichi- featuring Ai)	2003	51st Dimension: The Yang
"Golden Mic (Remix)" (Zeebra featuring Kashi da Handsome, Ai, Dohzi-T and Hannya)	2003	Tokyo's Finest
"Baby Shine (Deckstream Remix)" (Heartsdales featuring Ai)	2003	Sugar Shine
"Jonan Ondo" (JONAN音頭; "Jonan Work Song") (Gicode featuring Ai)	2003	Edocig
"My Friend (L'arpege Noir Mix)" (Double featuring Ai)	2003	Wonderful
"Super Backshoen (Yes, Sir)" (スーパーバックシャン, Sūpā Bakkushan) (Dabo featuring Ai)	2003	Diamond
"My Friend (R. Yamaki Remix)" (Double featuring Ai)	2004	Too Wonderful
"Thunder Break Beats" (Kaminari-Kazoku. featuring Ai, Hab I Scream and Dabo)	2004	330 More Answer No Question
"Gold Digga (DJ Hazime Remix)" (Michico featuring Ai)	2004	—N/a
"Starstruck (The Return of the Luvbytes)" (M-Flo featuring Ai, Emi Hinouchi and Rum (Heartsdales))	2004	Astromantic
"Welcome 2 da Party" (DJ Watarai featuring Hi-D and Ai)	2004	Harlem Ver. 3.0
"Angel" (エンジェル, Enjeru) (Boy-Ken featuring Ai)	2004	Everythin' Is Everythin'
"Starstruck (Sakai, Asuka Savannh Remix)" (M-Flo featuring Ai, Emi Hinouchi and Rum (Heartsdales))	2004	Astromantic Charm School
"Hot Spot" (Uzi featuring Ai)	2004	No. 9
"Holiday" (DJ Masterkey featuring Chris and Ai)	2005	The Life Entertainment Presents Daddy's House Vol. 3
"Uh... Uh... (Ver. 2K5)" (Suite Chic featuring Ai)	2005	Jhett
"Nettaiya" (熱帯夜; "Tropical Night") (Ai featuring Typewriter from 254)	2005	Tokyo Engi: TKO Hiphop Original Soundtrack'
"Tell Me" (Deli featuring Hannya, 565 and Ai)	2005	Time 4 Some Action'
"What Is a Life" (Ai & Rin Oikawa)	2006	Kiraware Matsuko no Uta-tachi (Memories of Matsuko soundtrack)
"Believe (Drama Instrumental)"	2006	Iryū Team Medical Dragon Original Soundtrack
"Nettaiya (East Up Remix)" (East Up Line Stars featuring Ai)	2006	E Star
"Oh Yeah!" (Rain featuring Ai)	2006	Eternal Rain / Rain's World
"Bitter Life" (Giant Swing featuring Ai)	2007	Giant Swing Deli
"My Friend (Liga Oriente Remix)"	2007	Remistura
"Are You a Performa" (Trey Songz featuring Ai)	2007	Trey Day (Japanese Edition)
"People in the World (Movie Short Version)"	2009	Lalapipo Official Compilation Album
"Home Sweet Home (Album Ver.)" (Gicode featuring Ai, Jamosa)	2009	SP&ST
"If You Really Love Me" (Flipsyde featuring Ai)	2009	State of Survival
"Beat It" (Afra featuring Ai)	2009	Heat Beat
"Birthday Song" (Ai featuring Anty the Kunoichi (produced by Hi-D))	2009	Special Calling: Session 2
"Kon'ya wa Birthday Bash" (今夜はバースデーバッシュ; "Tonight's a Birthday Bash") (Deli featuring Ai and Dabo)	2009	The Bible 4 Survival
"Kon'ya wa Birthday Bash (Autotune Ver.)" (Deli featuring Ai and Dabo)	2009	The Bible 4 Survival
"Change the World" (Rudebwoy featuring Ai)	2010	Best Combination Magnum Mix
"Believe (DNA Instrumental Remix)"	2010	Ai no Uta Winter Remix
"It's OK" (AK-69 featuring Ai)	2011	The Red Magic
"Hit the Road Jack" (The Bawdies featuring Ai)	2011	—N/a
"Movie" (L-Vokal featuring Chinza Dopeness, Ai)	2011	Livin'
"Forever (Kimi to Dattara)" (～君とだったら; "If I Were with You") (Skoop on Somebody featuring Ai)	2011	Distance
"O2 (Seiji Basement Mix)" (Miho Fukuhara featuring Ai)	2012	—N/a
"You Are My Reason" (Miho Fukuhara featuring Ai)	2012	The Best of Soul Extreme
"Born This Way" (DJ PMX featuring Maccho (Ozrosaurus) and Ai)	2012	The Original II
"Show It Off" (DJ Lead featuring Jim Jones and Ai)	2013	—N/a
"Hope (Tokyo Tribe Anthem)" (Young Dais (N.C.B.B), Simon, Y's and Ai)	2014	Tokyo Tribe Original Soundtrack
"No Music No Life" (Jun. K featuring Ai)	2014	Love & Hate
"I'll Be There with You" (Miliyah Kato featuring Ai and Thelma Aoyama)	2014	Muse
"You Are Not Alone" (Jin featuring Ai)	2014	Luv Groove
"Final Distance"	2014	Utada Hikaru no Uta
"Off Love" (Sly & Robbie and Spicy Chocolate featuring Ai)	2015	The Reggae Power
"One Day" (Thelma Aoyama featuring Miliyah Kato and Ai)	2016	Pink Tears
"Soul 2 Soul" (Kubota Toshinobu featuring Ai)	2016	The Baddest: Collaboration
"Crime and Punishment"	2018	Fruit Défendu
"Ichiban" (Luna featuring Ai)	2019	Mi Vida Loca
"Yume no Saki e (Next Dream)" (夢の先へ~Next Dream~) (Noritake Kinashi featuring Ai)	2019	Kinashi Funk the Best
"Yūsha Tachi"	2020	Inspire
"Never Change" (DJ Ryow featuring Ai, AK-69 and Hannya)	2021	Still Dreamin'
"Colorful" (Note: The Japanese branch of Coca-Cola formed "Team Coca-Cola", a musical project in support of the Tokyo 2020 Olympic and Paralympic Games. (Performed by Ai, Motohiro Hata, Little Glee Monster, Daichi Miura, Perfume, Taemin (Shinee), Miyavi, Nasty C, Sabrina Carpenter, Ayumu Imazu, Blue Vintage, Mizki, Sanari, Chikuzen Sato (Sing Like Talking) as Colorful).) (among various artists)	2021	—N/a
"Good Time" (Kumi Koda featuring Ai)	2022	Heart
"Show Me True Love" (MC Tyson featuring Ai and T-Pablow)	2023	The Message 5
"Mukaijima" (Bad Hop featuring Yzerr, Anarchy, Benjazzy T-Pablow and Ai)	2024	Bad Hop
"To You" (Noritake Kinashi featuring Ai, Crystal Kay, Double, Miho Fukuhara, Full of Harmony, Kazuki Hayashi, Jay'ed, Kôhei Matsushita, Mhiro, and Harumi Tsuyuzaki)	2024	Kinashi Soul
"Rasen Freestyle '25" (DJ Ryow featuring Hannya, Socks, Eyden, Carz, Yellow Bucks, Ai and Equal)	2025	It Was All a Dream
