= 25th the Best – Alive =

2025 greatest hits album by Ai

- Standard physical edition cover

Greatest hits album by Ai
- Released: February 19, 2025
- Recorded: 2002–2024
- Length: 135:49
- Label: EMI
- Producers: Uta; Ai; Neko Saito; C3prod; Kazunori Fujimoto; DJ Ryow; Space Dust Club; Steph Pockets; Elliot Washington; Yaffle; Daichi Miura; Desert Storm; Lofey; Skane; DJ Watarai; Jin; 2 Soul; Avedon; Scott Storch; Tomoko Ida; Carsten Lindberg; Joachim Svare; T. Kura; Jeff Miyahara; Jonas Jeberg; Anders Bagge; DJ Yutaka; Gakushi; Zedd; Ellis

Ai chronology
Respect All (2023)	25th the Best – Alive (2025)	Who's Ai (2027)

Alternative cover
- Digital and limited edition cover

25th the Best – Alive is the fifth greatest hits album by Japanese-American singer-songwriter Ai. Originally released digitally on February 19, 2025, via EMI Records, the album was later released physically on February 26, 2025. It contains material from Ai's second to thirteenth studio albums alongside three non-album singles.

== Background ==
Ai released her thirteenth studio album Respect All on August 23, 2023. After completing her tour of the same name, she released the promotional single "Whatever". In 2024, Ai was featured on a series of albums, including Ringo Sheena's Carnival and Mori Calliope's Phantomime. In July, she released "Untitled" featuring Pushim and Dabo, a mashup of Ai's song "Whatever" and the remix version of Pushim's "I Wanna Know You" featuring Dabo. In November, Ai made a series of posts regarding her 25th anniversary of her debut on social media.

== Release and promotion ==
On November 2, 2024, Universal Music Japan launched a website for Ai's 25th anniversary with the message "We are Alive!!!". On November 29, the website was updated, unveiling the Alive Tour, which began in May 2025. Alongside the tour announcement, Ai shared on social media she would be releasing a greatest hits album, 25th the Best – Alive. Universal Japan later announced limited copies of "Story" and "Happiness" on 7-inch single vinyls, which were released the same day as 25th the Best – Alive.

Various editions of the album were announced with limited first press goods. The standard edition features 18 tracks while the deluxe version includes 34 tracks split on two discs. A limited three disc version of the album includes live footage from Ai's Respect All Tour alongside tracks from the deluxe version.

On January 31, "Nakama", the ending theme song for Dragon Ball Daima, was added as a bonus track on the album. On February 19, 25th the Best – Alive was surprise released digitally. The digital release features the deluxe edition track listing as well as the cover art used on the physical limited-edition version.

== Commercial performance ==
Upon its digital release, 25th the Best – Alive debuted at number 17 on the Oricon Digital Albums chart. The album also debuted at number 15 on the Billboard Japan Download Albums chart.

After its physical release, 25th the Best – Alive debuted at number nine on the Oricon Daily Albums chart. It later fell the next day to number 11. The album later debuted at number 13 on the weekly Oricon Albums Chart as well as debuting at number 15 on the Combined Albums Chart. On the Billboard Japan charts, 25th the Best – Alive failed to enter the Hot Albums chart, however it peaked at number seven on the Download Albums chart, becoming Ai's first top-ten album on the chart.

== Track listing ==
25th the Best – Alive – standard edition
No.	Title	Writer(s)	Original album	Length
1.	"Story"	Ai Carina Uemura	Mic-a-holic Ai
2.	"Aldebaran"	Naotarō Moriyama	Dream
3.	"Happiness"	Uemura	Independent
4.	"Minna ga Minna Eiyū"	Makoto Shinohara
5.	"Dear Mama"	Uemura	Moriagaro
6.	"Kira Kira" (featuring Naomi Watanabe)	Uemura	Wa to Yo
7.	"My Friend"	Uemura; Kazunori Fujimoto	Original Ai
8.	"The Moment" (featuring Yellow Bucks)	Uemura; Kazu Sakaguchi	Dream
9.	"Life"	Uemura; Stephanie Fountain	Original Ai
10.	"Last Words"	Uemura	Original Ai
11.	"I Wanna Know"	Uemura	What's Goin' On Ai
12.	"Voice"	Uemura	Moriagaro
13.	"Not So Different" (remix) (featuring Awich)	Uemura; Rachel West; Vincent van den Ende; Scott Storch; Akiko Urasaki	It's All Me, Vol. 2
14.	"You Are My Star"	Uemura; Uta	Viva Ai
15.	"Nemurenai Machi"	Uemura	The Last Ai
16.	"Believe"	Uemura	What's Goin' On Ai
17.	"Music Is My Life"	Uemura	Wa to Yo
18.	"Nakama" (Zedd featuring Ai)	Anton Zaslavski; Uemura

25th the Best – Alive – digital / deluxe edition
No.	Title	Writer(s)	Original Album	Length
1.	"Story"	Uemura	Mic-a-holic Ai
2.	"Aldebaran"	Moriyama	Dream
3.	"Happiness"	Uemura	Independent
4.	"Minna ga Minna Eiyū"	Shinohara
5.	"Dear Mama"	Uemura	Moriagaro
6.	"Kira Kira" (featuring Naomi Watanabe)	Uemura	Wa to Yo
7.	"Hanabi"	Uemura	Moriagaro
8.	"My Friend"	Uemura	Original Ai
9.	"The Moment" (featuring Yellow Bucks)	Uemura; Sakaguchi	Dream
10.	"Fake" (featuring Namie Amuro)	Uemura	The Last Ai
11.	"Life"	Uemura; Fountain	Original Ai
12.	"Independent Woman"	Uemura	Independent
13.	"World Dance" (featuring Chanmina)	Uemura; Mina Otomonai; Yaffle	Respect All
14.	"In the Middle" (featuring Daichi Miura)	Uemura; Miura; Uta	Dream
15.	"Last Words"	Uemura	Original Ai
16.	"I Wanna Know"	Uemura	What's Goin' On Ai
17.	"E.O."	Uemura; 2Soul	2004 Ai
18.	"Voice"	Uemura	Moriagaro
19.	"Not So Different" (remix) (featuring Awich)	Uemura; West; Ende; Storch; Urasaki	It's All Me, Vol. 2
20.	"Respect All"	Uemura; Bob James; Tomoko Ida	Respect All
21.	"Thank U"	Uemura; Emanuel Officer; Carsten Lindberg; Joachim Svare	Original Ai
22.	"Music"	Uemura; T. Kura	What's Goin' On Ai
23.	"Sunshine"	Uemura; T. Kura	Mic-a-holic Ai
24.	"Be with You"	Uemura; Julian Le	Dream
25.	"Whatever"	Uemura; Uta
26.	"You Are My Star"	Uemura; Uta	Viva Ai
27.	"Nemurenai Machi"	Uemura	The Last Ai
28.	"Family"	Uemura; Jeff Miyahara; Jeremy Soule	The Last Ai
29.	"So Special" (Version Ai) (with Atsushi)	Uemura; Atsushi Satō	Viva Ai
30.	"Wavin' Flag (Coca Cola Celebration Mix)" (Version Ai)	Andrew Bloch; Bruno Mars; Edmond Dunne; Jean Duval; Keinan Abdi Warsame; Phillip Lawrence	The Last Ai
31.	"I'll Remember You"	Uemura; Jonas Jeberg; Anders Bagge; Sylvia Bennett-Smith; Marc Smith	Don't Stop Ai
32.	"Believe"	Uemura	What's Goin' On Ai
33.	"Music Is My Life"	Uemura	Wa to Yo
34.	"Nakama" (Zedd featuring Ai)	Zaslavski; Uemura

25th the Best – Alive – limited edition DVD / Blu-ray bonus live performances from the Respect All Tour
No.	Title	Length
1.	"Opening"
2.	"Respect All"
3.	"Moriagaro"
4.	"Hanabi"
5.	"The Moment" (featuring Yellow Bucks)
6.	"Start Again"
7.	"Wavin' Flag"
8.	"Be with You"
9.	"Dear Mama"
10.	"Beautiful Things"
11.	"Life Goes On"
12.	"Little Hands"
13.	"Nemurenai Machi"
14.	"Be Brave"
15.	"Story"
16.	"Aldebaran"
17.	"I Wanna Know"
18.	"Voice"
19.	"Not So Different" (remix)
20.	"World Dance"
21.	"Lasting Peace Song" (encore)
22.	"Whatever" (encore)
23.	"Minna ga Minna Eiyū" (encore)
24.	"Happiness" (encore)

Notes

- The album's limited edition CD+DVD release consists of three discs.
- "Respect All" interpolates Bob James' 1982 instrumental song "Shamboozie" written by James.

== Charts ==
=== Weekly charts ===
Weekly chart performance for 25th the Best – Alive
Chart (2025)	Peak position
Japanese Albums (Oricon)	13
Japanese Combined Albums (Oricon)	15
Japanese Download Albums (Billboard Japan)	7
Japanese Top Albums Sales (Billboard Japan)	12

=== Monthly charts ===
Monthly chart performance for 25th the Best – Alive
Chart (2025)	Position
Japanese Albums (Oricon)	35

== Release history ==
Release history and formats for 25th the Best – Alive
Region	Date	Format(s)	Version	Label	Ref.
Various	February 19, 2025	Digital download; streaming	Standard	EMI	
Japan	February 26, 2025	CD	Standard	EMI; Def Jam	
Japan	February 26, 2025	CD	Deluxe	EMI; Def Jam	
Japan	February 26, 2025	CD; DVD	Limited	EMI; Def Jam	
Japan	February 26, 2025	CD; Blu-ray	Limited	EMI; Def Jam	
Japan	February 26, 2025	CD (Amazon exclusive)	Standard	EMI; Def Jam	
Japan	February 26, 2025	CD (Amazon exclusive)	Deluxe	EMI; Def Jam	
Japan	February 26, 2025	CD (Amazon exclusive); DVD (Amazon exclusive)	Limited	EMI; Def Jam	
Japan	February 26, 2025	CD (Amazon exclusive); Blu-ray (Amazon exclusive)	Limited	EMI; Def Jam	
Japan	February 26, 2025	CD (Universal Japan exclusive)	Standard	Universal Japan	
Japan	February 26, 2025	CD (Universal Japan exclusive)	Deluxe	Universal Japan	
Japan	February 26, 2025	CD (Universal Japan exclusive); DVD (Universal Japan exclusive)	Limited	Universal Japan	
Japan	February 26, 2025	CD (Universal Japan exclusive); Blu-ray (Universal Japan exclusive)	Limited	Universal Japan	
Japan	May 14, 2025	Vinyl	Standard	EMI; Def Jam	
