= Lucky I Love You =

2026 single by Ai

Single by Ai
- Language: Japanese; English
- Released: February 27, 2026
- Recorded: 2025
- Length: 3:59
- Label: EMI
- Songwriters: Ai Carina Uemura; Uta
- Producers: Ai; Uta

Ai singles chronology
"My Wish" (2025)	"Lucky I Love You" (2026)	"It's You" (2026)

Music video
- "Lucky I Love You" on YouTube

"Lucky I Love You" (Japanese: ラッキーアイラブユー) is a song recorded by Japanese-American singer-songwriter Ai, released on February 27, 2026, via EMI Records. Commissioned by Nestlé Japan, "Lucky I Love You" is the fifth song Ai recorded for the company to use in promotional campaigns for Kit Kats.

== Background and release ==
Ai has previously recorded and provided songs used for commercial tie-ins by Nestlé Japan, including "First Time", "Start Again", a cover of Queen's "We Are the Champions", and "Whatever". In October 2025, Ai begun teasing a new song, "Lucky I Love You", on her social media. On February 13, 2026, Ai announced the release date of "Lucky I Love You" following various teaser videos. The song was released as a digital single on February 27, 2026.

== Promotion ==
A promotional pre-add campaign was held by Universal Music Japan from February 13 to February 26, 2026. Participants that pre-added "Lucky I Love You" were given a bonus digital photo of Ai. A second promotional campaign was launched from February 27 to March 31, 2026, where 10 winners would receive a special recording of "Lucky I Love You".

== Music video ==
The music video for "Lucky I Love You" premiered on Ai's YouTube channel on February 27. The video was directed by Mess, who previously directed music videos for Ai's "Not So Different" and "Rise Together".

== Live performances ==
Ai performed "Lucky I Love You" on TBS' Count Down TV.

== Credits and personnel ==
- Ai Carina Uemura – vocals, production
- Uta – production, instruments
- D.O.I – mixing, immersive mixing

== Release history ==
Release history and formats for "Lucky I Love You"
Region	Date	Format	Label	Ref.
Various	February 27, 2026	Digital download; streaming	EMI	
