= Respect All =

2023 studio album by Ai

- Standard cover

Studio album by Ai
- Released: August 23, 2023
- Recorded: 2022–2023
- Studio: Studio MSR (Tokyo, Japan); MSR Lab; St'em Studio; Studio Mech
- Length: 35:20
- Label: EMI
- Producer: Uta; Ai Carina Uemura; Tomoko Ida; TeeFlii; Yaffle; Julian Le; C3prod; Rinzo; Tenyu Fukaya; DJ Acko; Yuki Kishida

Ai chronology
Dream (2022)	Respect All (2023)	25th the Best – Alive (2025)

Alternative cover
- Limited CD album cover

Singles from Respect All
- 1. "Start Again" Released: October 3, 2022; 2. "Respect All" Released: May 22, 2023; 3. "Life Goes On" Released: August 3, 2023

Respect All is the thirteenth studio album by Japanese-American singer-songwriter Ai, released on August 23, 2023, by EMI Records. Announced in June 2023, the album includes Nestlé Japan's Kit Kat campaign song, "Start Again", as well as "Life Goes On", the image song for the Japanese film Haru ni Chiru.

== Background ==
Ai released her twelfth studio album, Dream, on February 23, 2022. Featuring nine tracks, the studio album was her first in five years since Wa to Yo (2017), and also was her shortest length studio album.

Speculation of Ai's thirteenth studio album began after a teaser of an unreleased song was included on the "Respect All" music video. Within a few weeks, Universal Music Japan announced the title of Ai's thirteenth studio album. Five of ten songs were announced on June 9, including a cover of Bill Wither's "Lean on Me", which Ai performed live at the 49th G7 summit. On social media, Ai announced the album would include "Start Again", "Respect All" and "Life Goes On". On July 19, the full track listing and artwork was revealed.

== Cover artwork ==
The standard cover of Respect All bears resemblance to Ai's second studio album, Original Ai (2003). The limited physical edition of the album features a different cover artwork.

== Release and promotion ==
Respect All was released on August 23, 2023. Prior to its release, Universal Japan revealed the Universal Music Store would feature limited first press bonus goods, as well as an application lottery ticket for a chance to see Ai live. Additional limited bonus goods were later announced on July 26, including a keychain, postcard, poster and coin bag.

In promotion of the album, Ai embarked on her twelfth headlining tour titled after the album.

== Commercial performance ==
Respect All debuted at number 9 on the Oricon Daily Albums chart for August 22, 2023. The album later fell to number 12 on August 23. On the weekly Oricon charts, Respect All debuted and peaked at number 17 on both the Albums and Digital Albums chart. The album debuted and peaked at number 30 on the Combined Albums chart. Respect All currently is Ai's 18th best-selling album of twenty ranked, selling less units than her previous studio album, Dream.

On the Billboard Japan charts, Respect All debuted and peaked at number 17 on the Hot Albums chart. The album later fell down to number 89 on the chart for the week of September 6.

== Track listing ==
Respect All track listing
No.	Title	Writer(s)	Producer(s)	Length
1.	"Respect All"	Ai Carina Uemura; Bob James; Tomoko Ida	Ida	2:58
2.	"Eh Eh Eh"	Uemura; Christian Joel Jones	TeeFlii	2:11
3.	"World Dance" (featuring Chanmina)	Uemura; Mina Otomonai; Youki Kojima	Yaffle	3:41
4.	"River"	Uemura; Julian Le	Le	4:12
5.	"Life Goes On"	Uemura; Ida	Ida	5:30
6.	"Little Hands" (指を握る小さな手, Yubi o Nigiru Chīsana te)	Uemura; C3prod	C3prod	2:53
7.	"We Are Alive"	Uemura; Rinzo; Tenyu Fukaya	Rinzo; Fukaya	2:53
8.	"Start Again"	Uemura; Uta	Uta; Uemura	4:17
9.	"Happy Birthday to You"	Uemura; Don Kim	DJ Acko	2:03
10.	"Lean on Me"	Bill Withers	Yuki Kishida	4:38
Total length:				35:20

Respect All – limited edition DVD / Blu-ray bonus live performances from the Dream Tour
No.	Title	Writer(s)	Length
1.	"Not So Different" (remix) (featuring Awich)	Uemura; Rachel West; Vicent van den Ende; Scott Storch
2.	"Voice"	Uemura
3.	"Welcome Rain"	Naoki Yamata
4.	"Last Words"	Uemura
5.	"Independent Woman"	Uemura; Elliot Washington
6.	"Story"	Uemura
7.	"Dear Mama"	Uemura
8.	"Dear Papa"	Uemura; C3prod
9.	"So Special"	Uemura; Atsushi Satō
10.	"For My Sister"	Uemura; Judith Hill; Uta
11.	"People in the World"	Uemura; DJ Watarai; Uta
12.	"Brand New Day" / "Fake" (Medley)	Uemura; Jonas Jeberg; Simon Brenting; Damon Sharp; Greg Lawson; George Tashiro
13.	"Be with You"	Uemura; Le
14.	"It's Show Time!!!"	Uemura; T. Kura
15.	"In the Middle"	Uemura; Daichi Miura; Uta
16.	"Dance Together" / "Moriagaro" (Medley)	Uemura; Jones; Jeremy Phillip Felton
17.	"First Time" / "My Baby" / "The Moment" / "Let It Go" (Medley)	Uemura; Felisha "Fury" King; Fallon King; Victoria Mwangi; Asia Bryant; Lloyd Polite Jr.; Sean "Pen" McMillion; Ralph "Vintage" Jeanty; Kazu Sakaguchi; DJ Ryow; Space Dust Club; Cordell Broadus; DJ2High; Uta; Tynice Hinton
18.	"Uh Uh....."	Michico; Yakko; Uemura
19.	"We Have a Dream"	Uemura; Nelson Babin-Coy; Kim; Uta
20.	"Start Again" (encore)	Uemura; Uta
21.	"Aldebaran" (encore)	Naotarō Moriyama
22.	"Happiness" (encore)	Uemura
23.	"Ai Dream Tour Documentary Film"

Notes

- "Respect All" is alternatively titled as "Respect" (リスペクト) in Asia.
- "Respect All" interpolates Bob James' 1982 instrumental song "Shamboozie" written by James.
- "World Dance" and "We Are Alive" are stylized in all upper cased letters.
- The album's limited edition CD+DVD package consists of three discs.

== Personnel ==
Credits adapted from album's liner notes and Tidal.

Musicians

- Ai Carina Uemura – vocals
- Heiwa – additional vocals (1)
- Yuki Kishida – keyboards (1, 5)
- DJ Hirakatsu – turntable (1)
- Robert "Bubby" Lewis – synth bass (2)
- Azumi Takahashi – additional vocals (10)
- Tohsuke Uematsu – additional vocals (10)
- Takeshi Iwasaki – violin, viola (7)
- Mina Otomonai – vocals (3)

Technical

- D.O.I – mixing (1, 2, 5, 6, 8)
- Masahito Komori – mixing (3)
- Taji Okuda – mixing (10), vocal recording
- John Davis – mastering (1, 4–6, 8)
- Andrew Baldwin – mastering (2, 3, 7, 9, 10)
- Uta – recording arrangement (8)
- Tomoko Ida – recording arrangement (1, 5)
- Yaffle – recording arrangement (3)
- TeeFlii – recording arrangement (2)
- Julian Le – recording arrangement (4)
- C3prod – recording arrangement (6)
- Rinzo – recording arrangement (7)
- Tenyu Fukaya – recording arrangement (7)
- Don Kim – recording arrangement (9)
- Yuki Kishida – recording arrangement (10)
- Keisuke Fujimaki – vocal recording
- Shiori Maruoka – vocal recording
- Shohei Ishikawa – vocal recording
- Jigg – vocal recording (3)

Visuals and imagery

- Toshiya Ohno – art direction
- Sachi Uemura – photographer
- Shoji Uchiyama – design
- Akemi Ono – hair, makeup
- Noriko Goto – stylist
- Hiroki Hisajima – CGI
- Miyuyim – calligraphy

== Charts ==
Chart performance for Respect All
Chart (2023)	Peak position
Japanese Albums (Oricon)	17
Japanese Combined Albums (Oricon)	30
Japanese Hot Albums (Billboard Japan)	17

== Release history ==
Release history and formats for Respect All
Region	Date	Format(s)	Version	Label	Ref.
Various	August 23, 2023	Digital download; streaming	Standard	EMI; Universal	
Japan	August 23, 2023	CD	Standard	EMI; Universal Japan; Def Jam	
Japan	August 23, 2023	CD; DVD	Limited	EMI; Universal Japan; Def Jam	
Japan	August 23, 2023	CD; Blu-ray	Limited	EMI; Universal Japan; Def Jam	
