= Motto Moriagaro =

2013 reissued album by Ai

Studio album (reissue) by Ai
- Released: November 20, 2013
- Recorded: 2012–2013
- Studio: Studio MSR (Tokyo); Studioforesta (Tokyo); The Studio (West Hollywood); Wink2 Studio (Tokyo); Da Co-op Studios (Atlanta); Platinum Sound Recording Studio (New York City); Area 51 (NYC)
- Genre: Dance-pop; R&B; hip hop
- Length: 64:26
- Language: Japanese; English
- Label: EMI Japan
- Producer: De-Capo; Uta; Michico; D.Clax; C3prod; Jerry Duplessis; Fifty1 Fifty; Ai

Ai chronology
Moriagaro (2013)	Motto Moriagaro (2013)	The Best (2015)

Motto Moriagaro (stylized in caps) is a reissue of Japanese–American singer-songwriter Ai's tenth studio album, Moriagaro (2013). It was released on November 20, 2013, by EMI Records Japan, four months after the original album. The reissue features two new songs, including promotional single "Run Free" featuring Miliyah Kato and Verbal, two remixes and a piano version of "Dear Mama". For physical release, a second disc includes special DJ mixes by DJ Hirakatsu.

== Background and release ==
Ai previously released her tenth studio album, Moriagaro, in June 2013. In October 2013 it was revealed the album would be reissued, titled Motto Moriagaro. Two of the bonus tracks previously were used in TV commercials prior to the release of the album reissue. "Get Your Hands Up" was used as the Ya-man Dancing EMS CM song and "Run Free" was used as a song promoting Reebok Classic.

Similar to the original album, recording took place mostly in Tokyo, as well as in West Hollywood, Atlanta and New York City. The album was primarily produced by longtime collaborator Uta, who Ai has worked with since 2009 and various American producers.

== Tours ==
Ai's Moriagaro Tour began in October in Kanagawa, Japan, and included 33 dates. The final concert was held on December 18, 2013, at the Nippon Budokan in Tokyo.

== Track listing ==
Credits adapted from the liner notes of Moriagaro and Tidal.

Motto Moriagaro track listing
No.	Title	Writer(s)	Producer(s)	Length
1.	"Moriagaro" (featuring Jeremih)	Ai Uemura; Jeremy Phillip Felton	Uemura; De-Capo	3:22
2.	"Don't Turn Me Off"	Michico; Scoopbop	Michico; Uta	3:46
3.	"Voice"	Uemura	Uta; Uemura	5:13
4.	"Hanabi"	Uemura	Uta; Uemura	4:01
5.	"My Baby" (featuring Lloyd)	Victoria Mwangi; Asia Bryant; Lloyd Polite Jr.; Sean "Pen" McMillion; Ralph "Vintage" Jeanty	D.Clax	3:36
6.	"Dear Mama" (ママへ "Mama e")	Uemura	C3prod; Uemura	4:00
7.	"Sogood"	Uemura	Uta; Uemura	3:18
8.	"Gotta Get Mine" (featuring Bridget Kelly)	Uemura; Blush; Akene Dunkley; Arden Altino; Jerry Duplessis	Jerry Duplessis	3:29
9.	"After the Storm" (featuring Che'Nelle)	Matthew "Damario" Quinney; Joseph Macklin; Carlos "Los" Jenkins, David "Davix" Foreman; Dashawn "Happie" White; Thomas "Tom Jack" Jackson	Fifty1 Fifty	3:40
10.	"For You" (Piano Version)	Uemura	Fifty1 Fifty	4:28
11.	"My Place"	Uemura	Uta; Uemura	4:00
12.	"Top of the World"	Quinney; Macklin; Derrick Curtis Vines; Jenkins; Foreman; White	Fifty1 Fifty	3:33
13.	"Get Your Hands Up"	Jenkins; Macklin	Jenkins; Macklin	1:23
14.	"Run Free" (featuring Miliyah Kato and Verbal)	Uemura; Kato; Ryu Yeong-gi	Lucas Valentine; H.SU	4:48
15.	"Gotta Get Mine" (English Version featuring Bridget Kelly)	Uemura; Blush; Dunkley; Altino; Duplessis	Duplessis	3:32
16.	"Dear Mama" (Piano Version)	Uemura	Uta; Uemura
17.	"Happiness" (Giving Version)	Uemura	Uta; Uemura	4:13
Total length:				64:26

Max Moriagaro – Special DJ Mix by DJ Hirakatsu
No.	Title	Writer(s)	Producer(s)	Length
1.	"Moriagaro Tour Intro"			1:17
2.	"Show It Off" (DJ Lead featuring Jim Jones & Ai)	Uemura; DJ Lead	Nao the Laiza	1:17
3.	"Don't Turn Me Off"	Michico; ScoopBop	Michico; Uta	2:00
4.	"Moriagaro"	Uemura; Felton	Uemura; De-Capo	2:20
5.	"I Wanna Know"	Uemura	DJ Watarai; Jin	2:11
6.	"EO"	Uemura	2Soul	2:03
7.	"Like a Bird" (featuring Corn Head)	Uemura; Corn Head	Uta	2:53
8.	"Happiness" (Reggae Summer Remix by Mighty Crown)	Uemura	Uemura; Uta	2:16
9.	"I'll Remember You"	Uemura; Jonas Jeberg; Anders Bagge; Sylvia Bennett-Smith; Marc Smith	Jeberg	2:07
10.	"Dear Mama"	Uemura	C3prod; Uemura	2:17
11.	"Life"	Uemura; Stephanie Fountain Stokes	Stokes	1:05
12.	"Music"	Uemura	T. Kura	2:36
13.	"Get Up" (featuring Sphere of Influence)	Uemura; Sphere of Influence	Bach Logic	2:15
14.	"365"	Uemura; Deli	Aquarius	2:26
15.	"Still..." (featuring AK-69)	Uemura; AK-69	Jin; DJ Watarai	1:36
16.	"Independent Woman"	Uemura	Elliot Washington; Uemura	2:12
17.	"Dance Together"	Uemura	TeeFlii; Uemura	2:30
18.	"Top of the World"	Quinney; Macklin, Vines; Jenkins; Foreman; White	Fifty1 Fifty	2:08
19.	"You Are My Star"	Uemura	Uta	1:23
20.	"Hanabi"	Uemura	Uta; Uemura	2:21
21.	"Sogood"	Uemura	Uta; Uemura	2:55
22.	"Wavin' Flag (Coca-Cola Celebration Mix)" (Version Ai)	Keinan Abdi Warsame; Bruno Mars; Philip Lawrence; Jean Daval	Uta	2:55
Total length:				48:54

Notes

- Track 7 of disc one and 21 of disc two are stylized in all lower case.
- Tracks 1, 3–4, 8, and 10–15 of disc one and 4, 11, 16–18, and 20 of disc two are stylized in all capitals.
- Tracks 6, 16 and 17 of disc one and 8 and 10 of disc two are titled in Japanese.

== Personnel ==
Personnel details were sourced from Moriagaro's liner notes booklet.

Performance credits

- Ai – vocals, background vocals
- Che'nelle – vocals (#9)
- Jeremih – vocals (#1)
- Bridget Kelly – vocals (#8, #15)
- Lloyd – vocals (#5)
- Swiss Chris – drums (#8)

Visuals and imagery

- Ambush – costume cooperation
- Justin Davis – costume cooperation
- Noriko Goto – stylist
- Ayako Hishinuma – prop creator ('Moriagaro Bling Bling')
- Manabu Honchu – design
- Justin & Valley – logo design
- Akio Kawabata – package coordination
- Yasunari Kikuma – photographer
- Akemi Ono – hair, make-up
- Toshiya Ono – art direction
- Shuma Saito – package coordination
- Silver Face – prop creator ('Moriagaro Knuckle Rings')
- Shigeaki Watanabe – prop creator ('Moriagaro Cap')
- Wut Berlin – costume cooperation
- X-Closet – costume cooperation
- Eiji Yoshimura – design

Technical and production

- Ai – producer (#1, #3–4, #6–7, #9–10)
- Arden 'Keys' Altino – co-producer (#8)
- Ben-E – producer (#6)
- Jo Blaq – mixing, vocal recording (#12)
- C3prod – producer (#6)
- Tom Coyne – album mastering
- D.Clax – producer (#5)
- De-Capo Music Group – producer (#1)
- DOI – mixing (#1–7, #9–11)
- Akene 'The Champ' Dunkley – co-producer (#8)
- Jerry 'Wonda' Duplessis – producer (#8)
- Fifty 1 Fifty – producer (#9–10, #12)
- Keisuke Fujimaki – vocal recording (#4)
- Seiji Itabashi – assisting (#8, #11)
- Carlos 'Los' Jenkins – vocal recording (#12)
- Neeraj Khajanchi – additional vocal recording (#8), vocal recording (#11)
- T. Kura – vocal editing (#2)
- Sean 'Pen' McMillion – engineering (#5), vocal producer for Lloyd (#5)
- Michico – vocal producer (#2)
- Yoshinori Morita – vocal recording (#1, #6–7, #9)
- Taiji Okuda – Japanese production (#5), recording (#2–3, #10)
- Mario Parra – Che'nelle's vocal recording (#9)
- Lance Powell – assisting (#8)
- Andrew Robertson – assisting (#8)
- Mark Roger – vocal recording (#1)
- Serge 'Sergical' Tsai – recording (#8)
- Uta – producer (#2–4, #7, #11)
- Satoshi Yoneda – vocal editing (#2)

== Charts ==
=== Weekly charts ===
Weekly chart performance for Motto Moriagaro
Chart (2013)	Peak position
Japanese Albums (Oricon)	5

=== Monthly charts ===
Monthly chart performance for Motto Moriagaro
Chart (2013)	Peak position
Japanese Albums (Oricon)	18

== Release history ==
Release history and formats for Motto Moriagaro
Region	Date	Format	Label
Japan	November 20, 2013	Digital download; streaming; CD	EMI Japan; Universal Japan
