= Yaffle =

Yaffle may refer to:

- Yaffle (bird), or European green woodpecker
- Yaffle (music producer), Japanese music producer; co-writer of the 2024 song "Rise Together"
- Professor Yaffle, a bird character in the British animated series Bagpuss
