= Ai discography =

Ai discography may refer to:

- Ai albums discography
- Ai singles discography
