= Still on My Road =

2026 single by Ai

Single by Ai
- Language: Japanese
- Released: September 18, 2026
- Recorded: 2026
- Length: 3:52
- Label: EMI
- Songwriters: Ai Carina Uemura; Yuki Kishida
- Producers: Ai; Yuki Kishida

Ai singles chronology
| "It's You" (2026) | "Still on My Road" (2026) | "It's Ai" (2026) |

Music video
- "Still on My Road" on YouTube

"Still on My Road" (Japanese: まだ旅の途中, Hepburn: Mada Tabi no Tochū) is a song recorded by Japanese-American singer-songwriter Ai, released on September 18, 2026, via EMI Records. Co-written and co-produced with Yuki Kishida, "Still on My Road" was created for the 93rd NHK All-Japan School Music Contest.

== Background and release ==
Between late 2024 and early 2025, Ai begun a series of activities as part of her 25th anniversary in the music industry. Universal Music Japan launched a special site, 25 of Ai, detailing the campaign. After the release of her greatest hits album 25th the Best – Alive, Ai revealed the last project of her campaign, announcing she would create a song for the 93rd NHK All-Japan School Music Contest.

In September 2026, Ai announced the release of "Still on My Road". The single was released digitally on September 18, 2026.

== Cover art ==
The cover art of "Still on My Road" features a still from NHK's Minna no Uta, animated by Saku Sakamoto.

== Music video ==
In August 2026, Ai shared on social media for castings for a music video starring high school students. On September 25, the music video for "Still on My Road" was announced. The music video was released on September 30.

== Live performances ==
Ai appeared on Count Down TV, performing "Still on My Road" and "Happiness".

== Credits and personnel ==
- Ai Carina Uemura – vocals, production
- Yuki Kishida – production, piano
- Taiji Okuda – mixing, recording engineer
- Sorachi Nishimura – recording engineer, additional engineer
- Akari Kawano – additional engineer
- Randy Merrill – mastering

== Release history ==
Release history and formats for "Still on My Road"
| Region | Date | Format | Label | Ref. |
|---|---|---|---|---|
| Various | September 18, 2026 | Digital download; streaming | EMI | |
