= Flashback to Ai =

Compilation album by Ai
- Released: September 8, 2004
- Recorded: 2000–2001
- Genre: R&B; J-pop; hip hop
- Length: 59:11
- Language: Japanese; English
- Label: RCA; BMG Fun House

Ai chronology
2004 Ai (2004)	Flashback to Ai (2004)	Feat. Ai (2004)

Flashback to Ai (stylized FLASHBACK TO A.I., alternatively titled as Flashback Remixes) is the first compilation album by Japanese-American singer-songwriter Ai. It was released on September 8, 2004, by RCA Records and BMG Fun House.

The compilation features remixes and unreleased tracks recorded in 2000 and 2001 from Ai's debut studio album, My Name Is Ai. Similar to her debut album, the album was only released physically and not on digital stores.

== Background and release ==
After the commercial failure of her debut album, Ai left BMG and signed to Universal Music Japan sublabel Def Jam Japan in 2002. Her second and third studio albums under Def Jam were successful commercially, with Original Ai peaking at number 15 on the Japan Oricon Albums chart and 2004 Ai at number 3. 2004 Ai later received a Gold certification from the Recording Industry Association of Japan (RIAJ). A few months after the release of 2004 Ai, BMG released the album without any prior announcement. The album was marketed as "The best selection of the BMG era" by the label.

== Critical reception ==
CDJournal gave the compilation a positive review, noting it contained "the best and treasured sounds of the Japanese hip hop and R&B queen" that previously were not released.

== Track listing ==
=== CD ===
1. Shining Star (V.I.P Lovers Rock Mix) – 5:28
2. 24/7 (DJ Nozom Remix) – 5:09
3. Cry, Just Cry (Soul'd Out Mix) – 4:49
4. Once Again – 4:46
5. I Wish – 6:24
6. U Can Do (Hi Pops Version) – 4:23
7. Protect You – 4:39
8. Never Love This Way – 4:56
9. Shut Out (featuring Diggy-Mosould Out) – 5:09
10. Depend On Me – 5:35
11. 24/7 – 4:26
12. Shining Star (Original Master Version) – 4:20
13. Cry, Just Cry (English Version) – 5:07

=== Vinyl ===
1. Shining Star (V.I.P Lovers Rock Mix) – 5:28
2. Shining Star (V.I.P Lovers Rock Mix Instrumental) – 5:28
3. 24/7 (DJ Nozom Remix) – 5:09
4. 24/7 (DJ Nozom Remix Instrumental) – 5:09
5. Cry, Just Cry (Soul'd Out Mix) – 4:49

== Charts ==
Flashback to Ai peaked at number 55 on the Oricon Albums Chart.

Chart performance for Flashback to Ai
Chart (2004)	Peak position
Japanese Albums (Oricon)	55

== Release history ==
Release history and formats for Flashback to Ai
Region	Date	Format(s)	Label	Ref.
Japan	September 8, 2008	CD; LP	RCA; BMG Fun House	
