= Magnetic (Kaela Kimura song) =

- The First Take cover.

Single by Kaela Kimura featuring Ai

from the album Magnetic
- Language: Japanese; English
- Released: December 14, 2022
- Genre: Moombahton
- Length: 3:04
- Label: Colourful; ELA
- Songwriter(s): Kaela Kimura; Ai Carina Uemura
- Producer(s): Mito

Kaela Kimura singles chronology
"Color Me" (2022)	"Magnetic" (2022)

Ai singles chronology
"Start Again" (2022)	"Magnetic" (2022)	"Respect All" (2023)

Music video
- "Magnetic" on YouTube

"Magnetic" is a song recorded by Japanese singer Kaela Kimura featuring Japanese-American singer-songwriter Ai. It was released on December 14, 2022, by Colourful Records and ELA, to Japanese radio, the same day Kimura's eleventh studio album of the same name was released.

Upon its release, the song failed to enter any Billboard Japan or Oricon charts, however it peaked at number 33 on J-Wave's Tokio Hot 100.

== Background ==
In June 2022, Kaela Kimura released "Color Me", featuring Mahi to the People. In November of that same year, Kimura announced her eleventh studio album, titled Magnetic. Regarding the title of the album and the song of the same name, Kimura noted that "magnetism attracts things" including "people and attractiveness". In a 2022 interview with Music Natalie, Kimura stated she came up with the idea of doing a song with Ai two years ago.

== Lyrics and composition ==
Musically, "Magnetic" is a moombahton song, combining reggaeton and house music. Its lyrics are based on attracting and detracting people, similar to magnetism.

== Release and promotion ==
Victor Entertainment serviced "Magnetic" to Japanese radio on December 14, 2022, the same day Kimura's album was released in Japan. To promote the song, Kimura announced a music video for "Magnetic" would be released in January 2023. Kimura appeared on Sony Music Japan's The First Take, performing a solo version of "Magnetic" and "Butterfly".

== Music video ==
A scene in the "Magnetic" music video showing Kimura (left) and Ai (right) linking arms, similar to how magnets of opposite poles can connect to one another.

A music video directed by Takeshi Nakamura was released on January 24, 2023, on Kimura's YouTube channel. In the video, Kimura and Ai represent two magnets, one with a north pole and the other with a south pole. Kimura, dressed in red, and Ai, dressed in blue, perform various dances with each other.

== Release history ==
Release history and formats for "Magnetic"
Region	Date	Format	Version	Label	Ref.
Japan	December 14, 2022	Radio airplay	Original	Victor Entertainment	
Various	December 14, 2022	Digital download; streaming	Original	Colourful; ELA	
Various	January 25, 2023	Digital download; streaming	First Take	Colourful; ELA	
