= After the Rain (Ai song) =

2004 single by Ai

- Standard cover art

Single by Ai

from the album 2004 Ai
- Language: Japanese; English
- B-side: "Mugen"
- Released: March 3, 2004
- Genre: R&B
- Label: Def Jam Japan
- Songwriter(s): Ai Carina Uemura; Michico; T. Kura
- Producer(s): T. Kura

Ai singles chronology
"My Friend" / "Merry Christmas Mr. Lawrence" (2003)	"After the Rain" (2004)	"E.O." (2004)

"After the Rain" is a song recorded by Japanese-American singer-songwriter Ai, released on March 3, 2004, by Def Jam Japan. Described by critics as Ai's first "love song", "After the Rain" is an R&B ballad that served as the ending theme song for Fuji Television's Hey! Hey! Hey! Music Champ. Following its release in Japan, "After the Rain" was moderately successful, peaking at number 32 on the Oricon Singles Chart.

== Background and release ==
After the release of her second studio album Original Ai (2003), Ai saw new success as an artist, being described as the hottest and most popular R&B singer of 2003 in Japan.

On March 3, 2004, Ai released "After the Rain". In a press release, Ai compared "After the Rain" with her 2003 single "Last Words", describing "After the Rain" having a more "positive message" compared to "Last Words" which was written about letting go of relationships.

Two editions of "After the Rain" were released. The standard and limited edition include "After the Rain", the B-side "Mugen" and instrumental versions of the two songs. The limited edition of the single includes a bonus DVD with the music video for "After the Rain" and a behind the scenes photo session.

== Commercial performance ==
"After the Rain" experienced moderate commercial success upon its release. Peaking at number 32 on the Oricon Singles Chart, "After the Rain" appeared on the chart for a total of seven weeks.

At the 2004 MTV Video Music Awards Japan, "After the Rain" was nominated for Best Buzz Asia – Japan, however lost to "Put 'Em Up" by Namie Amuro.

== Live performances ==
Ai performed "After the Rain" at the 2004 Space Shower Music Video Awards. She performed the song at the 2004 MTV Video Music Awards Japan.

== Track listing ==
- CD maxi single
1. "After the Rain"
2. "Mugen" (無限)
3. "After the Rain" (instrumental)
4. "Mugen" (instrumental)
- CD+DVD maxi single – limited edition
1. "After the Rain" (music video)
2. "Photo Session Making"

== Personnel ==
- Ai – lead vocals, executive producer
- Michico – background vocals
- T. Kura – production, mixing
- Akitomo Fukushima – recording assistance
- Mineo Watanabe – recording
- Tom Coyne – mastering

== Charts ==
Chart performance for "After the Rain"
Chart (2004)	Peak position
Japan (Oricon)	32

== Release history ==
Release history and formats for "After the Rain"
Region	Date	Format(s)	Version	Label	Ref.
Japan	March 3, 2004	CD	Standard	Def Jam Japan	
Japan	March 3, 2004	CD	Limited	Def Jam Japan	
