= My Wish (Ai song) =

2025 single by Ai

Single by Ai
- Language: Japanese; English
- Released: April 16, 2025
- Genre: Gospel
- Length: 5:14
- Label: EMI
- Songwriters: Ai Carina Uemura; Gakushi
- Producers: Gakushi; Ai

Ai singles chronology
"Nakama" (2025)	"My Wish" (2025)	"Lucky I Love You" (2026)

Music video
- "My Wish" on YouTube

"My Wish" (stylized in all lowercase) is a song recorded by Japanese-American singer-songwriter Ai, released on April 16, 2025, via EMI Records. A gospel ballad, "My Wish" served as the image song for the 2025 Japanese film adaptation of Hana Manma.

== Background and release ==
In February 2025, Ai revealed she wrote a song for the Japanese film adaptation of Hana Manma. A trailer was released the same day, teasing a snippet of her new song, "My Wish".

In March, Ai teased on social media of an upcoming music video for an unreleased song. A mural depicting her was painted at the BNA Wall Art Hotel in Tokyo by Ai's former high school classmate, Robert Vargas.

On April 7, an edit of the song was shared on YouTube by the production company behind Hana Manma. The short movie featured select scenes from the film.

The full version of "My Wish" was released digitally as a single on April 16.

== Promotion ==
Universal Music Japan launched a pre-ad campaign lottery for "My Wish" from April 7 until its release. A second social media promotion for "My Wish" launched the same day the song was released until April 30.

== Music video ==
A music video for "My Wish" premiered on Ai's YouTube channel the same day the song was released. Directed by Won, who directed the 2025 music video of "Story", the music video depicts Ai singing as a mural of her is painted in the background by Vargas.

== Credits and personnel ==
- Ai Carina Uemura – vocals, production
- Gakushi – production, instruments
- Shohei Ishikawa – engineering
- D.O.I. – mixing

== Release history ==
Release history and formats for "My Wish"
Region	Date	Format	Label	Ref.
Various	April 16, 2025	Digital download; streaming	EMI; Universal	
