= It's You (Ai song) =

2026 single by Ai

Single by Ai
- Language: Japanese; English
- Released: April 13, 2026
- Genre: R&B
- Length: 4:02
- Label: EMI
- Songwriters: Ai Carina Uemura; Uta
- Producers: Ai; Uta

Ai singles chronology
"Lucky I Love You" (2026)	"It's You" (2026)	"Still on My Road" (2026)

Music video
- "It's You" on YouTube

"It's You" is a song recorded by Japanese-American singer-songwriter Ai, released on April 13, 2026, via EMI Records. Described as an R&B ballad, "It's You" served as the image song for the Japanese drama series Ten Strokes to You.

== Background and release ==
Ai released her first single of 2026, "Lucky I Love You", which was used in a commercial tie-in by Nestlé Japan. In March 2026, Ai hinted to Billboard that she was working on her fourteenth studio album. Later that month, she shared in a press release that her new song "It's You" was chosen as the image song for the Japanese drama series Ten Strokes to You.

On April 13, "It's You" was released as a digital single following the premiere of Ten Strokes to You. A Korean version of "It's You" was released on June 7, 2026, serving as her first Korean-language song.

== Music and lyrics ==
"It's You" is 4 minutes and 2 seconds long. Music journalists noted it as an R&B ballad. Barks described "It's You" as a "superb R&B ballad" that showcases Ai's "powerful yet poignant vocals". In a press release, Ai described the lyrics for "It's You" as "a little melancholic".

== Promotion ==
Universal Music Japan launched the #Yoursmile challenge in promotion of the release.

== Credits and personnel ==
Original

- Ai Carina Uemura – vocals, production
- Uta – production, instruments
- D.O.I – mixing, immersive mixing

Korean

- Ai Carina Uemura – vocals, production
- Uta – production, instruments
- D.O.I – mixing, immersive mixing
- Jin – vocal production, translation

== Release history ==
Release history and formats for "It's You"
Region	Date	Format(s)	Version	Label	Ref.
Various	April 13, 2026	Digital download; streaming	Original	EMI	
Various	June 7, 2026	Digital download; streaming	Korean	EMI	
