= Whatever (Ai song) =

2023 promotional single by Ai

Promotional single by Ai
- Language: Japanese; English
- Released: December 20, 2023
- Length: 3:14
- Label: EMI
- Songwriter(s): Ai Carina Uemura; Uta
- Producer(s): Uta; Ai

Music video
- "Whatever" on YouTube

"Whatever" (ワレバ, Wureba) is a song recorded by Japanese-American singer-songwriter Ai, released on December 20, 2023, by EMI Records. Commissioned by Nestlé Japan, "Whatever" is the fourth song Ai recorded for the company to use in various promotional campaigns following a trend in Japan of writing messages on the wrappings of Kit Kats.

== Background ==
In early 2022, Ai released a promotional single, "First Time", from her twelfth studio album, Dream. To promote the song, Nestlé Japan featured an excerpt of the song in an animated television commercial advertising Kit Kats. Near the end of 2022, Ai released "Start Again" for Nestlé Japan to use in televised commercials. She also recorded a cover of Queen's "We Are the Champions" which was featured in Nestlé Japan's Kit Kat Best Ever television commercial.

== Promotion and release ==
Ai began teasing "Whatever" on social media days prior to its release. In an artist lineup for Music Station Super Live 2023, media outlets reported Ai would be performing "Whatever". On December 20, the song was released on digital stores as a promotional single. Nestlé Japan featured "Whatever" in a commercial depicting students preparing and taking their exams.

== Music video ==
A music video for "Whatever" was released on March 15, 2024 on Ai's YouTube channel. Various artists and Japanese celebrities appear in the music video, including Awich, Mr. Maric, Deli, and Shinji Ono.

== Live performances ==
Ai performed "Whatever" for the first time on the day of its release at the Yushima Tenmangū shrine for Nestlé Japan's Kit Kat Student Support Campaign. On December 22, 2023, Ai performed "Whatever" on the Music Station year end program, Super Live.

== Credits and personnel ==
Credits adapted from Tidal.

- Ai Carina Uemura – vocals, production
- Uta – production, arrangement

== Release history ==
Release history and formats for "Whatever"
Region	Date	Format	Label	Ref.
Various	December 20, 2023	Digital download; streaming	EMI	
