= 2004 Ai =

Studio album by Ai
- Released: June 16, 2004
- Recorded: 2004
- Studios: Prime Sound Studio Form (Meguro, Tokyo); Studio Fine (Higashi-Azabu, Tokyo); Universoul (Shibuya, Tokyo); HiBrite Studio (Tokyo); On Air Azabu (Minato, Tokyo); Magnet Studio (Tokyo); Sony Music Studios (Minato, Tokyo)
- Genres: R&B; hip hop
- Length: 54:38
- Language: Japanese
- Labels: Def Jam Japan; Universal Sigma
- Producers: 2Soul; T. Kura; 813; Daisuke Imai; Shirō Sagisu; Michico; Great Dane

Ai chronology
Original Ai (2003)	2004 Ai (2004)	Flashback to Ai (2004)

Singles from 2004 Ai
- 1. "After the Rain" Released: March 3, 2004; 2. "E.O." Released: May 12, 2004; 3. "Watch Out!" Released: August 4, 2004

2004 Ai (stylized as 2004 A.I.) is the third studio album by Japanese-American singer-songwriter Ai, released on June 16, 2004, by Def Jam Japan and Universal Sigma. 2004 Ai was Ai's first top 10 album, as well as her first album to be certified by the Recording Industry Association of Japan.

== Background ==
Ai previously released her second studio album, Original Ai in 2003. The album was a commercial success compared to her debut under RCA, My Name Is Ai, selling 20 times her debut album's amount and peaking at number 15 on Oricon's albums chart.

Two singles were released prior to the album, "After the Rain" and "E.O.," both of which were top 30 hits. "E.O." was her highest-charting single to date, reaching number 23.

== Writing and production ==
"After the Rain"
Billed as Ai's first "love song," "After the Rain" was the first single from the album.

"EO"
The upbeat R&B track "EO" was the highest ranking single from the album, reaching number 23.

Most of the album was produced by R&B producers 813 (DJ Yutaka and Shingo. S), 2Soul, Daisuke Imai, T. Kura and Michico. Ai had worked with 813 and Michico on Original Ai, on the songs "Summer Time" and "Girls' Talk" respectively. "Dreaming of You" was a collaboration with Danish music production duo Great Dane, i.e. Carsten Lindberg and Joachim Svare, with new Japanese lyrics written by Ai. Ai had previously worked with the pair on her single "Thank U."

Ai collaborated with several musicians on the album, most notably beat-boxer Afra and rapper Tucker on the single "Watch Out!" She also collaborated with 1970s guitarist Char, who arranged the song "Breathe." The collaboration occurred because Ai happened to be childhood friends with Char's son, vocalist Jesse from the rock band Rize. The pair later collaborated vocally on Char's DVD single "No Generation Gap" (2004), which was featured on Ai's album Feat. Ai. Ai also collaborated with reggae artist Boy-Ken on "Angel." Boy-Ken released an alternative version of "Angel" on his album Everythin' Is Everythin' (2004). The interlude "L'Haleine des Cordes" is a classical piece arranged by game music composer Shirō Sagisu.

== Promotion and concerts ==
The album received several minor commercial tie-ups. "After the Rain" was used as the Fuji TV music show Hey! Hey! Hey! Music Champ's January to April 2004 ending theme song. "E.O." was use as the TV Tokyo music show Japan Countdown's May 2004 ending theme song. "Watch Out!" was used in TV commercials for the PlayStation game True Crime: Streets of LA.

An English version of the song "Alive" was used as an insert song for the South Korean drama Sassy Girl Chun-hyang.

Ai supported the album with two tours, the 15 date 2004 Ai Club Tour between May and August 2004, and the 10 date 2004 Ai Japan Tour in September and October 2004. Ai also performed at the 2004 MTV Buzz Asia Concert in Seoul, South Korea, as well as the Taipei Music Festival to promote the album. Footage from the Taiwan concert, the club tour and the concert tour were compiled to create Ai's first live DVD, Machigainai.

== Critical reception ==
The reviewers at CDJournal felt the album had a lot more personality than Original Ai. (2003) They felt the album's sound did not show the "frailty" of other popular R&B acts, and noted the album's "strong beats" and the lyrics from a female viewpoint. "After the Rain" was called "bewitching," and that the song's "sticky with emotion melody wraps the song in a mellow atmosphere." The reviewers felt that Ai's "pressingly questioning" rap in "Watch Out!" showed a high level of technique.

The music videos were well received at music awards shows. At the 2004 MTV Video Music Awards Japan, "After the Rain" was nominated for the Best Buzz Asia – Japan award. Ai also received two nominations at the 2005 MTV Video Music Awards Japan, best R&B video for "E.O.," and best collaboration for "Watch Out." In 2005 at the Space Shower Music Video Awards, she won the best female video award for "Watch Out."

== Chart performance ==
The album debuted at number three in Japan, selling 36,000 copies. It became a long charting album, selling three times its first week total (113,000) over 17 weeks. At the time, this was Ai's most successful release, and it became her first release to receive a certification by the RIAJ (gold). As of 2012, it remains her fourth most commercially successful album in Japan.

== Track listing ==
No.	Title	Lyrics	Music	Length
1.	"Intro"		2Soul	1:01
2.	"E.O."	Ai	2Soul	4:00
3.	"After the Rain"	Ai	T. Kura, Michico, Ai	5:01
4.	"100%" (Hyaku Pāsento)	Ai	T. Kura, Michico, Ai	3:36
5.	"L'Haleine des Cordes (Interlude)" ([Fr]: "The Breath of the Strings")		Shirō Sagisu	0:54
6.	"Breathe"	Ai	Char	4:41
7.	"Mugen" (無限 "Infinite")	Ai, Daisuke Imai	Ai, D. Imai	4:09
8.	"Say Yes, Say No"	Ai	2Soul	4:21
9.	"Alive"	Ai, Shoko Fujibayashi	2Soul	4:37
10.	"Angel" (featuring Boy-Ken), (エンジェル Enjeru)	Ai, Boy-Ken	Ai, 813	4:28
11.	"I'm Sorry"	Ai, D. Imai	Ai, D. Imai	4:21
12.	"Watch Out!" (featuring Afra, Tucker)	Ai	Ai, Afra, Tucker	3:58
13.	"Ongaku Kiite" (オンガクキイテ "Listen to the Music")		813	0:59
14.	"Listen 2 da Music"	Ai	Ai, 813	3:47
15.	"Dreaming of You"	Ai	C. Lindberg, J. Svare	4:33
Total length:				54:38

Overseas release bonus tracks
No.	Title	Lyrics	Music	Length
16.	"Killing Me Softly with His Song"	Norman Gimbel	Charles Fox	4:40
17.	"Silly of Me"	Channette Higgens, Channoah Higgens	C. Lindberg, J. Svare	4:34
Total length:				64:52

== Personnel ==
Personnel details were sourced from 2004 Ai's liner notes booklet.

Managerial

- Ai – executive producer
- Yuki Arai – co-executive producer
- Kay Ichikawa – publisher
- Aiichiro Kiyohara – A&R director
- Kaz Koike – co-executive producer
- Toshiharu Kojima – co-executive producer
- Shinki Miura – co-executive producer
- Atsushi Nakaue – publisher
- Kenya "Malu.k" Orita – executive producer (#15, #17)
- Koichi Sakakibara – artist management
- Tamotsu Suzuki – recording coordinator (#6, #16)
- Akira Terabayashi – co-executive producer
- Kumi Kawasumi Yoshida – publisher

Performance credits

- 2Soul – instruments (#2, #9)
- Afra – human beatbox, vocals (#12)
- Ai – vocals, background vocals
- Aaron Blackmon – bass (#4)
- Boy-Ken – vocals (#10)
- Dave Burnett – bass (#2, #8)
- Char – acoustic guitar (#6)
- Kim Hanson – additional keyboard, string arrangement(#15, #17)
- Daisuke Imai – instruments (#7, #11)
- T. Kura – instruments (#3–#4)
- Carsten Lindsberg – instruments (#15, #17)
- Michico – background vocals (#3)
- Wilson Montuori – guitars (#2, #8)
- Royal Mirrorball Orchestra – strings (#5–#6)
- Royal Mirrorball Sextet – strings (#16)
- Shirō Sagisu – keyboards (#6, #16)
- James Spears – keyboard (#8)
- Joachim Svare – instruments (#15, #17)
- Tucker – bass, electone, guitar, keyboard, vocals (#12)

Visuals and imagery

- Eito Furukubo – hair, make-up
- Noriko Goto – stylist
- Misato Kumamoto – art direction, design
- Cassio Macambira – photographer

Technical and production

- 2Soul – arrangement, production (#1–#2, #8–#9)
- 813 – arrangement, production (#10, #13–#14)
- Afra – production (#12)
- Ai – production (#12)
- Junya Endo – mixing (#11)
- Akitomo Fukushima – recording assistance (#3–#4)
- Bruce Gowdy – mixing assistant (#10, #14)
- Daisuke Imai – arrangement, instrument recording, production (#7, #11)
- Masahiro Kawagucchi – mixing (#12), mixing engineer (#6, #16), Pro Tools digital editing (#6, #16), recording engineer (#6, #16)
- T. Kura – arrangement, mixing, production (#3–#4)
- Yukihiro Kusuru – co-engineering, co-mixing (#7)
- Carsten Lindsberg – arrangement, mixing, producer (#15, #17)
- Yasuji "Yasman" Maeda – mastering, mastering engineer (#16)
- Minako Nozue – assistant engineer (#6, #16)
- Tetsuya Ochiai – concert master (#6, #16)
- Taiji Okuda – vocal recording (#10–#12)
- Kenya "Malu.k" Orita – vocal recording (#15, #17)
- Shirō Sagisu – arrangement (#5–#6, #16), drum programming (#6, #16)
- Tatsuya Sato – editing (#2, #8–#9), engineering (#2, #8–#9), mixing (#2, #8–#9), vocal recording (#2, #9)
- Mitsuru "Boo" Shibamoto – assistant engineer (#2, #9), engineering (#15, #17), vocal recording (#8, #14)
- Troy Stanton – mixing (#10, #14)
- Joachim Svare – arrangement, mixing, producer (#15, #17)
- Tomotaka Takehara – engineering, mixing (#7)
- Tucker – production (#12)
- Mineo Watanabe – recording (#3)
- Haruo Yoda – production (#6, #16)

== Charts and sales ==
Chart performance for 2004 Ai
Chart (2004)	Peak position
Japan Oricon weekly albums	3

=== Sales and certifications ===
Chart	Amount
Oricon physical sales	113,000
RIAJ physical shipping certification	Gold (100,000+)

== Release history ==
Release history and formats for 2004 Ai
Region	Date	Format(s)	Label	Ref.
Japan	June 16, 2004	CD; digital download; streaming	Def Jam Japan; Universal Sigma	
Taiwan	July 3, 2004	CD; digital download; streaming	Universal Taiwan	
South Korea	July 21, 2004	CD; digital download; streaming	Universal Korea	
Various	December 5, 2012	CD; digital download; streaming	USM Japan	
