= OZworld =

Japanese rapper (born 1997)

Okuma Reo 奥間玲央
- Also known as: OZworld, R'kuma (former)
- Genres: Rap, Japanese hip-hop
- Occupation: Rapper
- Years active: 2015-present
- Label: MS Entertainment

Okuma Reo (born November 17, 1997), better known by his stage name OZworld, formerly known as R'kuma, is a Japanese rapper from Kadena, Okinawa Prefecture. He raps in both the Okinawan (Ryūkyūan) & Japanese languages.

== Early life ==
Born to parents who divorced shortly after his birth, he was raised by his mother. His first music purchase was Def Tech's CD.

Inspired by local artists, he developed an interest in street culture and began rapping during his first year of high school. He made his live debut performing at Okinawa City's "L-LINE" club during summer vacation. His 2015 collaboration with Rude-α, "CoCo ga OKINAWA" (recorded during his second year of high school), gained significant local attention.

In 2016, OZworld (then known as R'kuma) competed in the 9th BAZOOKA!!! High School Rap Championship, despite having dropped out of high school that February—a decision he attributed to "various reasons." At the time, he admitted, "Honestly, I wasn’t in the mood to rap," yet the event became a pivotal moment in his career.

Later that year, he returned for the 10th High School Rap Championship (held August 30), which featured an all-star lineup: five past champions and eleven contestants chosen by audience votes. His back-to-back participation marked a period of artistic redefinition.

== Career ==
On June 9, 2019, OZworld released their first album, OZWORLD.

The second album, OZKNEEZ FXXKED UP, arrived on November 17, 2020 (the artist's birthday). Dubbed the "zero album," this release represented a creative reset. OZworld described the production process as returning to his raw, foundational rap style, even preceding the approach of his debut.

On April 17, 2024, OZworld featured on "RISE TOGETHER" (stylized in all caps), a hip-hop/gospel fusion track by Japanese-American artist Ai and producer Yaffle. Released through EMI Records, the song served as the official image track for the Japanese release of Godzilla x Kong: The New Empire (2024), marking OZworld's first major international film tie-in.

== Name change ==
By early 2018, R'kuma felt constrained by his name’s association with battle rap. Upon releasing "Tatami" (February 2018), he adopted "OZworld"—a name that came to him spontaneously. This shift coincided with a deeper exploration of spirituality, influenced in part by his interactions with collaborator Yutah.

== Discography ==
Albums

- OZWORLD (June, 2019)
- OZKNEEZ FXXKED UP (November, 2020)
- SUN NO KUNI (September, 2023)
- おくまれお (September, 2026)
