= Respect All (song) =

Single by Ai

from the album Respect All
- Language: Japanese; English
- Released: May 22, 2023
- Length: 2:58
- Label: EMI
- Songwriters: Ai Carina Uemura; Bob James; Tomoko Ida
- Producer: Tomoko Ida

Ai singles chronology
"Magnetic" (2022)	"Respect All" (2023)	"Bad Bitch Bigaku" (remix) (2023)

Music video
- "Respect All" on YouTube

"Respect All" is a song recorded by Japanese-American singer-songwriter Ai, released on May 22, 2023, by EMI Records. Titled after Ai's twelfth headlining concert tour, the Respect All Tour, the song samples Bob James' 1982 instrumental song, "Shamboozie".

== Background ==
A few months after the end of the Dream Tour, Ai announced in May 2023 that she would be embarking on another concert tour, titled the Respect All Tour. With 30 performances in Japan, the tour expects to have 80,000 people attend with the easing of COVID-19 prevention rules in Japan. Ai's first single of 2023 was announced, titled after the tour. Ai revealed the song samples Bob James' "Shamboozie" to "liven up the 50th anniversary of the birth of hip hop". Within that same month, Ai performed live in Hiroshima during the 49th G7 summit and announced a global tour to take place in the future.

== Music video ==
A music video was announced the same day "Respect All" was released. It premiered on Ai's YouTube channel hours later. Children who are in the Super Kids Dancers group appeared in the music video, as well as dancers Mona, Mee and Yan with choreography by Reina. Near the end of the music video, a teaser hinted Ai would release her thirteenth studio album later in the year.

== Credits and personnel ==
Credits adapted from Tidal.

- Ai Carina Uemura – vocals, songwriter
- Bob James – songwriter
- Tomoko Ida – songwriter, producer, recording arrangement
- Heiwa – additional vocals
- Yuki Kishida – keyboard
- DJ Hirakatsu – turntable

== Release history ==
Release history and formats for "Respect All"
Region	Date	Format	Label	Ref.
Various	May 22, 2023	Digital download; streaming	EMI	
