= E.O. (song) =

2004 single by Ai

- Standard edition cover

Single by Ai

from the album 2004 Ai
- B-side: "Alive"
- Released: May 12, 2004
- Studio: Prime Sound Studio Form (Tokyo)
- Length: 4:00
- Label: Def Jam Japan
- Songwriters: Ai Carina Uemura; 2 Soul
- Producer: 2 Soul

Ai singles chronology
"After the Rain" (2004)	"E.O." (2004)	"No Generation Gap" (2004)

Music video
- "E.O." on YouTube

"E.O." is a song recorded by Japanese-American singer-songwriter Ai, released on May 12, 2004, by Def Jam Japan. The song was her best performing single released in 2004, subsequently serving as the second single from her third studio album, 2004 Ai.

== Background and release ==
In March 2004, Ai released "After the Rain", an R&B ballad critics described as her first "love song". The song served as the ending theme song for Fuji Television's Hey! Hey! Hey! Music Champ from January to March 2004.

On May 12, Ai released "E.O." in two editions: standard and limited edition. The standard and limited edition include a B-side track, "Alive". An English version of "Alive" was used as an insert song for the South Korean television series Sassy Girl Chun-hyang. Both editions additionally include a remix of "E.O." by 2 Soul. The limited edition of "E.O." includes a bonus DVD containing the official music video.

Shortly after the release of "E.O.", Ai announced her third studio album, 2004 Ai.

At the 2005 MTV Video Music Awards Japan, "E.O." was nominated for "Best R&B Video", however it lost to Namie Amuro's "Girl Talk".

== Track listing ==
- CD maxi single
1. "E.O."
2. "Alive"
3. "E.O." (2 Soul remix)
4. "E.O." (instrumental)
5. "Alive" (instrumental)
- CD+DVD maxi single – limited edition
1. "E.O." (music video)

== Personnel ==
- Ai – lead vocals, executive producer
- 2 Soul – production, instruments
- Dave Burnett – bass
- Wilson Montuori – guitar
- Tatsuya Sato – mixing, engineering
- Mitsuru "Boo" Shibamoto – assistant engineering
- Tom Coyne – mastering

== Charts ==
Chart performance for "E.O."
Chart (2004)	Peak position
Japan (Oricon)	23

== Release history ==
Release history and formats for "E.O."
Region	Date	Format(s)	Version	Label	Ref.
Japan	May 12, 2004	CD	Standard	Def Jam Japan	
Japan	May 12, 2004	CD	Limited	Def Jam Japan	
