= Afra (beatboxer) =

Japanese beatboxer

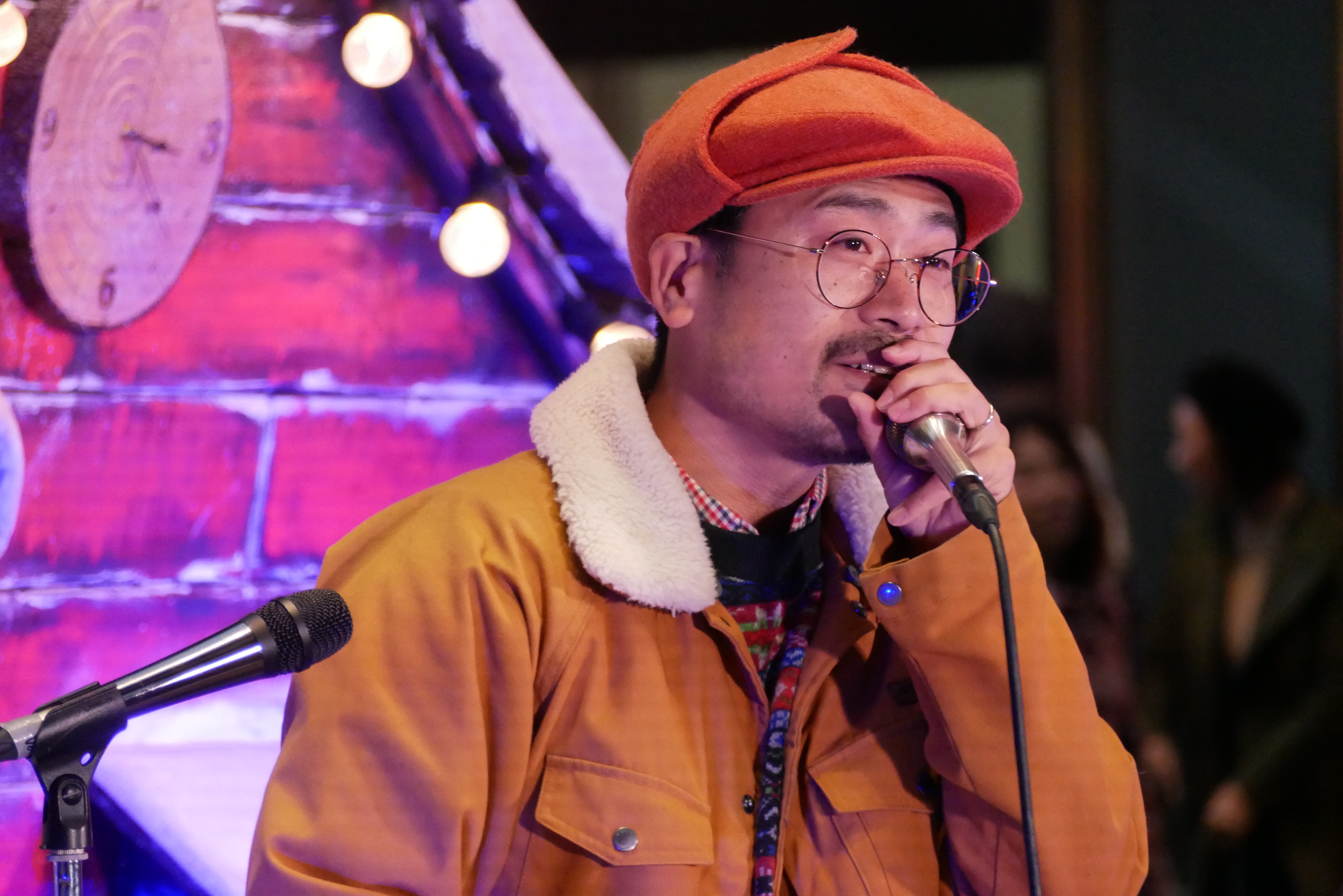
- Afra on stage, 2018

Background information
- Born: Akira Fujioka; 29 January 1980 (age 46); Suita, Osaka, Japan
- Occupation: Beatboxer
- Years active: 2000s–present
- Member of: Afra & Incredible Beatbox Band

Akira Fujioka (藤岡 章, Fujioka Akira; born 29 January 1980), better known by his stage name Afra, is a Japanese beatboxer from Suita, Osaka. His 2004 album, Digital Breath, peaked at number 43 on the Oricon Albums Chart. He formed the beatboxing band Afra & Incredible Beatbox Band in 2005 with Kei and K-Moon.

== Discography ==
=== Studio albums ===
- Always Fresh Rhythm Attack (2003)
- Digital Breath (2004)
- I.B.B. (as Afra & Incredible Beatbox Band; 2006)
- World Class (as Afra & Incredible Beatbox Band; 2008)
- Heart Beat (2009)

=== Singles ===
- "Spring Bounce" (as Afra & Incredible Beatbox Band; 2008)

== Filmography ==
=== Television ===
- Samurai Champloo (2004)
- Devilman Crybaby (2018)
