= Rise Together =

2024 single by Ai and Yaffle featuring OZworld

Single by Ai and Yaffle featuring OZworld
- Language: Japanese; English
- Released: April 17, 2024
- Genre: Hip hop; gospel
- Label: EMI
- Songwriters: Ai Carina Uemura; Akira Ifukube; Yaffle; OZworld
- Producer: Yaffle

Ai singles chronology
"Life Goes On" (2023)	"Rise Together" (2024)	"Tide" (2024)

Yaffle singles chronology
"Night Dancer (Remix)" (2023)	"Rise Together" (2024)

OZworld singles chronology
"Meta Eden" (2023)	"Rise Together" (2024)

Music video
- "Rise Together" on YouTube

"Rise Together" (stylized in caps) is a song recorded by Japanese-American singer-songwriter Ai and Japanese producer Yaffle featuring Japanese rapper OZworld. It was released on April 17, 2024, through EMI Records. Primarily a hip hop recording with gospel influences, "Rise Together" served as the image song for the Japanese release of the 2024 American monster film Godzilla x Kong: The New Empire.

== Background ==
On April 10, 2024, Ai began to tease new music on her social media accounts. Singing a cappella, she shared a video online of her within a miniature constructed city. Two days later on April 12, Toho released a trailer for the Japanese dub version of Godzilla x Kong: The New Empire. On social media, Ai announced she recorded an image song for the film. Yaffle, who produced Ai's 2023 promotional single "World Dance", commented he "called on Ai, who has a strong ability to grab listener's ears". In regards to the lyrics and song title, Ai stated she was inspired by the film's original trailer, sublimating the trailer's catchphrase "Rise together or fall alone". Ai additionally stated her and Yaffle's musical styles "matched really well" in production of the song. Oricon reported "Rise Together" samples the musical theme of Akira Ifukube's "Godzilla (Main Theme)" alongside Ai's "gospel-like roar".

== Personnel ==
Credits adapted from Tidal.

Musicians

- Ai Carina Uemura – vocals, songwriter
- Yaffle – production, songwriter
- OZworld – vocals, songwriter
- Akira Ifukube – songwriter
- Takezo Yamada – trumpet

Technical

- Tsubasa Yamazaki – mastering
- Masahito Komori – mixing, immersive mixing
- Antoni "Foux" Kochanowski – vocal engineer
- Taisei Shiiba – assistant recording engineer
- Yohei Kunii – vocal engineer

== Release history ==
Release history and formats for "Rise Together"
Region	Date	Format	Label	Ref.
Various	April 17, 2024	Digital download; streaming	EMI; Universal	
