= Believe (Ai song) =

2006 single by Ai

Single by Ai

from the album What's Goin' On Ai
- Language: Japanese
- B-side: "No Way" "Too Much" "Beautiful"
- Released: April 19, 2006
- Genre: R&B
- Length: 4:32 (single version)
- Label: Island; Universal Sigma
- Songwriter(s): Ai Carina Uemura; DJ Yutaka; Jin
- Producer(s): DJ Yutaka

Ai singles chronology
"Story" (2005)	"Believe" (2006)	"I Wanna Know" (2006)

Music video
- "Believe" on YouTube

"Believe" is a song recorded by Japanese-American singer-songwriter Ai, released on April 19, 2006, by Island Records and Universal Sigma. Serving as the lead single for Ai's fifth studio album What's Goin' On Ai, "Believe" was featured in the Japanese live action drama Team Medical Dragon as its image song. Upon its release, "Believe" debuted and peaked at number two on the Oricon Singles chart. At the 2007 MTV Video Music Awards Japan, "Believe" won the Best R&B Video award.

== Background ==
After the release of "Story", a ballad song which later went on to become a sleeper hit in Japan, Ai released her fourth studio album Mic-a-holic Ai, which charted within the top five of the Oricon Albums chart. In early April of 2006, Ai shared to the Japanese press she wrote and recorded a song for the live action drama of Team Medical Dragon.

== Composition and lyrics ==
"Believe" is a R&B ballad in a similar vein to "Story". Produced by DJ Yutaka, Ai based the lyrics for "Believe" on treasuring other people. Barks described Ai's vocals as "soulful" and the arrangement of the song "resonates".

== Accolades ==
Year	Organization	Award/work	Result	Ref.
2007	MTV Video Music Awards Japan	Best R&B Video	Won	

== Track listing ==
- Digital download, streaming and CD
1. "Believe" – 4:32
2. "No Way" – 3:35
3. "Too Much" (featuring Rain) – 3:00
4. "Beautiful" (featuring Trey Songz) – 3:20
5. "Believe" (instrumental) – 4:32

== Credits and personnel ==
- Ai Carina Uemura – writer, vocals
- DJ Yutaka – producer, writer
- Jin – writer
- Kaori Sawada – keyboard arrangement
- C-murder – pre-production recording
- Tom Coyne – mastering

== Charts ==
=== Weekly charts ===
Weekly chart performance for "Believe"
Chart (2006)	Peak position
Japan (Oricon)	2

=== Year-end charts ===
Year-end chart performance for "Believe"
Chart (2006)	Position
Japan (Oricon)	88

== Certifications ==
Certifications and sales for "Believe"
Region	Certification	Certified units/sales
Japan (RIAJ) Physical	Gold	100,000^{^}
Japan (RIAJ) Ringtone	Million	1,000,000^{*}
Japan (RIAJ) PC download	Gold	100,000^{*}
^{*} Sales figures based on certification alone.^{^} Shipments figures based on certification alone.

== Release history ==
Release history and formats for "Believe"
Region	Date	Format(s)	Label	Ref.
Japan	April 19, 2006	Digital download; streaming; CD	Island; Universal Sigma	
