= Life Goes On (Ai song) =

Single by Ai

from the album Respect All
- Language: Japanese; English
- Released: August 3, 2023
- Length: 5:31
- Label: EMI
- Songwriter(s): Ai Carina Uemura; Tomoko Ida
- Producer(s): Tomoko Ida

Ai singles chronology
"Bad Bitch Bigaku" (remix) (2023)	"Life Goes On" (2023)	"Rise Together" (2024)

Music video
- "Life Goes On" on YouTube

"Life Goes On" is a song recorded by Japanese-American singer-songwriter Ai, released on August 3, 2023, by EMI Records. Produced by Tomoko Ida, the song serves as the image song for the Japanese film Haru ni Chiru.

== Background and release ==
Near the end of May 2023, Ai announced a new song "Life Goes On", which would serve as the image song for Japanese film Haru ni Chiru. In July, Ai announced her thirteenth studio album, Respect All. Five of ten songs were originally announced, including "Life Goes On".

On August 3, "Life Goes On" was released digitally with no prior announcement alongside digital pre-add for Respect All. A music video was later announced that day.

== Music video ==
A music video for "Life Goes On" premiered on Ai's YouTube channel on August 3. Ryusei Yokohama and Kōichi Satō, who star in Haru no Chiru, also star in the video. Regarding not appearing in the music video, Ai stated, "I want[ed] this video to be a series of cool videos."

== Live performances ==
Ai performed "Life Goes On" TBS Television's music program Music Day 2023. Ai later performed the song during a Count Down TV special and on TV Asahi's Music Station.

== Credits and personnel ==
Credits adapted from Tidal.

- Ai Carina Uemura – vocals
- Tomoko Ida – production
- Yuki Kishida – piano

== Release history ==
Release history and formats for "Life Goes On"
Region	Date	Format	Label	Ref.
Various	August 3, 2023	Digital download; streaming	EMI; Universal	
