= Moriagaro =

2013 studio album by Ai

Studio album by Ai
- Released: July 17, 2013
- Recorded: 2012–2013
- Studio: Studio MSR (Tokyo); Studioforesta (Tokyo); The Studio (West Hollywood); Wink2 Studio (Tokyo); Da Co-op Studios (Atlanta); Platinum Sound Recording Studio (New York City); Area 51 (NYC)
- Genre: Dance-pop; R&B; hip hop
- Length: 46:26
- Language: Japanese; English
- Label: EMI Japan
- Producer: De-Capo; Uta; Michico; D.Clax; C3prod; Jerry Duplessis; Fifty1 Fifty; Ai Uemura

Ai chronology
Independent (2012)	Moriagaro (2013)	Motto Moriagaro (2013)

Singles from Moriagaro
- 1. "Voice" Released: February 13, 2013; 2. "Dear Mama" Released: April 12, 2013

Moriagaro (stylized as MORIAGARO) (Japanese pronunciation: [moɾiaɡaɾoː], "Let's Get Down") is the tenth studio album by Japanese-American singer-songwriter Ai, released on July 17, 2013, by EMI Records Japan. Musically, Moriagaro expands on the dance-pop sound found on Ai's previous studio album, Independent (2012), with R&B and hip hop sensibilities. Alongside long-time collaborator Uta, Ai worked with various American producers. On November 20, 2013, the album was reissued as Motto Moriagaro.

== Writing and production ==
The album was written by Ai, collaborating with American and Japanese producers. Ai collaborated with four singers: American R&B singers Jeremih, Lloyd and Bridget Kelly, as well as Malaysian Australian R&B singer Che'Nelle, who has based her career in Japan since 2011. Five of the songs are sung in Japanese, and three entirely in English. "Moriagaro," "Don't Turn Me Off" and "Gotta Get Mine" are sung in a mix of English and Japanese.

Album recording took place mostly in Tokyo, as well as in West Hollywood, Atlanta and New York City.

Ai worked mostly with Japanese producer Uta (who she has worked with since Viva Ai (2009)) on the songs "Hanabi," "My Place," "Sogood" and "Voice." This is the first time that Ai only worked with a single Japanese producer on an album. Ai worked with five American producers on the remaining songs. Fifty 1 Fifty produced three songs, "For You," "Top of the World" and "After the Storm." De-Capo Music Group worked on "Moriagaro," C3prod on "Dear Mama" and Wonda Music on "Gotta Get Mine." Ai worked together with producer D.Clax and The Exclusives on the song "My Baby."

== Promotion and release ==
The first single released from the album was "Voice" in February 2013. The song was used as the theme song for the drama Yakō Kanransha, starring Kyōka Suzuki and Yuriko Ishida. The single became a big hit, being certified by the RIAJ as a gold single a month after release. It is currently her fourth most sold physical single since her debut. It is also her last release under the then-independent EMI Music Japan.

Ai followed up the single with two digital singles. The first was "Mama e," used in a Lotte chocolate commercial campaign for Mother's Day, and "After the Storm," used as the theme for the Japanese release of the Hong Kong martial arts film The Grandmaster. Three other songs were used for TV commercials. "Sogood" was used for KFC Japan commercials, "For You" for Kubota commercials, and "My Place" for Japan Rail in promotion of the Kyushu Shinkansen. "Gotta Get Mine" was also used as the July opening theme for the TV Tokyo R&B/dance program Chōryūha. "Top of the World" was later used as the opening theme for the TBS drama Higanjima in October 2013.

Music videos were produced for the album songs "Gotta Get Mine," "Hanabi," "My Place," and "Sogood."

== Tours ==
Ai's Moriagaro Tour began in October in Kanagawa, Japan, and included 33 dates. The final concert was held on December 18, 2013, at the Nippon Budokan in Tokyo.

== Track listing ==
Credits adapted from the liner notes of Moriagaro and Tidal.

Moriagaro track listing
No.	Title	Writer(s)	Producer(s)	Length
1.	"Moriagaro" (featuring Jeremih)	Ai Uemura; Jeremy Phillip Felton	Uemura; De-Capo	3:22
2.	"Don't Turn Me Off"	Michico; Scoopbop	Michico; Uta	3:46
3.	"Voice"	Uemura	Uta; Uemura	5:13
4.	"Hanabi"	Uemura	Uta; Uemura	4:01
5.	"My Baby" (featuring Lloyd)	Victoria Mwangi; Asia Bryant; Lloyd Polite Jr.; Sean "Pen" McMillion; Ralph "Vintage" Jeanty	D.Clax	3:36
6.	"Dear Mama" (ママへ "Mama e")	Uemura	C3prod; Uemura	4:00
7.	"Sogood"	Uemura	Uta; Uemura	3:18
8.	"Gotta Get Mine" (featuring Bridget Kelly)	Uemura; Bianca Atterberry; Akene Dunkley; Arden Altino; Jerry Duplessis	Duplessis	3:29
9.	"After the Storm" (featuring Che'Nelle)	Matthew "Damario" Quinney; Joseph Macklin; Carlos "Los" Jenkins, David "Davix" Foreman; Dashawn "Happie" White; Thomas "Tom Jack" Jackson	Fifty1 Fifty	3:40
10.	"For You" (Piano Version)	Uemura	Fifty1 Fifty	4:28
11.	"My Place"	Uemura	Uta; Uemura	4:00
12.	"Top of the World"	Quinney; Macklin; Derrick Curtis Vines; Jenkins; Foreman; White	Fifty1 Fifty	3:33
Total length:				46:26

Notes

- Tracks 1, 3–4, 8, and 10–12 are stylized in all capitals.
- Track 6 is titled in Japanese
- Track 7 is stylized in all lower case.

== Personnel ==
Personnel details were sourced from Moriagaro's liner notes booklet.

Performance credits

- Ai – vocals, background vocals
- Che'nelle – vocals (#9)
- Jeremih – vocals (#1)
- Bridget Kelly – vocals (#8)
- Lloyd – vocals (#5)
- Swiss Chris – drums (#8)

Visuals and imagery

- Ambush – costume cooperation
- Justin Davis – costume cooperation
- Noriko Goto – stylist
- Ayako Hishinuma – prop creator ('Moriagaro Bling Bling')
- Manabu Honchu – design
- Justin & Valley – logo design
- Akio Kawabata – package coordination
- Yasunari Kikuma – photographer
- Akemi Ono – hair, make-up
- Toshiya Ono – art direction
- Shuma Saito – package coordination
- Silver Face – prop creator ('Moriagaro Knuckle Rings')
- Shigeaki Watanabe – prop creator ('Moriagaro Cap')
- Wut Berlin – costume cooperation
- X-Closet – costume cooperation
- Eiji Yoshimura – design

Technical and production

- Ai – producer (#1, #3–4, #6–7, #9–10)
- Arden 'Keys' Altino – co-producer (#8)
- Ben-E – producer (#6)
- Jo Blaq – mixing, vocal recording (#12)
- C3prod – producer (#6)
- Tom Coyne – album mastering
- D.Clax – producer (#5)
- De-Capo Music Group – producer (#1)
- DOI – mixing (#1–7, #9–11)
- Akene 'The Champ' Dunkley – co-producer (#8)
- Jerry 'Wonda' Duplessis – producer (#8)
- Fifty 1 Fifty – producer (#9–10, #12)
- Keisuke Fujimaki – vocal recording (#4)
- Seiji Itabashi – assisting (#8, #11)
- Carlos 'Los' Jenkins – vocal recording (#12)
- Neeraj Khajanchi – additional vocal recording (#8), vocal recording (#11)
- T. Kura – vocal editing (#2)
- Sean 'Pen' McMillion – engineering (#5), vocal producer for Lloyd (#5)
- Michico – vocal producer (#2)
- Yoshinori Morita – vocal recording (#1, #6–7, #9)
- Taiji Okuda – Japanese production (#5), recording (#2–3, #10)
- Mario Parra – Che'nelle's vocal recording (#9)
- Lance Powell – assisting (#8)
- Andrew Robertson – assisting (#8)
- Mark Roger – vocal recording (#1)
- Serge 'Sergical' Tsai – recording (#8)
- Uta – producer (#2–4, #7, #11)
- Satoshi Yoneda – vocal editing (#2)

== Charts ==
=== Weekly charts ===
Weekly chart performance for Moriagaro
Chart (2013)	Peak position
Japanese Albums (Oricon)	5

=== Monthly charts ===
Monthly chart performance for Moriagaro
Chart (2013)	Peak position
Japanese Albums (Oricon)	18

== Sales ==
Sales figures for Moriagaro
Region	Certification	Certified units/sales
Japan Physical	—	49,010

== Release history ==
Release history and formats for Moriagaro
Region	Date	Format(s)	Version	Label	Ref.
Japan	July 17, 2013	Digital download; streaming; CD	Standard	EMI Japan; Universal Japan	
Japan	July 17, 2013	CD	Limited	EMI Japan; Universal Japan	
Taiwan	August 9, 2023	CD	Standard	Universal Taiwan	
