= After the Storm (Ai song) =

2013 song by Ai featuring Che'Nelle

Promotional single by Ai featuring Che'Nelle

from the album Moriagaro
- Released: May 22, 2013
- Genre: Pop
- Length: 3:40
- Label: EMI Japan; Universal
- Songwriter(s): Matthew "Damario" Quinney; Joseph Macklin; Carlos "Los" Jenkins; David "Davix" Foreman; Dashawn "Happie" White; Thomas "Tom Jack" Jackson
- Producer(s): Fifty1 Fifty; Ai Uemura

"After the Storm" is a song recorded by Japanese-American singer-songwriter Ai featuring Malaysian-Australian singer Che'Nelle. The song is produced by Fifty1 Fifty and Ai, was released as a promotional single on May 22, 2013, by EMI Records Japan from her tenth studio album, Moriagaro. The song was used for the Japanese release of the Hong Kong martial arts film The Grandmaster. "After the Storm" is a pop ballad and is Ai's first promotional single to be recorded fully in English.

== Background ==
The title "After the Storm" has the meaning of "the sun will come someday after the storm [...] because it will definitely be okay someday".

— Ai's comment on After the Storm

Ai previously released "Voice" in early 2013, serving as the lead single for her then-upcoming tenth studio album. The second single, "Dear Mama" was issued digitally in April 2013.

In May 2013, Ai announced she would be releasing a song for The Grandmaster. Along with this announcement, she announced the title of her tenth studio album, Moriagaro, and that "After the Storm" would be included on the album. Regarding being featured on the song, Che'Nelle commented, "I was thrilled when I heard about the duet from Ai because my wish came true. I've been saying that I want to collaborate with her for years!"

== Track listing ==
Digital download and streaming

1. "After the Storm" — 3:40

== Chart performance ==
"After the Storm" debuted at number 57 on the Billboard Japan Hot 100 for the week of May 26, 2013. It peaked at number 40 for the week of June 5, 2013. The song dropped to number 69 before falling off the chart, charting for three weeks.

| Chart (2013) | Peak position |
|---|---|
| Japan Hot 100 (Billboard Japan) | 40 |

== Release history ==
| Region | Date | Format | Label | Ref. |
|---|---|---|---|---|
| Japan | May 22, 2013 | Digital download; streaming | EMI Japan; Universal | |
