= World Dance =

2023 promotional single by Ai featuring Chanmina

Promotional single by Ai featuring Chanmina

from the album Respect All
- Language: Japanese; English
- Released: August 16, 2023
- Studio: St'em Studio (Tokyo, Japan)
- Genre: Dance-pop
- Length: 3:41
- Label: EMI
- Songwriters: Ai Carina Uemura; Mina Otomonai; Yaffle
- Producer: Yaffle

"World Dance" (stylized in all upper case lettering) is a song recorded by Japanese-American singer-songwriter Ai featuring South Korean-Japanese singer and rapper Chanmina. Produced by Yaffle, the song was released on August 16, 2023, by EMI Records as a promotional single from Ai's thirteenth studio album, Respect All.

== Background and release ==
In June 2023, Ai announced her thirteenth studio album, Respect All. Five of the ten tracks were originally announced. Within the next month, Chanmina's management staff announced she would be featured on a song with Ai. Japanese music news outlets later reported the collaboration on July 19.

Ai began teasing snippets of "World Dance" on social media on August 14. The song later was released as a promotional single on August 16.

In an interview with Barks regarding the release of Respect All, Ai revealed she had met Chanmina a few times at events, but "never had a detailed conversation with her." Ai eventually would ask her to record a song together, to which Chanmina agreed to. Ai recorded her vocals with Yaffle, who produced the song, while Chanmina recorded her vocals separately by Jigg.

== Music and lyrics ==
Barks described "World Dance" as a "truly diverse" and "danceable track". The First Take described the song as a "heart-touching dance number with life sized realism [lyrics]." Lyrically, the song is about "moving forward" and "dancing together".

== Promotion ==
On the same day "World Dance" was released, Universal Music Japan held a pre-order campaign via iTunes where 10 randomly selected people would receive signed merchandise from Ai's upcoming concert tour, the Respect All Tour.

== Live performances ==
Ai performed a solo version of "World Dance" during her studio live broadcast on YouTube the same day Respect All was released.

== Credits and personnel ==
Credits adapted from Tidal and album's liner notes.

- Ai Carina Uemura – vocals
- Mina Otomonai – vocals
- Yaffle – arrangement
- Jigg – vocal recording (Chanmina)
- Andrew Baldwin – mastering
- Masahito Komori – mixing

== Release history ==
Release history and formats for "World Dance"
Region	Date	Format	Label	Ref.
Various	August 16, 2023	Digital download; streaming	EMI; Universal	
