= Voice (Ai song) =

- Digital and limited version cover

Single by Ai

from the album Moriagaro
- Language: Japanese; English
- B-side: "Voice (Dark mix)" "For You"
- Released: February 13, 2013
- Recorded: 2012
- Genre: Dance-pop
- Length: 5:13
- Label: EMI Music
- Songwriter(s): Ai Carina Uemura
- Producer(s): Uta; Uemura

Ai singles chronology
"Beautiful Life" (2012)	"Voice" (2013)	"Dear Mama" (2013)

Music video
- "Voice" on YouTube

Alternate cover
- Physical regular edition cover

"Voice" is a song written and recorded by Japanese-American singer-songwriter Ai, released February 13, 2013, by EMI Music Japan. Produced by Uta and Ai, the song served as the theme song for the Japanese drama Yakō Kanransha.

Upon its release, "Voice" became one of Ai's best selling singles of the 2010s, peaking at number 2 on the Billboard Japan Hot 100 chart and number 13 on the Oricon Singles Chart. The song was certified Platinum by the Recording Industry Association of Japan (RIAJ) in 2014. Following EMI Music Japan's absorption into Universal Music Japan, "Voice" was Ai's final release under the record company.

== Background ==
In December 2012, EMI Music Japan announced Ai's new song "Voice" would serve as the theme song for the Japanese drama Yakō Kanransha. Ai herself confirmed the announcement during her Ai Christmas Dinner Show with Choir. EMI Japan also announced "Voice" would be released digitally on January 16, 2013 while a physical CD single would be released on February 13. A physical limited edition of "Voice" was announced additionally. The B-side track of the single, "For You" was used in a television commercial advertisement for Kubota.

== Music video ==
A music video was included on the limited CD of "Voice". In 2016, the music video was uploaded to Ai's Vevo channel on YouTube.

== Commercial performance ==
"Voice" debuted at number 46 on the Billboard Japan Hot 100 for the week of January 23, 2013. For the week of January 30, it jumped to number 26 before falling the next week to number 31. On February 13, "Voice" rose to number 13. For the week of February 20, "Voice" peaked at number 2 on the Japan Hot 100 with combined physical and digital sales.

On the Oricon charts, the physical release of "Voice" charted for 13 weeks, peaking at number 13. The song is currently Ai's fourth best selling single.

== Track listing ==
"Voice" – Digital single
No.	Title	Writer(s)	Producer(s)	Length
1.	"Voice"	Ai Carina Uemura	Uta; Uemura	5:13
Total length:				5:13

"Voice" – Regular edition
No.	Title	Writer(s)	Producer(s)	Length
1.	"Voice"	Uemura	Uta; Uemura	5:13
2.	"Voice" (Dark Mix)	Uemura	Uta; Uemura	5:17
3.	"For You"	Matthew "Damario" Quinney; Joseph Macklin; Carlos "Los" Jenkins; David "Davix" Foreman; Dashawn "Happie" White; Thomas "Tom Jack" Jackson; Uemura	Fifty1 Fifty	4:39
Total length:				15:06

"Voice" – Limited edition – Disc one
No.	Title	Writer(s)	Producer(s)	Length
1.	"Voice"	Uemura	Uta; Uemura	5:13
2.	"For You"	Matthew "Damario" Quinney; Joseph Macklin; Carlos "Los" Jenkins; David "Davix" Foreman; Dashawn "Happie" White; Thomas "Tom Jack" Jackson; Uemura	Fifty1 Fifty	4:39
3.	"My Desire" (Dinner Show with Choir)
4.	"Independent Woman" (Dinner Show with Choir)	Uemura
5.	"Wavin' Flag" (Dinner Show with Choir)	Andrew Bloch; Bruno Mars; Edmond Dunne; Jean Duval; Keinan Abdi Warsame; Phillip Lawrence
6.	"Why We Sing" (Dinner Show with Choir)
7.	"For My Sister" (Dinner Show with Choir)	Uemura; Judith Hill
8.	"Story" (Dinner Show with Choir)	Uemura
9.	"Happiness" (Dinner Show with Choir)	Uemura

"Voice" – Limited edition – Disc two
No.	Title	Writer(s)	Length
1.	"Voice" (Music video)	Uemura
2.	"Happiness" (Smile Version) (Music video)	Uemura

== Charts ==
=== Weekly charts ===
Chart performance for "Voice"
Chart (2013)	Peak position
Japan Adult Contemporary Airplay (Billboard Japan)	1
Japan Hot 100 (Billboard Japan)	2
Japan Singles Chart (Oricon)	13
Japan Top Singles Sales (Billboard Japan)	13

=== Year-end charts ===
Year-end chart performance for "Voice"
Chart (2013)	Peak position
Japan Adult Contemporary Airplay (Billboard Japan)	76
Japan Hot 100 (Billboard Japan)	56
Japan Radio Songs (Billboard Japan)	78

== Credits and personnel ==
Credits adapted from Tidal and Moriagaro liner notes.

- Ai Uemura – songwriting, lead vocals, production
- Uta – production, programing, composition
- Matthew "Damario" Quinney – songwriting
- Joseph Macklin – songwriting
- Carlos "Los" Jenkins, David "Davix" Foreman – songwriting
- Dashawn "Happie" White – songwriting
- Thomas "Tom Jack" Jackson – songwriting
- Fifty1 Fifty – production
- D.O.I – mixing
- Tom Coyne – mastering

== Certifications ==
Certifications and sales for "Voice"
Region	Certification	Certified units/sales
Japan (RIAJ) Single track	Platinum	250,000^{*}
^{*} Sales figures based on certification alone.

== Release history ==
Release history and formats for "Voice"
Region	Date	Format	Version	Label	Ref.
Japan	January 16, 2013	Radio airplay	Original	EMI Music Japan	
Japan	January 16, 2013	Digital download	Original	EMI Music Japan	
Japan	February 13, 2013	Digital download; CD	Original	EMI Music Japan	
Japan	February 13, 2013	CD	Limited	EMI Music Japan	
