= Start Again (Ai song) =

Single by Ai

from the album Respect All
- Language: Japanese; English
- Released: October 3, 2022
- Recorded: 2022
- Genre: Pop
- Length: 4:20
- Label: EMI
- Songwriters: Ai Carina Uemura; Uta
- Producers: Uta; Ai

Ai singles chronology
"Aldebaran" (2021)	"Start Again" (2022)	"Magnetic" (2022)

Music video
- "Start Again" on YouTube

"Start Again" is a song recorded by Japanese-American singer-songwriter Ai, released October 3, 2022, by EMI Records. Based on a true story of a mother and daughter's interaction with one another, the song was written by Ai with additional composition by producer Uta.

Upon its release, the song failed to enter any Billboard Japan or Oricon charts.

== Background and release ==
In February 2022, Ai released the promotional single "First Time", from her twelfth studio album, Dream. In promotion of the release, Ai teamed up with Nestlé to advertise Kit Kats within Japan. Despite the song being recorded entirely in English, "First Time" was featured in an animated commercial directed by Naoko Yamada, who directed A Silent Voice. The commercial was also Nestlé's first anime commercial.

Near the end of September 2022, Ai announced on her social media that a new single would be released on October 3, titled "Start Again". On the day of its release, Ai revealed the song would be used in a new set of animated commercials by Nestlé to further advertise Kit Kats within Japan. Similar to the previous animated commercials, Yamada served as the director.

== Lyrics ==
Lyrically, "Start Again" is based on a true story of a mother and daughter. 2,319 applicants applied to have their story shared by Nestlé in a television commercial. In a video interview by Nestlé, Ai commented she related to the story submission based on her experiences as a mother.

== Credits and personnel ==
Credits adapted from Tidal.

- Ai Carina Uemura – vocals, songwriting, production
- Uta – songwriting, production, recording arrangement
- D.O.I – mixing
- Randy Merrill – mastering

== Release history ==
Release history and formats for "Start Again"
Region	Date	Format	Label	Ref.
Various	October 3, 2022	Digital download; streaming	EMI	
