= Dear Mama (Ai song) =

Single by Ai

from the album Moriagaro
- Language: Japanese; English
- Released: April 17, 2013
- Recorded: 2012
- Genre: R&B; pop
- Length: 4:00
- Label: EMI Japan; Universal
- Songwriter: Ai Uemura
- Producers: C3prod; Uemura

Ai singles chronology
"Voice" (2013)	"Dear Mama" (2013)	"Story (English Version)" (2014)

"Dear Mama" (Note: Japanese: ママへ; Hepburn: Mama e) is a song written and recorded by Japanese-American singer-songwriter Ai. It was released on April 17, 2013, through EMI Records Japan as the second single from Ai's tenth studio album, Moriagaro. The song was used by the Lotte Corporation for commercial campaigns in Japan.

Upon its release, "Dear Mama" peaked at number 6 on the Billboard Japan Hot 100, becoming her sixth single to chart in the top ten of the Japan Hot 100.

== Background and release ==
In celebration of the 50th anniversary of Lotte Corporation's founding, the company contacted Ai to create a song to promote their anniversary as well as their Ghana milk chocolates. On April 16, 2013, the song was announced at a press conference hosted by Lotte. The song was announced for release the next day, April 17.

== Composition ==
Lyrically, "Dear Mama" is a tribute song to mothers. News Post Seven described the song as Ai "writing a letter directly to her mother". Ai commented that the song is very personal since her mother is a foreigner as she is from the United States.

== Cover art ==
On April 17, 2013, the cover art was revealed by news agencies within Japan. Natalie Music described the single's cover art as an "impressive childhood photo of Ai and [her mother] Barbara."

== Music video ==
An excerpt of the music video was released to YouTube in April 2013 with a full version released shortly after.

== Commercial performance ==
"Dear Mama" debuted at number 19 on the Billboard Japan Hot 100 for the week of April 24, 2013. The song fell to number 41 and then rose to number 37. "Dear Mama" peaked at number 6 on the Japan Hot 100 during its fourth week on the chart.

== Live performances ==
Ai performed the song in front of 50 mothers across Japan who attended the Lotte conference in 2013, including her mother, Barbara. Ai has also performed the song during her national tours in Japan, most recently during her Dream Tour.

== Track listing ==
- "Dear Mama" – 4:00

== Charts ==
Chart performance for "Dear Mama"
Chart (2013)	Peak position
Japan Adult Contemporary Airplay (Billboard Japan)	1
Japan Hot 100 (Billboard Japan)	6

== Sequel song ==
In February 2022, Ai released a sequel song to "Dear Mama" titled "Dear Papa". Both songs have similar lyrics and were produced by C3prod and Ai. Ai was motivated to record a version for her father after performing "Dear Mama" live on multiple occasions.

== Credits and personnel ==
Credits adapted from Tidal and Moriagaro liner notes.

- Ai Carina Uemura – songwriting, production, lead vocals
- C3prod – production, composition
- Ben-E – co-production
- Yoshinori Morita – vocal engineering
- Tom Coyne – mastering
- D.O.I – mixing

== Certifications ==
Certifications and sales for "Dear Mama"
Region	Certification	Certified units/sales
Japan (RIAJ) Single track	Gold	100,000^{*}
^{*} Sales figures based on certification alone.

== Release history ==
Release history and formats for "Dear Mama"
Region	Date	Format(s)	Label	Ref.
Various	April 17, 2013	Digital download; streaming	EMI Japan; Universal	
Japan	April 17, 2013	Radio airplay	Universal Japan	
