= First Time (Ai song) =

Promotional single by Ai featuring Riehata

from the album Dream
- Released: February 16, 2022
- Recorded: 2019
- Studio: Black Star Music (Studio City, California)
- Genre: R&B
- Length: 3:01
- Label: EMI
- Songwriters: Ai Uemura; Felisha "Fury" King; Fallon King
- Producer: Bernard "Harv" Harvey

"First Time" is a song recorded by Japanese-American singer-songwriter Ai, released February 16, 2022, by EMI Records as a promotional single from her twelfth studio album Dream. Produced by Bernard "Harv" Harvey, lyrically the song is about Ai's struggles during the start of her music career and how she was able to eventually find success for the first time. In promotion of the song, Ai teamed up with Nestlé to promote KitKat.

== Background and release ==
In 2019, Ai traveled to her hometown, Los Angeles, California to record content for a new album. While in Los Angeles, she collaborated with various songwriters, including Felisha King and Fallon King (of girl group Cherish), who co-wrote "Expectations" on Ai's 2021 extended play, It's All Me, Vol. 2. Wanting to get to know Ai more, the duo asked her about her career. Ai explained to them her struggles of her musical beginnings and how she eventually was able to find success. Inspired by the story, Felisha and Fallon co-wrote the song with Ai about personal struggles. Wanting a featured artist, Ai contacted her close friend, dancer and model Riehata.

== Composition and lyrics ==
"First Time" is an R&B song featuring a simple production. Lyrically, the song is about struggling to reach a goal and eventually overcoming obstacles to reach the goal for "the first time".

== Promotion ==
In Japan, "First Time" was featured on Nestlé commercials promoting Kit Kat. The commercial was directed by Naoko Yamada, who directed A Silent Voice. The commercial was also Nestlé's first anime commercial.

== Credits and personnel ==
Credits adapted from Tidal.

- Ai Uemura – vocals, songwriting
- Fallon King – songwriting
- Felisha "Fury" King – songwriting
- Bernard "Harv" Harvey – production
- Riehata – featured artist
- Mark Parfitt – mixing
- Randy Merill – mastering

== Release history ==
Release history and formats for "First Time"
Region	Date	Format	Label	Ref.
Various	February 16, 2022	Digital download; streaming	EMI	
