= 2011 in Japanese television =

Events in 2011 in Japanese television.

== Events ==
May

Date	Event
10	Goexpanda becomes Mascot of TV Asahi.

July

Date	Event
24	Analog television ceases broadcasting in 44 of the 47 Japanese prefectures, along with analog satellite broadcasting, at 12:00 JST. The shutdown of analog broadcasting was postponed in the prefectures of Iwate, Miyagi, and Fukushima to March 31, 2012 due to the 2011 Tohoku earthquake and its related nuclear accidents.

== Station closures ==
Station	Channel	Affiliation	Market	Date	Notes
JORH-TV	34 (UHF)	FNN/FNS	Hamamatsu, Shizuoka	July 24, 2011	The station was a satellite station of JOQH-TV; it was replaced by a translator operating on digital channel 22.
JOHX-TV	10 (VHF)	FNN/FNS	Kitakyushu, Fukuoka	July 24, 2011	The station was a satellite station of JOJY-TV; it was replaced by a translator operating on digital channel 29.
JOPM-TV	4 (VHF)	NNN/NNS	Shimonoseki, Yamaguchi	July 24, 2011	The station was a satellite station of JOPF-TV; the area is now served terrestrially by JOFR-DTV from Fukuoka.
JOEL-TV	1 (VHF)	NNN/NNS	Tsuruoka, Yamagata	July 24, 2011	The station was a satellite station of JOEF-TV; it was replaced by a translator operating on digital channel 16.
JOKY-TV; JOSY-TV; JOVX-TV; JOWL-TV; JOMY-TV; JOYS-TV; JOLY-TV	7 (VHF); 7 (VHF); 5 (VHF); 10 (VHF); 12 (VHF); 7 (VHF); 7 (VHF)	NNN/NNS	Asahikawa; Kushiro; Abashiri; Obihiro; Hakodate; Kitami; Muroran, Hokkaido	July 24, 2011	All stations were full-power satellites of JOKX-TV; they were replaced by a series of digital translators.
JOHE-TV; JOQL-TV; JOQM-TV; JOHW-TV; JOHO-TV; JOQM-TV; JOQF-TV	11 (VHF); 11 (VHF); 1 (VHF); 6 (VHF); 1 (VHF); 53 (UHF); 11 (VHF)	JNN	Asahikawa; Kushiro; Abashiri; Obihiro; Hakodate; Kitami; Muroran, Hokkaido	July 24, 2011	All stations were full-power satellites of JOHR-TV; they were replaced by a series of digital translators.
JOEE-TV	10 (VHF)	JNN	Onomichi, Hiroshima	July 24, 2011	The station was a satellite station of JOER-TV; it was replaced by a translator operating on digital channel 16.

== Debuts ==
Show	Station	Premiere Date	Type	Original run
Carnation	NHK	October 3	Drama	October 3, 2011 – March 31, 2012
Double-J	Nippon TV	June 29	Anime	June 29, 2011 – September 14, 2011
Fractale	Fuji TV	January 13	Anime	January 13, 2011 – March 31, 2011
Beyblade: Metal Fury	TV Tokyo	April 3	Anime	April 3, 2011 - April 1, 2012
Blue Exorcist	JNN	April 17	Anime	April 17, 2011 – October 2, 2011
Guilty Crown	Fuji TV	October 13	Anime	October 13, 2011 – March 22, 2012
Hunter × Hunter	Nippon TV	October 2	anime	October 2, 2011 – September 24, 2014
Infinite Stratos	TBS	January 6	Anime	January 6, 2011 – March 31, 2011
Itsuka Tenma no Kuro Usagi	TV Saitama	July 8	Anime	July 8, 2011 – September 24, 2011
Jewelpet Sunshine	TV Tokyo	April 9	Anime	April 9, 2011 – March 31, 2012
Kaizoku Sentai Gokaiger	TV Asahi	February 13	Tokusatsu	February 13, 2011 – February 19, 2012
Karakuri Samurai Sesshaawan 1	TV Shizuoka	July 3	Tokusatsu	July 3, 2011 – October 2, 2011
Kaseifu no Mita	Nippon TV	October 12	Drama	October 12, 2011 – December 21, 2011
Maji de Watashi ni Koi Shinasai!	tvk	October 1	Anime	October 1, 2011 – December 17, 2011
Mawaru Penguindrum	MBS	July 7	Anime	July 7, 2011 – December 22, 2011
Mitsu no Aji: A Taste of Honey	Fuji TV	October 13	Drama	October 13, 2011 – December 22, 2011
Nazotoki wa Dinner no Ato de	Fuji TV	October 18	Drama	October 18, 2011 – December 20, 2011
Pretty Rhythm: Aurora Dream	TV Tokyo	April 8	Anime	April 9, 2011 – March 31, 2012
Rebound	Nippon TV	April 27	Drama	April 27, 2011 – June 29, 2011
SKE48 no Magical Radio	Nippon TV	October 11	Variety show	October 11, 2011 – December 27, 2011
Suite PreCure	ABC TV	February 6	Anime	February 6, 2011 – January 29, 2012
Tiger & Bunny	MBS	April 2	Anime	April 2, 2011 – September 17, 2011
Toriko	Fuji TV	April 3	Anime	April 3, 2011 – March 30, 2014
Ultraman Retsuden	TV Tokyo	July 6	Tokusatsu	July 6, 2011 – June 26, 2013
Kamen Rider Fourze	TV Asahi	September 4	Tokusatsu	September 4, 2011 – August 26, 2012
Sengyō Shufu Tantei ~Watashi wa Shadow	TBS	October 21	Drama	October 21, 2011 – December 16, 2011
Un-Go	Fuji TV	October 13	Anime	October 13, 2011 – December 22, 2011
Watashi ga Ren'ai Dekinai Riyū	Fuji TV	October 17	Drama	October 17, 2011 – December 19, 2011
We Without Wings	Chiba TV	April 3	Anime	April 3, 2011 – June 19, 2011
Welcome to the El-Palacio	TV Tokyo	October 7	Drama	October 7, 2011 – December 23, 2011
Yu-Gi-Oh! Zexal	TV Tokyo	April 11	anime	April 11, 2011 – September 24, 2012

== Ongoing ==
- Music Fair, music (1964–present)
- Sazae-san, anime (1969–present)
- FNS Music Festival, music (1974–present)
- Panel Quiz Attack 25, game show (1975–present)
- Soreike! Anpanman. anime (1988–present)
- Downtown no Gaki no Tsukai ya Arahende!!, game show (1989–present)
- Crayon Shin-chan, anime (1992–present)
- Nintama Rantarō, anime (1993–present)
- Chibi Maruko-chan, anime (1995–present)
- Detective Conan, anime (1996–present)
- SASUKE, sports (1997–present)
- Ojarumaru, anime (1998–present)
- One Piece, anime (1999–present)
- Bleach, anime (2004–2012)
- Doraemon, anime (2005–present)
- Naruto Shippuden, anime (2007–present)
- Tamagotchi!, anime (2009–2012)
- Fairy Tail, anime (2009–2013)
- Shimajirō Hesoka, anime/children's variety (2010–2012)
- Magic Kaito, anime (2010–2012)

== Hiatus ==
Show	Station	Hiatus Date	Type	Original run
Dragon Ball Kai	Fuji TV	March 27	anime	April 5, 2009 - March 27, 2011

== Endings ==
Show	Station	Ending Date	Type	Original run
Blue Exorcist	JNN	October 2	Anime	April 17, 2011 – October 2, 2011
Double-J	Nippon TV	September 14	Anime	June 29, 2011 – September 14, 2011
Fractale	Fuji TV	March 31	Anime	January 13, 2011 – March 31, 2011
HeartCatch PreCure!	ABC TV	February 7	Anime	February 7, 2010 – January 30, 2011
Hime Chen! Otogi Chikku Idol Lilpri	TV Tokyo	March 27	Anime	April 4, 2011 – March 27, 2011
Infinite Stratos	TBS	March 31	Anime	January 6, 2011 – March 31, 2011
Itsuka Tenma no Kuro Usagi	TV Saitama	September 24	Anime	July 8, 2011 – September 24, 2011
Jewelpet Twinkle	TV Tokyo	April 2	Anime	April 3, 2011 – April 2, 2011
Kamen Rider OOO	TV Asahi	August 28	tokusatsu	September 5, 2010 – August 28, 2011
Karakuri Samurai Sesshaawan 1	TV Shizuoka	October 2	Tokusatsu	July 3, 2011 – October 2, 2011
Kaseifu no Mita	Nippon TV	December 21	Drama	October 12, 2011 – December 21, 2011
Kitty's Paradise peace	TV Tokyo	March 29	children's variety	October 7, 2008 – March 29, 2011
Maji de Watashi ni Koi Shinasai!	tvk	December 17	Anime	October 1, 2011 – December 17, 2011
Mawaru Penguindrum	MBS	December 22	Anime	July 7, 2011 – December 22, 2011
Mito Kōmon	TBS	December 19	jidaigeki	August 4, 1969 – December 19, 2011
Mitsu no Aji: A Taste of Honey	Fuji TV	December 22	Drama	October 13, 2011 – December 22, 2011
Nazotoki wa Dinner no Ato de	Fuji TV	December 20	Drama	October 18, 2011 – December 20, 2011
Rebound	Nippon TV	June 29	Drama	April 27, 2011 – June 29, 2011
Sgt. Frog	TV Tokyo	April 2	anime	April 3, 2004 - April 2, 2011
SKE48 no Magical Radio	Nippon TV	December 27	Variety show	October 11, 2011 – December 27, 2011
Tensou Sentai Goseiger	TV Asahi	February 6	tokusatsu	February 14, 2010 – February 6, 2011
Tiger & Bunny	MBS	September 17	Anime	April 2, 2011 – September 17, 2011
We Without Wings	Chiba TV	June 19	Anime	April 3, 2011 – June 19, 2011
Yu-Gi-Oh! 5D's	TV Tokyo	March 30	anime	April 2, 2008 – March 30, 2011

== See also ==
- 2011 in anime
- 2011 Japanese television dramas
- 2011 in Japan
- 2011 in Japanese music
- List of Japanese films of 2011
