= List of number-one digital singles of 2011 (Japan) =

This is a list of songs that reached #1 on the RIAJ Digital Track Chart chart in Japan in 2011. The highest-selling digital singles in Japan are published by Recording Industry Association of Japan. PC downloads and ringtone downloads are not eligible for the chart, only cellphone downloads (Chaku-uta Full) count for the chart.

The chart week runs from Wednesday to Tuesday. The final week of 2010, starting December 28, was merged with the following week (12/29-1/4) due to New Year's celebrations.

== Chart history ==
Issue date	Song	Artist(s)	Reference(s)
January 4	"I Wish for You"	Exile	
January 11	"Toilet no Kamisama"	Kana Uemura	
January 18	"Toilet no Kamisama"	Kana Uemura	
January 25	"Dear J"	Tomomi Itano	
February 1	"Why? (Keep Your Head Down)"	Tohoshinki	
February 8	"Distance"	Kana Nishino	
February 15	"Distance"	Kana Nishino	
February 22	"Ima no Kimi o Wasurenai"	Naoto Inti Raymi	
March 1	"Zutto."	Thelma Aoyama	
March 8	"Nanika Hitotsu"	Jamosa featuring Jay'ed & Wakadanna	
March 22	"Nanika Hitotsu"	Jamosa featuring Jay'ed & Wakadanna	
March 29	"Jet Coaster Love"	Kara	
April 5	"Kazoe Uta"	Mr. Children	
April 12	"Kazoe Uta"	Mr. Children	
April 19	"Love Letter. (Itsu Datte Aitakute)"	Sonar Pocket	
April 26	"Let's Try Again"	Team Amuse!!	
May 10	"Not Alone (Shiawase ni Narōyo)"	SMAP	
May 17	"Esperanza"	Kana Nishino	
May 24	"Maru Maru Mori Mori!!"	Kaoru to Tomoki, Tamani Mook	
May 31	"Everyday, Kachūsha"	AKB48	
June 7	"Mata Ashita..."	Juju	
June 14	"Maru Maru Mori Mori!"	Kaoru to Tomoki, Tamani Mook	
June 21	"Maru Maru Mori Mori!"	Kaoru to Tomoki, Tamani Mook	
June 28	"Go Go Summer!"	Kara	
July 5	"Go Go Summer!"	Kara	
July 12	"Go Go Summer!"	Kara	
July 19	"Fight Together"	Namie Amuro	
July 26	"Gomen ne.... (Omae tono Yakusoku)"	Sonar Pocket	
August 2	"Golden Smile"	Toshinobu Kubota feat. Exile Atsushi	
August 16	"Otakebi"	Yusuke	
August 23	"Flying Get"	AKB48	
August 30	"Flying Get"	AKB48	
September 6	"Flying Get"	AKB48	
September 13	"Itsuka kitto…"	Exile Atsushi	
September 20	"Ai o Tomenaide"	Kumi Koda	
September 27	"Ai o Tomenaide"	Kumi Koda	
October 4	"Rising Sun"	Exile	
October 11	"365 Nichi no Love Story"	Sonar Pocket	
October 18	"XXX"	L'Arc-en-Ciel	
October 25	"Kaze wa Fuiteiru"	AKB48	
November 1	"Kaze wa Fuiteiru"	AKB48	
November 8	"Tatoe Donnani..."	Kana Nishino	
November 15	"Anata e"	Exile	
November 22	"Love Song"	Funky Monkey Babys	
November 29	"Aruite Ikō"	Ikimono-gakari	
December 6	"Sit! Stay! Wait! Down!"	Namie Amuro	
December 13	"Love Story"	Namie Amuro	
December 20	"Love Story"	Namie Amuro	
December 27	"Yasashiku Naritai"	Kazuyoshi Saito	

== See also ==
- List of number one Reco-kyō Chart singles 2006–2009
