= Mamotte! Lollipop =

Japanese manga series

- Cover of the first volume by Del Rey Manga

まもって！ロリポップ (Mamotte! Roripoppu)
- Genre: Fantasy, romantic comedy
- Manga
- Written by: Michiyo Kikuta
- Published by: Kodansha
- English publisher: UK: Tanoshimi; US: Del Rey Manga
- Magazine: Nakayoshi
- Original run: October 2002 – June 2005
- Volumes: 7
- Anime television series
- Directed by: Noriyoshi Nakamura
- Produced by: Futoshi Nakabayashi; Reiko Takeshita; Shin Hieda
- Written by: Mitsutaka Hirota; Toshizo Nemoto; Yoshimi Narita; Yuka Yamada
- Music by: Kazuzo Hamano
- Studio: Sunshine Corporation
- Licensed by: Crunchyroll (Note: Formerly known as Funimation.)
- Original network: TV Setouchi, GBS, Chiba TV, Tokyo MX, Sun TV, KBS, KAB, Kids Station
- Original run: July 1, 2006 – September 23, 2006
- Episodes: 13
- Manga

Modotte! Mamotte! Lollipop!
- Written by: Michiyo Kikuta
- Published by: Kodansha
- Magazine: Nakayoshi
- Original run: July 3, 2006 – December 28, 2007
- Volumes: 6

Mamotte! Lollipop (まもって！ロリポップ, Mamotte! Roripoppu; lit. 'Protect! Lollipop') is a Japanese manga series written and illustrated by Michiyo Kikuta (菊田みちよ, Kikuta Michiyo). It was serialized in Kodansha's shōjo manga magazine Nakayoshi between 2002 and 2005.

The story revolves around female protagonist Nina Yamada, a seventh grader who accidentally swallows the Crystal Pearl thinking it is candy. The pearl is the goal of a sorcery examination where the students must retrieve it to pass. But since Nina has swallowed the pearl, she is now the target. Two of the examinees decide to protect her from the other students while they work on a potion to extract the pearl from Nina.

In 2006, Mamotte! Lollipop was adapted into a thirteen episode anime television series by Marvelous Entertainment and Sunshine Corporation under the direction of Noriyoshi Nakamura (中村憲由, Nakamura Noriyoshi). The anime series aired between July 1 and September 2006 on KAB. In 2009, Funimation dubbed the anime under the name Save Me! Lollipop.

== Plot ==
Nina Yamada is a seventh grade student who dreams about a prince charming who will always protect her, no matter what. One day, Nina accidentally swallowed a Crystal Pearl that she assumed was candy that came with her cake. But the Crystal Pearl was the goal of a sorcery examination. Nina becomes the new target of many probationer sorcerers and goes on for half a year. During this whole mix up, she meets two wizard boys named Zero and Ichii and comes to the conclusion that they protect her until a potion is made to remove the Crystal Pearl from her. However, this potion will take about six months to complete. Despite how long it took Zero and Ichii decided to protect Nina. Even at school and at home, Zero and Ichii protect Nina wherever she goes. Despite Nina finding it annoying that the two follow her around everywhere, it is for her own good.

== Characters ==
=== Main ===
Nina Yamada (山田二菜, Yamada Nina)
Voiced by: Yui Shoji (Japanese); Brittney Karbowski (English)
Nina is a seventh grade girl with an aggressive character, though she is also a caring, child-like, sweet teenager most of the time. She doesn't take insults very well. This is shown when she is often clashing with Zero, who usually calls her "stupid", "idiot", or "dork".
She is targeted by many sorcerer examinees as she accidentally swallowed the Crystal Pearl which they need in order to pass their professional wizard exam. Zero and Ichii are her guardians. Her hobbies include shopping, and stretching or doing sit-ups. Nina is extremely bad at all forms of housework, but she does not seem to realize this. She wishes to have a boyfriend who is kind, strong, and protective. However, she is caught in a love triangle with Zero and Ichii because they fit the type of boy she would like.
In the end she decides that she loves Zero. In one of the chapters in the manga, Nina and Zero kiss when Heart attacked them (causing a smoke screen) but Nina was unaware until Zero confessed to it at the end of Volume 5. In volume 6 Nina realizes that she does love him. In volume 7 of Mamotte! Lollipop, when she is 22 years old, she is depicted with shorter hair and comes for a summer break in the magic world.
Zero (ゼロ, Zero)
Voiced by: Miki Ōtani (Japanese); Eric Vale, Alison Viktorin (child) (English)
Zero has aqua blue hair and is the same age as Nina.
Zero has a very rude and cocky personality, often shown clashing with Nina. He owns little tolerance and is highly rebellious towards those who get in his in way. Zero is a particularly an impatient person and has an extremely short temper.
He is especially good at destruction magic and he is often shown making fun of Nina, therefore, always getting himself into arguments with her or most of the time getting a beating from Nina. But despite the way he treats Nina, it soon becomes clear that he is in love with her and truly wishes to protect her from any harm. Their relationship gradually becomes better throughout the series, and in the manga, he even admits his love to her. At the end of volume 7, when he is 23 years old, he proposes to her and she accepts.
Ichii (イチイ, Ichī)
Voiced by: Daisuke Nakamura (Japanese); J. Michael Tatum (English)
Ichii/Yakumo is two years older than Nina and Zero. He is depicted as a kindhearted boy. Ichii is exceedingly polite and mature, thus making him a gentleman.
He had a rough past, but opened up more ever since that day he met Zero, approximately three years ago. He has an older stepsister named Sarasa, whom he used to be in love with until she married Zero's older brother, Jeff. His specialty is "defense magic". Apparently, as well as Zero, it was shown that Ichii loved Nina as well, but Nina chose Zero. It was also shown on the side story on the last volume, that he married Rokka (a girl who was chasing Ichii in the start of the magical exam and thought Nina was trying to steal Ichii away from her).

=== Supporting ===
San Sherard (サン・シェラルド, San Sherarudo)
Voiced by: Momoko Saito (Japanese); Monica Rial (English)
San is a sorcerer specialized in summoning magic. She is seen summoning a giant cat, flying fish, wild catfish, and many other creatures. San has long dark blue hair with bangs in the front along with dark blue eyes. She is usually shown with a pink hair band in her hair with two pink bows at both sides of her head and a purple dress with white frills and a little pink bow on her chest. She wears white stockings with black Mary Jane like shoes. She carries a gold colored staff with a gold and blue color wheel shaped top to summon her creatures with her magic.
San was very happy to have a friend and played games with Forte, dragging him around to get her food. She had a harsh past because of her magical powers where she was younger. Her mother was very ill, and many of her relatives blamed her, saying that she was "cursed" because of her magic powers to summon creatures. Forte had burst out with anger as he overheard their relatives talking about how San was cursed. He took San, holding her hand to go to the tree where he became friends with her and told her that he would always be their for her. San then burst out in tears crying on Forte's shoulder wanting her mother. San always tries to smile because her mother told her that if she kept smiling, then something good would happen.
Nanase Akatsuki
Voiced by: Rie Miyoshi (Japanese); Sean Michael Teague, Carrie Savage (child) (English)
Nanase is Yakumo's partner in the final sorcery exam. He is constantly being mistaken as a girl, attracting the attention of many boys. Nanase also loathes Zero for revealing his true identity to the other boys as a kid.
Rokka Wan
Voiced by: Sakura Nogawa (Japanese); Luci Christian (English)
Rokka is a five year old witch who has the ability to use transformation magic, allowing her to turn into whatever she pleases. Rokka is madly in love with Ichi, and followed him into the human world to enter the magic exams, so that she could see him. Her partner for the exams is Go, who is also her butler. She often transforms into an older female in an attempt to seduce Ichi, but to no avail.
Go
Voiced by: Yukari Kokubun (Japanese), John Burgmeier (English)
Go is Rokka's butler and her partner in the sorcery exam. He was hired by Rokka's father in order to protect and take care of her.
Yakumo Ishi
Voiced by: Hidenobu Kiuchi (Japanese), Todd Haberkorn (English)
Yakumo is the partner of Nanase in the final sorcery exam. He specializes in Transformation Weapon Magic, which enables him to turn any object into a weapon. Yakumo is in love with Nina, whom does not reciprocate his feelings. This particular aspect of Yakumo annoys Ichi and Zero. He also hates Ichi, because while most are astounded by his weapon magic, he tells Yakumo that it's lame.
Riru
Voiced by: Tomomi Tauchi (Japanese); Cherami Leigh (English)
Riru is an examiner of the Magic Exams, who is able to use future magic. She and her familiar, Ruby, are first introduced when giving Nina the potion to remove the Crystal Pearl.
Ruby
Voiced by: Jamie Marchi (English)
Ruby is Riru's familiar crow.
Will
Voiced by: Shintarō Asanuma (Japanese); Robert McCollum (English)
Will is an examiner of the Magic Exams.
Salia Sherard
Voiced by: Keiko Utsumi (Japanese); Trina Nishimura (English)
Salia is San's late mother.
Aquamarine
Voiced by: Brina Palencia (English)
Aquamarine is Will's familiar cat.
Forte Sherard (フォルテ・シェラルド, Forute Sherarudo)
Voiced by: Noriko Namiki (Japanese); Greg Ayres, Anastasia Muñoz (child) (English)
Forte is San's partner and cousin. He is a good cook, and dislikes when San makes him cross-dress. After San's mother passed, Forte met up with San at the funeral. He was angered when her relatives were gossiping about her. Forte ran off with San into the woods. There, he told her it was okay to cry in front of him, and to only smile when she was having fun. He said that he knew her heart, and that he would always be beside her.
Hatsuka
Voiced by: Tomomi Tauchi (Japanese); Kate Oxley (English)
Nina's classmate from school. She has short dirty blonde hair.
Youka
Voiced by: Arise Satou (Japanese); Leah Clark (English)
Another classmate of Nina and Hatsuka. She has black hair worn in two buns.
Kuku
Voiced by: Masami Suzuki (Japanese); Colleen Clinkenbeard (English)
Kuku Is the childhood friend and so-called "fiance" of Zero and is partners with Toto. Kuku specializes in Animal Transformation Magic, Not much is to tell about Kuku's past, when she first met Nina she and her friends had mistaken her for a boy but then they realize her true gender after Zero rips her shirt in front of the whole class. All there is that Kuku and Zero were to have an arranged marriage, set up by both of their parents. Eventually, Zero refused and went on with his dream to become a professional sorcerer. Kuku, however, hasn't gotten over her feelings for Zero and eventually followed him to his school and, just like Rokka, was obsessed with her fiance and didn't stop to get what she wanted. Zero states that,"Our parents decided that we should get married. I DIDN'T." Where she interrupted,"It doesn't matter if our parents made the decision! A promise is still a promise!" Which clearly means that she doesn't care what Zero says. She still wants to marry him. In the end, she stops chasing Zero and falls in love with her partner, Toto. She has red hair that is worn in a long braid.
Toto
Voiced by: Takanori Ohyama (Japanese); Anthony Bowling (English)
Toto is Kuku's partner in sorcery magic. His magical abilities are unknown. He has been around to care for Kuku as long as he can remember. He always took care for her, which he soon developed a crush on her. Eventually, Kuku and Zero got engaged, but he wasn't angry at Zero or Kuku, in reality he was actually really sad. When he went with Kuku to find Zero, things got out of hand and Kuku turned the entire school into animals. Before that, Toto gets a lecture about love by Zura. This is what pushes him to reveal his romantic feelings to Kuku who then accepts.
Zura
Voiced by: Akiko Kobayashi (Japanese); Kristin Sutton (English)
Zura is a rather carefree familiar who enjoys eating. He refers to everyone as "Zura". Zura plays a rather minor role in both the anime and manga, though in the manga he is slightly responsible for Nina swallowing the Crystal Drop. His appearance is that of a small chibi looking dragon.
Sarasa
Voiced by: Maria Kawamura (Japanese); Stephanie Young (English)
Sarasa is Ichii's older stepsister and Jeff's wife.
Tomi
Voiced by: Shinobu Matsumoto (Japanese); Scott Freeman (English)
Jeff
Voiced by: Ryo Naito (Japanese); Charles Baker (English)
Jeff is Zero's older brother and Sarasa's husband.
Gomez
Voiced by: Nobuhiko Okamoto (Japanese); David Trosko (English)

== Media ==
=== Manga ===
The pilot chapter of Mamotte! Lollipop first appear in the weekly manga magazine Nakayoshi in October 2002. The series was then serialized in Nakayoshi beginning with the February 2003 edition (released on December 3, 2002) and concluded two years later in June 2005. The individual chapters where republished into seven volume collections by Nakayoshi's publisher Kodansha.

At the 2006 Comic-Con, Del Rey announced that it had acquired the rights to Mamotte! Lollipop. Del Rey released the first volume on February 27, 2007.

Mamotte! Lollipop Volumes

No.	Original release date	Original ISBN	English release date	English ISBN
1	July 1, 2003	978-4-06-364026-7	February 27, 2007	978-0-34-549623-2
POP 0: "Suddenly, Life Becomes Troublesome!?" (とつぜん、おさわがせライフ！？, Totsuzen, Osawagase Raifu!?) (October 3, 2002); POP 1: "May We Join You!?" (おジャマしまーす！？, Ojamashimāsu!?) (December 28, 2002); POP 2: "Ki, Ki-ki-ki, Kiss!?!?" (キ，キキキ，キスーッ！？！？, Ki, Ki-ki-ki, Kisū!?!?) (February 3, 2003); POP 3: "Open-air Bath Sexy Legend!?" (露天風呂セクシー伝説！？, Rotenburo Sekushī Densetsu!?) (March 3, 2003); POP 4: "The Midterm is a Big Panic!?" (中間試験は大パニック！？, Chūkanshiken wa Dai Panikku!?) (April 3, 2003); Extra: "Medical Magical" (めでぃかるまじかる, Medeikaru Majikaru)
2	January 6, 2004	978-4-06-364039-7	May 29, 2007	978-0-34-549666-9
POP 5: "The Summer Event is Super Stimulating!?" (夏の行事は超シゲキ的！？, Natsu no gyōji wa Chō shigeki-teki!?) (June 3, 2003); POP 6: "Love on the Beach is Wrtithing in Agony!?" (渚の恋は七転八倒！？, Nagisa no koi wa Shichitenhattō!?) (July 3, 2003); POP 7: "Nina is Zero and, Zero is Nina!?" (ニナがゼロで、ゼロがニナ！？, Nina ga Zero de, Zero ga Nina!?) (August 3, 2003); POP 8: "Zero and Ichii ~Meeting~" (ゼロ&イチイ 〜出会い〜」, Zero to Ichī ~Deai~) (September 3, 2003); POP 9: "Zero and Ichii ~Bond~" (ゼロ&イチイ 〜きずな〜, Zero to Ichī ~Kizuna~) (October 3, 2003); Extra: "Phantom-Thief Papillon" (怪盗パピヨン, Kaitō Papiyon)
3	April 30, 2004	978-4-06-364048-9	August 28, 2007	978-0-34-549667-6
POP 10: "Exciting Love Potion - Big Fever" (ほれ薬はドキドキ☆大フィーバー, Hore-yaku wa Dokidoki - Dai Fībā) (November 1, 2003); POP 11: "Here Comes, the Fiancé!?" (婚約者、あらわる！？, Fianse, Arawaru!?) (November 29, 2003); POP 12: "YEAH, Being an Animal is the Best!?" (気分は動物、最高YEAH！？, Kibun wa Dōbutsu, Saikō YEAH!?) (December 29, 2003); POP 13: "Fire of a Girl in Love - Nina!?" (炎の恋娘・ニナ！？, Honō no Koi Musume - Nina!?) (February 3, 2004); POP 14: "Heartbeat - A Maiden's First Kiss!?" (トキメキ♥乙女のファーストキッス！？, Tokimeki - Otome no Fāsuto Kissu!?) (March 3, 2004); Extra: "San on July 17th" (7月17日のサン, Shichi-Gatsu Jūshichi-nichi no San)
4	October 4, 2004	978-4-06-364061-8	November 27, 2007	978-0-34-549893-9
5	May 1, 2005	978-4-06-364071-7	March 11, 2008	978-0-34-549894-6
6	June 6, 2005	978-4-06-364081-6	May 20, 2008	978-0-34-549895-3
7	September 2, 2005	978-4-06-364088-5	August 26, 2008	978-0-34-549896-0

Modotte! Mamotte! Lollipop Volumes

No.	Japanese release date	Japanese ISBN
1	September 19, 2006	978-4-06-364121-9
POP 1: "Magic Exam, Again!?" (魔法試験、ふたたび！？, Mahō Shiken, futatabi!?); POP 2: "In Love - Heart-Pounding Panic" (恋して♥ドキドキパニック, Koishite - Dokidoki Panikku)
2	March 20, 2007	978-4-06-364140-0
3	July 6, 2007	978-4-06-364153-0
4	October 5, 2007	978-4-06-364164-6
5	February 6, 2008	978-4-06-364176-9
6	April 28, 2008	978-4-06-364184-4

=== Anime ===
North American box set released by Funimation

Mamotte! Lollipop was adapted into a thirteen episode anime television series in 2006. Produced by Marvelous Entertainment and Sunshine Corporation under the direction of Noriyoshi Nakamura (中村憲由, Nakamura Noriyoshi), the anime series was first broadcast on TV Setouchi every Saturday from 26:00 to 26:30 between July 1 and September 23, 2006. The episodes were rebroadcast by Tokyo MX, KBS, Sun Television, and several other stations within a few days of the initial broadcast.

On May 12, 2008, Funimation announced that it acquired Mamotte! Lollipop. Under the title Save Me! Lollipop, Funimation released the series as a single DVD box set on February 24, 2009.
