= Daisuke Nakamura =

Daisuke Nakamura may refer to:

- Daisuke Nakamura (actor)
- Daisuke Nakamura (fighter)
