= List of Blood-C episodes =

Japanese cover for the first home media volume of the series

Blood-C is a Japanese anime television series which aired for 12 episodes between July 8 and September 30, 2011. The third project in the Blood franchise, the series follows Saya Kisaragi as she fights monsters called the Elder Bairns. It was directed by Tsutomu Mizushima and produced by Production I.G. The characters were designed by manga artist group Clamp, while Kazuchika Kise handled the animation character design and Takayuki Goto was the chief animation director for the series. All episodes were co-written by Clamp member Nanase Ohkawa and Blood+ director Junichi Fujisaku.

Blood-C premiered on a late night slot on MBS and TBS. It was livestreamed simultaneously in North America, the United Kingdom, Canada, Australia, New Zealand and South Africa through the Western branch of Niconico. Other channels that showed Blood-C in 2011 were Chubu-Nippon Broadcasting and Kumamoto Asahi Broadcasting's RRK station. Wowow ran a marathon broadcast between September 22 and 29, 2013, followed by its sequel film Blood-C: The Last Dark and the original Blood: The Last Vampire anime film.

The series' home video releases on Blu-ray and DVD were published in Japan by Aniplex. The series released in six volumes between September 28, 2011, and February 22, 2012. The series' English dub and North American licensing was handled by Funimation. A box set containing the whole series released for Blu-ray and DVD on January 22, 2013. In Australia, the series was licensed by Madman Entertainment, releasing as a box set for DVD and Blu-ray on April 17, 2013. In Europe, the series was distributed by Anchor Bay Entertainment through Manga Entertainment. It released as a box set on DVD and Blu-ray on June 10, 2013.

== Episodes ==
No.	Title	Directed by	Animation directed by	Original release date
1	"O Ye Winds of Heaven"; Transliteration: "Ama Tsukase" (Japanese: あまつかせ)	Tsutomu Mizushima	Takayuki Goto	July 8, 2011
Saya Kisaragi is a cheerful, honest and kind girl, who trains as a shrine maiden under her father Tadayoshi Kisaragi, spending her days quietly with her schoolmates. However, those outside her family are oblivious to her secret life as a mysterious swordswoman dedicated to slaying monsters called Elder Bairns. At night, she faces and eventually defeats a Jizō Elder Bairn.
2	"It Is for Thy Sake"; Transliteration: "Kimi ga Tame" (Japanese: きみがため)	Yukina Hiro	Shinji Itadaki	July 15, 2011
Saya is seen hunting down a Bat Elder Bairn at night. The next day, she stops by the coffee shop to see Fumito Nanahara, who offers her to try some pink cubed guimauve, before going to school. During lunch, Itsuki Tomofusa, the class president, tries in vain to woo Saya. However, Saya is more attracted to Shinichirō Tokizane, another classmate who rarely speaks but watches her from afar. That night, Saya takes down a Flower Elder Bairn.
3	"As for Man"; Transliteration: "Hito wa Isa" (Japanese: ひとはいさ)	Hiroyuki Hata	Mariko Ishikawa & Minoru Ueda	July 22, 2011
After enjoying breakfast with Tadayoshi at the coffee shop, Saya runs late for chemistry class, having to stay after class to clean up for her homeroom teacher Kanako Tsutsutori. Saya invites a few of her classmates to the coffee shop, where they learn that a baker has gone missing. Come nightfall at an abandoned train station, she finds out that a Train Elder Bairn is responsible for his disappearance. She fails to save the baker's life, but manages to slay the Train Elder Bairn, who speaks to Saya about "honoring the covenant" before dying.
4	"That Has Made Me Sad"; Transliteration: "Nageke Tote" (Japanese: なげけとて)	Directed by : Kōhei Hatano; Storyboarded by : Toshiya Niidome	Takaaki Fukuyo	July 29, 2011
Saya asks Tadayoshi about the meaning behind "honoring the covenant" mentioned by the Train Elder Bairn, but Tadayoshi brushes her off. On the way to lunch, her classmates discuss the disappearance of the baker. Saya falls off a tree after climbing it, but is saved by Shinichirō, sharing her food with him to show her gratitude. That night, a Gryphon Elder Bairn and his two minion Elder Bairns devour a group of fishermen, holding one of them captive. While Saya confronts the three, the Gryphon Elder Bairn mentions that the covenant between humans and Elder Bairns, called the Shrovetide, must be honored.
5	"Meeting in the Way"; Transliteration: "Meguri Ahite" (Japanese: めぐりあひて)	Yasutaka Yamamoto	Junko Watanabe	August 5, 2011
Saya begins to experience headaches related to visions, so she decides to relax the coffee shop and see Fumito. Later, Saya successfully defeats a powerful Monk Elder Bairn after a difficult battle, though she continues to ponder about the Shrovetide referenced by the Elder Bairns. At school the next day, Nene & Nono Motoe are ecstatic that the gym class will be replaced with a study hall period due to rainy weather. As it is suggested to tell scary stories, Kanako retells a legend of the Elder Bairns, leading Saya to experience another severe headache before fainting. When Nene visits Saya the next day, both of them are attacked by a Centipede Elder Bairn.
6	"Dashed by Fierce Winds"; Transliteration: "Kaze o Itami" (Japanese: かぜをいたみ)	Takayuki Hamana	Chieko Miyakawa	August 19, 2011
Saya quickly searches for her sword but fails to prevent the Centipede Elder Bairn from devouring Nene's head before killing it. After taking a day off to rest, Saya returns the next day only to find that Nono has also been absent from school. Kanako informs the class that the school is closing down due to recent disappearances. Saya is interrupted on her way home by a mysterious dog, which she has encountered everyday on the way to school, now revealing its ability to converse with her. Soon after, Nono appears and confronts Saya about Nene's whereabouts. A Shadow Elder Bairn forms from Nono's shadows, attacking and swallowing several passersby. Saya kills the Shadow Elder Bairn, but she is unable to save Nono's life in the process.
7	"As Pitiless As the Storm"; Transliteration: "Ukarikeru" (Japanese: うかりける)	Hisaya Takabayashi	Toshiya Washida & Akiko Nagashima	August 26, 2011
While lamenting the deaths of Nene & Nono, Saya recalls making a promise to protect everyone but struggles to remember to whom she made that promise. The dog approaches Saya to oversee that a certain wish of hers could be granted. The next day, as Tadayoshi tells her to keep her sword on her at all times, she arrives at school to find it empty besides Kanako. On the way back, Saya witnesses a policeman suddenly stabbed right in front of her, faulted by a Samurai Elder Bairn, who casts doubt in her mind over whether to trust Tadayoshi. As Saya manages to regain her resolve and kill the Samurai Elder Bairn, who tells her to ask Tadayoshi who she really is with his last breath, she is discovered by Shinichirō.
8	"Within the World"; Transliteration: "Yo no Naka yo" (Japanese: よのなかよ)	Hiroyuki Hata	Masataka Kawano & Minoru Ueda	September 2, 2011
Saya tells Shinichirō about the Elder Bairns, and he offers to be her confidant. Returning home, she finds Tadoyoshi collapsed on the floor, though he passes it off as a dizzy spell. Later, the dog talks to Saya during her bath, asking her what would happen if she broke the promise she made. As Saya experiences another headache, she recalls that the promise came with a reward and a punishment. After a few days without Elder Bairn attacks, Saya returns to school. As she walks with Yūka Amino to class, a Spider Elder Bairn soon appears and attacks the students, killing several of them. With no escape available, Saya is forced to unsheathe her sword in front of her friends to fight the Spider Elder Bairn.
9	"Against My Wish"; Transliteration: "Kokoro ni Mo" (Japanese: こころにも)	Yukina Hiro	Shinji Itadaki & Takahisa Katagiri	September 9, 2011
Saya struggles to keep the Spider Elder Bairn from killing more students as she becomes tormented with flashbacks, eventually being able to kill the Spider Elder Bairn. Yūka is among the people who died, yet only Saya, Itsuki and Kanako survived the attack. Saya returns home and laments to the dog, who poses more questions about her nature. She is suddenly visited by Shinichirō, who did not attend school. She comes to the realization that only her class had been called to school that day. Shinichirō attempts to confess his love Saya, but this halted by the arrival of Tadayoshi. Saya then questions why she does not know her mother's name.
10	"Since 'Tis by Its Breath"; Transliteration: "Fuku Kara ni" (Japanese: ふくからに)	Directed by : Yoshiaki Kyōgoku; Storyboarded by : Takayuki Hamana	Kyoko Kotani, Akiko Kumada & Fumi Morita	September 16, 2011
As Saya wonders why she does not know her mother's name or appearance, she is attacked by a Skeleton Elder Bairn, who kills Shinichirō when he returns to check up on her. After killing the Skeleton Elder Bairn, Saya begins to question her identity before passing out. The next day, she is visited by Fumito, who consoles her by giving her some coffee and guimauve before going to see Tadayoshi. As Tadoyoshi goes off somewhere, Kanako stops by the coffee shop and asks Saya to see some scrolls in her shrine. Kanako reveals that all the books in the shrine supposedly detailing the Elder Bairns are all blank and new. A shocked Saya is led outside and confronted by the still-living Nene & Nono.
11	"Whom Then Are There Now"; Transliteration: "Tare o Kamo" (Japanese: たれをかも)	Directed by : Atsushi Kobayashi; Storyboarded by : Yasutaka Yamamoto	Junko Watanabe & Chieko Miyakawa	September 23, 2011
Kanako, Nene & Nono and Shinichirō reveal themselves to be part of a "main cast", playing roles for the purpose of awakening Saya's memories in order to be rewarded with their own desires. All the "main cast" members who died are still alive, while the expendable extras are really dead. As they force Saya to drink the blood of the Elder Bairns, which she had allegedly been drinking whenever she passed out, they reveal she is linked to the Shrovetide, a period in time when the Elder Bairns can freely devour humans. As Saya starts to remember things as a result of drinking the blood, a Cerberus Elder Bairn appears and the group is confronted by Itsuki and Yūka, who question their motives for interfering with the project.
12	"If Remembering Me"; Transliteration: "Wasurejino" (Japanese: わすれじの)	Tsutomu Mizushima	Akiko Nagashima, Ryoko Nakano; Shinji Itadaki & Takayuki Goto	September 30, 2011
Saya finally remembers her nature as an Elder Bairn. She had been captured and brainwashed by Fumito, who wished to free her from the Shrovetide. Shinichirō and Nene & Nono are eaten by the Cerberus Elder Bairn for disobeying Fumito's orders. Despite Saya killing the Cerberus Elder Bairn, Kanako dies at the hands of Tadayoshi, revealed to be a half-bred Elder Bairn that has gone berserk from drinking Saya's blood. After a fierce battle between Saya and Tadayoshi, he reveals his paternal attachment to her before he dies. Fumito makes his escape with Yūka by car, sending an army of multiplying Bunny Elder Bairns to kill everyone in town. Itsuki confesses his love for Saya before sacrificing his life for her. After beating the Bunny Elder Bairns, Saya attacks Fumito before he escapes with Yūka by helicopter. Fumito shoots Saya in the eye before revealing that the guimauve was made from the blood of Elder Bairns. Left alone on the island, Saya tends to her eye wound and prepares to make her next move to hunt down Fumito. The dog says that it is now time for the next wish since Saya already fulfilled her first wish to stay herself.
