= Oresama Teacher =

Japanese manga series

- Cover of the first Japanese volume, featuring Mafuyu Kurosaki

俺様ティーチャー (Ore-sama Tīchā)
- Genre: Romantic comedy
- Manga
- Written by: Izumi Tsubaki
- Published by: Hakusensha
- English publisher: AUS: Madman Entertainment; NA: Viz Media
- Magazine: Hana to Yume
- English magazine: Shojo Beat
- Original run: July 2007 – February 5, 2020
- Volumes: 29

Oresama Teacher (Japanese: 俺様ティーチャー, Hepburn: Ore-sama Tīchā) is a Japanese manga written and illustrated by Izumi Tsubaki, serialized in shōjo manga magazine Hana to Yume from July 2007 to February 2020. The manga is published in English by Viz Media and Madman Entertainment, and in French by Delcourt. The manga ended in February 2020, with its chapters collected in 29 bound volumes under the "Hana to Yume Comics" label.

== Plot ==
Mafuyu Kurosaki is a high school student who was a gang leader in Saitama Prefecture. However, after being caught by police and expelled from school, Mafuyu is told to transfer to Midorigaoka Academy by her mother under the threat that she would be disowned if she ever gets into another fight. Determined to live a proper high school life, she runs into Takaomi Saeki, her homeroom teacher who turns out to be her former childhood friend neighbor, a former delinquent and the reason why she became one herself. She soon discovers that Midorigaoka Academy is full of problematic students. Under Saeki's orders, she becomes a member of the school's Public Morals Club, whose goal is to clean up delinquency and to eventually improve enrollment figures.

Starting in volume 5, there have been special 4-koma segments included in every tankōbon release titled Tōzainanboku (東西南北) which tells about the interactions between Saitama Prefecture's East, West, South, and North High students.

== Characters ==
=== Public Morals Club ===
Mafuyu Kurosaki (黒崎 真冬, Kurosaki Mafuyu)
Voiced by: Eri Kitamura (drama CD)
Kurosaki was a renowned bancho (juvenile delinquent leader) from Saitama Prefecture's East High. After she is caught by the police, her mother transfers her to Midorigaoka Academy where she would get to live on her own as a normal high school student on the condition that she would be disowned if she begins fighting again.^{[ch. 1]} She aspires to be a fashionable girl, however, she discovers that Midorigaoka is full of delinquents. In order to avoid getting caught fighting while on duty (for Public Morals Club), she dons a rabbit mask, calling herself "Super Bun" (ウサちゃんマン, Usa-chan Man), or cross-dresses as a male delinquent "Natsuo" (夏男). She keeps these identities hidden from everyone except for Takaomi,^{[ch. 8]} although Hayasaka and Okegawa cannot help but notice an intense battle aura around her as well as her battle instincts. Kurosaki is not good at interacting with female classmates. Under the handle "Snow White", Kurosaki corresponds regularly with a pen pal named "Strawberry Love" using a carrier pigeon which she saved from drowning.^{[ch. 9]}
Takaomi Saeki (佐伯 鷹臣, Saeki Takaomi)
Voiced by: Ken Narita (drama CD)
The title character of the story, Saeki is Kurosaki's homeroom teacher. He is regarded by his students as scary. Prior to the series, he was named Takaomi Gojou, a strong and notorious high school delinquent who lived next door to Kurosaki. He is the cause of Kurosaki's delinquent character, having taught her how to fight and defend, all to his amusement.^{[ch. 3]} He makes a wager with the chairman of the school that he can double the school's enrollment in three years, but if he loses, he will not be paid for five years.^{[ch. 5]} He forms the Public Morals Club with Kurosaki and Hayasaka as founding members.^{[ch. 6]}
Hayasaka (早坂, Hayasaka)
Voiced by: Takahiro Mizushima (drama CD)
Hayasaka is a lone wolf delinquent that Kurosaki befriends shortly after transferring. He has natural blonde hair. Hayasaka likes to take enemy attacks head on, stating that he feels like he's running away when he dodges. He and Kurosaki are forced to be founding members of the Public Morals Club. He is also notably good at embroidery that he was recruited by the Crafts club.^{[ch. 6]} He kept his personal background a secret, going as far as to not reveal his first name. It has been implied that he comes from a rich family but has trouble speaking with his parents, and avoids the topic about siblings. He has a deep respect for both Super Bun and Natsuo, unaware that both are the same person. Later, it is revealed that his full name is Kaori Hayasaka (早坂 香, Hayasaka Kaori), a common name for girls.
Kyotaro Okegawa (桶川 恭太郎, Okegawa Kyōtarō)
Voiced by: Kenta Miyake (drama CD)
He was the bancho of Midorigaoka Academy before being defeated by Natsuo but then regains the position shortly after. Kurosaki learns that he is romantic at heart, and adores cute things such as the characters in the fictional show Nekomata. He is the owner of the pigeon that Kurosaki saved a year ago and is Kurosaki's pen pal "Strawberry Love", although neither of them are aware of the connection.^{[ch. 9]} Aside from a selected few, he is the only one who knows about Kurosaki disguising as Natsuo. He calls Kurosaki Morse (モールス). Due to a mishap caused by his subordinate and Public Morals Club members, Okegawa fails his final exam and now has to repeat his third year over, while still being the school's bancho. Yui calls him "Kyon-kyon" (きょんきょん, Kyon kyon).
Shinobu Yui (由井 忍, Yui Shinobu)
Voiced by: Tomokazu Sugita (drama CD)
Yui is a self-proclaimed ninja who is completely loyal to Student Council President and was once a member of the Student Council himself.^{[ch. 29]} He joins the Public Morals Club in an attempt to take them down to help out the student council president. He infiltrates the Public Morals Club by befriending Kurosaki and Hayasaka. Despite his appearances and stoic expression, he proves to be just as much of a goof as the other two. He eventually betrays the Public Morals Club, but feels guilty as he realizes Kurosaki and Hayasaka's genuine attitude towards him. He knows about Kurosaki's two other identities and her delinquent past.
Aki Shibuya (渋谷 亜希, Shibuya Aki)
Voiced by: Atsushi Abe (drama CD)
Aki Shibuya, who goes by the nickname Akkī (アッキー, Akkī), is a student who is originally from East Middle School and comes to Midorigaoka Academy to seek Kurosaki. He knows that Kurosaki was East High's bancho and sought her out hoping to become her subordinate. His philosophy was that if there is a strong person that he could stick to, it would solve all problems. Shibuya is popular with girls because he easily gives compliments. This causes conflicts involving angry boyfriends whom the girls subsequently break up with after being complimented by Shibuya. He can recognize people's heights and measurements even in picture, leading him to know that Kurosaki is Natsuo and Super Bun after noting their similarities. Shibuya is also skilled in applying makeup.

=== Student Council ===
Miyabi Hanabusa (華房 雅, Hanabusa Miyabi)
Voiced by: Ayumu Murase (drama CD)
He was the Student Council president and the son of the School Chairman. He is aware of the true history of Midorigaoka and the bet that Saeki proposes. Despite his delicate looks, he can be quite cunning and is capable of 'enslaving' people with only a stare. Often seen smiling, it is hard to tell what goes on in his mind. It is unknown whether he truly cares for Student Council members as he has them try to destroy the Public Morals Club one at a time rather than simultaneously or as a group which make it seems like he's counting on the Club to help the Student Council members overcome their personal issues. Saeki analogizes him to Peter Pan because of his appearance and personality.
Shuntarō Kōsaka (高坂 俊太郎, Kōsaka Shuntarō)
He is serious to a fault, his plans are described as 'only good on paper'. He will panic when presented with an unanticipated problem beyond his plans. He was the one responsible for the plan to ruin the school festival by leading a gang war within the school. After Hanabusa tells him to hit Kurosaki in the face with a pie impromptu during a brawl, he learned to not expect things to always go according to plan.
Wakana Hōjō (北条 若菜, Hōjō Wakana)
A member of the Student Council who, along with Yui, seems to be the closest to the President and has been with them for a long time. Initially she guarded Hanabusa on a request from her father who is an underling to Hanabusa's mother, but now does it because she wants to. Hōjō is often seen carrying a bamboo sword. She is a tough fighter, serious and strong-willed. She is, at first, unwilling to believe that Yui had betrayed the President and views him as a traitor because of it. It is hinted that she harbors a crush on Yui. As the appointed clubs supervisor, she stamps the Public Morals Club's papers out of obligation towards Super Bun for drawing attacks away from her during the final day of club inspections and also because she saw the fully completed sheet regarding the club's activities, members, and achievements which eliminated any grounds for her to reject the club. She becomes the new Student Council president after Hanabusa retired.
Reito Ayabe (綾部 麗人, Ayabe Reito)
Voiced by: Kazuyuki Okitsu (drama CD)
He is the only unwilling member of the Student Council. He has a strong disliking towards anything dirty. Because of this anger towards uncleanliness, he is able to become physically stronger while cleaning. That is also why he carries a broom, which he named Fujishima-san, in a guitar case around.^{[ch. 63]} Kurosaki is the only person other than Hanabusa who knows about his "cleaning attacks". When Hanabusa saw the attacks, he used the information to blackmail him into joining the Student Council while Kurosaki is willing to stay quiet but has him make bento for the Public Morals Club since he insists on paying some form of "hush money" to ensure she stays silent. He is the oldest of six siblings and is used to taking care of the house because of their constantly working parents. Due to issues with his siblings, he left home to stay in school dormitory.^{[ch. 64]} Ayabe is Midorigaoka boys dorm manager. He speaks in Kansai dialect and Kurosaki called him Ayaben (あやべん, Ayaben) because of it.
Kanon Nonoguchi (野々口 歌音, Nonoguchi Kanon)
In elementary school, she believed that one day a prince will come to get her just like the story in her treasured picture book which she kept with her all the time. Because of that, she was teased by the boys in class, especially by the leader of the boys Nogami who apparently had feelings for her. As things progressed his teasing got worse which got him finally beaten by her. The boys watching this thought Nogami was getting bullied and tried to help him, eventually tearing her favorite book in front of her. She brutally defeated the boys, then coldly declared that boys are weak. Since then she snarks at the mere mention of princes and harbors a severely low opinion of males in general, the only exception being the Student Council President whom she is willing to serve for. The incidence with Kiyama High leads her to restore her belief in prince and meet Natsuo, a boy whom she thought as her ideal prince.
Runa Momochi (百地 瑠奈, Momochi Runa)
Momochi is famous in Midorigaoka because of her pretty looks and admirable academic achievement. She was a childhood friend of Hayasaka. Momochi has a tough life after her father leaves the family and thus turning her mother abusive. After her mother remarried, her situation gets better but it was too late to heal the scar in her heart. She turned into a twisted person who wishes other people to be more miserable than her. She can perform hypnosis.
Komari Yukioka (雪岡 小鞠, Yukioka Komari)
Voiced by: Aoi Yūki (drama CD)
She is the smallest out of the Student Councils and is often fed sweets by the President. Her cutesy charm infatuates anyone to the point of enslaving them. Although she can talk, she somehow compels people into doing things for her while remaining mute. She takes an interest in Shibuya because he is the only guy who doesn't get infatuated by her charm and saw through her plan to get him to be a mole for the Student Council. Once she speaks, it is revealed that she is a pervert who wants to touch Hanabusa's buttock and likes to comment on other male students' bodies. Currently, only Shibuya and Hanabusa know of her quiet facade however, she is beginning to regain normal speech functions. She is Midorigaoka girls dorm manager.

=== Midorigaoka Students ===
Tomohiro Kawauchi (河内 智広, Kawauchi Tomohiro)
Voiced by: Tetsuya Kakihara (drama CD)
A follower of Okegawa and is considered the number 2 within his gang. Kawauchi was a blonde delinquent in middle school but he intended to live a normal high school life prior to meeting Okegawa. He triggers the fight between Midorigaoka and Kiyama High during the cultural festival in order to challenge Okegawa because he feels disappointed in him after he was defeated by Natsuo. In later chapter, he and Okegawa become classmates because the latter had to repeat his third year. He is the series' icon of betrayal.
Daikichi Gotō (後藤 大吉, Gotō Daikichi)
Gotō is the number 3 within Okegawa's gang. He is labeled as the kindest person in Midorigaoka. Born as a very lucky person, Gotō is the President of Prize-winning Club. He can get anything he wants just from being lucky but he is quite an oblivious person. He is often seen together with Kawauchi.

=== Saitama Schools ===
==== East High ====
Kōhei Kangawa (寒川 航平, Kangawa Kōhei)
Voiced by: Ryōhei Kimura (drama CD)
When Kurosaki was the bancho, he served as number 2 in the gang. After she left, he assumed her position. In the past, he challenged Kurosaki to a fight and was defeated, subsequently decided to join East High right after. He is an out-going, openly affectionate person. Although he is often seen messing around and in a good mood, he is considerate of Kurosaki's circumstances and tried to prevent her from getting involved in the 'war' between East High and West High. He feels hurt when he finds out that Kurosaki spends her first day of summer break with Sakurada because he wants to be the first person Kurosaki goes to when she comes back.
Yūto Maizono (舞苑 誘人, Maizono Yūto)
Voiced by: Daisuke Ono (drama CD)
He was number 3 within Kurosaki's old gang, currently number 2. He is two years older than Kurosaki and is the only upperclassman within the gang whom she calls with honorifics. A self-proclaimed masochist, he often tries to get Kurosaki to take her anger out on him. He acquainted Hayasaka and Okegawa one day while trying to visit Kurosaki to deliver cookies made by Yamashita. He, like the rest of Kurosaki's old gang, deeply respects and admires Kurosaki despite her no longer being the bancho and tells Hayasaka that it has been difficult for him to adjust to life without her.
Kotobuki Ōkubo (大久保 寿, Ōkubo Kotobuki)
Voiced by: Tomohisa Hashizume (drama CD)
Ōkubo is a kind boy with extreme bad luck. He is Maizono's classmate and has a good relationship with Kangawa Minato, Kouhei's younger sister. He once went camping with Maizono and Yamashita and got caught in a rainstorm, leading him to meet boys in Midorigaoka's student dorm. In recent chapters, It seems that he has gain better luck.
Takumi Yamashita (山下 匠, Yamashita Takumi)
Voiced by: Daisuke Nakamura (drama CD)
Yamashita is a cooking genius. He is one of the loyal followers of Kurosaki's past gang and also Maizono and Ōkubo's classmate. He once made cookies which are supposed to be delivered by Maizono to Kurosaki but ended up received by Hayasaka and Okegawa. Beside cooking, he is good at making anything by hands.

==== West High ====
Asahi Sakurada (桜田 旭, Sakurada Asahi)
Sakurada is technically the bancho of West High, a rival school to East High. He is known to be very clumsy and his gang members consider him more as a mascot rather than bancho. Kurosaki's only memory of him were his heart patterned boxers the day he challenged her and fell. He often cross-dresses and is aware that he looks good when he does it. Despite being a klutz, his gang members understand him well and love him nonetheless, often surrounding him in fights and protecting him from attacks. He has, however, shown that when pushed to the edge he will show great leadership skills and bravery.
Masayoshi Ōmiya (大宮 正義, Ōmiya Masayoshi)
Ōmiya is one of Sakurada's subordinates. He specializes in school infiltration because he has an outgoing personality which allows him to be easily accepted by anyone. He cross-dresses along with Sakurada when they infiltrate North High.

==== South High ====
Minato Kangawa (寒川 港, Kangawa Minato)
She is Kōhei's younger sister by one year who harbors a crush towards Ōkubo. At first, Minato didn't know that her brother is a banchō in his school but then comes to realization after meeting her brother's delinquent friends when she visited East High.
Ryūnosuke Himeji (姫路 龍之介, Himeji Ryūnosuke)
He is South High's student council president who is also Maizono's close friend since elementary school. His stoic smart guy appearance does not match with his personality. He speaks of what appears to be the opposite of his real intention but able to convey his true feelings via texting. So far, Maizono understands those traits and has been perfectly fine getting along with him.

==== North High ====
Takaaki Aoi (葵孝明, Aoi Takaaki)
He is bancho of North High although North High doesn't seem to get involved in a lot of fights. It is revealed that he bans students from fighting because he needs clean school records in order to participate in judo competition. He has a crush on cross-dressing Sakurada. He gets jealous of Kurosaki after coincidentally spotting her and cross-dressing Sakurada in a local festival together (even though he realizes that Kurosaki is a girl). Originally appeared in Hokusei-hen (北西編), another 4-koma segment in the manga, he is then promoted to the main story.

=== Hayasaka Family ===
Kōichi Hayasaka (早坂香一, Hayasaka Kōichi)
He is Kaori's estranged father. Their bad relationship rooted from Lydia's misunderstandings about Kōichi's family situation in the past, which had been resolved in recent chapters. In contrary to Public Morals Club members' speculation about his appearance and personality, Kōichi appears to be young-looking and easy-going. He is a caring father who is protective towards his son.
Lydia (リディア)
She is Kaori's deceased mother. She was an American. She dressed young Kaori in girls clothing as she believed in Japanese superstition that dressing a son in girls clothing would make him healthy. Lydia loved watching soap opera, which ironically reflected to her personality of being over-dramatic. Because of her misunderstandings about Kōichi's family situation, she distanced herself and Kaori from Kōichi for years. Despite that, she loved Kōichi so much that she named her son Kaori which originated from first kanji character of Kōichi's name.
Misaki (実咲) and Yurika (百合花)
Lydia thought they were Kōichi's biological children. The truth was that they are Kōichi's nieces, the daughters of his deceased sister. He adopted them after they were orphaned.

== Media ==
=== Manga ===
==== Volume list ====
No.	Original release date	Original ISBN	English release date	English ISBN
1	January 18, 2008	978-4592185314	March 1, 2011	978-1421538631
Chapter 1-5
2	May 19, 2008	978-4592185321	May 3, 2011	978-1421538648
Chapter 6-11
Saeki assigns Mafuyu and Hayasaka to the Public Morals Club. He reveals he has wagered five years' salary in order to double the enrollment at the school in three years. The club's first activity is to depose the bancho of the school, Kyotaro Okegawa. During the confrontation, Mafuyu realizes Hayasaka is no match for Okegawa so she postpones the fight, and then dresses up as a guy delinquent "Natsuo" to face him. She writes to her pen pal. When Okegawa gets suspended, Mafuyu takes him out to a movie where she discovers he has a sensitive side such as liking a nekomata character. When Hayasaka publicizes his search for Super Bun, Mafuyu considers telling him his identity, but Saeki discourages that as Hayasaka is the type of guy who cannot keep secrets. When Hayasaka discovers a Super Bun mask in her bag, Mafuyu scrambles to cover up the situation.
3	September 19, 2008	978-4592185338	July 5, 2011	978-1421538655
Chapter 12-17
4	February 19, 2009	978-4592185345	September 6, 2011	978-1421538662
Chapter 18-23
5	June 19, 2009	978-4592185352	November 1, 2011	978-1421538679
Chapter 24-28
6	October 19, 2009	978-4592185369	January 3, 2012	978-1421538686
Chapter 29-34
7	March 19, 2010	978-4592185376	March 6, 2012	978-1421540535
Chapter 35-39
8	July 16, 2010	978-4592185383	May 1, 2012	978-1421540962
Chapter 40-45
9	November 19, 2010	978-4592185390	July 3, 2012	978-1421541334
Chapter 46-51
10	March 18, 2011	978-4592185406	September 4, 2012	978-1421541341
Chapter 52-57
11	July 20, 2011	978-4592192664	November 6, 2012	978-1421542324
Chapter 58-63
12	November 18, 2011	978-4592192671	January 1, 2013	978-1421543352
Chapter 64-69
13	April 20, 2012	978-4592192688	March 5, 2013	978-1421550817
Chapter 70-75
14	August 20, 2012	978-4592192695	July 2, 2013	978-1421553771
Chapter 76-81
15	December 20, 2012	978-4592192701	November 5, 2013	978-1421559056
Chapter 82-87
16	May 20, 2013	978-4592194866	March 4, 2014	978-1421564326
Chapter 88-93
17	October 18, 2013	978-4592194873	October 7, 2014	978-1421572437
Chapter 94-98.5
18	April 18, 2014	978-4592194880	March 3, 2015	978-1421577739
Chapter 99-104
19	October 20, 2014	978-4592194897	November 3, 2015	978-1421581279
Chapter 105-110
20	April 20, 2015	978-4592215301	May 3, 2016	978-1421585239
Chapter 111-116
21	November 20, 2015	978-4592215318	November 1, 2016	978-1421590486
Chapter 117-122
22	June 20, 2016	978-4592215325	July 4, 2017	978-1421593456
Chapter 123-128
23	January 20, 2017	978-4592215332	February 6, 2018	978-1421597744
Chapter 129-134
24	July 20, 2017	978-4592215349	May 1, 2018	978-1974700486
Chapter 135-140
25	March 20, 2018	978-4592215356	February 5, 2019	978-1974704019
Chapter 141-146
26	October 19, 2018	978-4592215363	July 2, 2019	978-1974708376
Chapter 147-152
27	June 20, 2019	978-4592215370	August 4, 2020	978-1974712625
Chapter 153-158
28	April 20, 2020	978-4592215387	March 2, 2021	978-1974720071
Chapter 159-164
29	August 20, 2020	978-4592215394	July 6, 2021	978-1974722266
Chapter 165-170

=== Drama CD ===
There have been four drama CDs released by Marine Entertainment as of 2015.

First limited drama CD was released in February 2009, bundled with third issue of Hana to Yume. It covers the story from chapter 1, 4, 5, 9, and 22 of the manga.

A second drama CD was released in September 2012, along with the 19th issue of Hana to Yume titled Midorigaoka Academy Presents (緑ヶ丘高校プレゼンツ, Midorigaoka Kōkō Purezentsu). It contains two tracks, the first track was from an original scenario written by Izumi Tsubaki about a meeting hosted by Yui while the second track covers the story from chapter 59 about Kurosaki, Kangawa, and Maizono eating nabe.

Third drama CD titled Mafuyu's Hometown Visit, Returns! (真冬の里帰りリターンズ!, Mafuyu no Satogaeri Ritānzu!) was released in February 2013 as an extra to Hana to Yume fifth issue. It adapts chapter 79, 80, and 39 of the manga.

Fourth drama CD titled Eventhough It's Winter, A Summer Story Special (冬だけど夏のお話スペシャル, Fuyu Dakedo Natsu no Ohanashi Supesharu) was released in November 2015, bundled with 24th issue of Hana to Yume. Consisting of three tracks, the CD adapts chapter 98, 98.5, and author's original scenario as sequel to the second drama CD about Public Morals Club meeting.

In celebration of the manga's tenth anniversary, a double-release of drama CDs was announced for July 2017. Side A of the CD was released together with the manga's 24th tankōbon volume while Side B was bound with Hana to Yume 2017 16th issue. It featured three more new voice casts to portray Hanabusa, Yukioka, and Kawauchi.
