= The Magic Touch (manga) =

Japanese manga series

親指からロマンス (Oyayubi kara Romance)
- Genre: Comedy, romance
- Manga
- Written by: Izumi Tsubaki
- Published by: Hakusensha
- English publisher: NA: Viz Media (Shojo Beat)
- Magazine: Hana to Yume
- Original run: 2004 – 2007
- Volumes: 9

The Magic Touch (親指からロマンス, Oyayubi kara Romance) is a Japanese shōjo manga written and illustrated by Izumi Tsubaki. It was serialised in Hana to Yume magazine and collected into nine bound volume by Hakusensha between 2004 and 2007. It is licensed in North America by Viz Media, which released the first volume of the manga on February 3, 2009, and the final volume on August 3, 2010. It is licensed in French by Akata, which is releasing the manga as Sweet Relax.

== Plot ==
Chiaki Togu is a shy first year high school student who is the star of her high school's Massage Research Society club. She falls in love at the sight of the back of Yosuke, who is considered the most attractive boy at her school. Although Yosuke seems out of Chiaki's league, she would do anything to give him a massage. The two eventually strike up a deal in which she will be allowed to touch his back if she can make him fall in love with her.

== Media ==
=== Manga ===
No.	Original release date	Original ISBN	English release date	English ISBN
1	January 19, 2004	4592178092	February 3, 2009	9781421516714
2	May 19, 2004	4592173236	June 2, 2009	9781421516721
3	September 17, 2004	4592173244	August 4, 2009	9781421516738
4	April 19, 2005	459217268X	October 6, 2009	978-1421521657
5	December 16, 2005	4592172698	December 1, 2009	978-1421521664
6	May 19, 2006	4592172701	February 2, 2010	978-1421521671
7	November 17, 2006	459218257X	April 6, 2010	978-1421521688
8	March 19, 2007	9784592182580	June 1, 2010	978-1421521695
9	May 18, 2007	9784592182597	August 3, 2010	978-1421521701

== Reception ==
Casey Brienza, writing for Anime News Network, described the manga as "the single worst concept and the single worst execution of a shōjo manga serial that this reviewer can recall seeing since the start of her reviewing career". Melinda Beasi, reviewing the first volume, noted that the plot complications were resolved too easily. Jennifer Dunbar felt that the fourth volume was full of "shōjo stereotypes", and noted that it was unusual that the fifth volume's primary focus was on massage. Dunbar enjoyed the portrayal of the massage school. Katherine Dacey felt the story was "bland". Ysabet Reinhardt MacFarlane felt that Chiaki's evil twin sister was "cringe-worthy". Jason Thompson, writing for the appendix to Manga: The Complete Guide, felt the manga was extremely unrealistic, and "too dumb to even be a guilty pleasure".
