= 2011 in Japanese music =

The following is an overview of the year 2011 in Japanese music. It includes notable awards, lists of number-ones, yearly best-sellers, albums released, groups established and disestablished, deaths of notable Japanese music-related people as well as any other relevant Japanese music-related events. For overviews of the year in music from other countries, see 2011 in music.

== Events ==
- May 31 – July 18 – The First Japan Arena Tour (Girls' Generation)
- December 31 – 62nd NHK Kōhaku Uta Gassen

== Awards ==
- June 25 – 2011 MTV Video Music Aid Japan
- December 30 – 53rd Japan Record Awards

== Number-ones ==
- Oricon number-one albums
- Oricon number-one singles
- Hot 100 number-one singles
- RIAJ Digital Track Chart number-one singles

== Best-sellers ==
=== Artists ===
The following is a list of the 5 best-selling music artists in Japan in 2011 by value of sales, including sales of records and of DVDs and Blu-rays, according to Oricon.

Rank	Artist	Value
1	AKB48	¥16.282 billion
2	Arashi	¥15.369 billion
3	Exile	¥5.603 billion
4	Kara	¥4.926 billion
5	Shōjo Jidai	¥4.049 billion

=== Albums ===
The following is a list of the top 10 best-selling albums in Japan in 2011, according to Oricon.

Rank	Album	Artist	Copies
1	Beautiful World	Arashi	907,589
2	Koko ni Ita Koto	AKB48	829,645
3	Negai no Tō	Exile	743,242
4	Born This Way	Lady Gaga	658,554
5	Girls' Generation	Shōjo Jidai	642,054
6	Checkmate!	Namie Amuro	484,336
7	Super Girl	Kara	450,595
8	Musicman	Keisuke Kuwata	414,725
9	SMAP Aid	SMAP	413,943
10	Ikimonobakari: Members Best Selection	Ikimono-gakari	397,459

== Albums released ==
The following section includes albums by Japanese artists released in Japan in 2011 as well as Japanese-language albums by foreign artists released in the country during this year.

- January 19 – Eight by Do As Infinity
- January 26 – Go by Girugamesh
- February 9 – I Wanna Go to Hawaii. by Alexandros
- February 23 – Musicman by Keisuke Kuwata
- March 2 — Dejavu by Koda Kumi
- March 9 – Negai no Tō by Exile
- March 23 – Brand-new idol Society by BiS
- March 30 – 7 Berryz Times by Berryz Kobo
- April 27 – Checkmate! by Namie Amuro
- June 1 – Cherish by Seiko Matsuda
- June 1 – Girls' Generation by Girls' Generation
- June 8 – Echo by Nothing's Carved in Stone
- June 8 – Koko ni Ita Koto by AKB48
- July 6 – Beautiful World by Arashi
- July 20 – Luv Songs by Che'Nelle
- July 27 – C'mon by B'z
- August 3 – Dum Spiro Spero by Dir En Grey
- August 10 – Baby Action by Scandal
- August 17 – SMAP Aid by SMAP
- September 21 – After Eden by Kalafina
- September 28 - DocumentaLy by Sakanaction
- November 17 – Fight by Kanjani Eight
- November 23 – Super Girl by Kara
- November 30 – Republic of 2PM by 2PM
- December 7 – Memories by Garnet Crow

== Deaths ==
- Yoshiko Tanaka dies on April 21 from Breast Cancer.
- Joe Yamanaka dies on August 7.

== See also ==
- 2011 in Japan
- 2011 in Japanese television
- List of Japanese films of 2011
