= Karakuri Samurai Sesshaawan 1 =

- Genre: Tokusatsu
- Starring: Tomohisa Yuge; Rina Kirishima; Reina Fujie
- Country of origin: Japan
- Original language: Japanese
- No. of seasons: 1
- No. of episodes: 13

Original release
- Network: TV Shizuoka
- Release: July 3 – October 2, 2011

Karakuri Samurai Sesshaawan 1 (からくり侍 セッシャー1) is a 2011 Japanese tokusatsu television series.

== Cast ==
- Tomohisa Yuge
- Rina Kirishima
- Reina Fujie
