= Izumi Tsubaki =

Japanese manga artist

- Born: December 11 Saitama, Japan
- Area: Manga artist
- Notable works: Oresama Teacher, Monthly Girls' Nozaki-kun

Izumi Tsubaki (椿 いづみ, Tsubaki Izumi; born December 11) is a Japanese manga artist, best known for her long-running series Oresama Teacher and Monthly Girls' Nozaki-kun.

In an interview with Manga News in France, Tsubaki said that she was inspired by Yoshihiro Togashi and her sister who is also a manga artist. Yu Yu Hakusho was the first manga she bought on her own. She became a manga artist after placing third in a contest and was approached by an editor.

== Works ==
- Chijimete Distance (2002, Hana to Yume)
- The Magic Touch (2003–2007, Hana to Yume, 9 volumes)
- Oresama Teacher (2007–2020, Hana to Yume, 29 volumes)
- Monthly Girls' Nozaki-kun (2011–present, Gangan Online, 16 volumes)
