= Monthly Girls' Nozaki-kun =

Japanese manga and anime series

- Cover of the first volume featuring Umetarō Nozaki

月刊少女野崎くん (Gekkan Shōjo Nozaki-kun)
- Genre: Parody; Romantic comedy
- Manga
- Written by: Izumi Tsubaki
- Published by: Square Enix
- English publisher: NA: Yen Press
- Magazine: Gangan Online
- Original run: August 25, 2011 – present
- Volumes: 18
- Audio drama
- Produced by: Frontier Works
- Released: June 26, 2013
- Episodes: 1
- Anime television series
- Directed by: Mitsue Yamazaki
- Produced by: Gekkan Shōjo Nozaki-kun Production Committee
- Written by: Yoshiko Nakamura
- Music by: Yukari Hashimoto; Media Factory
- Studio: Doga Kobo
- Licensed by: AUS: Hanabee; NA: Sentai Filmworks; UK: MVM Films (former); Anime Limited (current)
- Original network: TV Tokyo, TVO, TVA, TSC, TVh, TVQ, AT-X
- Original run: July 7, 2014 – September 22, 2014
- Episodes: 12
- Original video animation
- Directed by: Mitsue Yamazaki
- Studio: Doga Kobo
- Licensed by: AUS: Hanabee; NA: Sentai Filmworks; UK: MVM Films (former); Anime Limited (current)
- Released: September 24, 2014 – February 25, 2015
- Runtime: 3 minutes (per episode)
- Episodes: 6
- Television drama

The Comic Bang
- Directed by: Zhong Qing
- Written by: Yu Jin; Huo Beibei; He Siyu
- Studio: Shanghai Canxing Film and Culture
- Original network: iQIYI; Rakuten Viki; Tencent Video
- English network: iQIYI; Rakuten Viki
- Original run: May 22, 2025 – July 2, 2025
- Episodes: 33
- icon

Monthly Girls' Nozaki-kun (Japanese: 月刊少女野崎くん, Hepburn: Gekkan Shōjo Nozaki-kun) (Note: The title is a play on common manga magazine titles, which follow the format of "[Publication Frequency] [Demographic] [Name]".) is a Japanese four-panel manga series written and illustrated by Izumi Tsubaki. The chapters are serialized online in Gangan Online and have been published in tankōbon volumes by Square Enix. An anime adaptation produced by Doga Kobo aired from July to September 2014.

A Chinese drama adaptation titled The Comic Bang streamed on iQIYI from May to July 2025.

== Plot ==
High school student Chiyo Sakura has a crush on schoolmate Umetarou Nozaki. When she confesses her love to him, he mistakes her for a fan and gives her an autograph. When she says she wants to be with him, he invites her to his house and has her help on some drawings. Sakura discovers that Nozaki is actually a renowned shōjo manga artist working under the pen name Sakiko Yumeno. She agrees to be his assistant in order to get closer to him. As they work on his manga Let's Fall in Love (恋しよっ, Koi Shiyo; a.k.a. Let's Have a Romance), they encounter other schoolmates, who assist them and serve as inspirations for the story.

== Characters ==
The major characters of the series. From left to right: Wakamatsu, Seo, Sakura, Nozaki, Mikoshiba, Kashima and Hori.

=== Main characters ===
Chiyo Sakura (佐倉 千代, Sakura Chiyo)
Voiced by: Ari Ozawa (Japanese); Juliet Simmons (English)
A cheerful high school girl with a crush on Nozaki. When she confesses to him by saying she's a fan, she gets Nozaki's autograph and, through further misunderstandings, becomes his inker assistant instead. She is a member of the school's art club, and is skilled at drawing still life and using watercolors. She is petite and notably wears two large hair ribbons with a polka dot pattern. Sakura first met Nozaki at their school entrance ceremony. Her hairstyle and ribbons back then were used subconsciously by Nozaki when designing his manga's heroine Mamiko.^{[ch. 50]} Due to her intense enthusiasm about Nozaki, almost all of her peers are aware of her crush. She is in class 2-A and shares a class with Seo. She has a younger brother named Towa.^{[ch. 84.5]}
Umetarou Nozaki (野崎 梅太郎, Nozaki Umetarō)
Voiced by: Yuichi Nakamura (Japanese); Ty Mahany (English)
A tall, stoic high school student and the object of Sakura's affection. Using the pen name Sakiko Yumeno (夢野咲子, Yumeno Sakiko), he is secretly the creator of the shōjo manga Let's Fall in Love published in the magazine Monthly Girls' Romance (月刊少女ロマンス, Gekkan Shōjo Romansu). Despite making a romance manga, he has no personal experience in love and seems unromantic in real life.^{[ch. 1,2]} He appreciates Sakura's friendship and drawing ability but is oblivious to her feelings. He lives on his own, having convinced his father that he can cover expenses with his manga royalties.^{[ch. 33]} In middle school, he was captain of the school basketball team but stopped playing to focus on making manga.^{[ch. 11]} He is in class 2-B. He has two younger siblings, Mayu and Yumeko.
Mikoto Mikoshiba (御子柴 実琴, Mikoshiba Mikoto)
Voiced by: Nobuhiko Okamoto (Japanese); Scott Gibbs (English)
Mikoshiba, nicknamed Mikorin (みこりん), is one of Nozaki's assistants. Despite being popular and flirtatious with girls, he is shy and becomes embarrassed shortly after making bold statements. Sakura learns that he is the inspiration for Nozaki's heroine character Mamiko, unbeknownst to Mikoshiba. He assists Nozaki in filling backgrounds with flowers and other embellishments to bring out the charms.^{[ch. 3]} He is in class 2-G and shares a class with Kashima. His hobbies include collecting bishōjo figurines^{[ch. 11,19]} and playing dating simulation games^{[ch. 8]}, though he tries to hide his otaku interests from others. Mikoshiba admires a blog which features suggestive art by Nozaki's brother Mayu, under the assumption that it is run by a girl.
Yuzuki Seo (瀬尾 結月, Seo Yuzuki)
Voiced by: Miyuki Sawashiro (Japanese); Joanne Bonasso (English)
Sakura's athletic friend and classmate. Often unintentionally, Seo offends her peers with her brash personality. Nozaki classifies her as "KY" (空気を読まない, Kūki o yomanai; oblivious, thick-skinned): she cannot read the mood of a situation. She also has zero sportsmanship; the boys' basketball team has her practice with them so they can learn how to deal with difficult players. Despite her rude and tomboyish demeanor, she has an angelic singing voice and is nicknamed the "Choir Club's Lorelai" (声楽部のローレライ, Seigaku-bu no Rorerai; anime: "Lorelei").^{[ch. 4]} She enjoys pestering Wakamatsu, whom she calls "Waka", due to her developing a crush on him.^{[ch. 14]} Inspired by their relationship, Nozaki makes a male character based on her named Oze.^{[ch. 13]} Her older brother is Ryōsuke.
Yuu Kashima (鹿島 遊, Kashima Yū)
Voiced by: Mai Nakahara (Japanese); Monica Rial (English)
Mikoshiba's best friend and classmate. She is extroverted, tall, and androgynous. In their first year, Mikoshiba and Kashima considered each other rivals but Kashima beat Mikoshiba in all aspects, eventually leading to their friendship.^{[ch. 5]} Nearly every single girl in the school is infatuated with Kashima due to "his" princely demeanor and complete confidence compared to Mikoshiba. Although she enjoys reveling in the attention she gets from girls, Kashima is instead openly in love with Hori and wants him to consider her his favourite "cute kōhai".^{[ch. 10]} She is the star member of the school drama club and acts in every lead male role, usually that of a prince. However, she often skips club activities and creates bizarre ideas or comments regarding Hori, making her the target of his anger. Furthermore, Kashima is tone deaf and thus is never cast in musicals, so she has Seo be her singing coach.^{[ch. 25]} She has a younger sister named Rei.^{[ch. 99]}
Masayuki Hori (堀 政行, Hori Masayuki)
Voiced by: Yūki Ono (Japanese); Adam Noble (English)
President of the school drama club and Nozaki's assistant for background work, in exchange for Nozaki writing scripts for the drama club. Despite having incredible acting talent, Hori is self-conscious of his short height and prefers to work on directing plays and building sets instead. He has a short temper, triggered mostly by Kashima, and reacts violently towards her whenever she does anything inappropriate.^{[ch. 6]} Despite this, he still dotes on Kashima like a parent for her handsome appearance and acting ability.^{[ch. 20]} He is in class 3-C.^{[ch. 6]}
Hirotaka Wakamatsu (若松 博隆, Wakamatsu Hirotaka)
Voiced by: Ryōhei Kimura (Japanese); Cameron Bautsch (English)
Nozaki's junior from the basketball team in middle school.^{[ch. 15]} He joins Nozaki's staff to do screentones. He can be too forgiving and naive, making him the main target of Seo's harassment. Due to stress caused by Seo during and outside of basketball practice, he suffers from insomnia. Ironically, Wakamatsu immediately falls asleep whenever he hears Lorelai sing. He develops an infatuation with Lorelai, unaware of her true identity as Seo. Inspired by their relationship, Nozaki makes a female character based on him named Waka. He is in class 1-D.^{[ch. 15]}

=== Supporting characters ===
Ken Miyamae (宮前 剣, Miyamae Ken)
Voiced by: Kenta Miyake (Japanese); Luis Galindo (English)
Nozaki's current editor. Although Ken appears as a grumpy overweight man, Nozaki admires him because he is competent in comparison to his previous editor.^{[ch. 7]} Ken is 28 years old (27 in the anime)^{[ep 11]}, and although he is the same age as Maeno, he had to retake college entrance exams and ended up being two years behind Maeno.^{[ch. 22]} It is revealed that his body became overweight due to stress caused by Maeno.
Mitsuya Maeno (前野 蜜也, Maeno Mitsuya)
Voiced by: Daisuke Ono (Japanese); Ned Gayle (English)
Nozaki's former editor, Maeno is currently in charge of Miyako Yukari. He is a narcissist who is fond of cute characters such as tanukis.^{[ch. 7,9]} He and Miyamae have known each other since high school. He regularly posts on the Monthly Girls' Romance editor's blog. He is careless in his actions; for example, he casually loses Yukari's manuscript and spills curry on another one.^{[ch. 9]}
Yukari Miyako (都 ゆかり, Miyako Yukari)
Voiced by: Ayako Kawasumi (Japanese); Brittany Djie (English)
Nozaki's upstairs neighbour. Miyako is a college student who is also a shōjo manga artist going by her real name. Her manga works feature a tanuki, mainly because her editor Maeno suggests it, and she has trouble standing up for herself.^{[ch. 9]} She keeps her identity as a manga artist a secret from her schoolmates, who are regularly concerned about her unknown job and relationships.^{[ch. 26,53]}
Mayu Nozaki (野崎 真由, Nozaki Mayu)
Nozaki's overly lazy younger brother. Because he was bullied when he was young, he rarely talks. He sometimes writes abbreviated phrases on what he wants to say, but will talk if it is quicker.^{[ch. 33,37]} The rare time when he puts in effort is when he captains his school's judo club. In order to teach his club members floor grappling techniques, he learned to draw cute girls in various positions and holds referencing Mikoshiba's otaku collection under the penname MayuMayu. He is unknowingly in email communication with Mikoshiba.^{[ch. 43]} In an earlier draft, Mayu was drawn as a girl but the idea was scrapped due to reasons like her incompatibility with other male characters.
Ryōsuke Seo (瀬尾 遼介, Seo Ryōsuke)
Seo's older brother is a college student who has a crush on Miyako, his classmate. Ryosuke works part-time in a cafe. His efforts to be closer to Miyako usually fail, and he once ends up mistaking Nozaki as her boyfriend.^{[ch. 53]} He knows that his younger sister is attracted to Wakamatsu, and assumes the love is mutual when Wakamatsu states he is in love with Lorelei.^{[ch. 74]}
Yumeko Nozaki (野崎 夢子, Nozaki Yumeko)
The younger sister to the Nozaki brothers. She is bad at drawing, and is the only one in her family who refuses to believe her oldest brother is a manga artist. She loves the character Suzuki and her ideal guy is a transfer student.^{[ch. 72.5]} Yumeko was originally drafted as the main character of the series, with her brother Umetarō as a support character. This idea was scrapped and her and Umetarō's roles were reversed.
Towa Sakura (佐倉 十和, Sakura Towa)
Sakura's younger brother, Towa is a second year in junior high. He is a member of the tennis club. Sakura often annoys him with biased love talk about Nozaki. As a result, Towa's first impression of Nozaki is that he is a popular model.^{[ch. 84.5]}
Rei Kashima (鹿島 麗, Kashima Rei)
Kashima's younger sister, a sheltered girl who is a big fan of Yumeno Sakiko's works. Having only ever attended all-girls schools, she is very interested in notions of romance, her imagination easily spinning out of control.

=== Let's Fall in Love characters ===
Mamiko (マミコ)
Voiced by: Marie Miyake (Japanese); Melissa Molano (English)
Heroine of Nozaki's manga. Much of the manga surrounds Mamiko and her various attempts to win over Suzuki's affections. Her personality is modeled after Mikoshiba,^{[ch. 3]} while her appearance is based on Nozaki's first meeting with Sakura, when she gave one of her white-coloured ribbons to him and walked away with the other one in her hair.^{[ch. 48]} In the anime, Sakura wears a single white-coloured ribbon, styled just like Mamiko's.
Saburo Suzuki (鈴木 三郎, Suzuki Saburō)
Voiced by: Mamoru Miyano (Japanese); Chris Patton (English)
Hero of Nozaki's manga. He is Mamiko's love interest. Suzuki's appearance is Nozaki's easiest and favourite face to draw. As a result, Suzuki and his friend and rival initially all looked the same, so Nozaki had Sakura scout for other character designs.^{[ch. 4]}
Oze (尾瀬)
A male supporting character of Nozaki's manga, whose personality is modeled after Seo. The character has shown to be quite popular within the readership of Nozaki's manga.
Waka (和歌)
A female supporting character of Nozaki's manga, whose personality is modeled after Wakamatsu.

== Media ==
=== Manga ===
Izumi Tsubaki began serializing the manga in Square Enix's online magazine Gangan Online on August 25, 2011. As of August 2026, the series has been collected into eighteen tankōbon volumes. Apart from the comics, an official fanbook and an anthology manga (containing stories by Satsuki Yoshino (Barakamon), Yasunobu Yamauchi (Daily Lives of High School Boys), Tachibana Higuchi (Gakuen Alice), Shigeru Takao, and Dan Ichikawa) have also been published, both on August 22, 2014. North American publisher Yen Press announced that they had licensed the series at Sakura-Con in April 2015. Individual chapters are called "issues".

==== Volumes ====
No.	Original release date	Original ISBN	English release date	English ISBN
1	April 20, 2012	978-4-7575-3566-4	November 17, 2015	978-0-316-30947-9
This volume collects issues 1-10.
High school girl Chiyo Sakura confesses to her crush Umetarou Nozaki by telling him she's a fan, but gets his autograph. She asks to be with him, which he accepts, but she becomes an inker for Nozaki's manga. It turns out he is a popular shojo manga artist named Sakiko Yumeno. Sakura and Nozaki discuss how to portray delinquents. When a scenario comes up where the main manga couple wants to share a bicycle ride home, Nozaki ponders how to do it without breaking the law, and to realize the scene, he invites Sakura to ride with him on a tandem bicycle. Nozaki introduces Sakura to his friend Mikoto Mikoshiba, nicknamed "Mikorin", who does background floral illustrations. Mikorin appears to be a popular and flirtatious ladies' man, but is actually painfully shy and easily embarrassed. Nozaki wants to introduce a new character to his manga, so Sakura introduces him to her friend Yuzuki Seo, an outgoing girl with a loud personality but is rather insensitive and cannot read the room. Mikorin introduces Sakura and Nozaki to his friend, Yuu Kashima, a tall girl who acts more like a charismatic school prince in attracting a number of girls. Kashima acts goofy around her upperclassman Masayuki Hori, who is president of the Drama Club and who later turns out be Nozaki's assistant on backgrounds. Nozaki's editor Ken Miyamae visits. Mikorin stays over at Nozaki's place to play a dating sim game. Sakura meets Yukari Miyako, Nozaki's neighbor who is also a manga artist. She also meets Mitsuya Maeno, Nozaki's narcissistic yet clueless former editor. As Hori works with Nozaki on some new stories, Kashima shares with Sakura about Hori's background. Sakura and Hori role-play some parts that Nozaki wrote up; Mikorin joins in on the fun.
2	November 22, 2012	978-4-7575-3777-4	February 23, 2016	978-0-316-39157-3
This volume collects issues 11-20.
When Nozaki finishes his manuscript early, he and Sakura go shopping. Nozaki talks with Sakura about Maeno and then meets up with Miyamae. Wakamatsu continues to look for Lorelai, shares his basketball woes with Nozaki, and then drops by his place only to fall asleep to Lorelai's singing. Wakamatsu borrows Nozaki's manga as reference material for confronting Seo. Miyamae asks Nozaki to identify with being Mamiko for the day. Kashima is bothered that Hori has been cold to her, while Hori finds Kashima annoying as usual, until he throws his bookbag at her and she finds Nozaki's manga and asks some of the guys about it. When Nozaki and Sakura forget their umbrellas, they discuss the sharing umbrella trope. Nozaki's neighbor Miyako struggles with having lots of tanukis in her manga. Mikorin poses for Sakura's art club. When Nozaki is sick with a cold, Sakura, Hori, and Wakamatsu show up to help work on his manga's screentones and backgrounds.
3	June 22, 2013	978-4-7575-3985-3	May 24, 2016	978-0-316-39158-0
This volume collects issues 21-30.
Mikoshiba practices for a group date with Nozaki and Sakura. Miyamae and Maeno attend their high school class reunion. Needing to do a story about his side characters, Nozaki sends Wakamatsu and Seo on a movie date. Hori and Sakura comment about how Nozaki has no clue how to do backgrounds and proper people/object placement. Nozaki ponders how to give Suzuki a character weakness; Hori gets inspired to produce a musical, but Kashima worries because she is tone deaf so she asks for Seo's help. When Miyako's university classmates speculate about her supposed boyfriend; one of them overhears her talking with the boyfriend (Nozaki) and Sakura. Nozaki and Mikoshiba act like bad boys. Sakura finds some Valentine's Day chocolates she did not give to Nozaki; and the gang talk about their experiences. While Wakamatsu and Nozaki discuss screentones, Wakamatsu wants to get a new blade, but his basketball team refuses, thinking he might be threatening Seo. Hori participates as an actor for some scenes, and the gang bring in Mikoshiba to play opposite him.
4	January 22, 2014	978-4-7575-4203-7	August 30, 2016	978-0-316-39160-3
This volume collects issues 31-40.
Nozaki ponders how to put a thrilling climax into his manga story, and tries some surprise scenarios on Sakura. Miyamae loans Nozaki an otome game; Nozaki, Wakamatsu, and Hori play it together. Nozaki's brother Mayu visits, and Sakura learns of Nozaki's back story of his telling his parents he wants to live on his own. Wakamatsu shares that he might be in love with Lorelai. Nozaki tries to meet Sakura and Mikoshiba at the train station while trying not to use their cellphones. Nozaki, Sakura, and Wakamatsu try to help Hori do backgrounds. Mikoshiba and Mayu hang out at Miyako's place. The guys stay over at Nozaki's because of a rainstorm but don't want to reveal to each other that they are helping out on his manga. Following a restructuring, Miyamae gets some new artists and is reminded of the time he took over for managing Nozaki. The gang attend a summer festival.
5	July 22, 2014	978-4-7575-4353-9	November 22, 2016	978-0-316-39161-0
This volume collects issues 41-50.
Sakura realizes she has not made any progress with Nozaki; her friends suggest she act like a little tease, so she acts like Seo. Kashima has a cold, so she gets Mikorin and friends to read out her thoughts that she has written on a sketch pad. While helping Miyako with some background characters, Nozaki ponders some artist copying techniques. His brother Mayu wants to create some manga-style visual posters for his judo club. While they take the train, Wakamatsu tells Mikorin that he is in love with Lorelai, when Seo arrives and Mikorin discovers from Sakura that Seo is Lorelai. Nozaki ponders an animal mascot for his manga, and goes to the art club to experiment with clay while Sakura's club-mates observe how the two interact. Hori is having a Drama Club overnight trip, and the whole gang joins in. As the girls shop for swimsuits, Wakamatsu gets more concerned about Kashima's relationship with Seo. The gang has fun at the beach, even when Seo causes the guys to lose their swim trunks in the water. Afterwards, they have a hot springs soak and hang out in each other's rooms. Miyako and Nozaki discuss magazine cover art layouts while their editor counterparts go out drinking. Sakura recalls the time when she and Nozaki first met.
6	February 21, 2015	978-4-7575-4378-2 (regular edition); 978-4-7575-4379-9 (limited edition)	February 21, 2017	978-0-316-39162-7
This volume collects issues 51-60.
7	December 22, 2015	978-4-7575-4830-5	May 23, 2017	978-0-316-50271-9
This volume collects issues 61-70.
8	August 22, 2016	978-4-7575-4870-1 (regular edition); 978-4-7575-4871-8 (limited edition)	July 18, 2017	978-0-316-43999-2
This volume collects issues 71-79 and includes an extra issue titled "The Nozaki Family".
9	August 22, 2017	978-4-7575-5442-9	April 24, 2018	978-1-9753-0009-8
This volume collects issues 80-88 and includes an extra issue titled "My Sister's Idol".
10	August 21, 2018	978-4-7575-5782-6	January 22, 2019	978-1-9753-8364-0
This volume collects issues 89-98.
11	August 22, 2019	978-4-7575-6150-2 (regular edition); 978-4-7575-6151-9 (limited edition)	March 10, 2020	978-1-9753-0792-9
This volume collects issues 99-108.
12	August 11, 2020	978-4-7575-6797-9	June 1, 2021	978-1-9753-2336-3
This volume collects issues 109-118.
13	August 11, 2021	978-4-7575-7395-6 (regular edition); 978-4-7575-7396-3 (limited edition)	July 12, 2022	978-1-9753-4723-9
This volume collects issues 119-128.
14	August 10, 2022	978-4-7575-8078-7	September 19, 2023	978-1-9753-6481-6
This volume covers chapters 129-138.
15	August 10, 2023	978-4-7575-8428-0 (regular edition); 978-4-7575-8726-7 (limited edition)	September 17, 2024	979-8-8554-0227-8
This volume collects issues 139-148 and includes an extra issue titled "Happy Summer Days".
16	August 9, 2024	978-4-7575-9352-7	July 22, 2025	979-8-8554-1599-5
This volume collects chapters 149-158.
17	August 8, 2025	978-4-301-00010-5	August 25, 2026	979-8-8554-3606-8
This volume collects chapters 159-168.
18	August 10, 2026	978-4-301-00547-6 (regular edition); 978-4-301-00548-3 (limited edition)	—	—

=== Drama CD ===
Frontier Works released a drama CD on June 26, 2013, featuring the casts below which differ from the later produced anime. It reached at 32nd on Oricon's CD Album rankings.

- Chiyo Sakura: Asuka Nishi
- Umetarō Nozaki: Hiroki Yasumoto
- Mikoto Mikoshiba: KENN
- Yuzuki Seo: Miyuki Sawashiro
- Yū Kashima: Chie Matsuura
- Masayuki Hori: Junji Majima
- Hirotaka Wakamatsu: Daisuke Namikawa
- Mamiko: Yukari Tamura
- Saburō Suzuki: Daisuke Namikawa
- Tomoda: Takahiro Mizushima

=== Anime ===
Media Factory announced an anime adaptation on March 21, 2014, and the anime's official website posted several videos, revealing key cast and staff members, which differ from the drama CD. The anime is produced by Doga Kobo and directed by Mitsue Yamazaki, who had worked on Hakkenden: Eight Dogs of the East and Durarara!!. Series composition is handled by Yoshiko Nakamura. Junichirō Taniguchi, who did the second season of Genshiken and the Puella Magi Madoka Magica film, is in charge of character design. It premiered on July 7, 2014, on TV Tokyo, followed by TV Osaka, TV Aichi, TSC, TV Hokkaido, TVQ, AT-X over the rest of the week. The opening theme, titled "Kimi Janakya Dame Mitai" (君じゃなきゃダメみたい, lit. 'Seems It Can't Be Anyone Other Than You') is composed and performed by Masayoshi Ōishi, and the ending theme "Uraomote Fortune" (ウラオモテ・フォーチュン) is performed by Ari Ozawa under her character name, Chiyo Sakura.

After the announcement, a campaign was launched around the fictional manga magazine Monthly Girls' Romance (月刊少女ロマンス, Gekkan Shōjo Romansu) Nozaki publishes his series in. First, the author Izumi Tsubaki tweeted on April Fools' that an issue of the magazine had been released. Later in June, an actual manga tankōbon, made to look like the magazine and containing bonus content and sample chapters, was printed and distributed in limited numbers. In August, a website for the magazine was launched and the special manga reprinted and distributed nationwide in September. After the anime finished airing, the website was removed.

On July 25, 2014, Sentai Filmworks announced it has licensed the series for home video release. Media Factory released it on Blu-ray and DVD formats in Japan starting on September 24, 2014, across six volumes. Mini-OVA specials were bundled with each Blu-ray/DVD volume.

The series began streaming on Netflix on May 1, 2020, including dubs in English, Spanish and Portuguese.

==== Episodes ====
All episodes were written by Yoshiko Nakamura.

No.	Title	Storyboarder	Directed by	Animation supervisor(s)	Original release date
1	"This Love is Being Turned Into a Shojo Manga"; Transliteration: "Sono Koi wa, Shōjo Mangaka Sarete yuku" (Japanese: その恋は、少女漫画化されてゆく。)	Mitsue Yamazaki	Mitsue Yamazaki	Miki Takihara	July 7, 2014
Chiyo Sakura confesses to her crush Umetaro Nozaki by saying she is his fan, but he responds by giving her his autograph. She then says she wants to be with him, so Nozaki invites her to his apartment and makes her do "beta work". After several hours, she realizes Nozaki is the shōjo manga artist Sakiko Yumeno, who is published in the popular magazine Monthly Girls' Romance. Together they attempt to think of romantic scenarios for his work, such as taking a girl home on a bicycle. But because two people riding a bicycle is against the law, Nozaki and Sakura ride a tandem bicycle instead for inspiration. Finding none, Nozaki writes a scenario where his main characters Suzuki and Mamiko walk home. Sakura tries to confess her love again but gets another autograph.
2	"Say Hello to the New Heroine"; Transliteration: "Nyū Hiroin o Yoroshiku ne" (Japanese: 新(ニュー)ヒロインをよろしくね♪)	Tetsuto Saitō	Odahiro Watanabe	Chieko Miyakawa	July 14, 2014
Nozaki introduces Sakura to his friend and assistant Mikoto Mikoshiba, a popular and flirtatious guy who Sakura soon learns is painfully shy and easily embarrassed. He spends a session at Nozaki's place pretending to be aloof, but in reality is waiting for Sakura to ask for his help. Sakura learns that Mikoshiba's artistic specialty is adding background decorations such as flowers. She also discovers Mikoshiba is Nozaki's secret model for the heroine of his manga, Mamiko. Later, Nozaki asks Sakura if she has any friends who might fit in a shōjo manga. She introduces him to Yuzuki Seo, an athletic girl who has the habit of being obliviously insensitive to others. However, secretly she has an angelic singing voice, earning her the nickname the "Choir Club's Lorelei".
3	"Violence vs. the Prince"; Transliteration: "Baiorensu bāsasu Purinsu" (Japanese: バイオレンスVSプリンス)	Ryōhei Takeshita	Ryōhei Takeshita	Yuka Kudō	July 21, 2014
Mikoshiba introduces Sakura and Nozaki to his best friend Yū Kashima, known as the prince of the school. Kashima turns out to be a girl with an androgynous appearance and is incredibly popular among other girls. Her carefree attitude towards her drama club irritates the club's president Masayuki Hori, who often scolds and physically beats her. After helping Hori paint some sets, Sakura discovers that he is the one who does backgrounds for Nozaki's manga, in exchange for screenplays. However, Nozaki has trouble creating a new script after meeting Kashima in person. He has Hori and Sakura role-play his script, during which Mikoshiba also gets involved. Inspired by their acting, Nozaki finally writes a decent script but realizes he based the female lead off of Mikoshiba again.
4	"There are Times When Men Must Fight"; Transliteration: "Otoko ni wa, Tatakawaneba Naranai, Toki ga Aru." (Japanese: 男には、戦わねばならない、時がある。)	Hiroaki Yoshikawa	Tatsuya Nokimori	Chisato Kikunaga	July 28, 2014
Mikoshiba asks Nozaki if he can stay the night for advice regarding girls in his dating simulation game. Mikoshiba initially played dating simulations to learn to talk to real girls, but he developed a love for 2D girls instead. As they play through the game, they realize that the protagonist's best friend Tomoda supported the protagonist every step of the way. Touched by Tomoda's selfless love, Nozaki and Mikoshiba make a comic about the two characters, later discovered by Sakura, in a Boy's Love story. Later, Mikoshiba is invited to attend a mixer, but he is too shy to know what to do there. Nozaki and Sakura unsuccessfully practice with him, since they also have no experience with mixers. In the end, Kashima takes Mikoshiba's place at the event and succeeds as the only one to attract girls.
5	"The Man Who Envisions Love"; Transliteration: "Koi o Omoi Egaku Danshi." (Japanese: 恋を「思い」「描く」男子。)	Osamu Yamazaki	Geisei Morita	Manamu Amazaki	August 4, 2014
Nozaki cleans his apartment for his editor Ken Miyamae, who appears so distant that Sakura thinks he and Ken's friendship is one-sided. However, Nozaki praises him in comparison to his previous editor Mitsuya Maeno. Sakura meets Nozaki's neighbour and manga artist Yukari Miyako, whose current editor is Maeno. Sakura learns of his narcissism and incompetence as an editor, such as pressuring Miyako to add tanukis in her manga and physically losing Miyako's manuscript. After reviewing a draft, Ken criticizes Nozaki's heroine for her lack of complicated feelings. Nozaki pretends to be Mamiko for a day in order to understand her character. Realizing Mamiko spends too much time thinking about love, Nozaki concludes to Ken that Mamiko should study for school more.
6	"I'll Cast a Spell on You"; Transliteration: "Mahō o Kakete Ageru" (Japanese: 魔法をかけて、あ・げ・る♡)	Tetsuto Saitō	Mitsue Yamazaki	Atsuko Nakajima	August 11, 2014
Nozaki runs into Hirotaka Wakamatsu, his junior from their middle school basketball team. Wakamatsu tells Nozaki how Seo harasses him, making him unable to sleep. Ironically, when Wakamatsu hears a song by Lorelei at Nozaki's house, he immediately falls asleep. Nozaki creates two side characters based on Seo and Wakamatsu's relationship named Oze and Waka. Wakamatsu uses shōjo manga as reference to express his anger at Seo, but she interprets his actions as a love confession. Later on, Nozaki gets a fever and sends the text message "SOS" to Hori, Sakura and Wakamatsu. The three team up to help Nozaki with his manga and discover Wakamatsu is skilled at applying screentones. However, without Nozaki's direction, they add mismatched screentones to every page.
7	"The Manga Artist's Brain, Nozaki-kun"; Transliteration: "Mangaka Nō Nozaki-kun" (Japanese: 漫画家脳野崎くん)	Odahiro Watanabe	Odahiro Watanabe	Miki Takihara, Yuka Kudō, Kanako Yoshida	August 18, 2014
Sakura takes Nozaki to the mall on his day off so he can take a break from his manga. However, they spend the time watching a movie for background references, shopping for a sailor uniform, and browsing a figurine store for poses. There they encounter Mikoshiba looking at bishōjo figurines who, embarrassed, kicks them out. Nozaki invites Sakura to his house afterwards, hoping she can wear his newly bought sailor uniform for photo references. Later, Mikoshiba volunteers to model for the art club. Though he feels reluctant at first, Sakura and the art club help him feel comfortable by directing his poses. Mikoshiba becomes too comfortable and careless with his words that, when asked if he would model again, he promises to do it nude.
8	"The Prince (Girl) of the School's Problems"; Transliteration: "Gakuen no Ōji-sama (Joshi) no Nayami" (Japanese: 学園の王子様(女子)の悩み)	Ryōhei Takeshita	Ryōhei Takeshita	Kyōko Kotani, Satonobu Kikuchi, Manamu Amazaki	August 25, 2014
Inside Hori's bag, Kashima finds a copy of Nozaki's manga with detailed notes, leading her to believe Hori secretly wants to be a girl. Wishing to help, she replaces his clothes with feminine clothes. While driven crazy by her antics, he is also impressed by how coordinated the feminine clothes are. Later, Hori urges Nozaki to practice drawing backgrounds, a skill the latter is bad at. Much to Hori's frustration, Nozaki places boxes under his characters to compensate for bad art perspective. Hori collapses at school, tired from drawing for Nozaki all night, so Kashima carries him like a horse to the nurse's office while wearing a bull mask. Enchanted when Kashima reveals her face, Hori agrees to draw all of Nozaki's backgrounds as long as Nozaki writes a play about a prince who turns into a bull.
9	"Do You Have Enough Excitement?"; Transliteration: "Dokidoki, Tariteru?" (Japanese: ドキドキ、たりてる?)	Osamu Yamazaki	Masaya Ōbayashi, Hisayuki Seki, Ryōhei Takeshita, Mitsue Yamazaki	Chisato Kikunaga, Masayoshi Kikuchi, Hitomi Kaiho	September 1, 2014
When Sakura and Nozaki forget to bring umbrellas for a rainy day, Nozaki brainstorms manga ideas involving umbrellas. After Seo throws them her umbrella and runs away, Sakura walks home sharing the umbrella with Nozaki. She hopes their walk inspires Nozaki's next issue, only to find just Seo's moment was added. Later, the two observe how Miyako deals with her editor Maeno's crazy recommendations. Miyako struggles to confront Maeno, so she passive-aggressively draws a male character in a gaudy tanuki costume to make a statement. However, Maeno loves the character; even Sakura adores the character once Miyako redraws him to resemble Nozaki. Bothered, Nozaki attempts to draw his own characters in tanuki costumes but Sakura tells him to respect his manga.
10	"What's Strengthened is Our Bond and Our Reins"; Transliteration: "Tsuyomaru no wa, Kizuna to Tazuna" (Japanese: 強まるのは、絆と手綱)	Tetsuto Saitō	Geisei Morita	Manamu Amazaki, Tsubasa Itō, Keiko Ichihara	September 8, 2014
Hoping to write a story for his side characters Oze and Waka, Nozaki has Wakamatsu accept a movie date with Seo. The date ends up one-sided, as Wakamatsu is appalled by Seo's tastes in movies. Offended, she decides to invite other boys to the amusement park, but Wakamatsu offers to go in their place so they don't suffer. When Hori suggests doing a musical production, Kashima requests singing lessons with Seo, as the former is tone-deaf and cannot sing. Later, the drama club is in need of a substitute actor so Hori, Nozaki and then Mikoshiba are volunteered to join. During Mikoshiba's turn, Hori realizes Mikoshiba's shy but determined personality resembles Mamiko. Hori can't help but root for Mikoshiba knowing he is Mamiko, to Kashima's jealousy.
11	"Let's Rice"; Transliteration: "Kome Shiyo" (Japanese: 米しよっ♡)	Ryōhei Takeshita	Ryōhei Takeshita	Kanako Yoshida, Mina Ōtaka, Yumiko Komiyama, Yuka Kudō, Manamu Amazaki	September 15, 2014
Nozaki describes to Sakura how his first impression of Ken was cynical; Nozaki only warmed up to Ken once the latter proved he thoroughly read Nozaki's manga. Later, Nozaki wants to create more excitement within his manga. For reference he pranks Sakura in various ways to surprise her, one of which he hides curry under a bento of rice, to Sakura's delight. In comic form, Ken states the curry idea reminds him of a gourmet manga. Later, Mikoshiba, Hori and Wakamatsu get caught in the rain and stay over at Nozaki's place for shelter. The three awkwardly spend time together without revealing they work for Nozaki's manga. Hori discovers Nozaki is using their interactions as reference for a story about slumber parties. Nozaki persuades them to gossip but he falls asleep right as their conversation becomes interesting.
12	"If This Feeling Isn't Love, Then There Is No Love At All"; Transliteration: "Kono Kimochi ga Koi Janai Nara, Kitto Sekai ni Koi wa Nai." (Japanese: この気持ちが恋じゃないなら、きっと世界に恋はない。)	Mitsue Yamazaki	Mitsue Yamazaki	Miki Takihara, Yuka Kudō, Atsuko Nakajima, Mitsue Mori, Junichirō Taniguchi	September 22, 2014
In the summertime, Sakura finds her Valentine's Day chocolates for Nozaki, which she failed to give due to him gathering research. Seo and Kashima urge her to give Nozaki the chocolates to eat, however he accidentally spills her chocolates on the ground. Nozaki promises to treat her with candy, to which Sakura happily pretends the candy is a White Day gift. Sakura, Nozaki and their friends attend a summer festival where Sakura reminisces of the time she and Nozaki first met, when he lifted her up and over their school gate on the first day of school. During the fireworks display, Sakura quietly confesses her love to Nozaki. Thinking he heard her, he leans in to Sakura and replies that he loves fireworks too. Sakura laughs off his misleading response, knowing she is happy just staying by his side.

=== Live-action drama ===
A live action Chinese drama adaptation titled The Comic Bang (Chinese: 开画！少女漫) began streaming on the platform iQIYI on May 22, 2025. Directed by Zhong Qing, the drama stars Shen Yue and Wang Jingxuan. The drama ran for 33 episodes.

== Reception ==
The manga's second volume reached 18th place on Oricon's weekly manga chart, its third volume reached 11th, and its fourth volume debuted at fifth with 117,310 copies. The fifth manga volume debuted at fourth place, selling 185,392 copies. The series placed third on a list of top 15 manga recommended by bookstores in 2013, and ranked 11th in the list of top 20 manga for female readers of the 2014 edition of Takarajimasha's Kono Manga ga Sugoi! guidebook, which surveys manga industry professionals. It also ranked 11th at the 8th Manga Taishō in 2015.

The official fan book reached 14th, and the anthology book reached 17th on Oricon's weekly best-sellers chart.

Greg Smith of The Fandom Post found the anime adaptation to be a "both a celebration and a send-up of shoujo manga at the same time". He found it to have a natural flow and enjoyed the emotions and expressions presented by the characters. He gave the series an A, noting it was one of the two consistently funny comedies of the season. He liked that "there was in general a lack of meanness or malice (except towards Maeno, which was quite well deserved)," and that it effectively showcased the absurdity of shojo tropes. Andy Hanley of UK Anime Network gave the series 7 out of 10, highlighting its charming and lovable cast as well as the show's visuals, although he would not call it a comedy classic. Dee Hogan, in an article for The Mary Sue, found the show to be "simultaneously very funny and sneakily brilliant" and wrote about how the show "manages the rare feat of a triple-reversal, and all three deal with our understanding of gender roles in fiction".

The reviewers at Anime News Network listed the anime as one of the best of the year for 2014, with Amy McNulty and Theron Martin naming it their top pick. Kelly Quinn of Tor.com also listed it among her top 10 best shows of 2014.
