= TV Shizuoka =

JOQH-DTV JORH-TV (defunct)
- Logo used since 2005

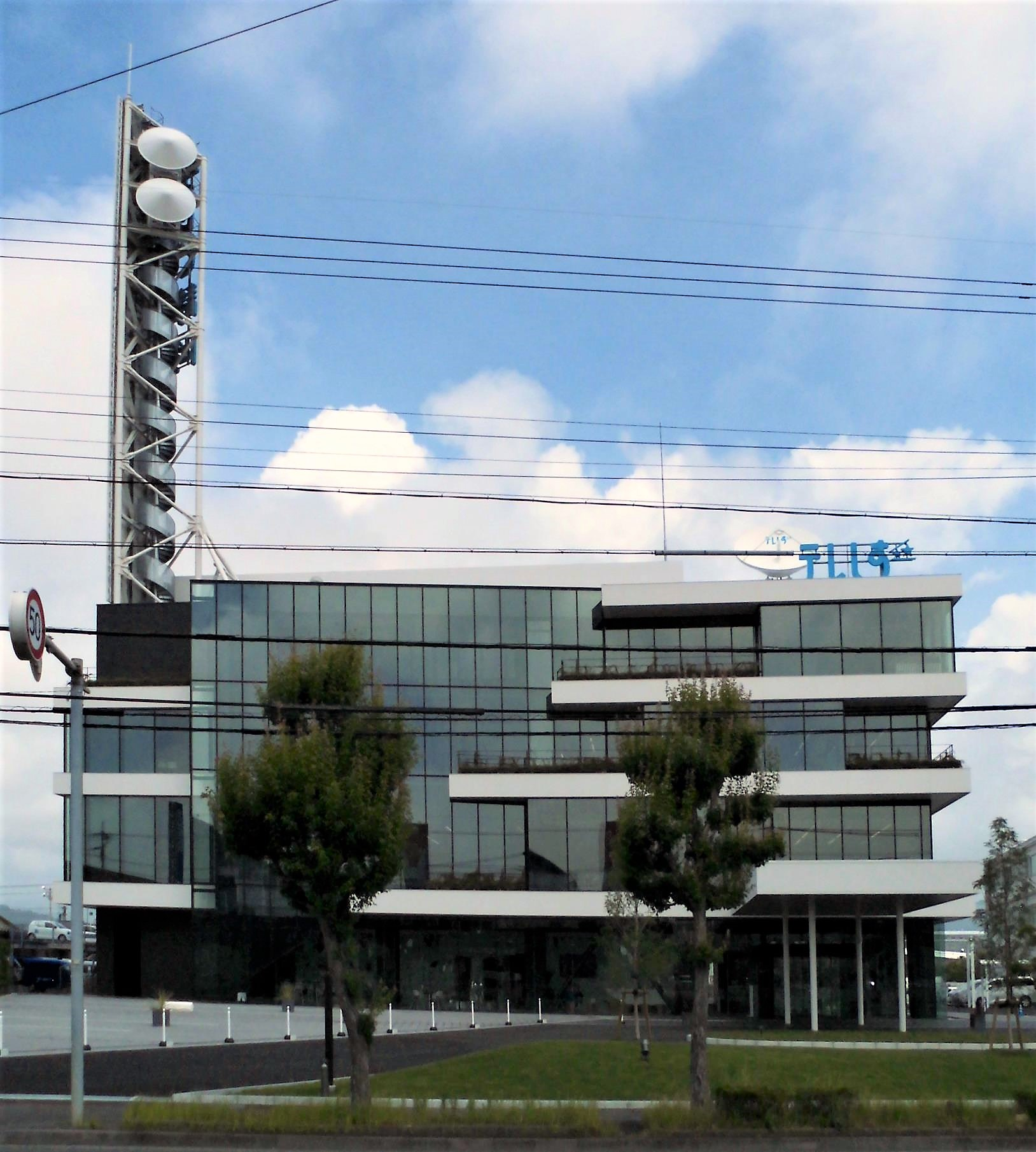
- Headquarters in Suruga-ku, Shizuoka
- Shizuoka Prefecture; Japan
- City: Shizuoka
- Channels: Digital: 17 (UHF); Virtual: 8
- Branding: TV Shizuoka; TeleShizu (テレしず)

Programming
- Language: Japanese
- Affiliations: Fuji News Network and Fuji Network System

Ownership
- Owner: Shizuoka Telecasting Co., Ltd.

History
- Founded: February 13, 1968
- First air date: December 24, 1968
- Last air date: July 24, 2011 (JORH-TV)
- Former call signs: JOQH-TV; JORH-TV (1968–2011)
- Former channel numbers: Analog: 35 (UHF, 1968–2011); JORH-TV: 34 (UHF, 1968–2011)

Technical information
- Licensing authority: MIC

Links
- Website: https://www.sut-tv.com

JOQH-DTV (channel 8), also known as TV Shizuoka (テレビ静岡, Terebi Shizuoka), is a television station headquartered in Shizuoka Prefecture, Japan. The station, which began broadcasting on December 24, 1968, is an affiliate of Fuji News Network and Fuji Network System.

== History ==
On February 25, 1926, Kenjiro Takayanagi of Hamamatsu Technical School in Shizuoka Prefecture successfully displayed the text "(イ)" on a television screen. It was one of the world's earliest television experiments, and Shizuoka Prefecture became the birthplace of Japanese television. On October 16, 1961, Sankei Shimbun and Fuji TV jointly submitted an application to the Tokai Radio Control Bureau for the establishment of "TV Shizuoka Co., Ltd." (株式会社テレビ静岡), which was the earliest company in Shizuoka Prefecture to apply to establish a second private TV station. In the same month, the Chunichi Shimbun also cooperated with Suzuki Motor and other companies to jointly submit an application to establish "Shizuoka Television Co., Ltd." (静岡テレビ株式会社). By April 1962, more than 10 companies in Shizuoka Prefecture had submitted applications to establish a second private television station. In June 1967, the then president of the Sankei Shimbun, Shigeo Mizuno (Hamaoka, Shizuoka Prefecture) (Machi), Fuji TV President Nobutaka Shikanai and Vice President Hideo Fukuda visited Takeharu Kobayashi, the then postal minister elected by Shizuoka Prefecture, hoping that the Ministry of Posts and Telecommunications would release the UHF frequency band for television broadcasting. In September of the same year, Kobayashi stated that he would release UHF TV station licenses in 15 areas including Shizuoka, and release independent station licenses in cities in the wide area broadcasting circle such as Kobe and Gifu. The establishment of the second private TV station in Shizuoka Prefecture began to have a realistic tone. The MPT also invited the Shizuoka Prefectural Government to adjust and integrate the various applicants. The prefectural government requires newspapers outside the prefecture to ensure that Shizuoka's local capital occupies a priority position and is not allowed to send directors. It has obtained unconditional consent from the Sankei Shimbun and Chunichi Shimbun. The three competing newspaper companies (Asahi, Mainichi and Yomiuri) withdrew from the application for the second private television station in Shizuoka Prefecture. On September 19, 1967, all parties that agreed to participate in the application were named "Shizuoka UHF Television Station" (静岡ユー・エッチ・エフ・テレビ) applied to obtain a television license and obtained a preliminary license on November 1. On December 25 of the same year, Shizuoka UHF TV held the Founders' General Meeting. On February 9 of the following year, Shizuoka UHF TV station held a founding meeting, and the company was officially registered on February 13. With the cooperation of the Shizuoka Railway Real Estate Department, Shizuoka UHF TV purchased land in Kurihara, Shizuoka City to build its headquarters. On October 20, 1968, just before the broadcast started, the company name of Shizuoka UHF TV station was changed to TV Shizuoka.

At 8:56 in the morning on November 1, 1968, Shizuoka TV officially launched. When it started broadcasting, Shizuoka TV covered about 80% of the population of Shizuoka Prefecture. On December 24 of the same year, Shizuoka TV began broadcasting commercials, starting its regular service. Shizuoka TV introduced color cameras in 1971 and began broadcasting its own color programs. In July 1973, Shizuoka TV Hamamatsu Headquarters was completed. The building had a larger studio than the Shizuoka headquarters at the time, so it also served as a program production function, producing "Wide in Shizuoka" every Thursday. In October of the same year, the new studio at the Shizuoka TV headquarters was completed, with an area of 315 square meters. It was the largest TV studio in Shizuoka Prefecture at the time. The next year, Shizuoka TV signed a sister station agreement with KMTV in the United States, and became the first overseas sister station. In September 1976, the Shizuoka TV headquarters annex was completed.

In the late 1970s, the third and fourth private TV stations in Shizuoka Prefecture were launched one after another. Shizuoka TV faced more fierce advertising competition, and its turnover decreased for two consecutive years in 1979 and 1980. In 1981, Shizuoka TV’s revenue resumed growth and exceeded 5 billion yen for the first time. But this year, Shizuoka TV's average daily ratings were only 6.7%, ranking third among the four private TV stations in Shizuoka Prefecture. The average viewership rating during prime time is only 12.8%, which is only higher than the 12.7% of Shizuoka Daiichi TV, which was launched last, and lower than the 14.3% of Shizuoka Prefecture Citizen Broadcasting (now Shizuoka Asahi TV) and the 17.4% of Shizuoka Broadcasting. However, relying on the increase in the ratings of the core station Fuji TV, Shizuoka TV won the triple crown of ratings for the first time in June 1984, with ratings of 8.5% for the whole day, 22.9% for the prime time period, and 19.7% for the evening period. In May of the same year, Shizuoka TV began construction of a new headquarters building, which was completed in December of the same year. The new building has a construction area of 1,825 square meters, with three floors, and a new main control room on the second floor. In 1986, Shizuoka TV's sales exceeded the 7 billion yen mark. The following year, Shizuoka TV and South Korea's Daejeon Munhwa Broadcasting signed a sister station agreement. Shizuoka TV station introduced the satellite news broadcast (SNG) system in 1989 to improve the mobility of news reporting.

Shizuoka TV launched the current logo in 2003 and launched the mascot Teleshizu. Shizuoka TV began broadcasting digital TV on November 1, 2005, together with SDT and SATV. On July 24, 2011, Shizuoka TV station stopped broadcasting analog TV. In July 2014, Shizuoka TV began construction of a new headquarters building. This building has 5 floors above ground: the first floor is equipped with a studio and conference room; the second floor is the offices of reporting, production and other departments; the third floor is mainly for the technical department and has a main control room; the fourth floor is for the directors. Office, and has general affairs department, management department and other departments. In October 2017, Shizuoka TV began broadcasting programs from its new headquarters.

The main station (JOQH-TV; channel 35) was founded on February 13, 1968, and began broadcasting on December 24 of that year. Sometime after the station's sign on, a satellite station (JORH-TV; channel 34) began broadcasting from Hamamatsu. On March 23, 2005, the station began testing its digital terrestrial transmissions, which would formally commence on November 1 of that year, together with SDT and SATV. JOQH-TV broadcast simultaneously in both analog and digital formats until July 24, 2011, when JORH-TV permanently ceased broadcasting.
