= Daejeon Munhwa Broadcasting Corporation =

TV and radio station in South Korea

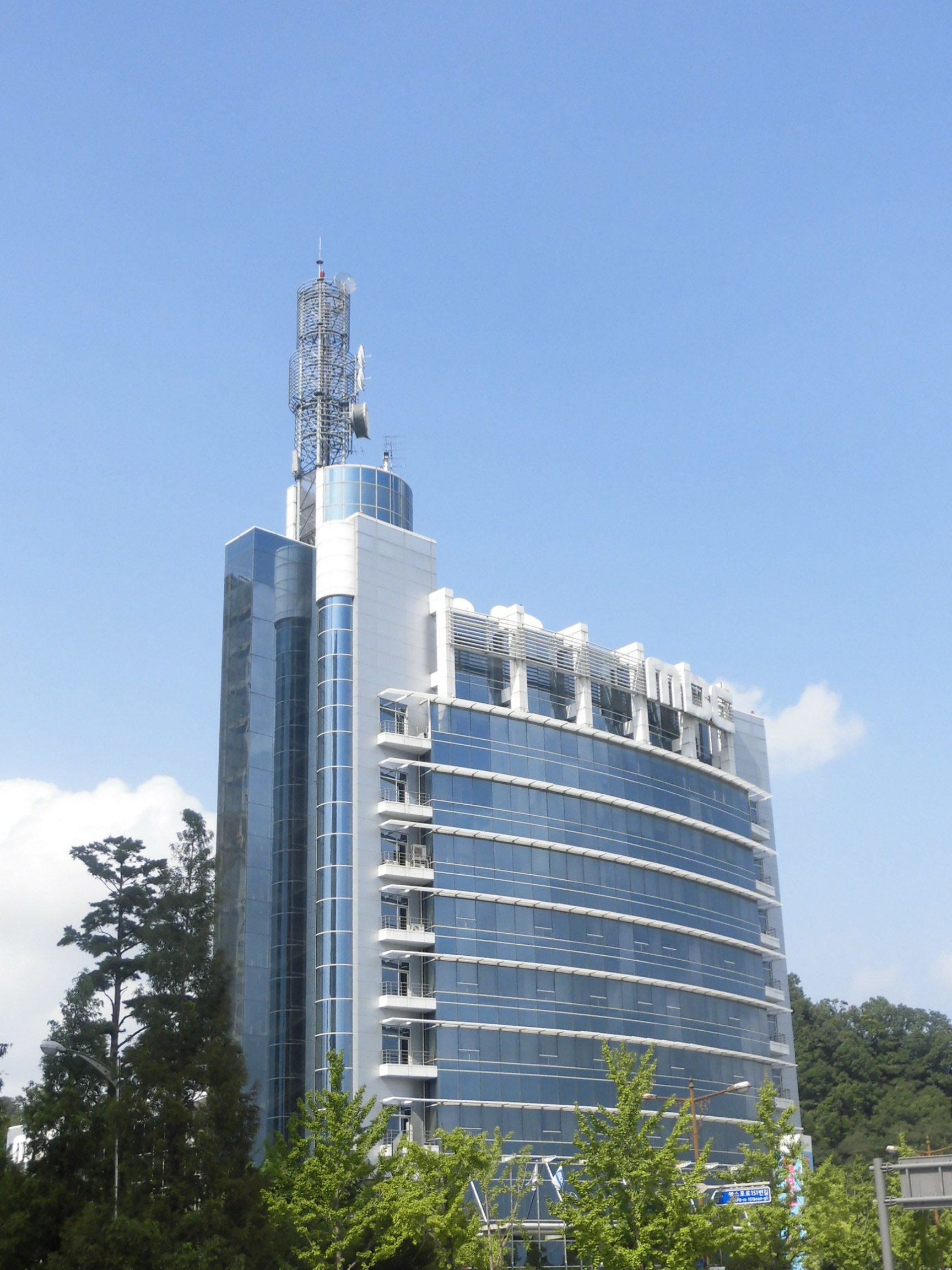
Daejeon MBC's headquarters

The Daejeon Munhwa Broadcasting Corporation (Korean: 대전문화방송) is MBC's local branch for the city of Daejeon. The station uses the HLCQ callsign.

== History ==
Daejeon MBC was founded on 12 April 1963 and started radio broadcasts on 26 September 1964. On 7 April 1971, it started broadcasting from a new building at Seonhwa-dong. Television broadcasts started under a separate company, Daejeon Television (Korean: 대전텔레비전방송주식회사), on 24 April 1971, callsign HLAZ-TV, channel 8. On June 20, 2006, it signed a sister station agreement with Kumamoto Asahi Broadcasting.

There are plans (since January 2021) to relocate Daejeon MBC, as well as the corporate facilities in Seoul, to Sejong City as well as the creation of a dedicated Sejong MBC unit.

== Controversies ==
In 2014, Daejeon MBC's Current Affairs Plus was accused of reporting the real name of a victim of sexual harassment, believing it was a pseudonym, creating misinformation on the subject. In 2019, presenters left Daejeon MBC over sexism controversies and violation of human rights. On 15 September 2020, it was criticized for airing the exact same items on the 12 September edition of its news bulletin.
