= Mitsu no Aji: A Taste of Honey =

- Written by: Shizuka Ōishi
- Starring: Nana Eikura; Miho Kanno; Arata
- Country of origin: Japan
- Original language: Japanese
- No. of seasons: 1
- No. of episodes: 11

Production
- Running time: 54 minutes

Original release
- Network: Fuji TV
- Release: October 13, 2011 – present

Mitsu no Aji: A Taste of Honey (蜜の味〜A Taste Of Honey〜) is a Japanese television drama series that premiered on Fuji TV on October 13, 2011. The theme song of the series is "Zutto", by Aiko.

== Cast ==
- Nana Eikura
- Miho Kanno
- Arata
- Junpei Mizobata
- Tomohiro Ichikawa
- Fumino Kimura
- Ren Mori
- Koen Kondo
- Takeshi Masu
- Shirō Sano
- Shigenori Yamazaki
- Maki Nishiyama
- Kenji Anan
- Midoriko Kimura
