= Kana Uemura =

Kana Uemura 植村 花菜
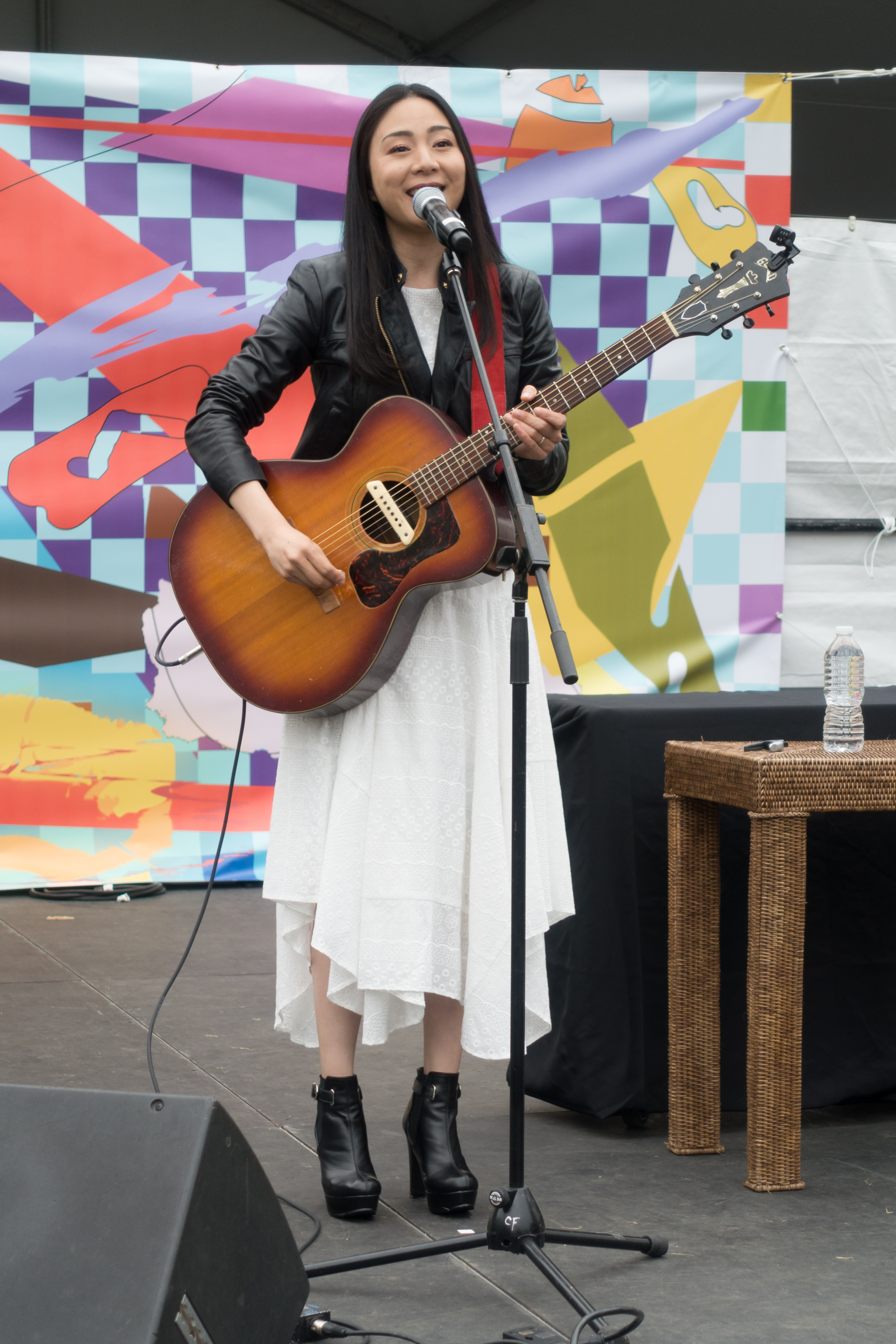

Background information
- Born: 4 January 1983 (age 43)
- Origin: Kawanishi, Hyōgo, Japan
- Genres: Pop, folk
- Occupation: Singer-songwriter
- Instruments: Vocals, guitar
- Years active: 2004–present
- Labels: Bellwood (2004); King Records (2005–present)
- Website: www.clearsky.co.jp/kana

Kana Uemura (植村 花菜, Uemura Kana; born 4 January 1983), known professionally as Ka-Na, is a Japanese singer-songwriter, who debuted in 2004. She is best known for her song "Toilet no Kamisama", an acoustic ballad about her grandmother, which became a hit in 2010.

== Biography ==
Uemura first became interested in music, after watching Julie Andrews performance in the 1965 film The Sound of Music. In 2002, she started learning the guitar, as well as writing her own songs and doing street performances.

== Discography ==
=== Studio albums ===
Year	Album information	Chart positions	Total sales
2006	Itsumo Waratte Irareru Yō ni (いつも笑っていられるように; "So I Can Always Be Laughing"): Released: 4 January 2006; Label: King; Formats: CD, digital download	77	10,000
2007	Shiawase no Hako o Hiraku Kagi (しあわせの箱を開くカギ; "The Key to Open the Box of Happiness"): Released: 4 January 2007; Label: King; Formats: CD, digital download	120	7,300
2007	Ai to Taiyō (愛と太陽; "Love and the Sun"): Released: 7 November 2007; Label: King; Formats: CD, digital download	62	3,300

=== Self-cover album ===
Year	Album information	Chart positions	Total sales
2010	Kana: My Favorite Things (花菜 ～My Favorite Things～): Self-cover/collaborations album; Released: 15 September 2010; Label: King (KICS-1213); Formats: CD, digital download	21	22,000

=== Extended plays ===
Year	Album information	Chart positions	Total sales
2004	Kana (花菜): Charted on singles charts; Released: 30 June 2004; Label: Bellwood (BZCM-1011); Formats: CD, digital download	—	—
2009	Haru no Sora (春の空; "Spring Sky"): Released: 25 March 2009; Label: King (KICS-1213); Formats: CD, digital download	80	2,700
2010	Watashi no Kakera-tachi (わたしのかけらたち; "My Pieces"): Released: 10 March 2010; Label: King (KIZC-59/60); Formats: CD, digital download	10	117,000

=== Singles ===
Release	Title	Notes	Chart positions			Oricon sales	Album
Release	Title	Notes	Oricon singles charts	Billboard Japan Hot 100	RIAJ digital tracks	Oricon sales	Album
2005	"Taisetsu na Hito" (大切な人; "Important One")		73	—	—	3,000	Itsumo Waratte Irareru Yō ni
2005	"Milk Tea" (ミルクティー, Miruku Tī)		85	—	—	3,800	Itsumo Waratte Irareru Yō ni
2005	"Kiseki/Koi no Mahō" (キセキ/恋の魔法; "Miracle/The Magic of Love")		75	—	—	2,300	Itsumo Waratte Irareru Yō ni
2006	"Yasashisa ni Tsutsumareta Nara" (やさしさに包まれたなら; "If You Wrap Yourself in Kindness")	Yumi Matsutoya cover	49	—	—	5,600	Shiawase no Hako o Hiraku Kagi
2006	"Kami Hikōki" (紙ヒコーキ; "Paper Plane")		79	—	—	2,000	Shiawase no Hako o Hiraku Kagi
2006	"Hikari to Kage" (光と影; "Light and Dark")		90	—	—	6,200	Shiawase no Hako o Hiraku Kagi
2007	"Only You"	Digital single, written by Sandi Thom	—	—	—	—	Ai to Taiyō
2007	"Anata no Sono Egao wa Ii Hint ni Naru" (あなたのその笑顔はいいヒントになる; "That Face of Yours Is a Good Hint")		85	—	—	1,200	Ai to Taiyō
2008	"Shalala" (シャララ)		60	34	—	1,500	Haru no Sora
2009	"Bless/Haru ni Shite Kimi o Omou" (BLESS/春にして君を想う; "BLESS/I Think of You in Spring")	Sold only in the Kansai region for the promotion by Mainichi Broadcasting System, Inc. in February 2009	188	26	—	400	Haru no Sora
2010	"Toilet no Kamisama" (トイレの神様; "Goddess in the Toilet")	Initially released as a promotional single	1	1	1	137,000	Watashi no Kakera-tachi
2011	"My Favorite Songs/Sekaiichi Gohan" (My Favorite Songs/世界一ごはん; "My Favorite Songs/The World's Best Meal")		41	―	—	4,900	TBA
2012	"Message" (メッセージ, Messēji)	Theme song of the film "Magic Tree House"	64	3	TBA	1,500	TBA
