= Toilet no Kamisama =

Single by Kana Uemura

from the album Watashi no Kakera-tachi
- Released: July 14, 2010
- Recorded: Studio Crybaby (2009); Avaco Creative Studio (strings) (December 23, 2009)
- Genre: Folk, acoustic
- Length: 9:52
- Label: King Records
- Songwriters: Kana Uemura, Hiroshi Yamada
- Producer: Yohito Teraoka

Kana Uemura singles chronology
"Bless/Haru ni Shite Kimi o Omou" (2009)	"Toilet no Kamisama" (2010)	"My Favorite Songs" (2011)

Music video
- "Toilet no Kamisama" at YouTube

"Toilet no Kamisama" (トイレの神様, Toire no Kamisama; "The Goddess in the Toilet") is a song by Japanese singer-songwriter Kana Uemura, recounting her thoughts about her late grandmother. It was the leading track from her extended play Watashi no Kakera-tachi, released on March 10, 2010. The song was re-recorded with Kotaro Oshio, and used as a promotional track from Uemura's self-cover album, Kana: My Favorite Things, later in September 2010.

The song was popular enough to boost Uemura's popularity, being downloaded more than 250,000 times to cellphones and 250,000 times to PCs and boosting the sales of Watashi no Kakera-tachi, giving Uemura her first gold-certified album. The song inspired several other media, such as an autobiographical book by Uemura, as well as a special drama to celebrate the 60th anniversary of the opening of Mainichi Broadcasting System.

The song was awarded two Japan Record Awards in 2010, one in the general song category along with 9 other songs, as well as Uemura being awarded the lyricist award for the song.

== Writing ==
The song is a ballad, beginning with a simple guitar-based arrangement and later expanding to a band and orchestra arrangement. The song's lyrics are an extended narrative that tell the story of Uemura and her grandmother. When she was a 3rd grader (8 years old), she lived at her grandmother's house next door to her parents, playing gomoku, eating nanban-style duck noodle soup when they went out shopping, watching videotapes of the comedy program Yoshimoto Shinkigeki and helping her every day. Uemura was not very fond of cleaning toilets, so her grandmother told her that a beautiful goddess lives in the toilet, if she cleaned it every day, this goddess would make her into a beautiful woman. As Uemura grew older, the communication gap between her and her grandmother worsened and the two grew apart. Uemura, feeling resentful, moved away from home with her then boyfriend and rarely came home to visit. Her grandmother later became more ill and was hospitalized two years after Uemura left for Tokyo. Uemura visited her, saying "Grandma, I'm home!" as she used to when she was little, before the two began to fight. Her grandmother could not say much and the next morning died quietly in her sleep. Uemura believes her grandmother was waiting for her, besides being left alone from her all this time. She feels regret for hurting her grandmother and says thank you to her at the end of the song.

The song mentions several words in Kansai dialect, especially in the way the grandmother speaks. She adds yade (やで) to the ends of her sentences, and uses specifically Kansai terms, such as beppin (べっぴん; "Beautiful Woman") and kamo nanba (鴨なんば; "Nanban-style duck noodle soup"), instead of standard Japanese bijin (美人) and kamo nanban (鴨南蛮). Uemura thanks her grandmother by saying honma ni arigatō (ホンマにありがとう), as opposed to hontō ni arigatō (本当に ありがとう). While the song is called "Toilet no Kamisama," the word kamisama (神様; "god") is not used in the song, instead the song talks about a megami (女神; "goddess") in the toilet.

When Uemura met music producer Yohito Teraoka, her self-introduction featured the story of her grandmother. Teraoka suggested they turn this story into a song.

== Promotion ==
The song was first aired at FM802, on "Hiro T's Morning Jam" on January 7, 2010, and began receiving radio play in the song's full length. The song was released as a free ringtone from February 10, until March 9, when it became a paid ringtone.

Uemura performed at the 61st Kōhaku Uta Gassen New Years' singing battle. She performed the full-length version of "Toilet no Kamisama." The performance was one of the longest in Kōhaku's history, after Tsuyoshi Nagabuchi's 15 minute performance in 1990. She also performed the song on Yoshimoto Shinkigeki's new years' special during the curtain call, the television show mentioned in Uemura's song.

== Music videos ==
Kana Uemura in the live-action music video

A scene from the Daisuke Hashimoto/Mari Torigoe animated version

Two music videos were produced for the song: a live action version directed by Tatsuaki, which was shot on January 23, 2010, and an animated version by Daisuke Hashimoto, set to the version from Kana: My Favorite Things featuring Kotaro Oshio.

The live action version features Uemura performing the song on guitar on a sunlit river bank, interspersed with scenes of a grandmother and several different actresses portraying the scenes described in the song. The final scenes show the grandmother walking with the adolescent actress along the river bank where Uemura sung the song. The Hashimoto animated version similarly enacts the storyline from the song, featuring drawings of a grandmother and a small girl. The video's artwork is based on the Toilet no Kamisama picture book, illustrated by Mari Torigoe, and released in September 2010.

== Adaptations ==
The song inspired two books by Uemura, both with the same title. The first is an autobiography released in July 2010 through Takarajimasha, telling anecdotes about her grandmother and the process of making the song. The second is a picture book version, published through Kodansha in September 2010. The version features illustrations by Mari Torigoe.

Mainichi Broadcasting System, Inc. aired a two-hour drama based on the autobiography Toilet no Kamisama on January 5, 2011, on 28 stations including itself, TBS and CBC, also on Akita TV on January 8. It was one of the programs for the 60th anniversary of the opening of MBS. The drama starred Kii Kitano as Uemura, and Shima Iwashita as her grandmother. The drama's plot is inspired by the events described in Uemura's Toilet no Kamisama autobiography, such as the death of her grandfather and her path to becoming a singer.

Under the influence of the Tohoku earthquake and tsunami which occurred on March 11, 2011, MBS aired the drama again on March 16, instead of "Ichi-Hachi Final Special", on 26 stations except TBC and TV U Fukushima.

The drama received the TV Film Prize in the 17th Shanghai TV Festival International Program Contest in May 2011.

=== Main cast and staff in drama ===
(from MBS drama Toilet no Kamisama website)

Main cast
- Kana Uemura: Mana Ashida (in her childhood) / Kii Kitano (after growing up)
- Waka Uemura (Kana's grandmother): Shima Iwashita
- Yoko Uemura (Kana's mother): Yui Natsukawa
- Shunji Uemura (Kana's grandfather): Nenji Kobayashi
- Daisuke (Kana's boyfriend in her high school days): Shohei Miura
Staff
- Dramawriter: Shizuka Oki
- Producers: Yasuo Yagi (TBS), Hajime Takezono (MBS), Hiroaki Kamei (MBS-Planning Corp.)
- Director: Hajime Takezono (MBS)
- Production cooperated by MBS-Planning Corporation
- Copyrighted by Mainichi Broadcasting System, Inc.

== Track listing ==
No.	Title	Length
1.	"Toilet no Kamisama"	9:52
2.	"Toilet no Kamisama (Karaoke)"	9:52
Total length:		19:44

DVD
No.	Title	Animator	Length
1.	"Toilet no Kamisama (Animation Music Clip)" (Kana Uemura with Kotaro Oshio)	Daisuke Hashimoto	9:52

== Chart rankings ==
Chart	Peak position
Billboard Adult Contemporary Airplay	6
Billboard Japan Hot 100	1
Oricon daily singles	1
Oricon weekly singles	1
RIAJ Digital Track Chart weekly top 100	1
RIAJ Digital Track Chart weekly top 100: "Toilet no Kamisama" with Kotaro Oshio	45
RIAJ Digital Track Chart yearly top 100	37

=== Sales and certifications ===
Chart	Amount
Oricon physical sales	137,000
RIAJ physical shipping certification	Gold (100,000+)
RIAJ full-length cellphone downloads	Platinum (250,000+)
RIAJ PC downloads	Platinum (250,000+)

== Personnel ==
- Kana Uemura - acoustic guitar, lyrics, music, vocals
- Hiroshi Hiranuma - recording engineer
- Haruki Mino - acoustic piano, celesta
- Eiji Shimamura - drums
- Masatsugu Shinozaki - string section arranger
- Shinozaki Strings - string instruments
- Kenji Takamizu - bass
- Yohito Teraoka - arranger, producer, recording engineer
- Hiroshi Yamada - additional lyrics

== Release history ==
Region	Date	Format
Japan	January 7, 2010	Radio debut
Japan	February 10, 2010	Ringtone
Japan	July 14, 2010	Cellphone download
Japan	August 18, 2010	PC download
Japan	November 24, 2010	CD single, rental CD

== See also ==
- Toilet god
