= Daisuke Nakamura (actor) =

Japanese actor

- 中村 太亮
- Born: 21 September 1985 (age 39); Chiba Prefecture, Japan
- Occupations: Actor; voice actor
- Years active: 2004–present
- Agent: Mausu Promotion
- Height: 167 cm (5 ft 6 in)

Daisuke Nakamura (中村 太亮, Nakamura Daisuke, born 21 September 1985) is a Japanese actor and voice actor from Chiba Prefecture, Japan. Daisuke is probably most known for the roles as Colonnello in Reborn! and Yamato Akitsuki in Suzuka.

== Filmography ==
=== Stage ===
- Three Sisters

=== Anime ===
- Honey and Clover (Key Animation)
- Karin (Key Animation)
- R.O.D the TV (Key Animation (ep. 2,3))
- Reborn! (Voice of Colonnello)
- Mamotte! Lollipop (Voice of Ichii)
- Suzuka (Voice of Yamato Akitsuki)
- Yu-Gi-Oh! GX (Voiced of Chick, Laughter Mask (Yamanaka), N-Air Hummingbird)
- Kekkaishi (Voice of Haroku (ep. 28–29))
- Kämpfer (Key Animation)
- Mobile Suit Gundam 00 (Key Animation (ep.21))
- Code Geass: Lelouch of the Rebellion (Key Animation (ep. 21))

=== OVA ===
- The Prince of Tennis: The National Tournament (Voice of Yuujirou Kai)

=== Drama CDs ===
- Oresama Teacher (Yamashita Takumi)
