= Kumamoto Asahi Broadcasting =

JOZI-DTV

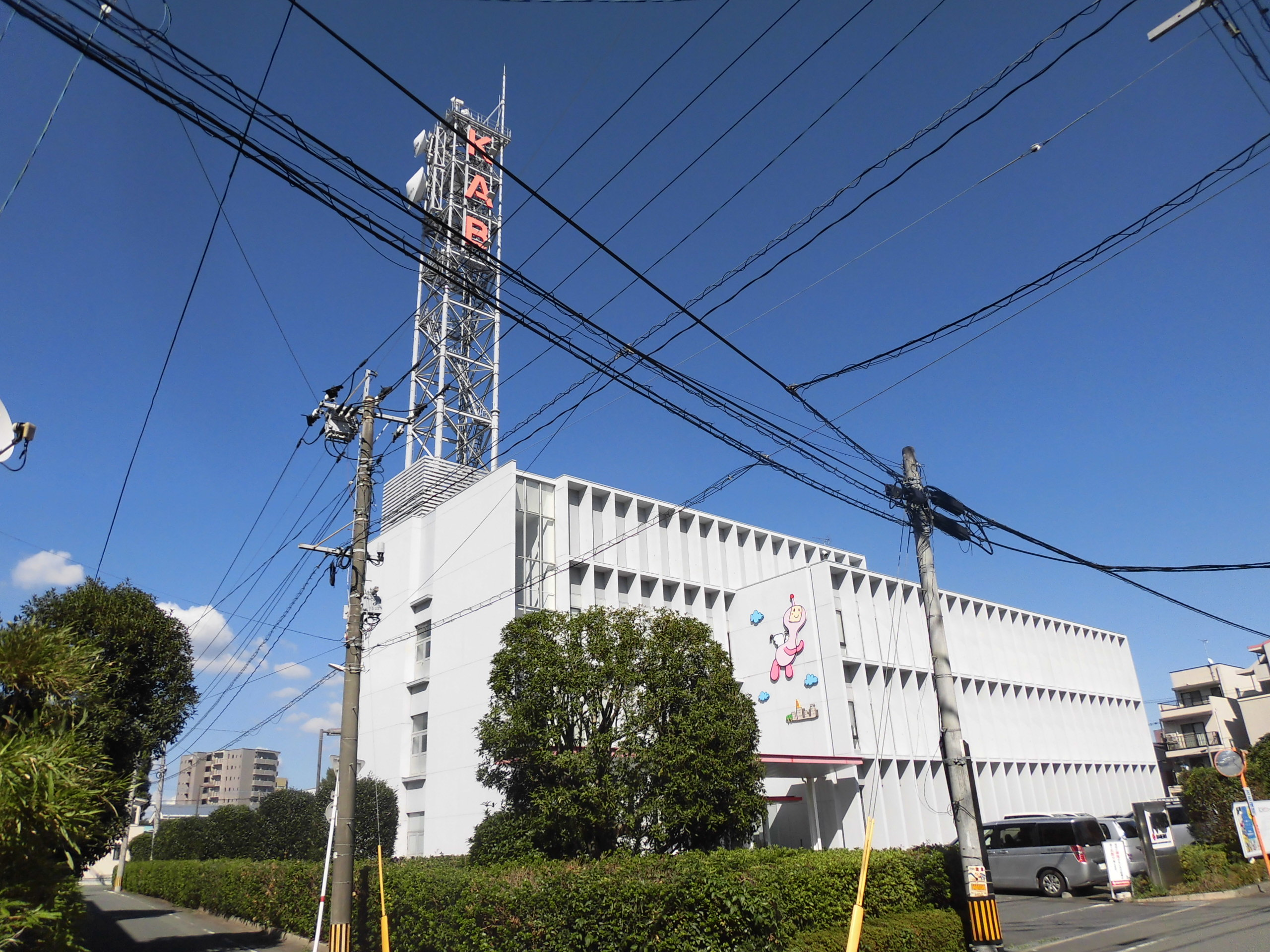

Kumamoto Prefecture; Japan
- City: Kumamoto City
- Channels: Digital: 49 (UHF); Virtual: 5

Programming
- Language: Japanese
- Affiliations: All-Nippon News Network

Ownership
- Owner: Kumamoto Asahi Broadcasting Corporation

History
- Founded: December 16, 1988
- First air date: October 1, 1989
- Former call signs: JOZI-TV (1989–2011)
- Former channel numbers: Analog: 16 (UHF; 1989–2011)

Technical information
- Licensing authority: MIC

Links
- Website: www.kab.co.jp

Kumamoto Asahi Broadcasting Co., Ltd. (熊本朝日放送株式会社, Kumamoto Asahi Hōsō Kabushiki-gaisha), also known as KAB, is a Japanese broadcast network affiliated with the ANN. Their headquarters are located in Kumamoto Prefecture.

== History ==
=== Pre-launch ===
In the 1980s, following the MPT's policy of permitting four commercial TV stations accessible nationwide, Kumamoto Prefecture was allocated the fourth private TV broadcaster in 1984, and attracted 482 applicants (215 of which belonged to the Asahi Shimbun Group) to apply. In 1986, the Ministry of Posts commissioned the Kumamoto Prefectural Government to consolidate the applications. After nearly 2 years of the consolidated applications, the other companies agreed to integrate into one for application. On October 5, 1988, before the opening of the station, the name of the station was decided as Kumamoto Asahi Broadcasting. A month later, they have obtained a preliminary license and a day before its opening, a general meeting was held. In July 1989, KAB moved into the Technology Plaza Building in Hanabata-cho, Kumamoto City, and started testing TV broadcasts on August 15. On September 22, KAB was granted an official license and started another trial broadcasts.

=== Launch and further developments ===
On October 1, 1989, KAB started broadcasting, becoming the fourth station in the prefecture (TV Asahi/ANN programming aired from RKK TV & TKU also moved into the new station). On its second year, it started broadcasting the Kumamoto Prefecture qualifiers of the Japan High School Baseball Championship. In 1991, when Kumamoto Prefecture was hit by Typhoon Mireille, some of its relay stations were damaged forcing to go off air. In 1993, the station gained the local rights to the J-League, airing some Yokohama Flügels matches. In the same year, it invited the Leningrad Ballet from Russia, to present the first performance of a foreign ballet company in the prefecture. In 1996, the station launched its official website.

The station co-operated with Ehime Asahi Television in 2000 in line with the opening of Amakusa Airport. Both station extolled the virtues of their prefectures. In order to diversify its revenues beyond advertising, the station started a housing exhibit in 2001. It signed its first international sister station agreement with Daejeon MBC in 2006.

=== New headquarters ===
Plans to introduce headquarters of its own began in 1995. During its plans to do so in 1999, it found an archaeological relic in Nibonki, the selected location for its new headquarters: the remains of a government office. In March 2004, KAB started construction work, built by Toda Construction and finished in June of the following year. On October 1, 2005, broadcasting from there began. A two-hour special was made observing the change. The building has three floors and a size of 4,232.06 square meters.

Until 2004, ratings for the station were still considered to be low in all metrics, being in last or second-to-last place. The trend was reversed beginning in 2003, when its ratings began to consistently improve. It had ended up in second place in the daytime, evening and prime time slots, as well as in first place between 11pm and 1am, in 2008.

KAB's Kumamoto main station commenced their digital terrestrial television broadcasting service on December 1, 2006, and, in tandem, started broadcasting in high definition. Signal penetration of the digital transmitter network had reached 95,5% of the prefecture in 2008. The analog signal shut down on July 24, 2011.

== Programming ==
In its years, KAB's news program was KAB 600 Station. By 2019, it was renamed Kuma Power J.
