= 2010 in Japanese music =

The following is a list of notable events and releases that occurred in 2010 in Japanese music.

== Events ==
=== January ===
- January 10 – RIAJ certifies pop/dance group Exile's album Aisubeki Mirai e (released December 2009) as a million selling album. Namie Amuro's Past Future received a double platinum certification.
- January 13 – Pop musician Ayumi Hamasaki extends the own record for the artist with most top 10 singles (45), with the release of her single "You Were.../Ballad".
- January 15 – February 12 – Hikaru Utada holds her first tour of the United States/United Kingdom, Utada: In The Flesh 2010.
- January 21 – The second annual CD Shop Taishō awards are announced, with The Bawdies' This Is My Story and Lady Gaga's The Fame winning the grand prizes. The awards are voted on by individual members of the National Japanese CD Shop Employee Union.
- January 22 – Voice actress Nana Mizuki reached #1 on the Oricon single charts with her single "Phantom Minds", making her the first voice actress in charting history to have a #1 single (she broke this record for the album charts in 2009 with Ultimate Diamond).
- January 23 – The mother of Hello! Project/Avex musician Maki Goto, Tokiko Goto, falls from her home and dies. The resulting funeral on January 28 is heavily publicised, with many Hello! Project-associated people attending the funeral.
- January 29 – R&B singer Double announces her return to musical activities, after last year going on hiatus due to illness.
- January 29 – U-ka Saegusa in dB perform their final live, at Big Cat in Osaka.
- January 31 – The first Billboard Japan Music Awards are held in Tokyo, with Exile winning the Artist of the Year award.

=== February ===
- February 3 – One Ok Rock release their first single since their hiatus, "Kanzen Kankaku Dreamer." The band went on hiatus in May 2009 due to guitarist Alex's arrest for assault, who is now no longer a member of the band.
- February 10 – RIAJ certifies band Ikimono-gakari's album Hajimari no Uta (released December 2009) as double platinum album.
- February 10 – Rapper You the Rock was arrested for cannabis possession, after 2mgs of dried cannabis, along with related cannabis paraphernalia such as a pipe, were found at his home in Meguro, Tokyo.
- February 15 – R&B singer Shion has her trial for possession/use of the drug ketamine. She pleaded guilty, and was given a one-year sentence, suspended for three years.
- February 22 – Mika Nakashima's song "Always" is the first song released in 2010 to receive a digital certification. It was certified gold by the RIAJ for Chaku-Uta Full (cellphone digital downloads) for the January 2010 period.
- February 23 – AKB48's single "Sakura no Shiori" sells 318,000 copies in its first week, making it the biggest opening sales for a female group single since Morning Musume's "Mr. Moonlight (Ai no Big Band)" in July 2001. This record was later beaten by their single "Ponytail to Chouchou."
- February 23 – Korean boy band Tohoshinki's first greatest hits album, Best Selection 2010, sells 413,000 copies in its first week. This gives the band their first #1 album, as well as breaking the record for the highest first week sales by a foreign group. The previous record holder was Bon Jovi's These Days in 1995, with 379,000 copies.
- February 24 – The 24th Japan Gold Disc Awards are held in Tokyo. Arashi wins the domestic Artist of the Year award, making them the first Johnny's boyband to win this award. Hilcrhyme wins the New Artist of the Year award.
- February 24 – Minori Chihara releases her eight CD single Yasashii Bōkyaku. The song won the Best Singing Award at the fifth annual Seiyu Awards held in 2011 in Tokyo for Chihara's performance. It is used as the ending theme to the anime film The Disappearance of Haruhi Suzumiya.

=== March ===
- March 7 – Idol group Idoling!!! announces five new members to their line-up, after auditions were held on March 6. The new members are Kaoru Gotō (後藤郁), Yūna Itō (伊藤祐奈), Ruka Kurata (倉田瑠夏), Manami Nomoto (野元愛) and Chika Ojima (尾島知佳), all between 13 and 15 years of age. Approximately 5,000 girls auditioned for the group.
- March 9 – Boy band Arashi's "Troublemaker" sells 542,000 copies in its first week, making it the current #1 single of the year.
- March 9 – Kōichi Nakamura (中村耕一), vocalist of the 1980s rock band Jaywalk, was arrested for illegal stimulant possession. The band was put into hiatus, with their 30th anniversary releases/events cancelled and their contract with Warner Music Japan nulled.
- March 10 – RIAJ certifies two albums for double platinum status: Kaela Kimura's 5 Years and Tohoshinki's Best Selection 2010. Both albums are the first to be released in 2010 to receive double platinum certifications.
- March 12 – Kana Nishino's song "Best Friend" tops the RIAJ Digital Track Chart for the third week.
- March 20 – Shonen Knife's drummer Etsuko Nakanishi retires from the band after five years, during the band's 13th Fandango concert (十三ファンダンゴ) in Osaka.
- March 21 – Rock musician Gackt performs the first men's only concert in Kawasaki, Kanagawa.
- March 22 – The 14th Space Shower Music Video Awards are aired. Namie Amuro's "Fast Car" wins the Best Video of the Year Award (as well as Best Art Direction). Ringo Shiina was awarded the Best Artist award (along with the Best Female Video award for her song "Tsugō no Ii Karada.")
- March 24 – Hiro, leader of R&B group Exile, became the centre of a tax enquiry after failing to report approximately ¥300,000,000 in earnings at his entertainment production company LDH. Hiro later stated the discrepancy was unintentional.
- March 25 – Hip-hop/reggae group Spontania add singer Kaori Natori as a permanent female vocalist to their line-up. The band's first release as a three-member group was a digital single, "Now or Never," released 8 days earlier without any indication of the line-up change.
- March 29 – Soh of the band Greeeen passes his National Dentistry Examination exam, making all members of the group certified dentists. Bandmates Hide and 92 passed the exam in 2008, while Navi passed it in 2009.
- March 30 – Akira Akasaka, former member of Johnny's idol group Hikaru Genji, was sentenced to 18 months in prison for using illegal stimulants. His prison sentence was increased to a period of three years, however, due to his previous suspended sentence for possession of stimulants in November 2007.

=== April ===
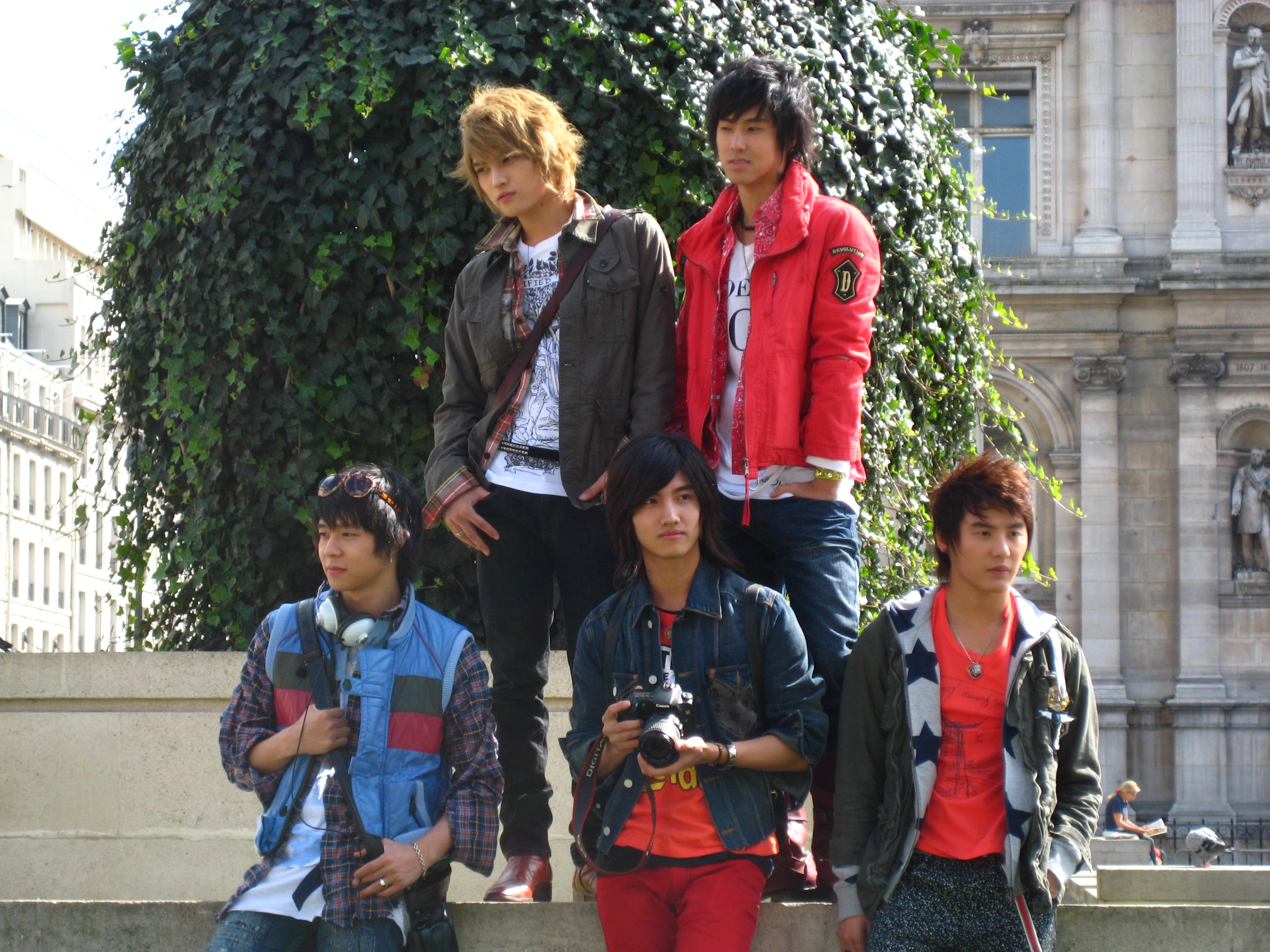
Boyband Tohoshinki went on an indefinite hiatus, followed by the announcement of a three-member subunit (made of Jejung, Junsu and Yuchun).

- April 3 – Girl band Maria perform their final live at the Akasaka Blitz, after announcing their plans to disband due to drummer Tattsu suffering from thoracic outlet syndrome.
- April 3 – Avex Management announce the hiatus of Korean boyband Tohoshinki's activities in Japan. The band's solo activities continued, with the Jejung starring drama Sunao ni Narenakute airing in mid April, and Junsu's solo debut single announced for release in May.
- April 9 – Fuyumi Sakamoto tops the RIAJ Digital Track Chart with her song "Mata Kimi ni Koi Shiteru," becoming the first enka singer to achieve this.
- April 10 – Funky Monkey Babys' greatest hits collection, Funky Monkey Babys Best was certified as double platinum by the RIAJ. Arashi's "Troublemaker" becomes the first single released in 2010 to be certified as double platinum. Orianthi's Believe becomes the first non-domestic album to receive a certification (gold).
- April 14 – Johnny's boyband Arashi's DVD Arashi Anniversary Tour 5x10 breaks the first week sales record for a music DVD, with 477,000 copies. Arashi were also the previous record holder, with 5x10 All the Best! Clips 1999–2009 selling 428,000 copies in a week in April 2009.
- April 15 – Rhythm Zone announce a three-member subgroup created from some of the members of boyband Tohoshinki, after the group's hiatus announced earlier in the month. The members, Jejung, Junsu and Yuchun, are the band members who filed a lawsuit against SM Entertainment in 2009.
- April 16 – Japanese media begin levelling accusations against the public relations theme song for Shanghai Expo 2010, "Ėrlíngyīlíng Děng Nǐ Lái" (2010 等你来 2010 Right Here Waiting for You), as being plagiarised from a 1997 song by Mayo Okamoto, "Sono Mama no Kimi de Ite." The executive committee for the event later admitted the song had been plagiarised by the songwriter Miao Senshi (繆森氏), and Okamoto gave permission for the rights for her song to be used.
- April 17 – The music video is from Uverworld's single, "Gold," is premiered today, making it the first 3D music video released by a Japanese artist.
- April 20 – Kana Nishino's song "Best Friend" becomes the first song released in 2010 to receive a double platinum digital certification. The song had been downloaded over 500,000 times as a ringtone (Chaku-Uta) since its release in late February.
- April 27 – Kazumasa Oda's greatest hits album Jiko Best charts for its 400th week, since its release in 2002. As of 2010, no other album has charted long enough to reach this milestone.

=== May ===
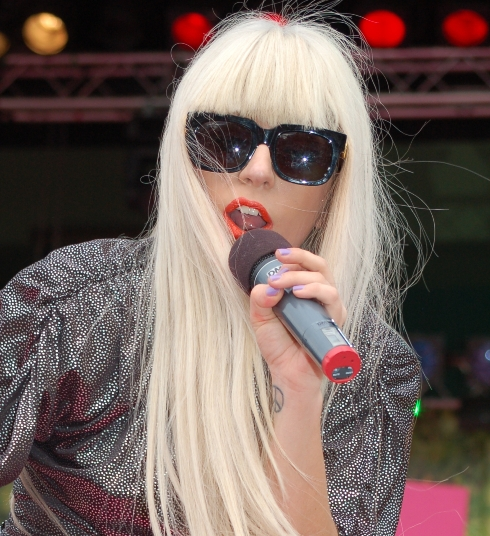
American pop singer Lady Gaga's album The Fame becomes one of only four Western albums since 2008 to receive a multi-platinum certification.

- May 3 – The Underneath perform their final concert as "The Underneath," at the Shibuya O-West, before changing their band name to Defspiral.
- May 3 – Hello! Project group Melon Kinenbi hold their final concert Nakano Sun Plaza, before disbanding. The group celebrated their 10th anniversary earlier in the year.
- May 4 – The second theme songs for the anime K-On!, "Go! Go! Maniac" and "Listen!!" (performed by the fictional band Ho-kago Tea Time reached #1 and #2 respectively on Oricon's single charts. This is the first time that a release credited to anime characters has topped the singles charts.
- May 4 – Lady Gaga becomes the first Western artist to have two albums in the top 10 in 18 years, with The Fame Monster and The Remix. This last time this happened was with Bruce Springsteen's Human Touch and Lucky Town in 1992.
- May 5 – The first music composition by Avex songwriter Tetsuya Komuro is released since his fraud case in 2008. He wrote the music for the songs on pop group AAA's single "Aitai Riyū/Dream After Dream (Yume Kara Sameta Yume)."
- May 10 – The Brilliant Green announces at their official sit the leaving of guitarist Ryo Matsui from the band's line-up. The band plans to continue on as a duo.
- May 12 – RIAJ certifies Lady Gaga's album The Fame (released May 2009) as double platinum album. The previous Western album to be certified so highly was Michael Jackson's King of Pop (Japan Edition) in November 2009.
- May 14 – Oricon reports that Kobukuro's 2006 greatest hits album All Singles Best achieves the sales of over three million copies, becoming the first album to do so in 7 years 10 months since Southern All Stars' 1998 album Umi no Yeah!! in 2002.
- May 19 – Namie Amuro receives the award for best selling Asian artist at the 2010 World Music Awards.
- May 21 – Kana Nishino's "Aitakute Aitakute" reaches #1 on the RIAJ Digital Track Chart, making this Nishino's fourth consecutive #1 song on the chart. Because of this, Nishino becomes the artist with most #1 songs on the chart, as well as becoming the artist with most weeks at #1 (with seven weeks in total).
- May 22 – Erika Sawajiri returns to the music scene, with a performance at the fashion and music event Girls Award 2010 held at the Yoyogi National Gymnasium. She had been on hiatus for two and a half years, due to the controversy around her comments at a press conference for the film Closed Note.
- May 25 – Boyband Arashi's single "Monster" sells 543,000 copies in its first week, making it the biggest selling first week of a single in 2010. The single beat out the sales of the group's previous single, "Troublemaker," by only 1,000 copies.
- May 25 – Exit Tunes Presents Vocalogenesis feat. Hatsune Miku becomes the first vocaloid album to top the Oricon weekly charts.
- May 28 – Rapper Sticky of the Japanese hip-hop group Scars was arrested for possession of 30 grams of cannabis, found at his home in Kawasaki.
- May 29 – The 9th MTV Video Music Awards Japan are held at the Yoyogi National Gymnasium. Exile's "Futatsu no Kuchibiru" won the award for the best video of 2009. Other major awards went to Shota Shimizu's "Utsukushii Hibi yo," Namie Amuro's "Fast Car" and Tohoshinki's "Share the World."

=== June ===
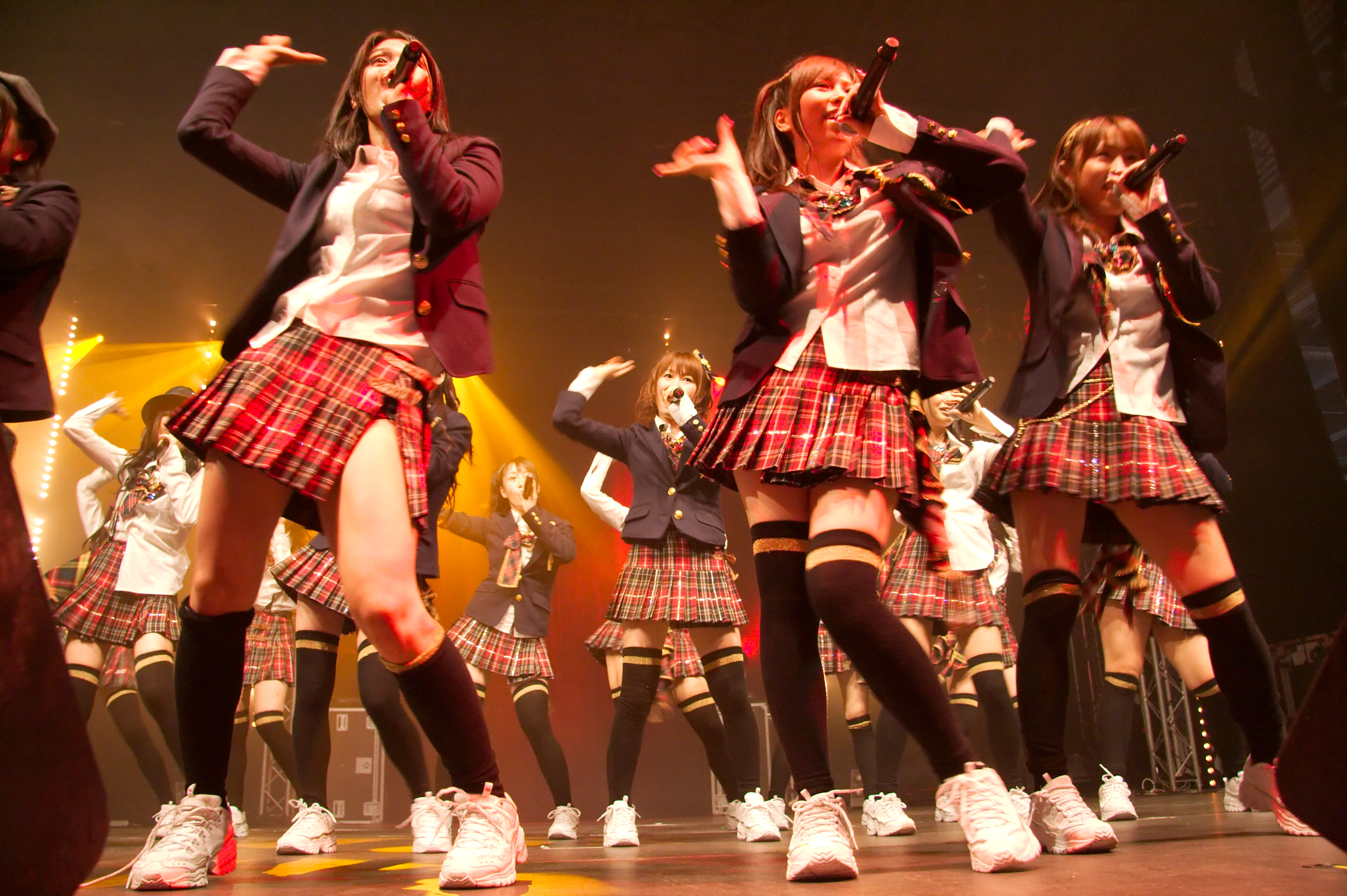
AKB48's "Ponytail to Chouchou" becomes the biggest female idol single since 2000.

- June 1 – Idol group AKB48's single "Ponytail to Chouchou" sells 513,000 copies in its first week, becoming the biggest first week for a female idol single since Morning Musume's "Ren'ai Revolution 21" in 2000, and the biggest first week for a female artist since Hikaru Utada's "Can You Keep a Secret?" in 2001.
- June 1 – Boyband Tohoshinki member Xiah Junsu's single "Xiah" sells 195,000 copies in its first week, becoming the biggest first week sales of the year by a solo artist.
- June 4 – July 13 – Visual kei metal band Versailles embark on their first world tour, with dates in South America and Europe. The band have previously performed single concerts in the US in 2008.
- June 10 – RIAJ certifies Hideaki Tokunaga's album Vocalist 4 as double platinum, and his album Vocalist (released September 2005) as a million selling album.
- June 13 – Misia performs her song "Maware Maware" from the 2010 FIFA World Cup official album Listen Up! The Official 2010 FIFA World Cup Album at the Nelson Mandela Square in Johannesburg, and also unveils a 3D music video for the song.
- June 13 – Surface disband at their final concert at the Tokyo International Forum.
- June 15 – Kaela Kimura reaches #1 on Oricon's single charts with her song "Ring a Ding Dong," making this the first time she has topped the single charts since she debuted in 2004.
- June 19–20 – Jin Akanishi, member of the boyband KAT-TUN, performed three concerts in Los Angeles as a part of his You & Jin solo tour. This is the first solo performance by a Johnny's artist in the US. Further concerts over the United States are planned for September and October. Consequently, Akanishi did not attend KAT-TUN's Asian tour.
- June 20 – Kaela Kimura's song "Ring a Ding Dong" is certified by the RIAJ for 1,000,000 ringtone downloads between its release date, May 26, and the end of May.
- June 25 – Ai Otsuka married RIP SLYME member SU. The announcement of the marriage had been released on her official website on June 26.
- June 28 – Otonamode played their final live with their current line-up. After this, vocalist/guitarist Keita Takahashi continued on as the band's lead, however with different members.

=== July ===
- July 1–4 – Many Japanese artists plan to perform at Anime Expo in Los Angeles, including AKB48 and RSP on July 1, May'n, Megumi Nakajima and I've singer Mell on July 2, Beni and rock band Sophia on July 3.
- July 1–4 – Many Japanese artists plan to perform at Japan Expo in Paris, including Doping Panda on July 1, C-Zone and Morning Musume on July 2, Vivid on both July 2 and 3, Long Shot Party on July 3, and Seikima-II and X Japan members Toshi and Yoshiki on July 4.
- July 15 – Daisuke Ochida, former vocalist of visual kei bands Kagerou and the studs dies at the age of 31.
- July 16–24 – Gackt plans to tour Europe for the first time in his career, with dates in England, France, Germany and Spain planned.
- July 30 – August 1 – The Fuji Rock Festival is planned to be held over three days.
- July 31 – August 28 – Johnny & Associates band KAT-TUN plans to tour Asia, with dates in South Korea and Taiwan scheduled. The band toured without band member Jin Akanishi.

=== August ===
- August 6–8 – The Rock in Japan Festival is planned to be held over three days, making it 10 years since the debut of the event.
- August 8 – X Japan intends to perform at the US Lollapalooza festival in Chicago.
- August 7–8 – The Summer Sonic Festival is planned to be held, making it 10 years since the event began.
- August 13–14 – The Rising Sun Rock Festival was be held.
- August 28–29 – Animelo Summer Live 2010 -evolution-

== Scheduled events ==
=== October ===
- October 1–31 – Nippon Columbia's month-long celebration of its centennial.
- October 1 – November 6 – Rock band Vamps (formed with Hyde of L'Arc-en-Ciel, K.A.Z of Oblivion Dust) toured the United States, Spain, France, China and Chile. This was be the band's third tour, and the second to be performed overseas (their Vamps Live 2009 tour reached the US and Taiwan).
- October 8–24 – Kokia plans to hold her fifth string of European concerts, with dates in Austria, England, Germany, France, Poland and Russia.

=== December ===
- December 30 – The 52nd Japan Record Award is planned.
- December 31 – Annual New Year's music events are planned, such as the 61st Kōhaku Uta Gassen song contest and the 8th Countdown Japan festival.

== Independent artists making major label debuts ==
- Emi Maria
- F.T. Island
- Galileo Galilei
- Kinoco Hotel (キノコホテル, Kinoko Hoteru)
- Momoiro Clover
- S/mileage
- Sug

== Artists resuming activities ==
- The Brilliant Green
- Def Tech
- Double
- Vivian Hsu
- Ketsumeishi
- Kuroyume
- SADS
- Tetsuya Komuro
- Love Psychedelico
- Kanae Matsumoto (as "Utahime Surprise" (歌姫☆サプライズ)
- One Ok Rock
- Erika Sawajiri
- Tetsuya (L'Arc-en-Ciel)
- Tina
- LUNA SEA

== Artists on hiatus ==
- Akina Nakamori
- Mika Nakashima
- Maki Ohguro
- Snowkel
- Tohoshinki
- Hikaru Utada

== Disbanding artists ==
- Rina Aiuchi
- Flame
- Fumido
- High and Mighty Color
- Maria
- Melon Kinenbi
- Surface
- Yura Yura Teikoku

== Top hits on record ==
Currently, there are four major charts for song popularity in Japan: Oricon singles charts, Soundscan singles charts, the Billboard Japan Hot 100 and RIAJ digital tracks. Oricon and Soundscan track sales of physical single releases, though Soundscan separates each version of the release (for example, CD+DVD and CD Only versions are tracked separately). The Japan Hot 100 tracks song popularity based on radio airplay and physical single sales data from Soundscan. The RIAJ digital chart tracks the most popular songs downloaded in their entirety from cellphones (Chaku-uta full). No chart exists that tallies PC downloads as of 2010, though the RIAJ certifies PC download releases.

=== Number-one hits ===
Artist	Title	Chart positions			Notes
Artist	Title	Oricon singles chart	Billboard Japan Hot 100	RIAJ digital tracks	Notes
AAA	"Aitai Riyū/Dream After Dream (Yume Kara Sameta Yume)"	1	13; 26	12; 29	
Aiko	"Modorenai Ashita"	1	1	–	
AKB48	"Beginner"	1	1	2	
AKB48	"Chance no Junban"	1	1	12	
AKB48	"Heavy Rotation"	1	1	1	RIAJ #1 for two weeks
AKB48	"Ponytail to Chouchou"	1	1	4	
AKB48	"Sakura no Shiori"	1	1	15	
Arashi	"Dear Snow"	1	1	–	
Arashi	"Hatenai Sora"	1	1	–	
Arashi	"Love Rainbow"	1	1	–	
Arashi	"Monster"	1	1	–	
Arashi	"To Be Free"	1	1	–	Billboard #1 for two weeks
Arashi	"Troublemaker"	1	1	–	Billboard #1 for two weeks
Bump of Chicken	"Happy"	1	1	–	
Bump of Chicken	"Mahō no Ryōri (Kimi Kara Kimi e)"	1	1	4	
Bump of Chicken	"Uchūhikōshi e no Tegami/Motorcycle"	1	1; 51	15; 40	
Exile	"I Wish for You"	2	2	1	
Exile	"Motto Tsuyoku"	1	1	1	Billboard #1 for two weeks, RIAJ #1 for three
Exile	"Victory"	1	1	6	Charted at #1 on Oricon albums chart, Billboard #1 for two weeks
Flumpool	"Kimi ni Todoke"	2	1	2	
Masaharu Fukuyama	"Hatsukoi"	2	3	1	Oricon/Billboard #1 in 2009, RIAJ #1 for two weeks – 1 in 2009
Masaharu Fukuyama	"Hotaru/Shōnen"	1	1; 91	2; 2	
Ayumi Hamasaki	"Crossroad"	1	3	4	
Ayumi Hamasaki	"L"	1	2	6; 23; 37	Triple A-side EP
Ayumi Hamasaki	"Moon/Blossom"	1	4	1; 9	
Ayumi Hamasaki	"You Were.../Ballad"	1	14	3; 36	
Hey! Say! JUMP	""Arigatō" (Sekai no Doko ni Ite mo)"	1	1	–	
Hey! Say! JUMP	"Hitomi no Screen"	1	1	–	
Hilcrhyme	"Daijōbu"	6	6	1	RIAJ #1 for three weeks
Hilcrhyme	"Loose Leaf"	7	9	1	RIAJ #1 for two weeks
Ho-kago Tea Time	"Go! Go! Maniac"	1	1	4	
Ikimono-gakari	"Arigatō"	2	1	2	
Koshi Inaba	"Okay"	1	1	–	
Juju	"Hello, Again (Mukashi Kara Aru Basho)"	15	19	1	My Little Lover cover
Juju	"Kono Yoru o Tomete yo"	10	12	1	RIAJ #1 for three weeks
Kanjani Eight	"Fuyu Koi" (Gift (White))	1	1	–	
Kanjani Eight	"Life (Me no Mae no Mukō e)"	1	1	–	
Kanjani Eight	"Wonderful World!!"	1	1	–	
Miliyah Kato	"Bye Bye"	8	4	1	
KAT-TUN	"Change Ur World"	1	1	–	
KAT-TUN	"Going!"	1	1	–	
KAT-TUN	"Love Yourself (Kimi ga Kirai na Kimi ga Suki)"	1	1	–	
Ketsumeishi	"Ofutari Summer"	3	3	1	
Ketsumeishi	"Sakura"	–	38	1	Oricon #1 in 2005, Billboard #28 in 2009
Kaela Kimura	"A Winter Fairy Is Melting a Snowman"	4	1	2	
Kaela Kimura	"Butterfly"	–	27	1	Digital single, Billboard #8 in 2009, RIAJ #1 for two weeks
Kaela Kimura	"Ring a Ding Dong"	1	2	1	
KinKi Kids	"Family (Hitotsu ni Naru Koto)"	1	1	–	
Kobukuro	"Ryūsei"	3	2	1	
Kumi Koda	"Gossip Candy"	4	11; 31	1; 44; 52; 45	Four A-side EP; Billboard positions refer to the single and "Lollipop" respectively
Kumi Koda	"Suki de, Suki de, Suki de/Anata Dake ga"	2	2	1; 5	
Toshinobu Kubota	"Love Rain (Koi no Ame)"	3	5	1	
Lecca feat. Kusuo	"Tsubomi"	13	8	1	
Nana Mizuki	"Phantom Minds"	1	3	14	
Monkey Majik	"Sakura"	19	1	27	
Moumoon	"Sunshine Girl"	10	4	1	
Mika Nakashima	"Always"	3	2	1	RIAJ #1 for two weeks
NEWS	"Fighting Man"	1	1	–	
NEWS	"Sakura Girl"	1	1	–	
Kana Nishino	"Aitakute Aitakute"	2	4	1	RIAJ #1 for two weeks
Kana Nishino	"Best Friend"	3	3	1	RIAJ #1 for three weeks
Kana Nishino	"If"	5	6	1	RIAJ #1 for three weeks
Kana Nishino	"Kimi tte"	3	3	1	RIAJ #1 for three weeks
NYC	"Yoku Asobi Yoku Manabe"	1	1	–	
NYC	"Yūki 100%"	1	1	–	
Rake	"Fly Away"	159	1	–	Billboard #1 for two weeks
The Rootless	"One Day"	3	4	1	
Fuyumi Sakamoto	"Mata Kimi ni Koishiteru/Asia no Kaizoku"	3	12; 16	1 –	RIAJ #1 for two weeks
Shota Shimizu x Miliyah Kato	"Forever Love"	4	3	1	RIAJ #1 for two weeks
Shōjo Jidai	"Gee"	2	2	1	
Sid	"Rain"	2	1	6	
SMAP	"This Is Love"	1	1	8	Billboard #1 for two weeks
Superfly	"Wildflower"	1	1	3	Charted at #1 on Oricon albums chart
Tackey & Tsubasa	"Ai wa Takaramono"	1	7	–	
Team Dragon from AKB48	"Kokoro no Hane"	1	2	8	
Tohoshinki	"Break Out!"	1	1	7	
Tohoshinki	"Toki o Tomete"	1	1	26	Re-cut single from Best Selection 2010
Tokio	"Haruka"	1	2	–	
Naoya Urata feat. Ayumi Hamasaki	"Dream On"	1	12	TBA	
Hikaru Utada	"Goodbye Happiness"	–	1	8	Promotional singles
Hikaru Utada	"Can't Wait 'Til Christmas"	–	2	1	Promotional singles
V6	"Only Dreaming"	1	3	–	
Watarirouka Hashiritai	"AkKanbe Bashi"	1	8	54	
Tomohisa Yamashita	"One in a Million"	1	1	–	
Yui	"Gloria"	1	1	2	
Yui	"To Mother"	1	2	4	
Yusuke	"Lion"	1	2	1	
"—" denotes that the song was not released in that format, or it did not chart. "TBA" denotes that the song has not been released yet in this format, at the time of writing.

=== Top 5 hits ===
Artist	Title	Chart positions			Notes
Artist	Title	Oricon singles chart	Billboard Japan Hot 100	RIAJ digital tracks	Notes
AAA	"Heart and Soul"	3	15	31	
AAA	"Makenai Kokoro"	3	5	10	
AAA	"Paradise"	5	8	20	
Mao Abe	"Itsu no Hi mo"	12	2	6	
Mao Abe	"Lonely"	22	5	19	
Acid Black Cherry	"Re:birth"	2	6	11	
Christina Aguilera	"Not Myself Tonight"	–	3	31	Promotional single
AI feat. Namie Amuro	"Fake"	8	5	4	
AI feat. Miliyah Kato	"Stronger"	26	30	4	
Aiko	"Beat"	–	4	–	Promotional single
Aiko	"Mukai Awase"	2	2	42	
Mio Akiyama (Yōko Hikasa)	"Seishun Vibration"	4	25	64	Image song for anime K-On!
Namie Amuro	"Break It/Get Myself Back"	3	16; 2	15; 5	
Aqua Timez	"Gravity 0"	5	4	15	
Asian Kung-Fu Generation	"Solanin"	3	2	2	
Azu feat. Love Love Love	"You & I"	55	38	3	
The Bawdies	"Just Be Cool"	8	5	–	
The Bawdies	"Hot Dog"	7	3	–	
Berryz Kobo	"Otakebi Boy Wao!"	3	12	87	
Justin Bieber feat. Ludacris	"Baby"	–	2	27	Digital single
Justin Bieber	"Somebody to Love/Never Say Never"	19	2; 9	–	
Big Bang	"Tell Me Goodbye"	5	16	15	
Breakerz	"Bunny Love"	4	36	–	
Breakerz	"Gekijō"	5	24	–	
The Brilliant Green	"Like Yesterday"	17	2	41	
Charice	"Pyramid"	–	4	33	
Chorus Japan	"Ne no Uta"	33	4	–	
Cocco	"Nirai Kanai"	20	4	–	
Taio Cruz	"Break Your Heart"	–	4	36	Digital single
Cute	"Campus Life (Umarete Kite Yokatta)"	5	26	–	
Cute	"Shock!"	5	19	–	
Miley Cyrus	"Party in the U.S.A."	–	4	36	Digital single
Jason Derülo	"Whatcha Say"	–	4	73	Digital single
Does	"Bakuchi Dancer"	3	6	2	
Dragon Ash	"Ambitious"	8	4	34	
Dreams Come True	"Lies, Lies."	4	5	15	
Dreams Come True	"Ikite Yuku no Desu"	5	3	17	
Dreams Come True	"Nee"	5	3	3	
Flow	"Sign"	4	14	8	
Flumpool	"Reboot (Akiramenai Uta)"	2	4	24	
Flumpool	"Zanzō"	3	7	5	
French Kiss	"Zutto Mae Kara"	5	5	91	
FripSide	"Future Gazer"	4	49	24	
FripSide	"Level 5 (Judgelight)"	4	22	7	
F.T. Island	"Flower Rock"	4	50	–	
Funky Monkey Babys	"Ato Hitotsu"	8	5	3	
Funky Monkey Babys	"Namida/Yume"	4	3	2; 12	
Funky Monkey Babys	"Taisetsu"	6	6	3	
Gackt	"Ever"	4	18	73	
Gackt	"Stay the Ride Alive"	3	79	82	
Garnet Crow	"Over Drive"	4	20	–	
The Gazette	"Pledge"	2	11	9	
The Gazette	"Shiver"	2	6	4	
Girls Dead Monster	"Little Braver"	2	15	–	
Girls Dead Monster	"Thousand Enemies"	4	19	–	
Girls Dead Monster starring Lisa	"Ichiban no Takaramono (Yui final ver.)"	3	7	TBA	
Girls Dead Monster starring Marina	"Last Song"	2	6	TBA	
Glay	"Precious"	2	3	30	
Golden Bomber	"Mata Kimi ni Bangō o Kikenakatta"	4	–	–	
Yuko Hara	"Kyōto Monogatari"	–	2	16	Promotional single
Motohiro Hata	"Ai"	5	5	29	
Megumi Hayashibara	"Shūketsu no Sadame"	6	58	5	
Kiyoshi Hikawa	"Nijiiro no Bayon"	3	5	–	
Kiyoshi Hikawa	"Shamisen Tabigarasu"	2	2	–	
Hilcrhyme	"Please Cry"	–	–	2	Single "Travel Machine" B-side
Hilcrhyme	"Shunkashūtō"	17	36	2	RIAJ #1 in 2009, Oricon #6/Billboard #2 in 2009
Kyosuke Himuro	"Bang the Beat"	3	2	34	
Ken Hirai	"Aishiteru"	9	12	2	
Ken Hirai	"Sing Forever"	7	5	29	
Yui Hirasawa (Aki Toyosaki)	"Oh My Guita!!"	5	26	45	Image song for anime K-On!
Ho-kago Tea Time	"Gohan wa Okazu"	3	6	10	
Ho-kago Tea Time	"Listen"	2	2	8	
Ho-kago Tea Time	"No, Thank You!"	2	3	6	
Ho-kago Tea Time	"Pure Pure Heart"	4	11	23	
Ho-kago Tea Time	"U & I"	–	–	3	Promotional single
Ho-kago Tea Time	"Utauyo!! Miracle"	3	4	4	
Home Made Kazoku	"Nukumori"	39	41	4	
Honey L Days	"Manazashi"	17	27	2	
HY	"366 Nichi"	–	–	4	Billboard #28 in 2008
Idoling!!!	"Eve"	5	27	TBA	
Aya Ikeda (C-Zone), Mayu Kudō	"Alright! HeartCatch PreCure!/HeartCatch Paradise"	3	80 –	49; 35	Split artist single for anime HeartCatch PreCure!
Ikimono-gakari	"Kimi ga Iru"	4	2	7	
Ikimono-gakari	"Nostalgia"	2	4	3	
Ikimono-gakari	"Yell"	12	12	4	Billboard/RIAJ #1 in 2009, Oricon #2 in 2009
Miki Imai x Kentarō Kobuchi with Tomoyasu Hotei + Shunsuke Kuroda	"Taiyō no Melody"	5	13	–	
Tsubasa Imai	"Backborn"	2	25	–	
Infinity 16 welcomez Wakadanna	"Aishiteiru"	24	6	3	
Infinity 16 welcomez Minmi & Kana Nishino	"Manatsu no Orion"	–	49	3	Promotional single
Naoto Inti Raymi	"Takaramono (Kono Koe ga Naku Naru Made)"	15	3	5	
Juliet	"Aki Love"	37	33	3	
Juju	"First Love"	–	–	5	Hikaru Utada cover, promotional single
Juju	"Sakura Ame"	20	8	3	
Kaibutsu-kun	"Yukai Tsukai Kaibutsu-kun"	2	2	–	
Kanjani Eight	"I Wish" (Gift (Red))	2	2	–	
Kanjani Eight	"Yuki o Kudasai" (Gift (Green))	3	–	–	
Kara	"Jumping"	5	4	3	
Kara	"Mister"	5	11	7	
Miliyah Kato	"Last Love"	13	40	2	
Miliyah Kato	"X.O.X.O."	–	87	2	Promotional single
Kesha	"Tik Tok"	–	3	30	Promotional single
Kesha	"We R Who We R"	–	5	23	Promotional single
Ketsumeishi	"Nakama"	3	2	4	
Alicia Keys	"Doesn't Mean Anything"	–	5	47	Digital single, Billboard #3 in 2009
KG duet with Azu	"Donna ni Hanarete mo"	81	43	4	
Kii Kitano	"Sakura Saku"	7	17	3	
Kobukuro	"Mikazuki"	–	4	36	Ayaka cover, promotional single
Kumi Koda	"Can We Go Back"	2	6	6	
Natsuko Kondo	"Real de Gomen..."	34	3	70	
Ikumi Kumagai	"Getsurenka"	36	4	20	
Mai Kuraki	"Eien Yori Nagaku"	4	6	–	
Mai Kuraki	"Summer Time Gone"	4	8	–	
Meisa Kuroki	"LOL!"	12	62	4	
Keisuke Kuwata	"Hontō wa Kowai Ai to Romance"	2	2	19	
Lady Gaga feat. Beyoncé Knowles	"Telephone"	–	21	5	Digital single
Adam Lambert	"For Your Entertainment"	–	2	62	Digital single
L'Arc-en-Ciel	"Bless"	2	2	9	
L'Arc-en-Ciel	"I Love Rock 'n' Roll"	–	–	5	Arrows cover, digital single
Avril Lavigne	"Alice"	–	4	14	Digital single
Lia, Aoi Tada	"My Soul, Your Beats!/Brave Song"	3	7 –	–	Split artist single for anime Angel Beats!
LGMonkees feat. Noa	"Grateful Days"	–	–	5	Dragon Ash cover, digital single
LGMonkees feat. Noa	"Life"	–	–	5	Digital single
LGYankees x LGMonkees x Noa	"Only Holy Story"	–	–	5	Digital single
Love	"Taisetsu na Kimochi"	–	–	2	Promotional single
Love	"Watashi Au Mono"	23	27	4	
Maika	"Never Cry"	14	4	89	
Maroon 5	"Misery"	–	4	–	Promotional single
Yumi Matsutoya	"Dance no Yō ni Dakiyosetai"	15	3	–	
Akina Minami no Super Mild Seven, Pabo	"Shiawase ni Narō/Koi"	5	60 –	– 42	Split artist single for variety show Quiz! Hexagon II
Miwa	"Don't Cry Anymore"	11	2	3	
Miwa	"Change"	8	12	4	
Nana Mizuki	"Silent Bible"	3	5	23	
Kaori Mizumori	"Matsushima Kikō"	2	11	–	
Momoiro Clover	"Iku ze! Kaitō Shōjo"	3	19	–	
Morning Musume	"Onna ga Medatte Naze Ikenai"	5	16	–	
Morning Musume	"Seishun Collection"	3	13	–	
Mr. Children	"Rock 'n' Roll wa Ikiteiru"	–	3	TBA	Promotional single
Negoto	"Loop"	–	3	–	Promotional single
Nightmare	"A:Fantasia"	5	28	92	
Nikiee	"Nikiee"	72	4	TBA	
Kana Nishino	"Love & Smile"	–	–	3	Digital download
Kana Nishino	"Love Is Blind"	–	–	3	Single "Aitakute Aitakute" B-side
Kana Nishino	"Motto..."	36	24	5	RIAJ #1 in 2009. Oricon #6/Billboard #3 in 2009
Kana Nishino	"One Way Love"	–	–	2	Single "Best Friend" B-side
No3b	"Lie"	5	10	41	
Kazumasa Oda	"Goodbye"	15	5	–	
Maki Ohguro	"Anything Goes!"	7	19	5	
Onna Lovely	"Onara Hazukashikunai yo"	2	4	–	
Daisuke Ono	"Netsuretsu Answer"	5	56	–	
Orianthi	"According to You"	–	3	43	Digital single
Owl City	"Fireflies"	–	3	–	Digital single
Perfume	"Fushizen na Girl/Natural ni Koishite"	2	2; 5	9; 7	
Perfume	"575"	–	–	4	Single "Voice" B-side
Perfume	"Nee"	2	2	11	
Perfume	"Voice"	2	2	6	
Porno Graffitti	"Kimi wa 100%"	2	3	–	
Porno Graffitti	"Hitomi no Oku wo Nozokasete"	4	2	–	
Queen & Elizabeth	"Love Wars"	4	18	45	
Quruli to Yūmin	"Shirt o Awaeba"	–	4	–	Released as a photobook
Quruli	"Mahō no Jūtan"	20	4	–	
Radwimps	"Keitai Denwa"	3	2	–	
Radwimps	"Manifesto"	2	3	–	
Remioromen	"Kachōfūgetsu"	–	5	28	Digital single
Russia (Yasuhiro Takato)	"Zimá"	4	–	–	Hetalia: Axis Powers character single
Kazuyoshi Saito	"Zutto Suki Datta"	8	12	4	
Maaya Sakamoto	"Down Town"	5	16	–	
Sakanaction	"Aruku Around"	3	4	38	
Sandaime J Soul Brothers	"Best Friend's Girl"	3	3	2	
Sandaime J Soul Brothers	"On Your Mark (Hikari no Kiseki)"	3	5	5	
Sata Andagi	"Yanbaru Kuina ga Tonda"	6	10	3	
Scandal	"Scandal Nanka Buttobase"	3	7	–	
Scandal	"Shunkan Sentimental"	7	17	2	
SDN48	"Gagaga"	3	5	31	
Seira	"Love Letter no Kawari ni Kono Uta o"	95	5	–	
Sekai no Owari	"Tenshi to Akuma/Fantasy"	8	5; 71	–	
Shota Shimizu	"Goodbye"	10	10	4	
Shota Shimizu	"Kimi ga Kurasu Machi"	12	33	5	
Shōjo Jidai	"Genie"	4	4	8	
Shōnan no Kaze	"Gachizakura"	8	11	2	
Sid	"Cosmetic"	3	5	17	
Sid	"Ranbu no Melody"	5	9	10	
Sid	"Sleep"	2	4	13	
SKE48	"Aozora Kataomoi"	3	47	75	
SKE48	"Gomen ne, Summer"	3	6	–	
SKE48	"1!2!3!4! Yoroshiku!"	2	6	52	
S/mileage	"Onaji Jikyū de Hataraku Tomodachi no Bijin Mama"	5	17	–	
S/mileage	"Yume Miru Jū Go Sai"	5	22	–	
Sonar Pocket	"Suki da yo. (Hyaku-kai no Kōkai)"	–	–	5	Digital single
Sound Horizon	"Ido e Itaru Mori e Itaru Ido"	2	9	–	
Spitz	"Shirokuma"	4	4	40	
Spitz	"Tsugumi"	4	6	35	
Sayuri Sugawara	"Sunao ni Narenakute"	18	15	2	
Sukima Switch	"Ice Cream Syndrome"	6	5	–	
Superfly	"Eyes on Me"	5	2	10	
Superfly	"Tamashii Revolution"	–	5	4	Digital single
Yu Takahashi	"Subarashiki Nichijō"	57	5	74	
Takamiy	"Aozora o Shinjiteiru ka?"	5	12	–	
Yukari Tamura	"My Wish My Love"	5	40	89	
Tee	"Baby I Love You"	22	2	7	
T.M.Revolution	"Naked Arms/Sword Summit"	3	4	13; 14	
T.M.Revolution	"Save the One, Save the All"	4	7	11	
Tokio	"Advance"	5	5	–	
T-Pistonz+KMC	"Katte Nakō ze!"	3	32	62	
Kana Uemura	"Toilet no Kamisama"	12	7	3	
Underworld	"Always Loved a Film"	–	5	–	Promotional single
Universe	"Haruiro"	27	2	19	
Uverworld	"Gold"	2	3	15	
Uverworld	"No. 1"	4	6	14	
Uverworld	"Qualia"	2	3	3	
Vamps	"Angel Trip"	4	19	81	
Vamps	"Memories"	4	20	TBA	
Vamps	"Devil Side"	2	9	57	
WaT	"Kimi ga Boku ni Kiss o Shita"	7	5	–	
Watarirouka Hashiritai	"Gyu"	2	7	68	
Watarirouka Hashiritai	"Seishun no Flag"	4	5	67	
Weaver	"Bokura no Eien"	–	11	5	Promotional single
W-inds	"Addicted to Love"	3	7	–	
Xiah Junsu	"Xiah"	2	4 – –	38; 46; 49	Triple A-side EP
Mari Yaguchi to Strawhat	"Kaze o Sagashite"	2	10	5	
Tatsuro Yamashita	"Kibō to Iu Na no Hikari"	9	3	–	
Tatsuro Yamashita	"Machi Monogatari"	13	4	63	
Yui	"Rain"	2	2	6	
Yuki	"Futari no Story"	4	9	17	
Yuki	"Ureshikutte Dakiau yo"	5	5	8	
Yusuke	"Hito"	4	9	4	
Yusuke	"Mitsubachi"	2	3	2	
Yuzu	"From"	2	2	TBA	
Yuzu	"Jiai e no Tabiji"	5	4	24	
Yuzu	"Sakurae/My Life"	2	2	21; 37	
Zebra Queen	"Namida (Kokoro Abaite)"	23	49	5	

== Deaths ==
January

- January 7 – Minami, 34, vocalist of D-Loop, prescription medicine misdosage.
- January 17 – Maki Asakawa, 68, jazz singer, heart failure.

February

- February 26 – Nujabes, 36, hip-hop track maker, car accident.

March

- March 27 – Hatsumi Shibata, 57, singer, acute heart failure.

May

- May 17 – Osamu Yoshioka, 76, lyricist, acute heart failure.

== See also ==
- 2010s in music
- 2010 in Japan
- 2010 in Japanese television
- List of Japanese films of 2010
