= List of Hot 100 number-one singles of 2010 (Japan) =

This is a list of number one singles on the Billboard Japan Hot 100 chart in Japan in 2010.

Date	Song	Artist
January 13	"Fly Away"	Rake
January 20	"Fly Away"	Rake
January 27	"Gloria"	Yui
February 3	"Break Out!"	Tohoshinki
February 10	"Modorenai Ashita"	Aiko
February 17	"Love Yourself (Kimi ga Kirai na Kimi ga Suki)"	KAT-TUN
February 24	"Sakura no Shiori"	AKB48
March 3	"Hitomi no Screen"	Hey! Say! JUMP
March 10	"Troublemaker"	Arashi
March 17	"Troublemaker"	Arashi
March 24	"Sakura"	Monkey Majik
March 31	"Toki o Tomete"	Tohoshinki
April 7	"Sakura Girl"	NEWS
April 14	"Yūki 100%"	NYC
April 21	"Happy"	Bump of Chicken
April 28	"Mahō no Ryōri (Kimi Kara Kimi e)"	Bump of Chicken
May 5	"Go! Go! Maniac"	Ho-kago Tea Time
May 12	"Arigatō"	Ikimono-gakari
May 19	"Going!"	KAT-TUN
May 26	"Monster"	Arashi
June 2	"Ponytail to Chouchou"	AKB48
June 9	"Rain"	Sid
June 16	"Victory"	Exile
June 23	"Victory"	Exile
June 30	"Okay"	Koshi Inaba
July 7	"Wonderful World!!"	Kanjani Eight
July 14	"To Be Free"	Arashi
July 21	"To Be Free"	Arashi
July 28	"This Is Love"	SMAP
August 4	"One in a Million"	Tomohisa Yamashita
August 11	"This Is Love"	SMAP
August 18	"Hotaru"	Masaharu Fukuyama
August 25	"Heavy Rotation"	AKB48
September 1	"Life (Me no Mae no Mukō e)"	Kanjani Eight
September 8	"Wildflower"	Superfly
September 15	"Love Rainbow"	Arashi
September 22	"Motto Tsuyoku"	Exile
September 29	"Motto Tsuyoku"	Exile
October 6	"Kimi ni Todoke"	Flumpool
October 13	"Dear Snow"	Arashi
October 20	"Uchūhikōshi e no Tegami"	Bump of Chicken
October 27	"Yoku Asobi Yoku Manabe"	NYC
November 3	"Beginner"	AKB48
November 10	"Fighting Man"	NEWS
November 17	"Hatenai Sora"	Arashi
November 24	"Change Ur World"	KAT-TUN
December 1	"Goodbye Happiness"	Hikaru Utada
December 8	"Family (Hitotsu ni Naru Koto)"	KinKi Kids
December 15	"Chance no Junban"	AKB48
December 22	"Arigatō (Sekai no Doko ni Ite mo)"	Hey! Say! JUMP
December 29	"A winter fairy is melting a snowman"	Kaela Kimura
