= List of Oricon number-one singles of 2010 =

The highest-selling singles in Japan are ranked in the Oricon Weekly Chart, which is published by Oricon Style magazine. The data are compiled by Oricon based on each singles' weekly physical sales. In 2010 25 singles reached number-one.

== Chart history ==
| Issue Date | Singles | Artist(s) | Reference(s) |
|---|---|---|---|
| January 4 | "Gift (White)" | Kanjani Eight | |
| January 18 | "You Were.../Ballad" | Ayumi Hamasaki | |
| January 25 | "Phantom Minds" | Nana Mizuki | |
| February 1 | "Gloria" | Yui | |
| February 8 | "Break Out!" | TVXQ | |
| February 15 | "Modorenai Ashita" (戻れない明日; Tomorrow When I Can't Come Back) | Aiko | |
| February 22 | "Love Yourself (Kimi ga Kirai na Kimi ga Suki)" | KAT-TUN | |
| March 1 | "Sakura no Shiori" | AKB48 | |
| March 8 | "Hitomi no Screen" | Hey! Say! JUMP | |
| March 15 | "Troublemaker" | Arashi | |
| March 22 | "Lion" (ライオン, Raion) | Yusuke | |
| March 29 | "AkKanbe Bashi" (アッカンベー橋; Akkanbē Bridge) | Watarirouka Hashiritai | |
| April 5 | "Toki o Tomete" | TVXQ | |
| April 12 | "Sakura Girl" (さくらガール, Sakura Gāru; Cherry Blossom Girl) | NEWS | |
| April 19 | "Yūki 100%" | NYC | |
| April 26 | "Happy" | Bump of Chicken | |
| May 3 | "Mahō no Ryōri (Kimi Kara Kimi e)" | Bump of Chicken | |
| May 10 | "Go! Go! Maniac" | Ho-kago Tea Time | |
| May 17 | "Aitai Riyū/Dream After Dream (Yume Kara Sameta Yume)" | AAA | |
| May 24 | "Going!" | KAT-TUN | |
| May 31 | "Monster" | Arashi | |
| June 7 | "Ponytail to Chouchou" | AKB48 | |
| June 14 | "To Mother" | Yui | |
| June 21 | "Ring a Ding Dong" | Kaela Kimura | |
| June 28 | "Haruka" | Tokio | |
| July 5 | "Okay" | Koshi Inaba | |
| July 12 | "Wonderful World!!" | Kanjani Eight | |
| July 19 | "To Be Free" | Arashi | |
| July 26 | "Moon/Blossom" | Ayumi Hamasaki | |
| August 2 | "Kokoro no Hane" (心の羽根; Wings of the Heart) | Team Dragon From AKB48 | |
| August 9 | "One in a Million" | Tomohisa Yamashita | |
| August 16 | "This Is Love" | SMAP | |
| August 23 | "Hotaru/Shōnen" | Masaharu Fukuyama | |
| August 30 | "Heavy Rotation" | AKB48 | |
| September 6 | "Life (Me no Mae no Mukou e)" | Kanjani Eight | |
| September 13 | "Only Dreaming/Catch" | V6 | |
| September 20 | "Love Rainbow" | Arashi | |
| September 27 | "Motto Tsuyoku" (もっと強く; Stronger) | Exile | |
| October 4 | "Crossroad" | Ayumi Hamasaki | |
| October 11 | "L" | Ayumi Hamasaki | |
| October 18 | "Dear Snow" | Arashi | |
| October 25 | "Uchūhikōshi e no Tegami/Motorcycle" (宇宙飛行士への手紙/モーターサイクル; Letter to Astronaut/Mōtāsaikuru) | Bump of Chicken | |
| November 1 | "Yoku Asobi Yoku Manabe" (よく遊びよく学べ; Lots of Play, Lots of Study) | NYC | |
| November 8 | "Beginner" | AKB48 | |
| November 15 | "Fighting Man" | NEWS | |
| November 22 | "Hatenai Sora" | Arashi | |
| November 29 | "Change Ur World" | KAT-TUN | |
| December 6 | "Ai wa Takaramono" (愛はタカラモノ; Love Is Treasure) | Tackey & Tsubasa | |
| December 13 | "Family (Hitotsu ni Naru Koto)" (Family ～ひとつになること; Family (To Become One)) | KinKi Kids | |
| December 20 | "Chance no Junban" | AKB48 | |
| December 27 | "Arigatō (Sekai no Doko ni Ite mo)" | Hey! Say! JUMP | |
