= List of artists who reached number one on the Japan Hot 100 =

This is a list of recording artists who have reached number one on the Billboard Japan Hot 100 chart. Billboard Japan began ranking the Japanese music market on the week ending January 21, 2008.

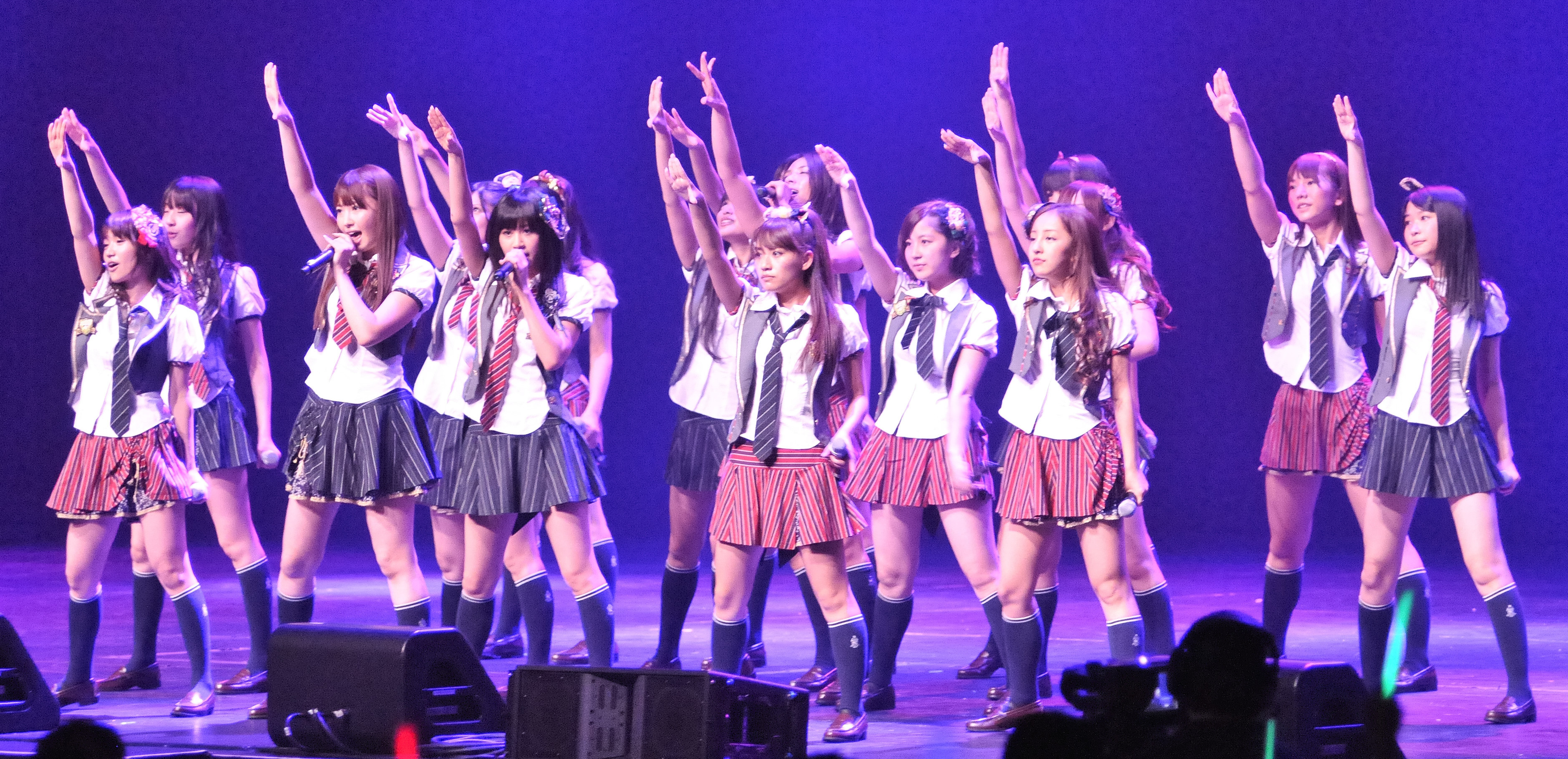
AKB48 hold the record for the most number-ones songs and by group with 44.

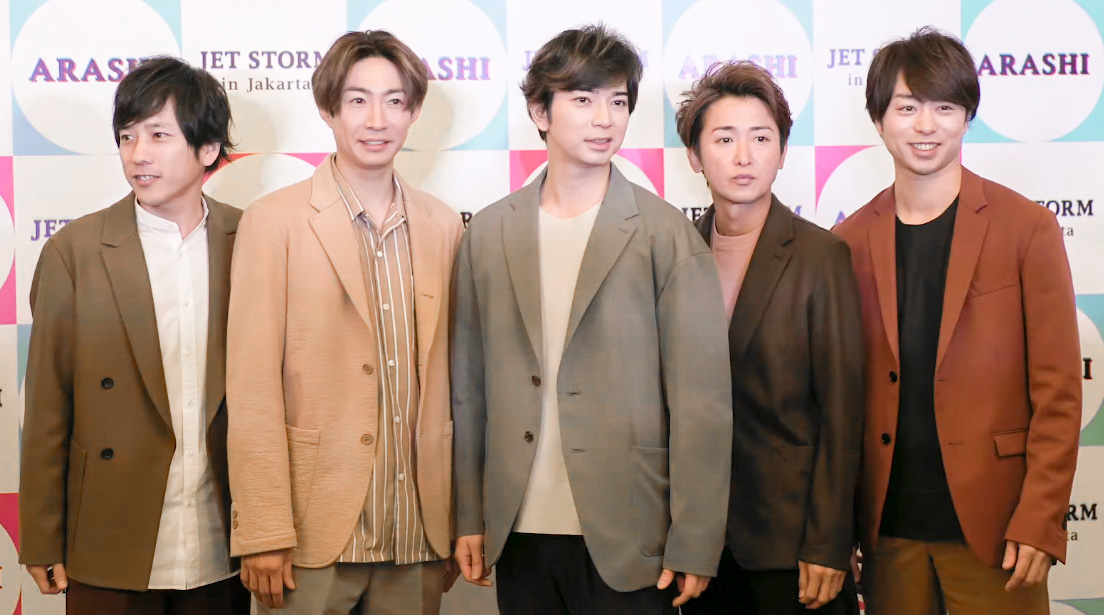
Arashi hold the record for the most number-ones songs by a male group with 38.

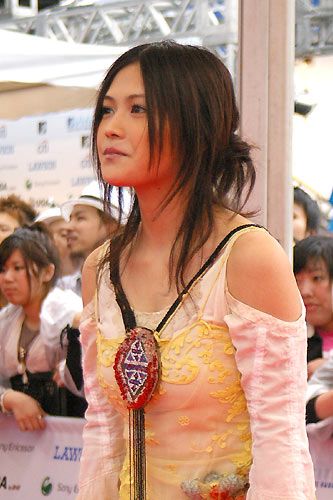
Yui (pictured) holds the record for the most number-one songs by a female solo artist with 4 while Kenshi Yonezu has the most by a male artist with 11.

- All acts are listed alphabetically.
- Solo artists are alphabetized by last name, groups by group name excluding "A", "An" and "The".
- Each act's total of number one Hot 100 hits is shown after their name.
- All artists who are mentioned in song credits are listed here; this includes one-time pairings of otherwise solo artists and those appearing as "featured" (for example, for "It's All Love!", both Kumi Koda and Misono receive a mention each).
- Artists associated with a group who reached number one, yet have their own solo page in Wikipedia are not listed here, unless they hit number one as a solo artist.
- Artists are listed by their most common musical stage name (for example, Tsuyoshi Domoto, not Endlicheri Endlicheri/244 Endli-x/Tsuyoshi).
- Artists currently without Wikipedia pages have their corresponding Japanese Wikipedia pages linked. If the artist has a non-Roman script name, this is listed as well.

== 0–9 ==
- 2PM (3)
- μ's (2)

== A ==
- &Team (1)
- Ado (3)
- Aimer (1)
- Ae! Group (2)
- AK-69 (1)
- Aimyon (1)
- AKB48 (44)
- Mao Abe (1)
- Aiko (2)
- Jin Akanishi (2)
- Angela Aki (1)
- Namie Amuro (3)
- Eir Aoi (1)
- Thelma Aoyama (1)
- Aqua Timez (1)
- Yui Aragaki (2)
- Arashi (38)
- Ateez (1)

== B ==
- Back Number (7)
- Be First (12)
- Bish (1)
- BoyNextDoor (1)
- Boys and Men (3)
- BSS (1)
- BTOB (1)
- BTS (6)
- Bullet Train (2)
- Bump of Chicken (2)
- B'z (6)

== C ==
- The Cinderella Project (1)
- Creepy Nuts (2)
- Cutie Street (1)

== D ==
- Daoko (1)
- Desiigner (1)
- Koichi Domoto (2)
- Tsuyoshi Domoto (3)
- Dreams Come True (2)

== E ==
- Ebidan (1)
- Eightranger (1)
- Eito (1)
- Enhypen (1)
- Exile (5)
- Exo (1)

== F ==
- Flumpool (1)
- French Kiss (1)
- Fruits Zipper (1)
- Masaharu Fukuyama (7)
- Fuzzy Control (1)

== G ==
- Lady Gaga (1)
- Generations from Exile Tribe (2)
- Genin wa Jibun ni Aru (1)
- Girls' Generation (3)
- Good Morning America (1)
- Got7 (2)
- Glay (1)
- Greeeen (3)

== H ==
- Ayumi Hamasaki (2)
- Hana (3)
- Yuko Hara (1)
- Hello! Project All Stars (1)
- Hey! Say! JUMP (30)
- Hinatazaka46 (9)
- Hi-Standard (1)
- Ken Hirai (1)
- HKT48 (10)
- Ho-kago Tea Time (1)
- Gen Hoshino (5)

== I ==
- Ikimono-gakari (2)
- iKon (1)
- Koshi Inaba (2)
- INI (7)
- Tomomi Itano (1)
- Iz*One (2)

== J ==
- JO1 (8)
- Jay'ed (1)
- Jejung (1)
- Ji Blue (1)
- Johnny's West (11)
- Juju (1)

== K ==
- Kazuya Kamenashi (1)
- Kame to Yamapi (1)
- Kanjani Eight (33)
- Kara (2)
- Miliyah Kato (1)
- KAT-TUN (19)
- KEN☆Tackey (1)
- Ketsumeishi (1)
- Keyakizaka46 (8) renamed to Sakurazaka46 since 21 September 2020
- King Gnu (3)
- King & Prince (16)
- KinKi Kids (14)
- Shō Kiryūin (1)
- Kis-My-Ft2 (27)
- Ko1keyz (1)
- Kobukuro (2)
- Koda Kumi (2)
- Keisuke Kuwata (1)

== L ==
- L'Arc-en-Ciel (1)
- Lands (1)
- Last Idol (1)
- Leo Ieiri (1)
- Leona Lewis (1)
- Le Sserafim (1)
- Link Horizon (1)
- =Love (3)
- LiSA (2)

== M ==
- Atsuko Maeda (3)
- Bruno Mars (1)
- Mazzel (1)
- Maximum the Hormone (1)
- ≠Me (1)
- Me:I (1)
- Mika (1)
- Milk (2)
- Misono (1)
- Nana Mizuki (1)
- The Monsters (1)
- Momoiro Clover Z (1)
- Monkey Majik (1)
- Morning Musume (2)
- Mr. Children (4)
- Mrs. Green Apple (6)

== N ==
- Tsuyoshi Nagabuchi (1)
- Naniwa Danshi (4)
- NEWS (14)
- NGT48 (2)
- Matsuri Nine (1)
- Kana Nishino (2)
- NiziU (4)
- NMB48 (16)
- Nogizaka46 (33)
- Not Yet (3)
- Number_i (7)
- NYC (1)

== O ==
- Official Hige Dandism (4)
- One n' Only (1)

== P ==
- Kyary Pamyu Pamyu (1)
- Perfume (2)
- Pikotaro (1)
- Plave (1)
- Porno Graffitti (1)

== R ==
- Radwimps (2)
- Rake (1)
- The Rampage from Exile Tribe (1)
- Naoto Inti Raymi (1)
- Remioromen (1)
- Rosé (1)

== S ==
- Ryuichi Sakamoto (1)
- Sakanaction (2)
- Sakurazaka46 (11) formerly called Keyakizaka46 prior 21 September 2020
- Sandaime J Soul Brothers from Exile Tribe (7)
- Rino Sashihara (1)
- Sekai no Owari (5)
- Seventeen (2)
- Sexy Zone (13)
- Subaru Shibutani (1)
- Shota Shimizu (1)
- Shuchishin (2)
- Sid (1)
- SixTones (8)
- SKE48 (21)
- SMAP (4)
- Snow Man (15)
- SoulJa (1)
- Southern All Stars (1)
- ST☆RISH (1)
- STU48 (5)
- Superfly (1)

== T ==
- T.M.Revolution (1)
- T-ara (1)
- Minami Takahashi (1)
- Tegomass (2)
- Aoi Teshima (1)
- Timelesz (1)
- Tokendanshi Formation of Mihotose (1)
- Tokyo Jihen (1)
- Tomorrow X Together (1)
- Travis Japan (2)
- Treasure (1)
- Tuki (1)
- Tohoshinki (8)
- Twenty★Twenty (1)
- Twice (5)
- TWS (2)

== U ==
- Kana Uemura (1)
- Unicorn (1)
- Unison Square Garden (1)
- Hikaru Utada (3)
- Uverworld (1)

== V ==
- V6 (4)

== W ==
- The Wanted (1)

== Y ==
- Ryosuke Yamada (1)
- Tomohisa Yamashita (2)
- Yoasobi (2)
- Kenshi Yonezu (11)
- Lee Young-ji (1)
- Yuchun (1)
- Yui (4)
- Yusuke (1)
- Yuzu (2)
