= Hyakuman-kai no "I Love You" =

2011 Rake single

Single by Rake

from the album First Sight
- Language: Japanese
- Released: March 9, 2011
- Genre: J-Pop
- Label: Ariola Japan
- Songwriter: Rake

Rake singles chronology
"Sekai wa Kyō mo Bokura o Nosete Mawaru" (2010)	"Hyakuman-kai no "I Love You"" (2011)	"Futari Hitotsu" (2012)

"Hyakuman-kai no 'I Love You'" (100万回の「I love you」; lit. '1 million times "I Love You"') is a song by the Japanese singer Rake. It was released on March 9, 2011. The song is a popular song to use when confessing in Japan and spawned an urban legend.

The song was first released as a ringtone on November 9, 2010, and as Rake's third single on March 9, 2011. The song was later included in his first album First Sight. Rake said that the song had been written six years before. After the 2011 Tōhoku earthquake and tsunami, which damaged his home city of Sendai, he thought he might not be able to continue his music career, but the song encouraged him to continue.

According to Rake, he came up with the guitar phrase first and then worked out the chorus by adding simple words to the song, concluding that the lyrics were "born inside [him]". He wanted everyone to be able to sing along to the song, and for it "to touch [their] heart easily". He thought about adjusting the lyric "hugging someone stronger but gentler" from the chorus, which he wanted to read "hugged someone stronger and tighter", but he wished to convey gentleness. Because he wanted people to smile at the song, he placed importance on the tempo and groove by making the song feel fast-paced and exhilarating.

The song gained popularity when it was used in a Yokohama Tire commercial. It ranked first on the USEN J-POP general chart in May 2011 and later become the first song in the chart's history to be in the top 30 for 24 consecutive weeks. The song was on the Recochoku's Top 10 Weekly Ranking for nine consecutive weeks. It charted on Oricon's weekly chart 29 times.

The song has been used as a "confession song" in Japan, and spawned an urban legend that "having the song as the ringtone of your phone will make your romance wishes come true". After the 2011 Tōhoku earthquake and tsunami, some people use the song to cope with the tragedy; many couples from Sendai request Rake to perform the song at their wedding.

== Chart ==
Weekly chart performance for "Hyakuman-kai no 'I Love You'"
Charts	Peak position
Japan CD (Oricon)	25
Japan Hot 100 (Billboard Japan)	27
