= My Girl (Arashi song) =

- CD cover

Single by Arashi

from the album Boku no Miteiru Fūkei
- B-side: "Tokei Jikake no Umbrella"; "Super Fresh"
- Released: November 11, 2009
- Recorded: 2009
- Genre: Pop
- Label: J Storm
- Songwriter(s): Wonderland

Arashi singles chronology
"Everything" (2009)	"My Girl" (2009)	"Troublemaker" (2010)

"My Girl" (マイガール, Mai Gāru) is a song recorded by Japanese boy band Arashi. It was released on November 11, 2009 through their record label J Storm. "My Girl" was used as the opening theme song for the television drama of the same name which stars Arashi member, Masaki Aiba. "My Girl" was released as a CD single in two formats: a regular edition and a limited edition. The former comes with two B-sides and the instrumental of all the songs, while the latter comes with the B-side "Tokei Jikake no Umbrella" (時計じかけのアンブレラ, Clockwork Umbrella) and a DVD.

== Background and release ==
On October 6, 2009, it was announced that Arashi would be singing the opening theme song for the television drama My Girl, which stars member Masaki Aiba. It was released in two formats: a regular and limited edition. Included in the regular edition was the title track and two B-sides, "Tokei Jikake no Umbrella" (時計じかけのアンブレラ, Clockwork Umbrella) and "Super Fresh" (スーパーフレッシュ, Sūpā Furesshu). Instrumentals for all three tracks were also included. The limited edition included "My Girl" and "Tokei Jikake no Umbrella" and came packaged with a DVD, which contains the promotional video for "My Girl" and the making-of the promotional video. The b-side "Tokei Jikake no Umbrella" was used as the theme song for the mini drama 0 Gōshitsu no Kyaku (0号室の客, Guest in Room 0), which stars various talents from Johnny & Associates.

== Music video ==
Shot by Yasuyuki Yamaguchi (山口 保幸, Yamaguchi Yasuyuki) in a drama-like setting, the music video opens up to the front of the Maiga (舞駕) family household and Saburō (三郎, lit. Third Son) (Masaki Aiba) removing the family nameplate from its place next to the front door while the bickering of his brothers can be heard from the inside.

At the dining table, Jirō (二郎, lit. Second Son) (Sho Sakurai) and Gorō (五郎, lit. Fifth Son) (Jun Matsumoto) are looking at a floor plan. Jirō writes his name in the space of the biggest room, but Gorō crosses Jirō's name out and puts his name instead. They continue to fight for the room until Shirō (四郎, lit. Fourth Son) (Kazunari Ninomiya) takes the marker from them and writes his name in the space of the smallest room, puzzling the both of them.

While everyone else continues to pack, Ichirō (一郎, lit. First Son) (Satoshi Ohno) picks up a picture frame with their mother's photo and carefully puts it into a box. Saburō looks through a photo album and finds a letter from their mother addressed to her sons at the very back, saying that she will be watching over them from the house no matter where they go in the future. He shows the letter to his brothers; Ichirō then takes the floor plan and rips it up.

The scene shifts from a living room full of boxes to a clean living room with everything back in its place. Gorō sends text message to their father, telling him that they will not be moving out of the house in order to stay with their mother. Shirō puts the picture frame of their mother back, and Saburō reattaches the family nameplate, now including the name Hanako (花子) next to theirs.

== Chart performance ==
On the issue date of October 26, 2009, the song, "My Girl" debuted on the Billboard Japan Hot 100 chart at number fifty-one. On its fifth week on the chart, the song jumped from number forty-one to number-one during the week of November 28, 2009. On the day of its release the single debuted at number one on the Oricon daily singles chart by selling about 178,000 copies on the first day. On the November 23 issue date, the single debuted atop the Oricon weekly chart selling an estimate of 432,000 copies in its first week, becoming their fourth number-one single of the year. "My Girl" is also the third single of 2009 to open with high sales in its first week, after Arashi's "Ashita no Kioku/Crazy Moon: Kimi wa Muteki" and "Believe/Kumorinochi, Kaisei" respectively.

The single is certified Double Platinum by the Recording Industry Association of Japan (RIAJ) for shipment of 500,000 copies.

== Track listing ==
Regular edition
No.	Title	Lyrics	Music	Arrangement	Length
1.	"My Girl"	Wonderland	Shinya Tada	Naoko-T	4:47
2.	"Tokei Jikake no Umbrella"	Sean-D; Sho Sakurai	Fredrik Hult; Mattman & Robin	Hisashi Nawata; Hult; Mattman & Robin	3:54
3.	"Super Fresh"	Shigeo; Shun	Shigeo	Shigeo	4:01
4.	"My Girl" (Instrumental)	Wonderland	Tada	Naoko-T	4:47
5.	"Tokei Jikake no Umbrella" (Instrumental)	Sean-D; Sakurai	Hult; Mattman & Robin	Nawata; Hult; Mattman & Robin	3:54
6.	"Super Fresh" (Instrumental)	Shigeo; Shun	Shigeo	Shigeo	3:57
Total length:					25:20

Limited edition
No.	Title	Lyrics	Music	Arrangement	Length
1.	"My Girl"	Wonderland	Shinya Tada	Naoko-T	4:47
2.	"Tokei Jikake no Umbrella"	Sean-D; Sakurai	Hult; Mattman & Robin	Nawata; Hult; Mattman & Robin	3:52
Total length:					8:39

Limited edition – DVD
No.	Title	Length
1.	"My Girl" (PV)
2.	"My Girl" (Making-of)

== Charts and certifications ==
=== Weekly charts ===
Chart (2009)	Peak position
Japan (Oricon Singles Chart)	1
Japan (Japan Hot 100)	1

=== Year-end charts ===
Chart (2009)	Peak position
Japan (Oricon Singles Chart)	3

=== Certifications ===
Region	Certification	Certified units/sales
Japan (RIAJ)	2× Platinum	562,000

== Release history ==
Release history and formats for "My Girl"
Region	Date	Format	Distributor
Japan	November 11, 2009	CD single (JACA-5188); CD+DVD (JACA-5186)	J Storm
Taiwan	November 27, 2009	CD single (JAJSG27024); CD+DVD (JAJSG27024/A)	Avex Taiwan
South Korea	November 30, 2009	CD single (SMJTCD325); CD+DVD (SMJTCD324B)	SM Entertainment
Hong Kong	December 4, 2009	CD single CD+DVD	Avex Asia
