= Everything (Arashi song) =

Single by Arashi

from the album Boku no Miteiru Fūkei
- B-side: "Season"
- Released: July 1, 2009
- Recorded: 2009
- Genre: Pop
- Label: J Storm
- Songwriters: 100+; Shingo Asari

Arashi singles chronology
"Ashita no Kioku/Crazy Moon (Kimi wa Muteki)" (2009)	"Everything" (2009)	"My Girl" (2009)

"Everything" is a song recorded by Japanese pop boy band Arashi. It was released on July 1, 2009, through their record label J Storm. "Everything" was used as the theme song for the au by KDDI commercials, featuring Arashi as the endorsers. It was released as a CD single in two formats: a regular edition and a limited edition. While both editions comes with the B-side song "Season", the former comes with the instrumental of all the songs, while the latter comes a DVD.

== Chart performance ==
The single sold over 340,000 copies in its first week, topping the Oricon weekly singles chart. Until the release of the group's twenty-eighth single "My Girl", "Everything" held the third highest position for first-week sales for singles of 2009. By selling a total of 423,004 copies by the end of 2009, "Everything" is officially the fifth best-selling single of 2009 in Japan.

The single is certified Platinum by the Recording Industry Association of Japan (RIAJ) for a shipment of 250,000 copies in Japan.

== Track listing ==
Regular edition
No.	Title	Lyrics	Music	Arrangement	Length
1.	"Everything"	100+	Shingo Asari	ISB	4:03
2.	"Season"	Youth Case	Youth Case	Tomoki Ishizuka	4:39
3.	"Everything" (Instrumental)	100+	Asari	ISB	4:03
4.	"Season" (Instrumental)	Youth Case	Youth Case	Ishizuka	4:35
Total length:					17:20

Limited edition
No.	Title	Lyrics	Music	Arrangement	Length
1.	"Everything"	100+	Asari	ISB	4:03
2.	"Season"	Youth Case	Youth Case	Ishizuka	4:35
Total length:					8:38

Limited edition – DVD
No.	Title	Length
1.	"Everything" (Music video)

== Charts and certifications ==
=== Weekly charts ===
Chart (2009)	Peak position
Japan (Oricon Singles Chart)	1
Japan (Japan Hot 100)	1

=== Year-end charts ===
Chart (2009)	Peak position
Japan (Oricon Singles Chart)	5

=== Certifications ===
Region	Certification	Certified units/sales
Japan (RIAJ)	Platinum	434,000

== Release history ==
Region	Date	Format	Distributor
Japan	July 1, 2009	CD single (JACA-5177); CD+DVD (JACA-5175)	J Storm
South Korea	July 15, 2009	CD single (SMJTCD312); CD+DVD (SMJTCD324B)	SM Entertainment
Taiwan	July 17, 2009	CD single (JAJSG27023); CD+DVD (JAJSG27023/A)	Avex Taiwan
Hong Kong	July 22, 2009	CD single CD+DVD	Avex Asia
