= Beautiful World (Arashi album) =

Studio album by Arashi
- Released: July 6, 2011
- Recorded: 2010–2011
- Studio: Bunkamura Studio, Japan; Victor Studio, Japan; Planet Kingdom, Japan
- Genre: Pop, R&B
- Length: 75:31
- Language: Japanese, English
- Label: J Storm

Arashi chronology
Boku no Miteiru Fūkei (2010)	Beautiful World (2011)	Ura Ara Mania (2012)

Singles from Beautiful World
- 1. "To Be Free" Released: July 7, 2010; 2. "Love Rainbow" Released: September 8, 2010; 3. "Dear Snow" Released: October 21, 2010; 4. "Hatenai Sora" Released: November 10, 2010; 5. "Lotus" Released: February 23, 2011

Beautiful World is the tenth studio album of the Japanese boy band Arashi. The album was released on July 6, 2011, in Japan under their record label J Storm in two editions: a limited-edition version with a 48-page booklet and a regular CD version with a 32-page booklet. The album debuted at number-one on the Oricon weekly album chart, selling 631,000 copies, making it their third consecutive album to reach sales of more than half a million copies. As of December 2011, the album has sold more than a million copies. According to Oricon, Beautiful World is the best-selling album of 2011 in Japan. It was released digitally on February 7, 2020.

== Album information ==
Both the first press and regular versions contain eighteen tracks. On November 28, 2011, a limited edition of the album was released exclusively by the shopping site "7-net". It consists of a bonus track Energy Song ~Zekkou chou chou (エナジーソング～絶好調超!!!!～), composed by member Kazunari Ninomiya and lyrics penned by the group.

=== Songs ===
"Beautiful World" includes five of the group's previously released singles: "To be free", "Love Rainbow", "Dear Snow", "Hatenai Sora" and "Lotus". "To be free" was used as the song for Mistuya Cider commercial with member Sho Sakurai as the endorser."Love Rainbow" was the theme song for the drama Natsu no Koi wa Nijiiro ni Kagayaku (夏の恋は虹色に輝く, lit. Summer Romance Shines in Rainbow Colours) starring member Jun Matsumoto. "Dear Snow" and "Hatenai Sora" were used as theme songs for the movie "Ōoku: The Inner Chambers" and drama Freeter, Ie o Kau. (フリーター、家を買う。, lit. Part-time Worker Buys a House) respectively, starring member Kazunari Ninomiya. "Lotus" was used as theme song for Bartender (バーテンダー) starring member Masaki Aiba.

"Tooku Made" was used as the theme song for a Japan Airlines commercial starring the group.

== Promotion ==
It was announced on July 24, 2011, that Japan Airlines will use two Boeing 777-200 bearing both the images of the members of Arashi and the words "ARASHI Beautiful World". The planes titled JAL Arashi JET (ＪＡＬ嵐ＪＥＴ) will be used for domestic flights, and the album with specially designed in-flight covers will be available, from July 25, 2011, to January 27, 2012. This marks the group's second time to have their images featured on an aircraft of the same airline.

== Track listing ==
Beautiful World track listing
No.	Title	Lyrics	Music	Arrangement	Length
1.	"Rock This"	Sho Sakurai; 100+	Dele Ladimeji; Paul Boddy	Taku Yoshioka	3:37
2.	"Mada Minu Sekai e" (まだ見ぬ世界へ)	Sakurai; Soluna	IiiSAK; R.P.P.	IiiSAK; Yoshioka	4:06
3.	"Love Rainbow"	Furaha; Octobar	IiSAK; Dyce Taylor	Ha-j	4:40
4.	"Always"	100+	Taylor; Andreas Johansson	Youwhich	4:02
5.	"Shake It!" (Jun Matsumoto solo)	The Sendai Sepia	The Sendai Sepia	Yoshioka	3:36
6.	"Niji no Kakera (No Rain, No Rainbow)" (虹のカケラ～no rain, no rainbow～)	Osami; Octobar	Carl Utbult; Chris Meyer; Taisho	Tomoki Ishizuka	3:53
7.	"Dear Snow"	Iori; Ishu	Kōsuke Ōshima	Sachiko Miyano; Yoshioka	4:44
8.	"Hung Up On" (Satoshi Ohno solo)	Sakurai; Iori	Ōshima	Ōshima	3:54
9.	"Joy"	Sakurai; Takashi Ogawa; Alt	Duke Ashton; Sherrie Ashton	Ishizuka	3:54
10.	"Doko ni Demo Aru Uta" (どこにでもある唄; Kazunari Ninomiya solo)	Ninomiya	Ninomiya	Ha-j; Ninomiya	5:31
11.	"Negai"	Furaha	IiiSAK; Taylor	IiiSAK; Miyano	4:07
12.	"Lotus"	Soluna	IiiSAK; Hydrant	IiiSAK; Hirofumi Sasaki	4:24
13.	"Janakute" (じゃなくて; Masaki Aiba solo)	Soluna; Iori	Ōshima	Ōshima	3:42
14.	"Morning Light"	Soluna; Unite	Curly; Dr. Hardcastle	Sasaki	3:43
15.	"To Be Free"	Soluna	Samuel Waermö; Octobar	Waermö; Yoshioka	3:43
16.	"Kono Mama Motto" (このままもっと; Sho Sakurai solo)	Sakurai; 100+	100+	Hisashi Nawata	4:43
17.	"Hatenai Sora" (果てない空)	QQ	QQ	Ha-j	4:26
18.	"Tōku Made" (遠くまで)	Ogawa	Erik Lidbom; Taylor	Sasaki	4:37
19.	"Energy Song (Zekkōchō Chō!!!!)" (7-net edition only)	Arashi; Sakurai	Ninomiya	Ha-j; Ninomiya	3:46
Total length:					75:31

== Personnel ==
Credits adapted from liner notes.

=== Musicians ===
- Arashi – lead vocals (all tracks), gaya (tracks 5, 9)
  - Sho Sakurai – rap (track 8)
- Ko-saku – chorus arrangement (tracks 1, 2, 3, 4, 5, 7, 8, 10, 12, 13, 14, 15, 16, 17, 18), chorus (track 6)
- Shotaro – chorus arrangement (tracks 9, 11)
- Kumi Sasaki – chorus (track 6)
- Shiori Sasakii – chorus (track 6)
- Eriko Miedai – chorus (track 6)
- Yoko Kazumotoi – chorus (track 6)
- Kimio Yamane – clarinet (track 7)
- Ha-j – co-programming (track 4)
- Youwhich – co-programming (track 14)
- Yutaka Odawara – drums (track 6)
- John Robinson – drums (track 7)
- Takumi Ogasawara – drums (track 9)
- Toru Kawamura – drums (tracks 10, 17)
- Akira Jimbo – drums (track 18)
- Mana Ohkubo – fiddle (track 6)
- Hideyo Takakuwa – flute (track 7)
- The Gaya-xy – gaya (tracks 5, 9)
- Hiroomi Shitara – acoustic guitar (tracks 3, 5, 7, 10, 11, 14, 17, 18), electric guitar (tracks 3, 7, 10, 14, 17, 18)
- Nozomi Furukawa – acoustic guitar and electric guitar (track 6)
- Hirokazu Ogura – acoustic guitar and electric guitar (track 9)
- Hiroyuki Taneda – acoustic guitar and electric guitar (track 12)
- Takashi Yamaguchi – acoustic guitar (track 16)
- Nathan East – bass guitar (track 7)
- Yuzo Oka – bass guitar (track 6)
- Hideyuki Komatsu – bass guitar (track 9)
- Hideki Matsubara – bass guitar (track 17)
- Hitoki – bass guitar (track 18)
- Kenji Okuda – electric guitar (track 2)
- Takashi Masuzaki – electric guitar (track 8)
- Otohiko Fujita – horn (track 7)
- Yasushi Katsumata – horn (track 7)
- Mana Yoshinaga – koto (track 6)
- Satoshi Shoji – oboe (track 7)
- Kaori Ono – percussion (track 9)
- Hirofumi Sasaki – strings and co-programming (track 2)
- Gen Ittetsu Strings – strings (tracks 2, 3, 10, 12, 17, 18)
- Konno Strings – strings (track 7)
- Manabe Strings – strings (track 11)
- Tadashi Tatabe – synthesizer (tracks 7, 11)
- Aaron Heick – soprano sax and flute (track 16)
- Masakuni Takeno – tenor Sax (track 9)
- Ryoji Ihara – tenor sax (track 9)
- Ikuo Kakehashi – tabla and percussion (track 6)
- Mari Yasui – tin whistle (track 6)
- Koji Nishimura – trumpet (track 7)
- Masahiko Sugasaka – trumpet (track 7)
- Eric Miyashiro – trumpet (track 9)
- Kosuke Nakayama – trumpet (track 9)
- Katsumi Nomura – turntable (track 5)

=== Production ===
- Johnny H. Kitagawa – executive producer
- Julie K. – producer
- Shigeru Tanida – recording, mixing
- Teturo Takeuchi – recording, mixing
- Mikiro Yamada – recording
- Akitomo Takakuwa – recording
- Yohei Takita – recording
- Hideyuki Matsuhashi – recording
- Masahito Komori – 2nd engineer
- Hiroaki Suzuki – 2nd engineer
- Kohei Nakaya – 2nd engineer
- Naoya Tsuruta – 2nd engineer
- Hiroshi Kawasaki – mastering
- Tsutomu Satomi – musician coordinator
- Asuka Tozawa – musician coordinator
- Yasuhiro Okuya – creative direction
- Go Matsuda – art direction and design
- Ryotaro Kawashima – design
- Akira Kitajima – photography
- Masumi Sakamoto – styling
- Ayumi Naito – hair and make-up
- Kosuke Abe – hair and make-up
- Yuuki Yonezawa – set design

== Release history ==
Release history and formats for Beautiful World
Country	Release date	Label
Japan	July 6, 2011	J Storm
South Korea	July 20, 2011	S.M. Entertainment
