= Ring Ding Dong (disambiguation) =

Ring Ding Dong may refer to:

- "Keep Their Heads Ringin'", 1995 single by American rapper Dr. Dre
- "Ring Ding Dong" (Shinee song), 2009 song by South Korean group Shinee

== See also ==
- "Ring a Ding Dong", a 2010 song by Kaela Kimura
- Ring-a-Ding-Ding!, a 1961 album by Frank Sinatra
- "Ring-dinge-ding", a song by Thérèse Steinmetz, the Dutch entry in the Eurovision Song Contest 1967
