= List of number-one digital singles of 2010 (Japan) =

This is a list of songs that reached #1 on the RIAJ Digital Track Chart chart in Japan in 2010. The highest-selling digital singles in Japan are published by Recording Industry Association of Japan. PC downloads and ringtone downloads are not eligible for the chart, only cellphone downloads (Chaku-uta Full) count for the chart.

The chart week runs from Wednesday to Tuesday. The final week of 2009, starting December 29, was merged with the following week (12/30-1/5) due to New Year's celebrations (in a similar manner to Oricon).

== Chart history ==
| Issue date | Song | Artist(s) | Reference(s) |
|---|---|---|---|
| January 5 | "Hatsukoi" | Masaharu Fukuyama | |
| January 12 | "Butterfly" | Kaela Kimura | |
| January 19 | "Always" | Mika Nakashima | |
| January 26 | "Always" | Mika Nakashima | |
| February 2 | "Butterfly" | Kaela Kimura | |
| February 9 | "Forever Love" | Shota Shimizu x Miliyah Kato | |
| February 16 | "Forever Love" | Shota Shimizu x Miliyah Kato | |
| February 23 | "Best Friend" | Kana Nishino | |
| March 2 | "Best Friend" | Kana Nishino | |
| March 9 | "Best Friend" | Kana Nishino | |
| March 16 | "Lion" | Yusuke | |
| March 23 | "Sakura" | Ketsumeishi | |
| March 30 | "Bye Bye" | Miliyah Kato | |
| April 6 | "Mata Kimi ni Koi Shiteru" | Fuyumi Sakamoto | |
| April 13 | "Mata Kimi ni Koi Shiteru" | Fuyumi Sakamoto | |
| April 20 | "Daijōbu" | Hilcrhyme | |
| April 27 | "Daijōbu" | Hilcrhyme | |
| May 4 | "Tsubomi feat. Kusuo" | lecca | |
| May 11 | "Daijōbu" | Hilcrhyme | |
| May 18 | "Aitakute Aitakute" | Kana Nishino | |
| May 25 | "Aitakute Aitakute" | Kana Nishino | |
| June 1 | "Loose Leaf" | Hilcrhyme | |
| June 8 | "Loose Leaf" | Hilcrhyme | |
| June 15 | "Ring a Ding Dong" | Kaela Kimura | |
| June 22 | "Love Rain (Koi no Ame)" | Toshinobu Kubota | |
| June 29 | "Hello, Again (Mukashi Kara Aru Basho)" | Juju | |
| July 6 | "Sunshine Girl" | Moumoon | |
| July 13 | "Lollipop" | Kumi Koda | |
| July 20 | "Moon" | Ayumi Hamasaki | |
| July 27 | "Ofutari Summer" | Ketsumeishi | |
| August 3 | "If" | Kana Nishino | |
| August 17 | "If" | Kana Nishino | |
| August 24 | "Heavy Rotation" | AKB48 | |
| August 31 | "Heavy Rotation" | AKB48 | |
| September 7 | "if" | Kana Nishino | |
| September 14 | "Motto Tsuyoku" | Exile | |
| September 21 | "Suki de, Suki de, Suki de." | Kumi Koda | |
| September 28 | "Motto Tsuyoku" | Exile | |
| October 5 | "Motto Tsuyoku" | Exile | |
| October 12 | "I Wish for You" | Exile | |
| October 19 | "One Day" | The Rootless | |
| October 26 | "Gee" | Girls' Generation | |
| November 2 | "Kimi tte" | Kana Nishino | |
| November 9 | "Kimi tte" | Kana Nishino | |
| November 16 | "Kimi tte" | Kana Nishino | |
| November 23 | "Kono Yoru o Tomete yo" | Juju | |
| November 30 | "Ryūsei" | Kobukuro | |
| December 7 | "Kono Yoru o Tomete yo" | Juju | |
| December 14 | "Kono Yoru o Tomete yo" | Juju | |
| December 21 | "Can't Wait 'Til Christmas" | Hikaru Utada | |

== See also ==
- List of number one Reco-kyō Chart singles 2006–2009
