= Lotus (Arashi song) =

Single by Arashi

from the album Beautiful World
- Released: 23 February 2011
- Recorded: 2011
- Genre: Pop
- Length: 26:36
- Label: J Storm
- Composer(s): IiSAK; Hydrant
- Lyricist(s): Soluna

Arashi singles chronology
"Hatenai Sora" (2010)	"Lotus" (2011)	"Meikyū Love Song" (2011)

"Lotus" is a song recorded by Japanese boy band Arashi. It was released on 23 February 2011, by their record label J Storm. The single is used as the theme song to the drama Bartender starring Arashi member Masaki Aiba. It was released in two editions: a regular edition containing two bonus tracks and instrumental versions of all the songs released in the single, and a limited edition containing a bonus track along with a DVD with a music video of the single.

On the issue dated 7 March 2012, "Lotus" debuted at number one on Japan's Oricon Singles Chart, selling 541,000 copies in its first week. According to Oricon, the single was ranked as the sixth-best-selling single in Japan for the year 2011.

== Track listing ==
Regular edition
No.	Title	Lyrics	Music	Arrangement	Length
1.	"Lotus"	Soluna	IiSAK; Hydrant	IiSAK; Hirofumi Sasaki	4:24
2.	"Ever"	Sakuta Masaya; Alt	Kōsuke Ōshima	Tomoki Ishizuka	4:42
3.	"Boom Boom"	100+; Sho Sakurai	Erik Lidbom; Jon Hällgren	Ha-j	4:12
4.	"Lotus" (instrumental)				4:24
5.	"Ever" (instrumental)				4:42
6.	"Boom Boom" (instrumental)				4:12
Total length:					26:36

Limited edition
No.	Title	Lyrics	Music	Arrangement	Length
1.	"Lotus"	Soluna	IiSAK; Hydrant	IiSAK; Sasaki	4:24
2.	"Ever"	Masaya; Alt	Ōshima	Ishizuka	4:42
Total length:					9:06

Limited edition – DVD
No.	Title	Length
1.	"Lotus" (Music video)
