= Boku no Miteiru Fūkei =

Boku no Miteiru Fūkei 僕の見ている風景

Studio album by Arashi
- Released: August 4, 2010
- Recorded: 2009–2010
- Genre: Pop, R&B
- Length: 85:57
- Label: J Storm
- Producer: Johnny H. Kitagawa (exec.)

Arashi chronology
All the Best! 1999–2009 (2009)	Boku no Miteiru Fūkei 僕の見ている風景 (2010)	Beautiful World (2011)

Singles from Boku no Miteiru Fūkei
- 1. "Everything" Released: July 1, 2009; 2. "My Girl" Released: November 11, 2009; 3. "Troublemaker" Released: March 3, 2010; 4. "Monster" Released: May 19, 2010

Professional ratings
Review scores
Source	Rating
AllMusic	3/5 stars

Boku no Miteiru Fūkei (僕の見ている風景, The Scenery I'm Looking At) is the ninth studio album by Japanese boy band Arashi. The album was released on August 4, 2010 in Japan under their record label J Storm in two editions: a first press version and a regular version. The album debuted at number-one on the Oricon weekly album chart, selling around 731,000 copies. As of August 2010, Boku no Miteiru Fūkei is the best-selling album of 2010 in Japan. On October 12, 2010, the album became the first album of the year to sell over a million copies in Japan. According to Oricon, Boku no Miteiru Fūkei is the best-selling album of 2010 in Japan. The album was released digitally on February 7, 2020.

== Album information ==
Both the first press and regular versions contain twenty tracks; however, the first press edition comes with a special booklet while the regular edition comes with only a lyrics booklet.

=== Songs ===
Boku no Miteiru Fūkei contains four of the band's previously released singles: "Everything", "My Girl", "Troublemaker" and "Monster". "Everything" was used as the theme song for the au by KDDI commercials featuring Arashi as the endorsers, and "My Girl" was used as the theme song for the drama with the same title starring member Masaki Aiba. According to Oricon, "Everything" and "My Girl" were also the fifth and third best-selling 2009 singles respectively in Japan. "Troublemaker" was used as the theme song for the drama Tokujo Kabachi!! (特上カバチ!!, lit. Extraordinary Quibbling) starring Arashi member Sho Sakurai and Maki Horikita, and "Monster" was used as the theme song for the drama Kaibutsu-kun (怪物くん, Little Monster) starring Arashi member Satoshi Ohno.

"Movin' On", the first track of the first disc, was used as the theme song for a Japan Airlines commercial.

"Sora Takaku", sixth track of the second disc, was used as the theme song for Arashi's drama special Saigo no Yakusoku. On January 7, 2010, two days before the drama special's release date, Mezamashi TV aired the first preview of "Sora Takaku".

== Promotion ==
It was announced on September 4, 2010 that Japan Airlines (JAL) will use a Boeing 777-200 bearing both the images of the members of Arashi and the title of the album, which will be sold with a specially designed cover in-flight, from September 5, 2010 to January 2011.

== Commercial performance ==
On the first day of its release, the album debuted at number-one on the Oricon daily album chart by selling around 275,000 copies. The album maintained its number-one spot on the Oricon album chart, selling around 731,000 copies in its first week. The album remained number-one in its second week, making Boku no Miteiru Fūkei Arashi's first studio album to lead the Oricon weekly album chart for two consecutive weeks. By selling around another 125,000 copies, the album has sold a total of 856,000 copies. As of October 2010, the album has sold 1,007,896 copies, making it the first album of the year to reach one million copies sold in Japan.

Boku no Miteiru Fūkei has been certified Million by Recording Industry Association of Japan (RIAJ).

== Track listing ==
CD 1
No.	Title	Lyrics	Music	Arrangement	Length
1.	"Movin' On"	Tomokazu Miura; Takashi Ogawa; Sho Sakurai	Dr. Hardcastle; Dyce Taylor; Youwhich	Youwhich	4:23
2.	"Mada Ue o" (マダ上ヲ "Not Yet at the Top")	Ogawa; Hydrant; Sakurai	Dapo Torimiro; Drew Ryan Scott	Taku Yoshioka; Hirofumi Sasaki	3:40
3.	"Refrain" (リフレイン "Rifurein")	R.P.P.	R.P.P.	R.P.P.	4:50
4.	"Troublemaker"	H. Suzuki	Masashi Ohtsuki	Ha-j	4:03
5.	"Taboo" (Sho Sakurai solo)	100db; Sakurai	100db	100db	3:15
6.	"Circus" (サーカス "Sākasu")	Soluna	IiiSAK; Hydrant	Youwhich	3:48
7.	"Gift" (ギフト "Gifuto")	Masaya Sakuta	Sakuta	Ha-j	4:54
8.	"Everything"	100+	Shingo Asari	ISB	4:01
9.	"Come Back to Me" (Jun Matsumoto solo)	Shigeo	Shigeo	Shigeo; Yoshioka	4:26
10.	"My Girl"	Wonderland	Shinya Tada	Naoki-T	4:45
11.	"Magical Song" (Masaki Aiba solo)	Youth Case	Figge Boström; Martin Ankelius	Sasaki; Ankelius	3:45
12.	"Let Me Down"	Choku Tanaka; Sakurai	Tanaka	Tanaka	4:03

CD 2
No.	Title	Lyrics	Music	Arrangement	Length
1.	"Monster"	Unite; Sean-D	Chi-Mey	Yoshioka; Sasaki	4:28
2.	"Don't Stop"	Sachiko Inamura	Kazumi Mitome	Sasaki	4:27
3.	"Shizuka na Yoru ni" (静かな夜に "In the Quiet Night", Satoshi Ohno solo)	R.P.P.	Dr. Hardcastle; Youth Case	Dr. Hardcastle	4:47
4.	"Mukae ni Iku yo" (むかえに行くよ "I Will Go to Meet You")	Tatsurō Mashiko	Mashiko	Mashiko	4:51
5.	"1992*4##111" ("arigatō" (ありがとう) "Thank You", (Note: According to Ninomiya, "1992*4##111" is read as "arigatō" (ありがとう, thank you).) Kazunari Ninomiya solo)	Ninomiya	Ninomiya	Ha-j; Ninomiya	5:22
6.	"Sora Takaku" (空高く "Sky High")	Sean-D; Sakurai	Yuichi Yagi	Hisashi Nawata	3:58
7.	"Kagerô" ("Heat Haze")	Soluna	Tateki Kobayashi	Ha-j	3:51
8.	"Summer Splash!"	The Sendai Sepia; Sakurai	The Sendai Sepia	The Sendai Sepia	4:20
Total length:					85:57

== Charts and certifications ==
=== Charts ===
Chart (2010)	Peak position
Billboard Japan Yearly Top Albums	2
Japan Oricon Daily Album Chart	1
Japan Oricon Weekly Album Chart	1
Japan Oricon Yearly Album Chart	1

=== Sales and certifications ===
Country	Provider	Sales	Certification
Japan	RIAJ	1,131,725	Million

== Release history ==
Release history and formats for Boku no Miteiru Fūkei
Country	Date	Label	Format	Catalog
Japan	August 4, 2010	J Storm	2CD	JACA-5232
South Korea	August 18, 2010	SM Entertainment	2CD	SMJTCD359
Taiwan	August 20, 2010	Avex Asia	2CD	JAJCD26012/3
Hong Kong	August 25, 2010	Avex Asia	2CD	

== Personnel ==
=== Musicians ===
- Arashi
  - Masaki Aiba – vocals
  - Jun Matsumoto – vocals
  - Kazunari Ninomiya – vocals
  - Satoshi Ohno – vocals
  - Sho Sakurai – vocals
- Pia-no-Jac – Piano, cajón
