= Ring a Ding Dong =

Single by Kaela Kimura

from the album 8Eight8
- Released: June 9, 2010
- Genre: J-pop
- Length: 3:24
- Label: Columbia Music Entertainment
- Songwriter: Kaela Kimura

Kaela Kimura singles chronology
| "Musuko (Our Music Ver.) with Tamio Okuda" (2010) | "Ring a Ding Dong" (2010) | "Deep Beep" (2010) |

"Ring a Ding Dong" is Japanese musician Kaela Kimura's 16th physical single, released on June 9, 2010. The song was used in a wide-scale commercial campaign for NTT DoCoMo, which featured Kimura in the commercials.

== Background ==
This single is the first to be released after Kimura's hit song "Butterfly," and the first after the announcement of her marriage to Japanese actor Eita.

== Music video ==
Kimura in the music video.

The music video was shot by director Takeshi Nakamura. It features Kimura in a brightly painted room with many doors, dancing to the song along with four dancers, dressed in maid's outfits and suits and holding umbrellas. Through the video, more and more exotically dressed dancers enter the room and begin dancing.

== Track listing ==
| No. | Title | Lyrics | Music | Length |
|---|---|---|---|---|
| 1. | "Ring a Ding Dong" | Kaela Kimura | Kaela Kimura | 3:24 |
| 2. | "Butterfly" | Kimura | Atsushi Suemitsu | 6:21 |
| 3. | "Circle" | Kimura | Mito | 5:22 |
| 4. | "Stars" | Kimura | AxSxE | 4:22 |
| 5. | "1115" | Kimura | Tamio Okuda | 4:06 |
| 6. | "Banzai" | Kimura | Tarō Kohada (Avengers in Sci-Fi) | 4:40 |
| 7. | "Tree Climbers" | Kimura, Watanabe | Watanabe | 3:38 |
| 8. | "Magic Music" | Kimura | Linus of Hollywood | 3:08 |
| 9. | "Level 42" | Kimura | Taiyō Yamazaki | 4:39 |
| 10. | "Ring a Ding Dong (Instrumental)" | Kimura, Watanabe | Watanabe | 3:21 |
| Total length: | | | | 43:01 |

*Tracks 2–9 live recordings from Kimura's Live Tour 2010 "5 Years" @ Nippon Budōkan (March 27/28 2010).

== Chart rankings ==
"Ring a Ding Dong"
A sample of the song "Ring a Ding Dong."

Weekly chart performance for "Ring a Ding Dong"
| Chart | Peak position |
|---|---|
| Billboard Adult Contemporary Airplay | 1 |
| Billboard Japan Hot 100 | 2 |
| Billboard yearly Japan Hot 100 | 25 |
| Oricon weekly singles | 1 |
| RIAJ Digital Track Chart Top 100 | 1 |
| RIAJ Digital Track Chart yearly top 100 | 28 |

Annual chart rankings for "Ring a Ding Dong"
| Chart (2010) | Rank |
|---|---|
| Japan Adult Contemporary (Billboard Japan) | 18 |

== Reported sales and certifications ==
| Chart | Amount |
|---|---|
| Oricon physical sales | 92,000 |
| RIAJ shipping certification | Gold (100,000) |
| RIAJ ringtones | Million (1,000,000) |
| RIAJ full-length cellphone downloads | Platinum (250,000) |
| RIAJ PC downloads | Gold (100,000) |

== See also ==
- List of Oricon number-one singles of 2010
- List of number-one digital singles of 2010 (Japan)
