= Billboard Japan Music Awards =

Annual set of music awards

- Awarded for: Achievements in music
- Country: Japan
- Presented by: Billboard Japan
- First award: 2009; 16 years ago
- Website: billboard-japan.com/awards/

Billboard Japan Music Awards are an annual set of music awards, founded by Billboard Japan, the Japanese online edition of the music magazine Billboard.

The awards honor artists, both Japanese and foreign, who had achieved best results in Billboard Japan charts during the year. Different awards are based on different formulas, combining both chart data and votes from the public. The main award, Artist of the Year, is determined solely by popular vote.

The awards are given at an annual awards show featuring performances by celebrated artists. The first awards ceremony was held in 2010.

== Award categories ==
Music categories
- Billboard Japan Hot 100 of the Year (2009–present)
- Billboard Japan Hot Albums of the Year (2015–present)
- Billboard Japan Top Single Sales of the Year (2009–present)
- Billboard Japan Hot Animation of the Year (2011–present)
- Billboard Japan Hot Overseas of the Year (2014–present)
- Billboard Japan Top Albums Sales of the Year (2009–present)
- Billboard Japan Top Jazz Albums of the Year (2009–present)
- Billboard Japan Streaming Songs of the Year (2017–present)
- Billboard Japan Download Songs of the Year (2017–present)
- Billboard Japan Download Albums of the Year (2017–present)

Artist categories
- Billboard Japan Artist of the Year (2009–present)
- Billboard Japan Top Pop Artist (2009–present)
- Billboard Japan Jazz Artist of the Year (2009–present)
- Billboard Japan Classic Artist of the Year (2009–present)
- Billboard Japan Animation Artist of the Year (2011–present)
- Billboard Japan Independent Artist of the Year (2009–present)

Past categories
- Billboard Japan Digital and Airplay Overseas of the Year (2011–2014)
- Billboard Japan Adult Contemporary of the Year (2009–2014)
- Billboard Japan Independent of the Year (2009–2014)
- Billboard Japan Overseas Soundtrack Albums (2009–2014)
- Billboard Japan Radio Songs of the Year (2009–2016)
- Billboard Japan Top Classical Albums of the Year (2009–2016)
- Billboard Japan Top Jazz Albums of the Year (2009–2016)

== Award ceremonies ==
The awards ceremony has taken place in December–February. The 2009 and 2010 awards were broadcast on Fuji TV Next, since 2011 on Osaka TV and Tokyo TV.

=== Presenters ===
- 2009: Tokoaki Ogura, Kyōko Kamei, Mibu Minami
- 2010: Tokoaki Ogura, Kyōko Kamei, Maria Okada
- 2011: Christopher Peppler, Keiko Yashio
- 2012: Yūji Miyake, Chiaki Horan
- 2013: Yūji Miyake, Chiaki Horan

== Award recipients ==
=== Major awards ===
Year	Artist of the Year	Hot 100 of the Year	Top album of the Year
2009	Exile	B'z – "Ichibu to Zenbu"	Exile – Exile Ballad Best
2010	Exile	Arashi – "Troublemaker"	Exile – Aisubeki Mirai e
2011	AKB48	AKB48 – "Everyday, Katyusha"	Mr. Children – Sense
2012	AKB48	AKB48 – "Manatsu no Sounds Good!"	Mr. Children – Mr. Children 2005–2010 ＜macro＞
2013	AKB48	AKB48 – "Koi Suru Fortune Cookie"	Arashi – Love
2014	Kana Nishino	Arashi – "Guts!"	Various Artists – Frozen (soundtrack)
2015	Kana Nishino	Sandaime J Soul Brothers – "Ryusei"	Arashi – Japonism
2016	AKB48	AKB48 – "Tsubasa wa Iranai"	Arashi – Are You Happy?
2017	Gen Hoshino	Gen Hoshino – "Koi"	Namie Amuro – Finally
2018	Kenshi Yonezu	Kenshi Yonezu – "Lemon"	Namie Amuro – Finally
2019	Aimyon	Kenshi Yonezu – "Lemon"	Arashi – 5x20 All the Best!! 1999–2019
2020	Official Hige Dandism	Yoasobi - "Yoru ni Kakeru"	Kenshi Yonezu – Stray Sheep

=== Special awards ===
Year	Best New Artist	Publisher Award			Daiwa House Award
Year	Best New Artist	US	Japan	South Korea	Daiwa House Award
2009	Yusuke Kamiji	Judith Hill, BoA	Vamps	After School	—
2010	Tee	—	—	4Minute	HY
2011	Kaoru to Tomoki, Tamani Mook	Saori Yuki	—	Gummy	Bigmama
2012	Leo Ieiri	—	—	—	Bigmama
2013	Kera Kera	—	—	—	Morning Musume

== See also ==
- Billboard Music Awards
