= Noa (No Doubt Tracks singer) =

Japanese musician

- Born: Japan
- Other name: Kaoru
- Occupations: Singer; model; television personality
- Years active: 2007–present
- Agent: No Doubt Tracks
- Website: nodoubttracks.com/artistlist/noa.php

Noa is a Japanese singer, model, and television personality associated with No Doubt Tracks.

== Career ==
After winning an audition for the indie label No Doubt Tracks, Noa debuted in 2007 as a featured artist on the compilation album Ride On West under the name Kaoru. In 2008, she released her first studio album Lucy Love, as a tie-in to a Californian fashion brand.

== Discography ==
=== Studio albums ===
List of studio albums, with selected chart positions, sales figures and certifications
Title	Year	Album details	Peak chart positions			Sales
Title	Year	Album details	Japan			Sales
Title	Year	Album details	Oricon (CD)	Oricon	Billboard Japan	Sales
Lucy Love	2008	Released: December 3, 2008; Label: Hudson Music Entertainment; Format: CD	61	—	—	—
Lucy Love: Season II	2009	Released: August 5, 2009; Label: Hudson Music Entertainment; Format: CD	8	—	—	—
Noaism	2010	Released: August 18, 2010; Label: Hudson Music Entertainment; Format: CD	14	—	—	—
N	2011	Released: December 7, 2011; Label: King Records; Format: CD	14	—	—	—
Noa's Love	2012	Released: July 11, 2012; Label: King Records; Format: CD	7	—	—	—
Molt	2013	Released: July 17, 2013; Label: King Records; Format: CD	18	—	—	—
Ai ga Nakereba (愛がなければ)	2015	Released: October 14, 2015; Label: Nippon Crown; Format: CD	54	—	—	—
Supple	2017	Released: April 26, 2017; Label: Nippon Crown; Format: CD	111	—	—	—
"—" denotes releases that did not chart or were not released in that region.

=== Extended plays ===
List of extended plays, with selected chart positions, sales figures and certifications
Title	Year	Album details	Peak chart positions			Sales
Title	Year	Album details	Japan			Sales
Title	Year	Album details	Oricon (CD)	Oricon	Billboard Japan	Sales
Lucy Love: Winter Season	2009	Released: December 16, 2009; Label: Hudson Music Entertainment; Format: CD	28	—	—	—
"—" denotes releases that did not chart or were not released in that region.
