= Kusuo =

- Gender: Male

Origin
- Origin: Japanese
- Meaning: Different meanings depending on the kanji used

Kusuo (written: 久寿雄 or 九州男) is a masculine Japanese given name. Notable people with the name include:

- Kusuo Kitamura (北村 久寿雄) (1917–1996), Japanese swimmer
- Kusuo Oshima (大島 九州男) (born 1961), Japanese politician

== Fictional characters ==
- Kusuo Saiki from The Disastrous Life of Saiki K.
