= Samuel Waermö =

Songwriter

Samuel Waermö (1968–2024) was a successful international Swedish songwriter and music producer with a big number of accomplishments and hits and a number of chart-topping #1 hits (33 #1 at the charts) mostly in Europe and East Asia. Since 2008 he runs his own publishing company called SWEMUSIC ( webadress: swemusic.com)

He has co-written songs with Michael Garvin, Randy Goodrum, Desmond Child, Andreas Carlsson, Jörgen Elofsson and Pelle Nylen Samuel Waermö was also involved in the production of 6 songs on the Bon Jovi hugely successful album Bounce.

== Songs ==
- Wang Leehom – "My Heart Holds the Love" (Taiwan)
- Scandal'us – "High on your Love" (Australia - Platinum)
- John Farnham – "When I Can't Have You" (Australia - 3× platinum)
- Whatfor – "Un peu de patience" (France Popstars)
- Alexander Klaws – "Break Free" (Germany - 2× platinum)
- Daniel Lindström – "Break Free" (Sweden - Platinum)
- BoA – "Quincy" (Japan - Japan Record Award nomination)
- BoA – "Love Can Make a Miracle" (South Korea)
- Rosa López – "La Esencia de Tu Voz" (Spain - 2× platinum)
- Bon Jovi – Bounce (album) (4.5m copies sold)
- K One – "Power Generation" (Taiwan)
- Elena Paparizou – "Mambo" (Greece - platinum)
- Mink – "Glory of Life" (Japan - #1 USA Billboard Dance Chart)
- Tobias Regner – "She's So" (German Idol winner)
- Clay Aiken – "Lonely No More" (USA - gold)
- NEWS – "My Only World" (Japan)
- Kanjani Eight – Glorious (album) (Japan)
- Arashi – "To Be Free" (Japan - 2× platinum)
- Sexy Zone – "CANDY ～Can U be my BABY～" (Kento Nakajima Solo)(Japan)
- Kis-my-ft2 – "Everybody Go" (Japan - platinum)
- SixTONES - "My Hometown" on 1ST (Japan 2× platinum)

== Awards ==
Samuel was for awarded for best pop song in Taiwan for the song "My Heart Hold the Love" performed by Leehom Wang

In 1998, he won a Grammy in Japan for best pop song . He also got another Grammy in 2004 for the song "Quincy", with the artist BoA in Japan, with the single selling over 1.3 million copies.
