= Dear Snow =

2010 single by Arashi

Single by Arashi

from the album Beautiful World
- B-side: "Time Capsule"
- Released: 6 October 2010
- Recorded: 2010
- Genre: Pop
- Label: J Storm
- Songwriter(s): Iori; Ishu; Kohsuke Ohshima

Arashi singles chronology
| "Love Rainbow" (2010) | "Dear Snow" (2010) | "Hatenai Sora" (2010) |

"Dear Snow" is a song recorded by Japanese boy band Arashi for their tenth studio album, Beautiful World (2011). It was released as a CD single on 6 October 2010 through J Storm. "Dear Snow" was the theme song for member Kazunari Ninomiya's film Ōoku: The Inner Chambers.

"Dear Snow" reached number one on the Oricon Singles Chart for the week ending 10 October 2010 with initial sales of 501,000 copies. Within the same month of release, it was certified Double Platinum for shipments of over 500,000 units.

== Single information ==
The single was released in two different versions: a Limited Version consisting of the A-side and a DVD with music video, and a Regular Edition containing a B-side and karaoke versions of the two songs. The music video was directed by Choku.

== Track listing ==
| No. | Title | Lyrics | Music | Arrangement | Length |
|---|---|---|---|---|---|
| 1. | "Dear Snow" | Iori; Ishu | Kohsuke Ohshima | Sachiko Miyano; Taku Yoshioka | 4:45 |
| 2. | "Time Capsule" | Six | Six | Six | 4:57 |
| 3. | "Dear Snow" (Instrumental) | | | | 4:45 |
| 4. | "Time Capsule" (Instrumental) | | | | 4:53 |
| Total length: | | | | | 19:20 |

Limited edition
| No. | Title | Lyrics | Music | Arrangement | Length |
|---|---|---|---|---|---|
| 1. | "Dear Snow" | Iori; Ishu | Ohshima | Miyano; Yoshioka | 4:43 |
| Total length: | | | | | 4:43 |

Limited edition – DVD
| No. | Title | Length |
|---|---|---|
| 1. | "Dear Snow" (Music video + making-of) |
| 2. | "Dear Snow" (Photo gallery making-of) |

== Charts and certifications ==
=== Weekly charts ===
| Chart (2010) | Peak position |
|---|---|
| Japan (Oricon Singles Chart) | 1 |
| Japan (Billboard Japan Hot 100) | 1 |
| South Korea (Gaon Album Chart) | 38 |
| South Korea (Gaon International Album Chart) | 4 |

=== Year-end charts ===
| Chart (2010) | Peak position |
|---|---|
| Japan (Oricon Singles Chart) | 9 |

=== Certifications ===
| Region | Certification | Certified units/sales |
|---|---|---|
| Japan (RIAJ) | 2× Platinum | 599,000 |
