= Monster (Arashi song) =

Single by Arashi

from the album Boku no Miteiru Fūkei
- B-side: "Spiral"
- Released: May 19, 2010
- Recorded: 2010
- Genre: Pop
- Length: 18:09 (Regular edition); 9:03 (Limited edition)
- Label: J Storm
- Songwriter(s): Unite; Sean-D; Chi-mey

Arashi singles chronology
"Troublemaker" (2010)	"Monster" (2010)	"To Be Free" (2010)

Music video
- "Monster" on YouTube

"Monster" is a song recorded by Japanese boy band Arashi. It was released on May 19, 2010 by their record label J Storm, as part of the CD single of the same name. The single was released as a regular edition, containing the title song, the song "Spiral", and their instrumental versions; and a limited edition, containing both songs and a DVD. "Monster" was used as the theme song for a drama starring Arashi member Satoshi Ohno.

== Single information ==
On April 5, 2010, it was announced that Arashi would provide the theme song "Monster" for Ohno's fantasy comedy drama based on Fujiko Fujio's manga series Kaibutsu-kun (怪物くん, Little Monster). The single was released in two formats: a regular edition, which included A-side "Monster", the B-side "Spiral" (スパイラル; "Supairaru") and the instrumentals for both the tracks; and a limited edition, which included the two tracks and a DVD containing the promotional video for "Monster" and its making of.

The song's music video was included in their official YouTube channel, when it opened in 2019, and later on, also a live version. The song was also included in their official pages of streaming sites Apple Music, Spotify, and the such.

== Chart performance ==
The single sold about 232,000 copies on the first day of its release on May 19, 2010, debuting at number one on the Oricon singles daily chart. On the Oricon singles weekly chart, the single placed at number one, selling about 543,000 copies. "Monster" also became Arashi's thirtieth consecutive single to rank within the Top 3 since their debut single, making Arashi the first act to achieve such a feat.

On June 24, 2010, "Monster" placed at number-one on the Oricon first half of the year singles chart by selling 654,287 copies overall. According to Oricon, "Monster" is the fourth best-selling single of 2010 in Japan.

The song was Arashi's fifth to reach 100 million streams.

== Track listing ==
Regular edition
No.	Title	Lyrics	Music	Arrangement	Length
1.	"Monster"	Unite; Sean-D	Chi-Mey	Taku Yoshioka; Hirofumi Sasaki	4:29
2.	"Spiral"	Takashi Ogawa; Sho Sakurai	Kazumi Mitome	Ha-j	4:37
3.	"Monster" (Instrumental)	Unite; Sean-D	Chi-mey	Yoshioka; Sasaki	4:29
4.	"Spiral" (Instrumental)	Ogawa; Sakurai	Mitome	Ha-j	4:34
Total length:					18:09

Limited edition
No.	Title	Lyrics	Music	Arrangement	Length
1.	"Monster"	Unite; Sean-D	Chi-mey	Yoshioka; Sasaki	4:29
2.	"Spiral"	Ogawa; Sakurai	Mitome	Ha-j	4:37
Total length:					9:03

Limited edition – DVD
No.	Title	Length
1.	"Monster" (PV)	4:37
2.	"Monster" (Making-of)

== Charts and certifications ==
=== Weekly charts ===
Chart (2010)	Peak position
Japan (Oricon Singles Chart)	1
Japan (Japan Hot 100)	1
South Korea (Gaon)	12
South Korea International (Gaon)	2

=== Year-end charts ===
Chart (2010)	Peak position
Japan (Oricon Singles Chart)	2
Japan (Japan Hot 100)	4

=== Certifications ===
Region	Certification	Certified units/sales
Japan (RIAJ)	2× Platinum	696,022

== Release history ==
Release history and formats for "Monster"
Region	Date	Format	Distributor
Japan	May 19, 2010	CD single (JACA-5218); CD+DVD (JACA-5216)	J Storm
South Korea	June 3, 2010	CD single (SMJTCD351); CD+DVD (SMJTCD350B)	SM Entertainment
Taiwan	June 4, 2010	CD single (JAJSG27029); CD+DVD (JAJSG27029/A)	Avex Taiwan
Hong Kong	June 11, 2010	CD single CD+DVD	Avex Asia
