= Hatenai Sora =

Single by Arashi

from the album Beautiful World
- Released: 10 November 2010
- Recorded: 2010
- Genre: Pop
- Label: J Storm
- Songwriter(s): QQ

Arashi singles chronology
"Dear Snow" (2010)	"Hatenai Sora" (2010)	"Lotus" (2011)

"Hatenai Sora" (果てない空, Endless Sky) is a song by Japanese boy band Arashi from their tenth studio album Beautiful World (2011). It was released as a CD single on 10 November 2010, through J Storm. "Hatenai Sora" was the theme song for the television drama Freeter, Ie wo Kau, which stars member Kazunari Ninomiya.

"Hatenai Sora" debuted at number one on the Oricon Singles Chart for the week ending 22 November 2010 with initial sales of 572,000 copies, making it Arashi's 30th number-one single in Japan. It debuted on the Billboard Japan Hot 100 at number 71 and reached the top of the chart three weeks later. In the same month of release, the single was certified double platinum by the Recording Industry Association of Japan (RIAJ) for shipment of 500,000 copies. According to Oricon, "Hatenai Sora" was the sixth best-selling single of 2010.

== Track listing ==
Regular edition
No.	Title	Lyrics	Music	Arrangement	Length
1.	"Hatenai Sora" (果てない空)	QQ	QQ	Ha-j	4:27
2.	"Story"	Takashi Ogawa; Alt	Kōsuke Ōba	Taku Yoshioka	4:01
3.	"Maboroshi"	Tateki Kobayashi	Kobayashi	Sachiko Miyano	5:01
4.	"Ano Hi no Merry Christmas" (あの日のメリークリスマス)	Soluna	Takuya Harada	Hirofumi Sasaki	4:24
5.	"Hatenai Sora" (instrumental)				4:27
6.	"Story" (instrumental)				4:01
7.	"Maboroshi" (instrumental)				5:01
8.	"Ano Hi no Merry Christmas" (instrumental)				4:24
Total length:					35:46

Limited edition
No.	Title	Lyrics	Music	Arrangement	Length
1.	"Hatenai Sora"	QQ	QQ	Ha-j	4:27
2.	"Ano Hi no Merry Christmas"	Soluna	Harada	Sasaki	4:24
Total length:					8:51

Limited edition – DVD
No.	Title	Length
1.	"Hatenai Sora" (Music video)
2.	"Hatenai Sora" (Making-of)
3.	"Hatenai Sora" (Photo gallery)

== Covers ==
Superfly covered the song in her album "Amazing", released in digital form on June 16 and CD on June 18, 2025. As of June 27, the song ranked #101 on iTunes (the album reaching the third spot), with over 199 thousand views on YouTube and 106 thousand streams on Spotify.
