= Love Rainbow =

"Løve Rainbow"

Single by Arashi

from the album Beautiful World
- B-side: "over"
- Released: 8 September 2010
- Recorded: 2010
- Genre: Pop
- Label: J Storm
- Songwriter(s): Furaha; Octobar; iiiSak; Dyce Taylor

Arashi singles chronology
"To Be Free" (2010)	"Løve Rainbow" (2010)	"Dear Snow" (2010)

"Love Rainbow" (stylized as Løve Rainbow) is a song recorded by Japanese boy band Arashi, for their tenth studio album, Beautiful World (2011). It was released as a CD single on 8 September 2010 under the record label J Storm. "Love Rainbow" was used as the theme song for member, Jun Matsumoto's starring drama Natsu no Koi wa Nijiiro ni Kagayaku.

"Love Rainbow" reached number one on the Oricon Singles Chart for the week ending 12 September 2010 with initial sales of 529,000 copies. Within the same month of release, it was certified Double Platinum for shipments of over 500,000 units. "Love Rainbow" was the seventh best-selling single of 2010.

== Release ==
The single was released in two editions. A regular version and a limited edition. The regular edition contains the title track and the b-side, "Over", and instrumentals of both tracks. The limited edition contains the title track and "Over", and the music video and making-of video for the title track.

== Track listing ==
Regular Edition
No.	Title	Lyrics	Music	Arrangement	Length
1.	"Løve Rainbow"	Furaha; Octobar	iiSak; Dyce Taylor	ha-j	4:42
2.	"over"	Tomokazu Miura	Hikari	Hirofumi Sasaki	4:58
3.	"Løve Rainbow (instrumental)"				4:42
4.	"over (instrumental)"				4:54
Total length:					19:16

Limited Edition
No.	Title	Length
1.	"Løve Rainbow"	4:42
2.	"over"	4:54
3.	"Løve Rainbow (music video)" (DVD)
4.	"Løve Rainbow (music video making-of)" (DVD)
Total length:		9:36

== Charts and certifications ==
=== Charts ===
Chart (2010)	Peak position
Japan (Oricon Singles Chart	1
Japan (Japan Hot 100)	1
Japan (Oricon Yearly Singles Chart)	7
South Korea (Gaon Album Chart)	30
South Korea (Gaon International Album Chart)	3

=== Sales and certifications ===
Region	Certification	Certified units/Sales
Japan (RIAJ)	2× Platinum	620,057
