= Rake (singer) =

Japanese singer-songwriter (born 1979)

- Born: 15 August 1979 (age 46)
- Origin: Sendai, Japan
- Genres: J-pop, pop-rock
- Occupation: Singer-songwriter
- Instrument: Acoustic guitar
- Years active: 2010–present
- Labels: Sony Music Entertainment Japan
- Website: www.rake.website

Rake (レイク, Reiku; born 15 August 1979) is a Japanese singer-songwriter who debuted under Sony Music Entertainment Japan in 2010.

== Biography ==
Rake was born in Sendai, Japan. He began an interest in music by playing an antique guitar at his family home, and in high school, was a member of a hard rock band. In university, Rake considered singing for the first time, and began steps to becoming a professional musician.

Rake performed as the opening act to Japanese band Kimaguren's 2009 tour Kid in the Sky, and the following January debuted under Sony Music Japan, with the single "Fly Away." The song was used as the theme song for the Tokyo MX drama Taxmen, and while few copies were sold, the song received such extremely heavy airplay across Japan that it topped Billboard's Japan Hot 100 chart for two weeks. Rake, after releasing his debut extended play All You Need Is, performed his first solo concert in July, followed by performances at summer festival Summer Sonic in August.

In 2011, Rake had his first hit single, "Hyakuman-kai no "I Love You"," which was used in a television commercial campaign for Yokohama Tire. The song was successful on the RIAJ Digital Track Chart in its first week, debuting at number six. However, due to the 2011 Tōhoku earthquake and tsunami occurring several days after the single's physical release in Rake's hometown, many promotional events for the song were cancelled. Rake was at his home in Sendai at the time of the earthquake.

In 2015 he went into retirement as a singer-songwriter until 2018 when he resumed under a new project called "Samurai Japan Project".

== Discography ==
=== Album ===
Year	Album Information	Oricon Albums Charts	Reported sales
2011	First Sight: Released: 1 June 2011; Label: Sony Music Japan (BVCL-202); Formats: CD, digital download	20	24,000

=== Extended play ===
Year	Album Information
2010	All You Need Is...: Released: 9 June 2010; Label: Sony Music Japan (BVCL-96); Formats: CD, digital download

=== Singles ===
Release	Title	Notes	Chart positions			Oricon sales	Album
Release	Title	Notes	Oricon Singles Charts	Billboard Japan Hot 100	RIAJ digital tracks	Oricon sales	Album
2010	"Fly Away"	Billboard No. 1 for two weeks.	159	1	—	300	All You Need Is.../First Sight
2010	"Sekai wa Kyō mo Bokura o Nosete Mawaru" (世界は今日も僕らをのせてまわる; "Today, the World Keeps Turning and Carrying Us")		—	75	—	—	All You Need Is...
2011	"Hyakuman-kai no "I Love You"" (100万回の「I love you」; "The Millionth 'I Love You'")	Certified platinum for full-length cellphone downloads.	25	33	6	16,000	First Sight
2012	"Futari Hitotsu" (フタリヒトツ; "Two People, One Person")		TBA	66	13	TBA	WONDERFUL WORLD
2012	"Subarashiki Sekai/Taisetsu Na Hito" (素晴らしき世界/大切な人; "Wonderful World/Precious One")	ED song for Space Brothers anime.	TBA	TBA	TBA	TBA	WONDERFUL WORLD

=== Other charted songs ===
Release	Title	Chart positions		Album
Release	Title	Billboard Japan Hot 100	RIAJ digital tracks	Album
2010	"All I Need Is..."	99	—	All You Need Is...
2011	"Chikai" (誓い; "Oath")	—	88	First Sight
