= To Be Free (Arashi song) =

Single by Arashi

from the album Beautiful World
- Released: 7 July 2010
- Recorded: 2010
- Genre: Pop
- Length: 7:28
- Label: J Storm
- Songwriter(s): Soluna; Samuel Waermö; Octobar

Arashi singles chronology
"Monster" (2010)	"To Be Free" (2010)	"Love Rainbow" (2010)

"To Be Free" is a song recorded by Japanese boy band Arashi. It was released on 7 July 2010 through their record label J Storm. "To Be Free" was the CM song for the Asahi Soft Drinks Mitsuya Cider commercials, which starred Arashi member Sho Sakurai. Only one version of the physical single was released, containing the song's instrumental track and a DVD.

== Track listing ==
CD
No.	Title	Lyrics	Music	Arrangement	Length
1.	"To Be Free"	Soluna	Samuel Waermö; Octobar	Waermö; Taku Yoshioka	3:45
2.	"To Be Free" (Instrumental)	Soluna	Waermö; Octobar	Waermö; Yoshioka	3:43
Total length:					7:23

DVD
No.	Title	Length
1.	"To Be Free" (Music video)
2.	"To Be Free" (Making-of)

== Commercial performance ==
The single debuted at number one on the Oricon daily singles chart with initial sales of 180,000 copies. On the week ending 13 July 2010, "To Be Free" placed number one on the weekly singles chart, selling 426,000 copies in its first week of release. It became the group's twentieth consecutive number-one single on the chart (since their 2004 single "Pikanchi Double"). Together with member Satoshi Ohno's solo single "Yukai Tsukai Kaibutsu-kun" (ユカイツーカイ怪物くん), which was released on the same day as "To Be Free", Arashi and Ohno accomplished the rare feat of a group and a solo artist from the group simultaneously taking the top two spots for the first time in nearly ten years. "To Be Free" entered the Billboard Japan Hot 100 chart on the week ending 28 June 2010. It peaked at number one on 19 July 2010, and remained number one for two consecutive weeks.

According to Oricon, "To Be Free" was the tenth best-selling single of 2010 in Japan. It placed ninth on the year-end Japan Hot 100 chart. The single was certified Double Platinum for shipments of 500,000 units.

== Charts and certifications ==
=== Weekly charts ===
Chart (2010)	Peak position
Japan (Oricon Singles Chart)	1
Japan (Japan Hot 100)	1
South Korea (Gaon)	18
South Korea International (Gaon)	4

=== Year-end charts ===
Chart (2010)	Peak position
Japan (Oricon Singles Chart)	10
Japan (Japan Hot 100)	9

=== Certifications ===
Region	Certification	Certified units/sales
Japan (RIAJ)	2× Platinum	516,142

== Release history ==
Release history and formats for "To Be Free"
Region	Date	Format	Label	Ref.
Japan	7 July 2010	CD single + DVD	J Storm	
South Korea	21 July 2010	CD single + DVD	SM Entertainment	
Taiwan	23 July 2010	CD single + DVD	Avex Taiwan	
Hong Kong	31 July 2010	CD single + DVD	Avex Asia	
