= Mahō no Ryōri (Kimi Kara Kimi e) =

"Mahō no Ryōri (Kimi kara Kimi e)"

Single by Bump of Chicken

from the album Cosmonaut (album)
- Released: April 21, 2010
- Genre: Rock
- Label: Toy's Factory; TFCC-89303
- Songwriter(s): Motoo Fujiwara

Bump of Chicken singles chronology
"HAPPY" (2010)	"Mahō no Ryōri (Kimi kara Kimi e)" (2010)	"Uchūhikōshi e no Tegami/Motorcycle" (2010)

"Mahō no Ryōri (Kimi kara Kimi e)" (魔法の料理 ～君から君へ～, Magical Cooking ~From You to You~) is the seventeenth single by Bump of Chicken, released on April 21, 2010, just 1 week after the preceding single "Happy". It was written just before Fujiwara turned 30, based on the concept of him talking to his younger self. It was also used by NHK's Minna no Uta between April and May 2010.

== Track listing ==
1. "Mahō no Ryōri (Kimi kara Kimi e)" (魔法の料理 ～君から君へ～, Magical Cooking ~From You to You~) - 6:22
2. "Caravan" (キャラバン, Kyaraban) - 4:35
3. "Sannin no Ojisan" (三人のおじさん, The Three Uncles) (hidden track)

== Personnel ==
- Fujiwara Motoo — Guitar, vocals
- Masukawa Hiroaki — Guitar
- Naoi Yoshifumi — Bass
- Masu Hideo — Drums

== Chart performance ==
Chart	Peak Position
Billboard yearly Japan Hot 100	42
Oricon Daily Charts	1
Oricon Weekly Charts	1
Oricon Monthly Charts	2
2010 Oricon Top 100 Singles	37
