= Troublemaker (Arashi song) =

Single by Arashi

from the album Boku no Miteiru Fūkei
- B-side: "Yurase, Ima o"; "Mō Ippo"
- Released: March 3, 2010
- Recorded: 2010
- Genre: Pop
- Length: 24:24
- Label: J Storm
- Songwriters: H. Suzuki; Masashi Ohtsuki

Arashi singles chronology
"My Girl" (2009)	"Troublemaker" (2010)	"Monster" (2010)

"Troublemaker" is a song recorded by Japanese boy band Arashi. It was released on March 3, 2010 by their record label J Storm. "Troublemaker" was used as the theme song to the drama Tokujo Kabachi!! (特上カバチ!!, lit. Extraordinary Quibbling) starring Arashi member Sho Sakurai. It was released as a CD single in two formats: a regular edition containing with two B-sides and the instrumental of all the songs and a limited edition containing the B-side "Yurase, Ima o" (揺らせ、今を; "Shake It Now") and a DVD.

== Single information ==
On January 5, 2010, it was announced that Arashi would provide the song "Yurase, Ima o" as the theme song for the 2010 Winter Olympics news coverage on NTV. This was the group's third theme song for the NTV Olympic coverage, the previous two being "Hero" in 2004, and "Kaze no Mukō e" in 2008. The next day on January 6, 2010, Sakurai announced that Arashi would provide the theme song "Troublemaker" for his then-upcoming comedy drama during the drama's press conference.

== Chart performance ==
On the day of the single's release, it debuted at number-one the Oricon daily singles chart by selling about 232,000 copies. On the Oricon weekly singles chart, the single debuted at number-one and sold about 542,000 copies, making Arashi the first group to have their weekly singles sales exceed 500,000 for two consecutive years since B'z in 2001.

On June 24, 2010, "Troublemaker" placed at number-one on the Oricon first half of the year singles chart by selling 688,194 copies in the end of the year. According to Oricon, "Troublemaker" is the third best-selling single of 2010 in Japan.

== Live performances ==
On February 12, 2010, Arashi performed "Troublemaker" and "Yurase, Ima o" on Music Station's 1000th Episode Special. However, because of his work as the special newscaster for the Olympics news coverage on NTV, Sakurai could not attend the live music show as he had to go to Vancouver for the opening ceremony. Having finished his work with the Olympics, Sakurai performed "Troublemaker" with the other members of Arashi when they once again went on Music Station on March 5, 2010.

== Track listing ==
Regular edition
No.	Title	Lyrics	Music	Arrangement	Length
1.	"Troublemaker"	H. Suzuki	Masashi Ohtsuki	Ha-j	4:03
2.	"Yurase, Ima o" (揺らせ、今を "Shake It Now")	100+	100+	100+	4:27
3.	"Mō Ippo" (もう一歩 "One More Step")	Sts	Sts	Sts	3:43
4.	"Troublemaker" (Instrumental)	Suzuki	Ohtsuki	Ha-j	4:03
5.	"Yurase, Ima o" (Instrumental)	100+	100+	100+	4:27
6.	"Mō Ippo" (Instrumental)	Sts	Sts	Sts	3:41
Total length:					24:24

Limited edition
No.	Title	Lyrics	Music	Arrangement	Length
1.	"Troublemaker"	Suzuki	Ohtsuki	Ha-j	4:03
2.	"Yurase, Ima o"	100+	100+	100+	4:27
Total length:					8:28

Limited edition – DVD
No.	Title	Length
1.	"Troublemaker" (PV)
2.	"Troublemaker" (Making-of)

== Charts and certifications ==
=== Weekly charts ===
Weekly chart performance for "Troublemaker"
Chart (2010)	Peak position
Japan (Oricon Singles Chart)	1
Japan (Japan Hot 100)	1
South Korea (Gaon)	7
South Korea International (Gaon)	2

=== Year-end charts ===
Year-end chart performance for "Troublemaker"
Chart (2010)	Position
Japan (Oricon Singles Chart)	3
Japan (Japan Hot 100)	1
Japan Adult Contemporary (Billboard)	61

=== Certifications ===
Certifications for "Troublemaker"
Region	Certification	Certified units/sales
Japan (RIAJ)	2× Platinum	701,356

== Release history ==
Release history and formats for "Troublemaker"
Region	Date	Format	Distributor
Japan	March 3, 2010	CD single (JACA-5192); CD+DVD (JACA-5190)	J Storm
South Korea	March 17, 2010	CD single (SMJTCD345); CD+DVD (SMJTCD344/B)	SM Entertainment
Taiwan	March 26, 2010	CD single (JAJSG27027); CD+DVD (JAJSG27027/A)	Avex Taiwan
Hong Kong	April 9, 2010	CD single CD+DVD	Avex Asia
