= Billboard Japan Hot 100 =

Japanese record chart for songs

The Billboard Japan Hot 100 is a record chart in Japan for songs. It has been compiled by Billboard Japan and Hanshin Contents Link since February 2008. The chart is updated every Wednesday at Billboard-japan.com (JST) and every Thursday at Billboard.com (UTC).

The first number-one song on the chart was "Stay Gold" by Hikaru Utada on the issue dated January 16, 2008. The first number-one song on the chart by a non-Japanese artist was "Bleeding Love" by Leona Lewis in the issue dated April 30, 2008. The current number-one on the chart as of the issue dated November 18, 2026, is "Love Reason" by Genin wa Jibun ni Aru.

== Methodology ==
From the chart's inception in 2008, to December 2010, the chart combined CD single sales data from SoundScan Japan, tracking sales at physical stores across Japan, and radio airplay figures from Japan's then 32 AM and FM radio stations sourced from the Japanese company Plantech. In December 2010, the chart expanded to include sales from online stores, as well as sales from iTunes Japan. From December 2013, Billboard incorporated more digital music stores (such as Recochoku and Mora) into the chart. Billboard also added two additional factors: tweets relating to songs from Twitter data collected by NTT DATA, as well as data sourced from Gracenote on the number of times a CDs has been registered as being inserted into a computer. In May 2015, the chart began to include both on-demand streams and YouTube views. Finally, in November 2018, the chart began to include karaoke plays in its formula. In December 2022, the Twitter and Gracenote metrics were removed from the chart.

From December 7, 2016, onwards, Billboard Japan teamed up with GfK Japan to distribute digital sales of each track on the Hot 100 chart (between the positions of number one to number 50) to the public. The companies will distribute the sales from over 3,900 digital stores nationwide, alongside streaming services with Apple Music, Awa and Line Music, which will commence in 2017 and will be recognized as points (similar to album-equivalent sales). In June 2025, Billboard Japan introduced the recurrent rule for Japan Hot 100, alongside the Hot Albums, applying for songs that chart more than 52 weeks. It effected on the chart week of June 4, 2025.

== Lists of Billboard Japan number-one singles ==
=== Weekly number ones ===
2008 2009 2010 2011 2012 2013 2014 2015 2016 2017 2018 2019 2020 2021 2022 2023 2024 2025 2026

=== Year-end number ones ===
Year	Title	Artist(s)
2008	"Kiseki"	Greeeen
2009	"Ichibu to Zenbu"	B'z
2010	"Troublemaker"	Arashi
2011	"Everyday, Katyusha"	AKB48
2012	"Manatsu no Sounds Good!"	AKB48
2013	"Koi Suru Fortune Cookie"	AKB48
2014	"Guts!"	Arashi
2015	"Ryusei"	Sandaime J Soul Brothers from Exile Tribe
2016	"Tsubasa wa Iranai"	AKB48
2017	"Koi"	Gen Hoshino
2018	"Lemon"	Kenshi Yonezu
2019	"Lemon"	Kenshi Yonezu
2020	"Yoru ni Kakeru"	Yoasobi
2021	"Dry Flower"	Yuuri
2022	"Zankyōsanka"	Aimer
2023	"Idol"	Yoasobi
2024	"Bling-Bang-Bang-Born"	Creepy Nuts
2025	"Lilac"	Mrs. Green Apple

== Song milestones ==
=== Most weeks at number one ===
No. of weeks	Song	Artist	Release year	Ref.
22	"Idol"	Yoasobi	2023	
19	"Bling-Bang-Bang-Born"	Creepy Nuts	2024	
14	"Iris Out"	Kenshi Yonezu	2025	
13	"Subtitle"	Official Hige Dandism	2022	
13	"Show"	Ado	2023	
11	"Koi"	Gen Hoshino	2016	
9	"Zankyōsanka"	Aimer	2021	
8	"Homura"	Lisa	2020	
7	"Lemon"	Kenshi Yonezu	2018	
7	"Pretender"	Official Hige Dandism	2019	
7	"I Love..."	Official Hige Dandism	2020	
7	"Lilac"	Mrs. Green Apple	2024	

=== Most total weeks on the Billboard Japan Hot 100 ===
Legend
	Currently charting in the top 100
‡	Currently charting in the top 10

- Only the top 30 songs with the most weeks are included

No. of weeks	Song	Artist	Peak	Release year
414	"Marigold"	Aimyon	1	2018
391	"Takane no Hanako-san"	Back Number	3	2013
367	"Tenbyō no Uta"	Mrs. Green Apple featuring Sonoko Inoue	16	2018
351	"Lemon"	Kenshi Yonezu	1	2018
347	"Ao to Natsu"	Mrs. Green Apple	7	2018
326	"Pretender"	Official Hige Dandism	1	2019
277	"Kaijū no Hanauta"	Vaundy	2	2020
275	"Suiheisen"	Back Number	2	2021
253	"Yoru ni Kakeru"	Yoasobi	1	2019
247	"115 Man Kilo no Film"	Official Hige Dandism	11	2018
240	"Dry Flower"	Yuuri	2	2020
238	"Inferno"	Mrs. Green Apple	17	2019
236	"Hakujitsu"	King Gnu	2	2019
231	"Boku no Koto"	Mrs. Green Apple	7	2019
226	"Wherever You Are"	One Ok Rock	4	2010
214	"Gunjō"	Yoasobi	6	2020
213	"Soranji"	Mrs. Green Apple	10	2022
194	"Happy End"	Back Number	4	2016
188	"Shape of You"	Ed Sheeran	4	2017
186	"Kanade"	Sukima Switch	27	2004
182	"Que Sera Sera"	Mrs. Green Apple	3	2023
178	"I Love..."	Official Hige Dandism	1	2020
177	"Dance Hall"	Mrs. Green Apple	8	2022
176	"Kaibutsu"	Yoasobi	2	2021
173	"Betelgeuse"	Yuuri	2	2021
171	"Cinderella Boy"	Saucy Dog	4	2021
167	"W / X / Y"	Tani Yuuki	3	2021
166	"Mela!"	Ryokuoushoku Shakai	37	2020
163	"Uchiage Hanabi"	Daoko and Kenshi Yonezu	1	2017
158	"Christmas Song"	Back Number	1	2015

=== Other songs that have charted for at least 100 weeks ===
No. of weeks	Song	Artist	Peak	Release year
158	"Kirari"	Fujii Kaze	2	2021
157	"Hanataba"	Back Number	3	2011
157	"Himawari no Yakusoku"	Motohiro Hata	2	2014
149	"Silent Majority"	Keyakizaka46	1	2016
147	"Just a Sunny Day for You"	Yorushika	22	2018
146	"Kimi wa Rock o Kikanai"	Aimyon	11	2017
144	"Gurenge"	Lisa	2	2019
143	"Sayonara Elegy"	Masaki Suda	3	2018
141	"Wataridori"	Alexandros	3	2015
141	"Dynamite"	BTS	2	2020
140	"Shin Takarajima"	Sakanaction	1	2015
139	"Koi"	Gen Hoshino	1	2016
138	"Subtitle"	Official Hige Dandism	1	2022
136	"Lilac"	Mrs. Green Apple	1	2024
134	"Eine Kleine"	Kenshi Yonezu	19	2014
133	"Odoriko"	Vaundy	15	2021
133	"Ryusei"	Sandaime J Soul Brothers from Exile Tribe	1	2014
132	"Citrus"	Da-ice	7	2020
128	"Romanticism"	Mrs. Green Apple	11	2019
128	"Loser"	Kenshi Yonezu	3	2016
127	"Mixed Nuts"	Official Hige Dandism	1	2022
127	"Nan demo Nai yo,"	Macaroni Empitsu	4	2021
127	"Naked Heart"	Aimyon	4	2020
121	"Heroine"	Back Number	2	2015
120	"Fukakōryoku"	Vaundy	36	2020
120	"Walking with You"	Novelbright	33	2018
118	"Haru no Hi"	Aimyon	2	2019
114	"Peace Sign"	Kenshi Yonezu	1	2017
114	"Neko"	Dish//	9	2017
113	"Shake It Off"	Taylor Swift	4	2014
112	"Idol"	Yoasobi	1	2023
112	"Hanabi"	Mr. Children	1	2008
112	"TT"	Twice	3	2016
111	"Kick Back"	Kenshi Yonezu	1	2022
111	"Zankyōsanka"	Aimer	1	2021
111	"Mahō no Jūtan"	Takaya Kawasaki	20	2020
109	"No Doubt"	Official Hige Dandism	11	2018
108	"Cry Baby"	Official Hige Dandism	4	2021
107	"Kiseki"	Greeeen	1	2008
107	"Machigai Sagashi"	Masaki Suda	2	2019
105	"Magic"	Mrs. Green Apple	3	2023
105	"Billimillion"	Yuuri	6	2023
105	"Boy with Luv"	BTS featuring Halsey	7	2019
105	"We Are Never Ever Getting Back Together"	Taylor Swift	2	2012
103	"Happy"	Pharrell Williams	5	2013
103	"See You Again"	Wiz Khalifa featuring Charlie Puth	7	2015
102	"Ai o Komete Hanataba o"	Superfly	7	2008
101	"Bansanka"	Tuki	1	2023

=== Most weeks in the top ten ===
No. of weeks	Song	Artist(s)	Year(s)
82	"Lemon"	Kenshi Yonezu	2018–2019 and August 2020
78	"Dry Flower"	Yuuri	2020–2022
66	"Yoru ni Kakeru"	Yoasobi	2020–2021
65	"Pretender"	Official Hige Dandism	2019–2020
61	"Marigold"	Aimyon	2018–2019, 2026
58	"Kaijū no Hanauta"	Vaundy	2023–2024
58	"Dynamite"	BTS	2020–2021
55	"Hakujitsu"	King Gnu	2019–2020
55	"Gurenge"	Lisa	2019–2020 and January 2021
54	"Idol"	Yoasobi	2023–2024
42	"W / X / Y"	Tani Yuuki	2022–2023
41	"Shukumei"	Official Hige Dandism	2019–2020

=== Japan Hot 100 number ones by foreign artists ===
As of 2024, there have been only five Western songs that have topped the Japan Hot 100.

- Leona Lewis – "Bleeding Love"
- Mika – "Blame It on the Girls"
- Lady Gaga – "Born This Way"
- The Wanted – "Glad You Came"
- Rosé and Bruno Mars – "APT."

== See also ==
- Billboard Japan
- Billboard Japan Music Awards
- List of artists who reached number one on the Japan Hot 100
- List of K-pop songs on the Billboard Japan Hot 100
