= Kana Nishino discography =

Recordings by Japanese pop singer

- Studio albums: 7
- EPs: 3
- Compilation albums: 4
- Singles: 37
- Video albums: 8

The discography of Japanese pop singer Kana Nishino consists of seven studio albums, six compilation albums, three EPs, thirty-four singles and ten video albums. Nishino debuted in 2008 under Sony Music Japan, and gained national recognition with the singles "Tōkutemo" and "Kimi ni Aitaku Naru Kara" (2009). Nishino has released some of the most digitally successful songs in Japan: "Motto..." (2009), "Dear..." (2009), "Best Friend" (2010), "Aitakute Aitakute" (2010), "If" (2010) and "Kimi tte" (2010), all of which were certified million by the RIAJ.

Nishino Kana has scored six number-one albums. She also had numerous chart-topping hits on the digital charts, establishing herself as an admirable force on the digital music charts of her native country. Her digital sales to date has reached over 46,000,000 downloads, making her one of the most successful female artists in digital chart history. Nishino has sold over 5,000,000 physical records (singles included).

== Studio albums ==
List of albums, with selected chart positions
Title	Album details	Peak positions				Sales (JPN) (Note: Sales provided by Oricon database and are rounded to the nearest thousand copies.)	Certifications
Title	Album details	JPN	KOR Int. (Note: The Gaon Albums Chart was established in 2010.) (Note: Week references for Gaon: To Love, Thank You, Love, Love Place, Love Collection: Pink and Love Collection: Mint, With Love. Love It.)	TWN	TWN East Asia (Note: Week references for G-Music: To Love 2010 week 26, Thank You, Love 2011 week 26, Love Place 2013 week 13, Love Collection: Pink and Love Collection: Mint 2013 week 36, With Love 2014 week 46 and 2015 week 1, Secret Collection: Red.)	Sales (JPN)	Certifications
Love One.	Released: June 24, 2009; Label: SME; Formats: CD, CD/DVD, digital download	4	—	—	—	222,000	RIAJ: Platinum
To Love	Released: June 23, 2010; Label: SME; Formats: CD, CD/DVD, digital download	1	46	—	6	729,000	RIAJ: 3× Platinum
Thank You, Love	Released: June 22, 2011; Label: SME; Formats: CD, CD/DVD, digital download	1	98	14	6	379,000	RIAJ: 2× Platinum
Love Place	Released: September 5, 2012; Label: SME; Formats: CD, CD/DVD, digital download	2	19	5	1	346,000	RIAJ: Platinum
With Love	Released: November 12, 2014; Label: SME; Formats: CD, CD/DVD, digital download	1	25	19	1	267,000	RIAJ: Platinum
Just Love	Released: July 13, 2016; Label: SME; Formats: CD, CD/DVD, digital download	1	9	—	—	312,000 (Note: Combined sales figures for Just Love: 306,679 (physical sales) + 5,576 (digital sales).)	RIAJ: Platinum
Love It	Released: November 15, 2017; Label: SME; Formats: CD, CD/DVD, digital download	2	11	—	—	153,000 (Note: Combined sales figures for Love It: 142,984 (physical sales) + 9,986 (digital sales).)	RIAJ: Gold
"—" denotes items that did not chart.

== Compilation albums ==
List of albums, with selected chart positions
Title	Album details	Peak positions				Sales (JPN)	Certifications
Title	Album details	JPN	KOR Int.	TWN	TWN East Asia	Sales (JPN)	Certifications
Love Collection: Pink	Released: September 4, 2013; Label: SME; Formats: CD, CD/DVD, digital download	2	33	10	2	314,000	RIAJ: Platinum
Love Collection: Mint	Released: September 4, 2013; Label: SME; Formats: CD, CD/DVD, digital download	1	36	10	2	328,000	RIAJ: Platinum
Secret Collection: Red	Released: November 18, 2015; Label: SME; Formats: CD, CD/DVD, digital download	3	—	—N/a	16	113,000	RIAJ: Gold
Secret Collection: Green	Released: November 18, 2015; Label: SME; Formats: CD, CD/DVD, digital download	2	—	—	—	132,000	RIAJ: Gold
Love Collection 2: Pink	Released: November 21, 2018; Label: SME; Formats: CD, CD/DVD, digital download	1	20	—	—	120,000 (Note: Combined sales figures for Love Collection 2: Pink: 114,299 (physical sales) + 5,711 (digital sales).)	RIAJ: Gold
Love Collection 2: Mint	Released: November 21, 2018; Label: SME; Formats: CD, CD/DVD, digital download	2	21	—	—	111,000 (Note: Combined sales figures for Love Collection 2: Mint: 107,022 (physical sales) + 4,221 (digital sales).)	RIAJ: Gold
All Time Best: Love Collection 15th Anniversary	Released: February 14, 2024; Label: SME; Formats: CD, CD/DVD, digital download, streaming	4	—	—	—	46,894	
"—" denotes items that did not chart.

== Extended plays ==
List of extended plays, with selected chart positions
Title	Details	Peak chart positions	Sales	Certifications
Title	Details	JPN	Sales	Certifications
Love Again	Released: September 18, 2024; Label: SME; Formats: CD, CD+DVD, digital download, streaming	2	JPN: 100,365	RIAJ: Gold (phy.)
Love Beat	Released: May 27, 2026; Label: SME; Formats: CD, CD+DVD, digital download, streaming	9	JPN: 10,121	
Power of Love	Released: August 26, 2026; Label: SME; Formats: CD, digital download, streaming	17	JPN: 5,645	

== Singles ==
=== As a lead artist ===
==== 2000s ====
List of 2000s singles, with selected chart positions
Title	Year	Peak chart positions		Sales (JPN)	Certifications	Album
Title	Year	JPN	JPN Hot (Note: Sources for chart positions are as follows: "I", "Glowly Days", "Style.", "Make Up", "Tōkutemo", "Kimi ni Aitaku Naru Kara", "Kimi no Koe o", "Motto...", "Dear...", "Best Friend", "Aitakute Aitakute", "If", "Kimi tte", "Manatsu no Orion", "Distance", "By Your Side", "Esperanza", "Alright", "Tatoe Donna ni...", "Sakura, I Love You?", "Watashi-tachi", "Go for It!!", "Be Strong", "Always", "Happy Song", "Believe", "Namidairo", "Sayonara", "We Don't Stop", "Darling", "Still Love You", "Suki", "Koisuru Kimochi", "Moshi mo Unmei no Hito ga Iru no nara", "Torisetsu", "No. 1", "A-gata no Uta", "Anata no Suki na Tokoro", "Eyes on You", "With You")	Sales (JPN)	Certifications	Album
"I"	2008	155	10	500		Love One
"Glowly Days"	2008	126	22	1,000		Love One
"Style."	2008	57	67	3,000		Love One
"Make Up"	2009	119	39	700		Love One
"Tookutemo" (遠くても; "Even If You're Far Away") (featuring Wise)	2009	40	17	10,000	RIAJ (cellphone): Platinum; RIAJ (download): 2× Platinum; RIAJ (streaming): Gold	Love One
"Kimi ni Aitaku Naru Kara" (君に会いたくなるから; "Because I've Grown to Miss You")	2009	19	7	12,000	RIAJ (ringtone): 2× Platinum; RIAJ (download): 2× Platinum; RIAJ (cellphone): 2× Platinum	Love One
"Motto..." (もっと…; "More...")	2009	6	3	65,000	RIAJ (ringtone): 3× Platinum; RIAJ (download): Million; RIAJ (streaming): Gold	To Love
"Dear..."	2009	7	3	53,000	RIAJ (ringtone): 3× Platinum; RIAJ (download): Million; RIAJ (streaming): Platinum	To Love
"Maybe"	2009	7	—	53,000	RIAJ (cellphone): Gold	To Love
"—" denotes items that did not chart.

==== 2010s ====
List of 2010s singles, with selected chart positions
Title	Year	Peak chart positions				Sales (JPN)	Certifications	Album
Title	Year	JPN	JPN Hot	TWN	TWN East Asia (Note: Week references for G-Music: "Kimi tte" 2010 week 45, "Esperanza" 2011 week 21, "Tatoe Donna ni..." 2011 week 46, "Sakura, I Love You?" 2012 week 14, "Watashi-tachi" 2012 week 21, "Go for It!!" 2012 week 30, "Always" 2012 week 45, "Namidairo" 2013 week 32, "Sayonara" 2013 week 48, "We Don't Stop" 2014 week 45, "Darling" 2014 week 33, "Suki" 2014 week 43, "Torisetsu".)	Sales (JPN)	Certifications	Album
"Best Friend"	2010	3	3	—	—	71,000	RIAJ (ringtone): Million; RIAJ (download): Million; RIAJ (physical): Gold; RIAJ (streaming): Platinum	To Love
"Aitakute Aitakute" (会いたくて 会いたくて; "I Miss You, I Miss You")	2010	2	4	—	—	97,000	RIAJ (ringtone): Million; RIAJ (cellphone): Million; RIAJ (physical): Gold; RIAJ (PC): Gold; RIAJ (streaming): Platinum	To Love
"If"	2010	5	6	—	—	91,000	RIAJ (ringtone): 3× Platinum; RIAJ (download): Million; RIAJ (physical): Gold; RIAJ (streaming): Gold	Thank You, Love
"Kimi tte" (君って; "You")	2010	3	3	—	19	98,000	RIAJ (ringtone): Million; RIAJ (download): Million; RIAJ (physical): Gold; RIAJ (streaming): Gold	Thank You, Love
"Distance"	2011	3	3	—	—	61,000	RIAJ (ringtone): 2× Platinum; RIAJ (cellphone): Platinum; RIAJ (physical): Gold	Thank You, Love
"Esperanza"	2011	5	5	—	20	47,000	RIAJ (download): 2× Platinum	Thank You, Love
"Tatoe Donna ni..." (たとえ どんなに…; "No Matter If")	2011	5	5	—	6	64,000	RIAJ (ringtone): 2× Platinum; RIAJ (download): 3× Platinum; RIAJ (physical): Gold; RIAJ (streaming): Gold	Love Place
"Sakura, I Love You?"	2012	6	4	—	6	54,000	RIAJ (download): Platinum	Love Place
"Watashi-tachi" (私たち; "Us")	2012	6	7	—	8	53,000	RIAJ (download): Platinum	Love Place
"Go for It!!"	2012	7	6	—	7	45,000	RIAJ (download): 2× Platinum; RIAJ (streaming): Gold	Love Place
"Always"	2012	6	6	20	4	40,000	RIAJ (PC): Gold; RIAJ (streaming): Gold	Love Collection: Mint
"Believe"	2013	7	7	—	—	39,000	RIAJ (download): Platinum; RIAJ (streaming): Gold	Love Collection: Mint
"Namidairo" (涙色; "Tear-colored")	2013	14	5	18	3	28,000	RIAJ (download): Platinum	Love Collection: Pink
"Sayonara" (さよなら; "Goodbye")	2013	4	3	—	6	43,000	RIAJ (download): Platinum	With Love
"We Don't Stop"	2014	2	2	—	6	33,000	RIAJ (download): Platinum	With Love
"Darling"	2014	6	2	16	6	42,000	RIAJ (download): 3× Platinum; RIAJ (streaming): Gold	With Love
"Suki" (好き; "Love")	2014	9	4	—	8	25,000	RIAJ (download): Platinum	With Love
"Moshi mo Unmei no Hito ga Iru no nara" (もしも運命の人がいるのなら; "What If I Had a Soulmate")	2015	11	2	—N/a	—	41,000	RIAJ (download): 2× Platinum; RIAJ (streaming): Gold	Just Love
"Torisetsu" (トリセツ; "User Manual")	2015	6	1	—N/a	6	74,000	RIAJ (download): Million; RIAJ (physical): Gold; RIAJ (streaming): Platinum	Just Love
"Anata no Sukina Tokoro" (あなたの好きなところ; "Things I Like About You")	2016	5	2	—N/a	—	33,000	RIAJ (download): Gold	Just Love
"Dear Bride"	2016	9	5	—N/a	—	37,000	RIAJ (download): Platinum; RIAJ (streaming): Gold	Love It
"Pa" (パッ)	2017	5	3	—N/a	—	25,000	RIAJ (download): Gold	Love It
"Girls"	2017	7	11	—N/a	—	21,000		Love It
"Te Wo Tsunagu Riyuu" (手をつなぐ理由; "Reason to Hold Hands")	2017	7	6	—N/a	—	20,000		Love It
"I Love You" (アイラブユー)	2018	8	4	—	—	25,000	RIAJ (streaming): Gold	Love Collection 2: Pink
"Bedtime Story"	2018	7	6	—	—	25,000	RIAJ (download): Gold	Love Collection 2: Mint
"—" denotes items that did not chart.

==== 2020s ====
List of 2020s singles, with selected chart positions
Title	Year	Peak chart positions		Sales (JPN)	Certifications	Album
Title	Year	JPN Comb	JPN Hot	Sales (JPN)	Certifications	Album
"Eyes on You"	2024	22	16			Love Again
"With You"	2025	—	77			—N/a
"Magical Starshine Makeup"	2025	—	—			—N/a
"Kiminosei"	2026	—	—			—N/a
"Love Beat" (featuring NiziU)	2026	—	34			Love Beat
"Power of Love"	2026	—	TBA	TBA		—N/a
"—" denotes items that did not chart.

=== As a collaborating artist ===
List of singles, with selected chart positions
Title	Year	Peak chart positions			Sales (JPN)	Certifications	Album
Title	Year	JPN	JPN Hot	JPN RIAJ (Note: The RIAJ Digital Track Chart is a depreciated chart that ran from 2009 until early 2012 and tracked full-length cellphone downloads.) (Note: Sources for chart positions are as follows: "Aenakutemo", "Shitsuren Mode", "Kimi no Koe o", "Tōkutemo/Kimi Ai/Kimi Koe Mega Mix", "Yours Only", "Missing You", "One Way Love", "Kon'ya wa Party Up", "Love Is Blind", "Grab Bag", "Love & Smile", "Summer Girl", "You Are the One", "Konomama", "I'll Be There", "Beautiful", "Christmas Love", "Girls Girls", "Manatsu no Orion", "Beloved", "By Your Side", "Call Me Up", "Alright", "Clap Clap!!", "Flower", "Together", "Just the Way You Are", "Secret", "My Baby", "Sweet Sweet", "Happy Half Year!" "Love Like Crazy".)	Sales (JPN)	Certifications	Album
"Aenakute mo" (会えなくても; "Even If We Can't Meet") (Wise featuring Kana Nishino)	2009	—	—	9			Love Quest
"Brave Heart" (Nerdhead featuring Kana Nishino)	2010	24	— (Note: Charted at number 19 on the Billboard Japan Hot Singles Sales chart.)	—	10,500		Beginning of the End
"Manatsu no Orion" (真冬のオリオン; "Midsummer Orion") (Infinity 16 welcomez Minmi & Kana Nishino)	2010	—	47	3			Infinity 16 Best
"By Your Side" (Wise featuring Kana Nishino)	2011	20	21	4	7,400	RIAJ (cellphone): Gold; RIAJ (digital): Platinum	Heart Connection: Best Collaborations
"—" denotes items that did not chart.

=== Promotional singles ===
List of promotional singles with selected chart positions
Title	Year	Peak chart positions		Certifications	Album
Title	Year	JPN Hot	JPN RIAJ	Certifications	Album
"Kimi no Koe o" (君の声を; "Your Voice") (featuring Verbal (M-Flo)	2009	55	5	RIAJ (cellphone): Platinum	Love One
"Yours Only," (featuring Wise)	2009	—	4		Tribute: Maison de M-Flo
"Alright"	2011	34	4	RIAJ (download): Gold	Thank You, Love
"Be Strong"	2012	33	—	RIAJ (download): Gold	Love Place
"Koisuru Kimochi" (恋する気持ち; "Loving Feeling")	2014	91	—		With Love
"No. 1"	2015	3	—	RIAJ (download): Platinum; RIAJ (streaming): Gold	Secret Collection: Green
"A-gata no Uta" (A型のうた; "Blood Type-A Song")	2015	43	—		Secret Collection: Red (Note: Originally featured on the "Torisetsu" single in September 2015, "A-gata no Uta" was the leading promotional song for Secret Collection: Red.)
"You & Me"	2016	34	—		Just Love
"Have a Nice Day"	2016	4	—	RIAJ (download): Gold	Just Love
"Kimi ga Suki" (君が好き; "I Like You")	2016	26	—	RIAJ (download): Gold	Just Love
"—" denotes items that did not chart.

=== Other charted songs ===
List of other songs with selected chart positions
Title	Year	Peak chart positions		Certifications	Album
Title	Year	JPN Hot (Note: Sources for chart positions are as follows: "Still Love You", "Kimi Ga Suki", "One More Time".)	JPN RIAJ	Certifications	Album
"Shitsuren Mode" (失恋モード; "Broken Heart Mode") (featuring Wise)	2009	—	25		"Kimi ni Aitaku Naru Kara" (single)
"Tōkutemo/Kimi Ai/Kimi Koe Mega Mix" (遠くても～君会い～君声 MEGA☆MIX; "No Matter How Far/Miss You/Your Voice Mega Mix")	2009	—	62		Non-album song
"Missing You"	2009	—	14		"Motto..." (single)
"One Way Love"	2010	—	2	RIAJ (cellphone): Gold	"Best Friend" (single)
"Kon'ya wa Party Up" (今夜はPARTY UP; "Party Up Tonight")	2010	—	18		"Best Friend" (single)
"Love Is Blind"	2010	—	3	RIAJ (download): Platinum	"Aitakute Aitakute" (single)
"Grab Bag"	2010	—	77		"Aitakute Aitakute" (single)
"Love & Smile"	2010	—	5	RIAJ (download): Gold	To Love
"Summer Girl" (featuring Minmi)	2010	—	8		To Love
"Kono Mama de" (このままで; "Just Like It Is Now")	2010	—	8	RIAJ (cellphone): Platinum; RIAJ (streaming): Platinum	To Love
"You Are the One"	2010	—	64		To Love
"I'll Be There"	2010	—	28		"If" (single)
"Beautiful"	2010	—	20		"If" (single)
"Christmas Love"	2010	—	9		"Kimi tte" (single)
"Girls Girls"	2010	—	50		"Kimi tte" (single)
"Beloved"	2011	—	9		"Distance" (single)
"Call Me Up"	2011	—	90		"Distance" (single)
"Clap Clap!!"	2011	—	32		Thank You, Love
"Flower"	2011	—	22		Thank You, Love
"Together"	2011	—	65		Thank You, Love
"Just the Way You Are"	2011	—	46		"Tatoe Donna ni..." (single)
"Secret"	2011	—	58		"Tatoe Donna ni..." (single)
"My Baby"	2012	—	24		"Sakura, I Love You?" (single)
"Sweet Sweet"	2012	—	50		"Sakura, I Love You?" (single)
"Happy Half Year!"	2012	—	8		"Watashi-tachi" (single)
"Love Like Crazy"	2012	—	24		"Watashi-tachi" (single)
"Happy Song"	2012	22	—	RIAJ (PC): Gold	"Always" (single)
"Still Love You"	2014	83	—		"Darling" (single)
"One More Time"	2017	91	—		"Te Wo Tsunagu Riyuu" (single)
"—" denotes items that did not chart. The RIAJ chart was discontinued in 2012.

== Other appearances ==
List of non-studio album or guest appearances that feature Kana Nishino
Title	Year	Album
"I Love Koi" (I♥恋; "I Love Love") (Karutetto featuring Kana Nishino)	2009	L.I.F.E. 2
"Kono Kyoku Tomaru Made wa..." (この曲止まるまでは…; "I Love Love") (Taro Soul featuring Kana Nishino)	2009	Soul Spiral

== Video albums ==
List of media, with selected chart positions
Title	Album details	Peak positions		
Title	Album details	JPN DVD	JPN Blu-ray	TWN (Note: Week references for G-Music: Kanayan Tour 2011: Summer 2011 week 50, Love Voyage: A Place of My Heart 2012 week 51, Kanayan Tour 2012: Arena 2013 week 16, MTV Unplugged Kana Nishino 2013 week 51.)
Kanayan Tour 2011: Summer	Released: December 7, 2011; Label: Sony; Formats: DVD, Blu-ray	4	9	7
Love Voyage: A Place of My Heart	Released: December 19, 2012; Label: Sony; Formats: DVD, Blu-ray	6	45	4
Kanayan Tour 2012: Arena	Released: April 17, 2013; Label: Sony; Formats: DVD, Blu-ray	2	7	2
MTV Unplugged Kana Nishino	Released: December 18, 2013; Label: Sony; Formats: DVD, Blu-ray	10	16	3
Love Collection Tour: Pink & Mint	Released: July 9, 2014; Label: Sony; Formats: DVD, Blu-ray	2	3	—
With Love Tour	Released: February 3, 2016; Label: Sony; Formats: DVD, Blu-ray	2	2	—
Just Love Tour	Released: April 12, 2017; Label: Sony; Formats: DVD, Blu-ray	1	4	—
Dome Tour 2017 "Many Thanks"	Released: February 21, 2018; Label: Sony; Formats: DVD, Blu-ray	2	8	—
National Arena Tour 2018 "LOVE it Tour ~10th Anniversary~"	Released: December 26, 2018; Label: Sony; Formats: DVD, Blu-ray	3	7	—
Love Collection Live 2019	Released: April 24, 2019; Label: Sony; Formats: DVD, Blu-ray	1	6	—
MV Collection: All Time Best 15th Anniversary	Released: February 14, 2024; Label: Sony; Formats: DVD, Blu-ray	2	3	—
Love Again Live 2024	Released: March 5, 2025; Label: Sony; Formats: DVD, Blu-ray	4	4	—
Fall In Love With You Again Tour 2025	Released: November 11, 2025; Label: Sony; Formats: DVD, Blu-ray	2	3	—
"—" denotes items that did not chart.
