= MTV Video Music Award Japan for Best Karaokee! Song =

Annual Japanese music award

Best Karaokee! Song (最優秀カラオケソング賞)

== Results ==
The following table displays the nominees and the winners in bold print with a yellow background.

=== 2010s ===
Year	Artist	Video
**2008** (7th)	**Exile**	**"Toki no Kakera" (時の描片?トキノカケラ)**
**2008** (7th)	Avril Lavigne	"Girlfriend"
**2008** (7th)	Mika Nakashima	"Life"
**2008** (7th)	Shōnan no Kaze	"Suirenka" (睡蓮花)
**2008** (7th)	Ne-Yo	"Because of You"
**2009** (8th)	**Kimaguren**	**"Life"**
**2009** (8th)	Aqua Timez	"Niji" (虹)
**2009** (8th)	Mariah Carey	"Touch My Body"
**2009** (8th)	Coldplay	"Viva La Vida"
**2009** (8th)	Funky Monkey Babys	"Kibou no Uta" (希望の唄)
**2010** (9th)	**Miliyah Kato featuring Shota Shimizu**	**"Love Forever"**
**2010** (9th)	The Black Eyed Peas	"I Gotta Feeling"
**2010** (9th)	Kaela Kimura	"Butterfly"
**2010** (9th)	Lady Gaga	"Poker Face"
**2010** (9th)	Kana Nishino	"Motto..." (もっと・・・)
**2011** (10th)
**2011** (10th)	**Girls' Generation**	**"Tell Me Your Wish (Genie)"**
**2011** (10th)	Avril Lavigne	"Alice"
**2011** (10th)	Ikimono-gakari	"Arigatō" (ありがとう)
**2011** (10th)	Justin Bieber featuring Ludacris	"Baby"
**2011** (10th)	Kana Nishino	"Kimi tte" (君って)
**2012** (11th)	**Sonar Pocket**	**"365 Nichi no Love Story." (365日のラブストーリー。)**
**2012** (11th)	Ayaka	"Hajimari no Toki" (はじまりのとき)
**2012** (11th)	Che'Nelle	"Baby I Love U"
**2012** (11th)	Lady Gaga	"Judas"
**2012** (11th)	Kana Nishino	"Esperanza"
**2013** (12th)	Bruno Mars	"Locked Out of Heaven"
**2013** (12th)	Kyary Pamyu Pamyu	"Fashion Monster" (ファッションモンスター)
**2013** (12th)	Kana Nishino	"Always"
**2013** (12th)	Taylor Swift	"We Are Never Ever Getting Back Together"
**2013** (12th)	Sandaime J Soul Brothers from Exile Tribe	"Fireworks" (花火)
