= 2011 MTV Video Music Aid Japan =

Annual Japanese music awards ceremony

- Date: June 25, 2011
- Location: Makuhari Messe
- Hosted by: AKB48; Wei Son; Kozue Akimoto, Marie Ishikawa, Shion Miyawaki from Shibuhara Girls

Television/radio coverage
- Network: MTV Japan

The 2011 MTV Video Music Aid Japan were held in Chiba on June 25, 2011, at the Makuhari Messe. The VMAJ were the culmination of MTV Japan's Music of Hope campaign, the channel's multiplatform response to the 2011 Tōhoku earthquake and tsunami. The 2011 awards were marked the ten-year anniversary of the MTV Video Music Awards Japan.

On May 1, a pre-event to promote the awards was held, starting at 4 pm (JST) at the Yoyogi National Gymnasium. Performers included the singer Nishino Kana and the boy band MBLAQ. Additionally, MTV Japan donated 10 Yens per vote to the Japanese Red Cross.

Lady Gaga opened the show trapped in a giant spider web for her performance of "The Edge of Glory", the latest single from her third album Born This Way. Later, Gaga climbed to the top of the stage to a custom-made spider-shaped piano inspired by Maman, the ten-metre Louise Bourgeois sculpture located in Roppongi Hills in Tokyo, and performed "Born This Way".

The winners were announced on July 2, on a special program. The big winner was Lady Gaga with three awards, including Video of the Year, Best Female Video and Best Dance Video.

== Awards ==
=== Video of the Year ===
Lady Gaga — "Born This Way"

- Namie Amuro — "Break It"
- Katy Perry featuring Snoop Dogg — "California Gurls"
- Girls' Generation — "Tell Me Your Wish (Genie)"
- Hikaru Utada — "Goodbye Happiness"

=== Album of the Year ===
Kana Nishino — To Love

- Eminem — Recovery
- Miliyah Kato — Heaven
- Linkin Park — A Thousand Suns
- Yui — Holidays in the Sun

=== Best Male Video ===
Bruno Mars — "Just the Way You Are"

- B.o.B. (feat. Hayley Williams) – Airplanes
- Kanye West featuring Pusha T — "Runaway"
- Saito Kazuyoshi — "Zutto Suki Datta"
- Shota Shimizu — "You & I"

=== Best Female Video ===
Lady Gaga — "Born This Way"

- Miliyah Kato — "X.O.X.O."
- Rihanna — "Only Girl (In the World)"
- Taylor Swift — "Mine"
- Yui — "Rain"

=== Best Group Video ===
Girls' Generation — "Tell Me Your Wish (Genie)"

- The Black Eyed Peas — "The Time (Dirty Bit)"
- Ikimono-gakari — "Arigatō"
- Linkin Park — "The Catalyst"
- W-inds — "Let's Get It On"

=== Best New Artist ===
Justin Bieber featuring Ludacris — "Baby"

- B.o.B featuring Bruno Mars — "Nothin' on You"
- Naoto Inti Raymi — "Takaramono (Kono Koe ga Naku Naru Made)"
- Sandaime J Soul Brothers — "On Your Mark (Hikari no Kiseki)"
- Shinsei Kamattechan — "Michinaru Hou e"

=== Best Rock Video ===
Tokio Hotel — "Dark Side of the Sun"

- Linkin Park — "The Catalyst"
- One Ok Rock — "Jibun Rock"
- Radwimps — "Dada"
- Vampire Weekend — "Cousins

=== Best Pop Video ===
Ikimono-gakari — "Arigatō"

- Juju — "Kono Yoru o Tomete yo"
- Katy Perry featuring Snoop Dogg — "California Gurls"
- Kana Nishino — "Kimi tte"
- Taylor Swift — "Mine"

=== Best R&B Video ===
Rihanna — "Only Girl (In the World)"

- Ai — "Nemurenai Machi"
- Miliyah Kato — "X.O.X.O."
- Ne-Yo — "Champagne Life"
- Usher featuring will.i.am — "OMG"

=== Best Hip-Hop Video ===
Eminem — "Not Afraid"

- AK-69 — "Public Enemy"
- Far East Movement featuring Cataracs and Dev — "Like a G6"
- Kanye West — "Power"
- Seeda — "This Is How We Do It"

=== Best Reggae Video ===
Iyaz — "Replay"

- Fire Ball — "Dreamer"
- Han-Kun — "Touch The Sky"
- Nas and Damian Marley — "As We Enter"
- Ryo the Skywalker — "Taiyou Ni Naritai Yo"

=== Best Dance Video ===
Lady Gaga — "Born This Way"

- Dorian — "Morning Calling"
- Mark Ronson & The Business Intl. featuring Q-Tip and MNDR — "Bang Bang Bang"
- The Backwoods — "Flying Bugz"
- Underworld — "Always Loved a Film"

=== Best Video from a film ===
Avril Lavigne — "Alice" (from Alice in Wonderland)

- Asian Kung–Fu Generation — "Solanin" (from Solanin)
- Daft Punk — "Derezzed" (from Tron: Legacy)
- Flumpool — "Kimi ni Todoke" (from Kimi ni Todoke)
- Justin Bieber featuring Jaden Smith — "Never Say Never" (from The Karate Kid)

=== Best Collaboration ===
Eminem featuring Rihanna — "Love the Way You Lie"

- Ai featuring Namie Amuro – "Fake"
- Brahman + Ego-Wrappin' – "We Are Here"
- Katy Perry featuring Snoop Dogg — "California Gurls"
- Nicki Minaj featuring will.i.am — "Check It Out"

=== Best Karaokee! Song ===
Girls' Generation — "Tell Me Your Wish (Genie)"

- Avril Lavigne — "Alice"
- Ikimono-gakari — "Arigatō"
- Justin Bieber featuring Ludacris — "Baby"
- Kana Nishino — "Kimi tte"

== Live performances ==
- Lady Gaga — "The Edge of Glory" / "Born This Way"
- AKB48 — "Beginner" / "Everyday, Kachūsha" / "Heavy Rotation"
- Girls' Generation — "The Great Escape" / "Mr. Taxi"
- Shinee — "Replay (Kimi wa Boku no Everything)"
- Monkey Majik— "Mahou no Kotoba"
- Namie Amuro featuring Ai and Anna Tsuchiya — "Wonder Women"
- Kana Nishino — "Esperanza" / "Kimi tte"
- Tokio Hotel — "Dark Side of the Sun" / "Monsoon"
- Exile — "Victory" / "I Wish For You"

== Guest celebrities ==
- Ai
- AKB48
- Thelma Aoyama
- Beni
- Yuya Matsushita
- MiChi
- Naoto Inti Raymi
- The Shibuhara Girls
- Anna Tsuchiya
- Verbal
- W-inds
