= Dear.../Maybe =

"Dear…/Maybe"

Single by Kana Nishino

from the album To Love
- A-side: Dear…; Maybe
- B-side: "Yours Only," feat. Wise
- Released: December 2, 2009
- Recorded: 2009
- Genre: J-pop
- Label: SME Records
- Songwriters: Kana Nishino, Giorgio Cancemi

Kana Nishino singles chronology
"Motto…" (2009)	"Dear…/Maybe" (2009)	"Best Friend" (2010)

"Dear…/Maybe" is a double A-side released by Japanese pop and R&B singer-songwriter Kana Nishino. It was released on December 2, 2009, by her record label SME Records. "Dear..." was written and composed by Nishino, Giorgio Cancemi and Shinquo Ogura, while "Maybe" was written and composed by Nishino and Cancemi. Musically, "Dear..." is a pop ballad influenced by R&B music, while "Maybe" is an upbeat synthpop song. Both tracks were used to promote NTT Docomo's "Ganbare Jikkou '09-'10" campaign and Maybelline New York, respectively.

Both songs were well received by music critics, with praise going towards the production. Commercially, "Dear.../Maybe" performed well on record charts. It reached number seven on the Oricon Singles Chart, while "Dear..." individually charted at number one and number three respectively on the RIAJ Digital Track Chart and the Japan Hot 100. "Dear..." was certified both triple platinum and million by the Recording Industry Association of Japan (RIAJ) for ringtone and digital sales. "Maybe" was certified gold for selling over 100,000 full-length downloads. "Dear..." has been performed on some of Nishino's tours, including Love Collection Tour ~pink & mint~, Just LOVE Tour and Kana Nishino Dome Tour 2017 "Many Thanks."

== Background and composition ==
After the success of "Motto...," Sony Music Japan announced the release of a new single titled "Dear.../Maybe" on November 6, 2009. "Dear..." was made available as a ringtone on November 11, 2009, and as a full-length download on November 26, 2009. "Maybe" was released as a full-length download on December 2, 2009. Sony Music Japan also distributed the CD single for "Dear.../Maybe" on the same day. "Dear..." was written by Nishino and composed by Giorgio Cancemi and Shinquo Ogura; "Maybe" was written by Nishino and Cancemi, while composition was handled by Cancemi and Ogura. The B-side "Yours Only" feat. Wise was featured on M-Flo's 10th anniversary tribute album, Tribute: Maison de M-Flo.

Musically, "Dear..." is an R&B-influenced pop ballad that expresses the affectionate feelings towards a loved one. "Maybe" is an urban club-style up-tempo song that makes full use of vocal effects; it depicts the delicate emotions of a "current girlfriend" who cannot shake off the presence of an ex-girlfriend.

== Chart performance ==
Commercially, "Dear.../Maybe" experienced success in Japan. On the Billboard Japan Hot 100 chart with the issue date December 2, 2009, "Dear…" appeared on the chart at number 92. The following week "Dear…" peaked at number three jumping 89 spots. "Dear..." was certified triple platinum by the RIAJ for selling over 750,000 ringtones, while also being certified million for selling over one million full-length downloads. "Maybe" was certified gold for selling over 100,000 cellphone downloads.

== Music videos and promotion ==
"Dear..." was the official song for the DoCoMo's "Ganbare Jikkou '09 - '10" campaign, which was meant to support students taking exams. Nishino commented on this song: "I also took the exam a few years ago, and learned a lot, such as the difficulty of facing a hurdle for the first time in my life, the importance of the people who supported me there, and the change in myself when I overcame that hurdle. I am truly honored to be able to write a song with a message for all the exam takers in this way." Meanwhile, "Maybe" was used as the commercial song for Maybelline New York's "Express Magnum Volume" advertisement starring herself.

== Track listing ==
No.	Title	Lyrics	Music	Arranger(s)	Length
1.	"Dear…" (Dear…)	Kana Nishino	Giorgio Cancemi; Shinquo Ogura	Giorgio Cancemi	5:31
2.	"Maybe"	Kana Nishino, Giorgio Cancemi	Shinquo Ogura, Giorgio Cancemi	Giorgio Cancemi	4:07
3.	"Yours Only," (feat. Wise: Maison de M-Flo)	Lisa, Verbal and Taku, Additional Words： Wise	Lisa, Verbal and Taku, Wise	Giorgio Cancemi	6:17

== Charts ==
=== Weekly charts ===
Chart (2009)	Peak position
Billboard Japan Hot 100	3
Oricon Weekly Singles Chart	7
RIAJ Digital Track Chart weekly top 100	1
RIAJ Digital Track Chart weekly top 100: "Maybe"	5

=== Year-end charts ===
Chart (2010)	Position
RIAJ Digital Track Chart yearly top 100	13

== Certifications ==
Certifications for "Dear..."
Region	Certification	Certified units/sales
Japan (RIAJ) ringtone	3× Platinum	750,000^{*}
Japan (RIAJ) digital	Million	1,000,000^{*}
Streaming
Japan (RIAJ)	Platinum	100,000,000^{†}
^{*} Sales figures based on certification alone.^{†} Streaming-only figures based on certification alone.

Certifications for "Maybe"
Region	Certification	Certified units/sales
Japan (RIAJ) Full-length ringtone	Gold	100,000^{*}
^{*} Sales figures based on certification alone.
