= Aitakute Aitakute =

Single by Kana Nishino

from the album To Love
- B-side: "Love Is Blind"; "Grab Bag"
- Released: May 19, 2010
- Genre: J-pop, R&B
- Length: 4:43
- Label: SME Records
- Songwriters: Kana Nishino, Giorgio Cancemi
- Producer: Giorgio Cancemi

Kana Nishino singles chronology
"Best Friend" (2010)	"Aitakute Aitakute" (2010)	"If" (2010)

Alternative cover
- First press cover

"Aitakute Aitakute" (会いたくて 会いたくて, I Miss You, I Miss You) is a song by Japanese pop singer Kana Nishino. It was released as her 10th single on May 19, 2010. The song is produced by Giorgio Cancemi, writer of many of Nishino's hit songs (such as "Best Friend," "Motto..." and "Tōkutemo"). The B-side "Love Is Blind" is produced by contemporary R&B producer Hiro. Hiro produced "One Way Love," the B-side to Nishino's previous single "Best Friend."

The single is to date one of Nishino's most commercially successful; peaking at number two on the Oricon Singles Chart and number one on the RIAJ Digital Track Chart. "Aitakute Aitakute" is one of the best-selling multi-format singles in Japan, with over 5,097,000 combined sales and Japan's best selling digital download of 2010.

== Critical reception ==
Aitakute Aitakute uses the phrase "I want to see you, I want to see you, I tremble" in the beginning and chorus. Mynavi News praised this as "One of the characteristics of Kana Nishino's lyrics, which uses familiar words that are easy to jump into the heart." With the song being a hit, SPA! reported that "Kana Nishino is a pioneer in the world of 'I want to meet you and tremble'", and AOL News reported that "She created the killer phrase 'I want to meet you and tremble,' and created an unwavering brand." The CD Journal's mini-review praised the song, saying, "The lyrics directly reflect real heartbreak, and the achingly painful lyrics are colored with a delicate sound that incorporates piano and strings as the essence of the song."

In an interview, Nishino stated that her own view of love is in contrast to that of this song.

== Chart performance ==
On the Oricon Singles Chart, Aitakute Aitakute reached No. 2, her highest position, and broke the sales record for her singles at the time of its release (it is currently second only to "Kimi tte" released five and a half months later in sales, but it still holds the record for the highest position and number of times one of her singles appeared on the Oricon Chart). The Chaku-Uta and Chaku-Uta Full downloads exceeded 1 million within 3 months of its release. This milestone was the second fastest in history, second only to GReeeeN's "Kiseki" (1 million in 1 month) and "Ai Uta" (1 million in 3 months). In addition, the song was ranked No. 1 on the annual Chaku-Uta Full paid music download chart for that year.

== Promotion ==
The song was used in commercials for fashion jewellery company GemCerey. Nishino also worked together with Gencerey to create a special Kana Nishino line on jewellery products, including necklaces, rings and cellphone straps.

"Love Is Blind" was used in commercials for Æon, featuring tarento Yukina Kinoshita.

== Track listing ==
No.	Title	Lyrics	Music	Arranger	Length
1.	"Aitakute Aitakute"	Kana Nishino, Giorgio Cancemi	Cancemi	Cancemi	4:43
2.	"Love Is Blind"	Nishino	Hiro	Hiro	3:57
3.	"Grab Bag"	Nishino, Sachiyo Matsuoka	DJ Mass, Exxxit, Nishino	Vivid Neon*, Exxxit	3:16
Total length:					11:56

== Charts ==
"Aitakute Aitakute"
A sample of the chorus of the song.

Chart	Peak position
Billboard Japan Hot 100	4
Billboard Adult Contemporary Airplay	12
Oricon Daily Singles chart	2
Oricon Weekly Singles chart	2
Oricon Monthly Singles chart	7
Oricon Yearly Singles chart	72
RIAJ Digital Track Chart weekly top 100	1
RIAJ Digital Track Chart yearly top 100	1

=== Reported sales ===
Chart	Amount
Oricon physical sales	97,000
RIAJ ringtone downloads	750,000+
RIAJ full-length cellphone downloads	1,000,000+
RIAJ streaming	100,000,000+
