= To Love (Kana Nishino album) =

- Regular edition cover

Studio album by Kana Nishino
- Released: June 23, 2010
- Recorded: 2009–2010
- Genres: J-pop; R&B
- Length: 57:20
- Label: SME Records

Kana Nishino chronology
Love One. (2009)	To Love (2010)	Thank You, Love (2011)

Alternative cover
- Limited edition cover

Singles from To Love
- 1. "Motto..." Released: October 21, 2009; 2. "Dear.../Maybe" Released: December 2, 2009; 3. "Best Friend" Released: February 24, 2010; 4. "Aitakute Aitakute" Released: May 19, 2010

To Love (stylized as to LOVE) is the second studio album by Japanese recording artist Kana Nishino. It was released on June 23, 2010, by SME Records. Beginning sometime in 2009, the album's production was handled by several music producers, such as Jeff Miyahara, Giorgio Cancemi, Daniel Sherman, Mats Lie Skåre, ViVi, Andreas Levander, among others. It also features a guest appearance from Japanese hip-hop and reggae musician Minmi. Nishino contributed towards the album as the executive songwriter. To Love is primarily a J-pop album with numerous elements of dance-pop, pop rock, R&B, electropop and adult contemporary.

Music critics gave To Love positive reviews, praising the album's overall sound, production quality and Nishino's vocals. A commercial success, To Love became her first number-one album in Japan, premiering at the top spot with first week sales of over 290,000 units. This made Nishino the first soloist born in the Heisei era to top the Oricon Albums Chart. It became the year's best-selling album by a female soloist. To Love is Nishino's most successful album to date, selling over 750,000 copies and receiving a triple platinum certification from Recording Industry Association of Japan (RIAJ). The album's critical and commercial success earned Nishino the Excellent Album Award at the 52nd Japan Record Awards.

The album spawned four top ten hits on the Oricon Singles Chart: "Motto...," "Dear.../Maybe," "Best Friend" and "Aitakute Aitakute." All of these singles went on to be certified "million" for full song downloads of over one million copies by the RIAJ, consequently establishing Nishino as a force to be reckoned with on music charts and digital platforms. "Aitakute Aitakute" in particular is one of the best-selling multi-format singles in Japan. Nishino promoted To Love by embarking on the Kanayan Tour 2010 〜Autumn〜 hall tour, which ran from early to mid September 2010.

== Background and production ==
On June 24, 2009, Nishino released her debut album, Love One.. Despite its initial singles not seeing much success, the songs promoted around the album's release ("Tookutemo" feat. Wise, "Kimi ni Aitaku Naru Kara" and "Kimi no Koe o" feat. Verbal (M-Flo)) were gradual hits in the digital market. Love One. fared well commercially, peaking at number four on the Oricon Albums Chart and was certified platinum for selling up to 250,000 copies. After Love One. was released, Nishino started work on its follow-up, To Love. For the album, Nishino's record label SME Records hired an array of Japanese and western musicians such as Jeff Miyahara, Giorgio Cancemi, Daniel Sherman, Mats Lie Skåre, ViVi, Andreas Levander, among others to work on it. For the album, Nishino contributed as the main and background vocalist, along with being the album's primary lyricist. Much like her first album, To Love is centered around the theme of love. As exactly one year had passed from her previous album, Nishino wanted to express the growth in her values and view on love.

In an interview with Yahoo! Japan, Nishino explained in full detail on how she wrote the album's lyrics:

I get an image from the song, and I make a short movie in my head. I write lyrics as if I were writing a script. The movie in my head is linked to images from my past, and sometimes it expands from a flashback. There are many times when it is difficult to put into words, so I work so hard and stoically that once I start writing, I never leave my room. But I do eat food (laughs).

== Writing and composition ==
"Summer Girl"
"Summer Girl" is a happy-go-lucky party song that features the reggae musician Minmi.

"Kono Mama De"
"Kono Mama De" is a tenderhearted love ballad that expresses special feelings for a loved one.

"＊Prologue＊〜What a nice〜" is the minute and a half opener for the album, which she sings in a whisper while praying to the stars for a prince to appear. "Best Friend" is a song that expresses love with a falsetto that floats over a bouncy, sparkling melody. "Summer Girl" is party tune filled with a sense of the summer season; the song is performed as a duet with Japanese reggae musician Minmi. "Hey Boy" is a surf rock tune. "Motto..." carries sparkling strings and scratchy keys in its production. "Love & Smile" is a message song that wishes to continue to deliver these two elements for happiness.

"Kono Mama de" is a midtempo love ballad that expresses special feelings for a loved one. "Maybe" is an upbeat track combining keyboards and electronica influences. "Wrong" is a rock-tinged number depicting the desire to sever ties with a man who is all talk. "Come On Yes Yes Oh Yeah!!" is a dance pop tune with a hook that is reminiscent of Daft Punk's "One More Time." "Dear..." is a pop ballad that utilizes the violin and keyboard. "Aitakute Aitakute" is a power ballad that sing about longing for someone, with the melody played by the delicate keyboard and violin. "You Are the One" is a melodious medium tempo love ballad. "*Epilogue*～to LOVE～" is the closer of the album; like the prologue, it is a romantic piece that prays to the stars for a wonderful surprise for meeting someone.

== Release and formats ==
To Love was released on June 23, 2010, her second studio album overall. The album contains 14 songs totaling over 57 minutes in length. The first limited-edition version of To Love included a bonus DVD with six music videos along with accompanying behind-the-scenes footage. Tomoya Nagatani shot the album artwork and photoshoot; the artwork for the regular edition depicts Nishino sitting on a settee in a garden, while the limited edition artwork is just a close up of Nishino's face.

== Promotion ==
=== Singles and other song ===
To Love spawned four singles. "Motto..." was released as the album's lead single on October 21, 2009. It served as the theme song for the Nippon Television dorama Detective M. "Motto..." debuted atop the RIAJ Digital Track Chart. The RIAJ certified the track triple platinum for ringtone downloads of over 750,000 units. By February 2014, "Motto..." was certified million for full-length downloads of over one million units. The double A-side single "Dear.../Maybe" was released on December 2, 2009. "Dear.." served as the official theme song for NTT DoCoMo's exam support project "Ganbare Jikkou ’09-'10.” "Maybe” served as the commercial song for Maybelline New York's ‘Volume Express Magnum’ featuring Nishino herself. "Dear..." was certified triple platinum by the RIAJ for ringtone downloads of over 750,000 units, while also being certified million for selling over one million full-length downloads.

"Best Friend" was released on February 24, 2010. Like the previous song, it also served as the second installment of NTT Docomo's “Ganbare Jikkou ’09-'10” campaign song. "Best Friend" was certified million in two different categories by the RIAJ for selling over one million ringtone downloads, along with selling one million full-length downloads. May 21, 2010, saw the release of the album's final single, "Aitakute Aitakute." The song became her biggest hit to date and was named the hottest selling digital song of the year 2010. "Aitakute Aitakute" is listed as one of the best-selling multi-format singles in Japan, with total sales exceeding 5.097 million units (5,000,000 downloads and 97,000 physical units). "Aitakute Aitakute" also served as Gemcerey's TV-CF song. The song "Maybe" has been downloaded on cellphones more than 100,000 times, along with a B-side to "Best Friend" "One Way Love" that is not present on the album.

=== Live performance ===
Nishino promoted To Love with a series of live performances and appearances throughout Japan. In July 2010, Nishino held a tour of “love spots” in Kobe, Osaka and Kyoto called Kana Nishino to LOVE Kansai to celebrate her album reaching number one on the weekly Oricon Albums Chart. In Kyoto, the final stop, she performed “Dear...” in front of 3,000 people. She held her first nationwide Zepp Tour titled Kanayan Tour 2010 〜Autumn〜 from September 3, 2010, to September 18, 2010. She also performed a one-off performance at Tokyo International Forum Hall A (Tokyo) on December 6, 2010, which was titled Kanayan X'mas. Furthermore, at the end of December, she made her first appearance at the 61st NHK Kōhaku Uta Gassen with the song "Best Friend."

== Reception ==
Professional ratings
Review scores
Source	Rating
AllMusic	3/5 stars

Upon its release, To Love received positive reviews from most music critics. Adam Greenberg of AllMusic awarded the album three stars out of five. He described Nishino's vocals throughout the record as "strengthening" and praised her for showcasing her newfound strength. He stated: "The album is strong, easily on par with other entries in the post-idol J-pop scene." Koji Izushima of bounce magazine stated that the album showed off her true potential and stated that there were many great songs, highlighting the numbers "Summer Girl," "Wrong" and "Come On Yes Yes Oh Yeah!!" as its standouts.

On December 30, 2010, To Love won the Excellence Album Award at the 52nd Japan Record Awards.

== Commercial performance ==
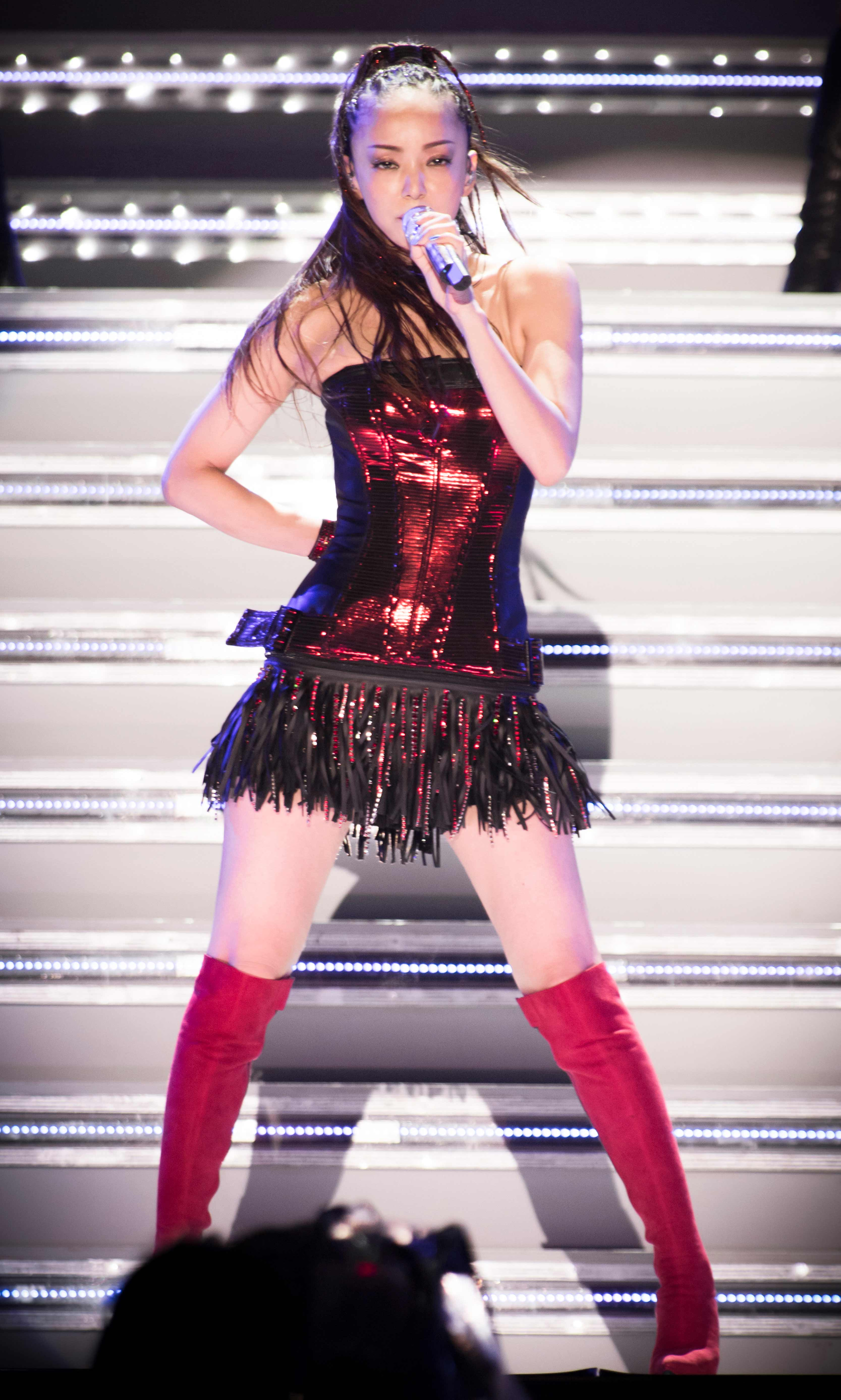
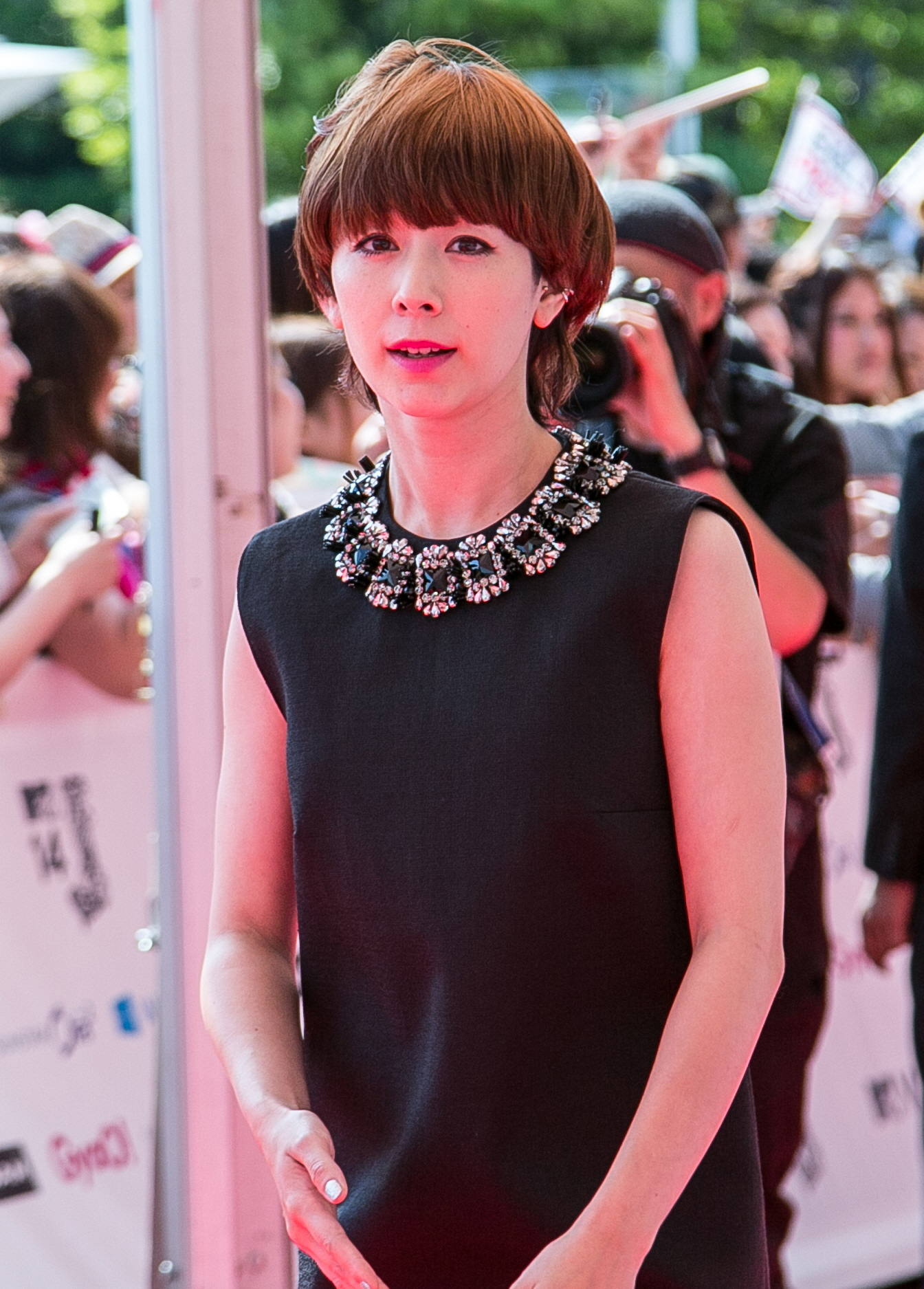
To Love overtook Past<Future by Namie Amuro (left) and 5 years by Kaela Kimura (right) as the year's best-selling album by a female soloist.

To Love debuted at number one on Oricon's daily albums chart, selling 71,000 units on its first day. It stayed at number one for the first week, selling 290,048 units. The album stayed at number one for a second consecutive week, shifting 112,724 units. The album spent the next two weeks at number three, shifting 67,697 units on its third week, as well as 36,814 units on its fourth. To Love stayed in the top five one last week, ranking at number four and selling 24,462 units. It slid to number eight the following week, selling 17,976 units. On its seventh week, the album plummeted to number ten on the chart, shifting 14,120 units. On its eighth week, it climbed up to number seven on the chart, selling 15,923 units. To Love stayed in the top ten one last week, ranking at number nine and selling 9,894 units.

The album continued to rank for an astonishing 104 weeks, staying in the top 300 for two years. To Love was a commercial success for Nishino; it sold 645,417 copies in 2010, making it the third best-selling album of the year, as well as the year's best-selling album by a female soloist, beating out two chart entries by Namie Amuro and Kaela Kimura. It received a triple platinum certification by the RIAJ for selling more than 750,000 copies nationwide. The album also performed well in rental sales, ranking eighth in Tsutaya's Heisei era album rental rankings.

Many album tracks were popular enough to chart digitally after the album's release. "Love & Smile," released a week before the album, was the most successful, peaking at number five. Others included "Summer Girl" feat. Minmi (number eight), "Kono Mama de" (number fourteen) and "You Are the One" (number sixty-four). The track "Kono Mama de" has been certified platinum for selling over 250,000 downloads. The song "Love & Smile" has been certified gold for over 100,000 downloads.

== Track listing ==
All lyrics are written by Kana Nishino except noted.

CD
No.	Title	Lyrics	Music	Arranger(s)	Length
1.	"＊Prologue＊〜What a nice〜"		ViVi	Sizk	1:33
2.	"Best Friend"		Giorgio Cancemi	Cancemi	5:19
3.	"Summer Girl feat. Minmi"	co-written with Minmi	Jeff Miyahara, Minmi, Kenji "Jino" Hino, Masa Kohama	Miyahara, Hino, Kohama	3:49
4.	"Hey Boy"		Andreas Levander, Miriam Nervo, Olivia Nervo, Jonas Nordelius	Vivid Neon*	3:17
5.	"Motto... (もっと…)"		Cancemi	Cancemi	5:29
6.	"love & smile"		Toiza71	Toiza71	5:04
7.	"Kono Mama de (このままで, Stay Like This)"		Saeki YouthK	Kotaro Egami	4:15
8.	"MAYBE"	co-written with Giorgio Cancemi	Cancemi	Cancemi	4:04
9.	"WRONG"		Bachlogic, Winston Sela, Daniel Sherman	Bachlogic	3:28
10.	"Come On Yes Yes Oh Yeah!!"	co-written with DJ Mass and Yuki Keity	DJ Mass, Exxit	Vivid Neon*, Exxit	5:05
11.	"Dear..."		Shinquo Ogura, Cancemi	Cancemi	5:28
12.	"Aitakute Aitakute (会いたくて 会いたくて)"	co-written with Giorgio Cancemi	Cancemi	Cancemi	4:42
13.	"You are the one"		Mats Lie Skare, Zetton	Zetton	4:34
14.	"＊Epilogue＊〜to LOVE〜"		ViVi	Sizk	1:13
Total length:					57:20

DVD
No.	Title	Length
1.	"Kimi no Koe wo (君の声を) feat.VERBAL(m-flo)" (Music video)
2.	"Making of Kimi no Koe wo feat.VERBAL(m-flo)"
3.	"Motto..." (Music video)
4.	"Making of Motto..."
5.	"Dear..." (Music video)
6.	"Making of Dear..."
7.	"Best Friend" (Music video)
8.	"Making of Best Friend"
9.	"Aitakute Aitakute" (Music video)
10.	"Making of Aitakute Aitakute"

== Personnel ==
- Bachlogic - arrangement/music/production/programming (#9)
- Giorgio Cancemi - arrangement/music/production/recording (#2, #5, #8, #11–12), lyrics (#8, #12)
- DJ Mass (Vivid Neon*) - cuts/lyrics/music (#10), instruments (#4)
- Kotaro Egami (Supa Love) - arrangement/production (#7)
- Exxxit - music (#10)
- Grumpy (Digz, inc) - mixing (#6)
- Takuya Harada - vocal direction (#9, #13)
- Yuki Hasegawa - child chorus member (#6)
- Kenji "Jino" Hino - arrangement/music (#3)
- Hiro (Digz, inc) - vocal direction (#6)
- Satoshi Hosoi - mixing (#3–4, #9–10, #13)
- Marin Iitsuka - child chorus member (#6)
- Yuma Iitsuka - child chorus member (#6)
- Gonta Kawamoto - mixing (#7)
- Yuki Keity (Exxxit) - lyrics (#10)
- Kgro (Digz, inc) - recording (#6)
- Masa Kohama - arrangement/music (#3)
- Andreas Levander - music (#4)
- Mats Lie Skare - music (#13)
- Yasuo Matsumoto - mastering/mixing (#5)
- Minmi - lyrics/music/vocals (#3)
- Jeff Miyahara - arrangement/music (#3)
- Toshihiko Miyoshi - mastering (#2, #8, #11), mixing (#2, #8, #11–12)
- Miriam Nervo - music (#4)
- Olivia Nervo - music (#4)
- Kana Nishino - lyrics (all tracks), vocals (all tracks)
- Jonas Nordelius - music (#4)
- Mitsuki Ogasawara - child chorus member (#6)
- Kazuma Ogawa - child chorus member (#6)
- Shinquo Ogura - music (#11)
- Saeki Youthk - music (#7)
- Kazuhito Saito - mixing (#7), recording (#1, #4, #6, #9–10, #13–14)
- Hidekazu Sakai - mastering (all tracks)
- Winston Sela - music (#9)
- Daniel Sherman - music (#9)
- Sizk (Star Guitar) - arrangement/mixing/production (#1, #14)
- Rock Sakurai (Exxxit) - instruments (#4)
- So-Hey! (Nerdhead) - violin (#11–12)
- Himari Suzuki - child chorus member (#6)
- Toiza71 (Digz, inc) - arrangement/music (#6)
- ViVi - music (#1, #14)
- Vivid Neon* - arrangement/production (#4, #10)
- Yamachi - guitar (#2)
- Yuichi Yamada (Nerdhead) - keyboard (#2, #5, #8, #11–12)
- Takashi Yamaguchi - guitar (#4, #6)
- Zetton - arrangement/music/programming (#13)

== Charts ==
=== Weekly charts ===
Chart (2010)	Peak position
Japanese Albums (Oricon)	1

=== Year-end charts ===
Chart (2010)	Position
Japanese Albums (Oricon)	3

== Certification and sales ==
Region	Certification	Certified units/sales
Japan (RIAJ)	3× Platinum	727,945
