= Thank You, Love =

Thank You, Love may refer to:

- Thank You, Love (Jose Mari Chan album)
- Thank You, Love (Kana Nishino album)
