= Naruto Shippuden the Movie: The Lost Tower =

2010 Japanese anime film directed by Masahiko Murata

- Japanese film poster
- Directed by: Masahiko Murata
- Written by: Junki Takegami
- Produced by: Fukashi Azuma; Naoji Hōnokidani
- Starring: Junko Takeuchi; Toshiyuki Morikawa; Saori Hayami; Ryūzaburō Ōtomo
- Cinematography: Atsuho Matsumoto
- Edited by: Seiji Morita; Yukie Oikawa
- Music by: Yasuharu Takanashi; Yaiba
- Production company: Studio Pierrot
- Distributed by: Toho
- Release date: July 31, 2010
- Running time: 85 minutes
- Country: Japan
- Language: Japanese
- Box office: ¥1.03 billion (US$8.5 million)

Naruto Shippuden the Movie: The Lost Tower (Japanese: 劇場版 NARUTO(ナルト) 疾風伝 ザ・ロストタワー, Hepburn: Gekijō-ban Naruto Shippūden Za Rosuto Tawā) is a 2010 Japanese animated action-adventure fantasy film based on Masashi Kishimoto's manga and anime series. It was released on July 31, 2010. Along with the film, a comical short feature named Naruto, the Genie, and the Three Wishes!! (劇場版NARUTO-ナルト-そよ風伝 ナルトと魔神と3つのお願いだってばよ！！, Gekijōban Naruto Soyokazeden: Naruto to mashin to mitsu no onegai dattebayo!!) was also shown. The theme song "if" is performed by Kana Nishino. The film was released in North America on September 17, 2013, by Viz Media. The movie is set after the episode 143 of the Naruto: Shippuden anime series.

== Plot ==
Assigned a mission to capture a missing-nin named Mukade, Naruto Uzumaki, Sakura Haruno, Yamato and Sai wield chakra-knives. At the one thousand-year-old desert city ruins of Loran, they confront Mukade attempting to dominate the Ninja World with the power of the Ryūmyaku (the Ley Line in English), an ancient chakra flowing deep underground. He breaks the seal created by Minato Namikaze to unleash the Ryūmyaku's power creating a light that engulfs Naruto and Yamato, while Sai and Sakura ride on an ink bird to get clear.

Naruto and Yamato are sent twenty years into the past. When Naruto awakens from this time slip, he meets the queen of Loran, Sāra. It is later revealed that Mukade traveled to the past six years before Naruto and changed his name to Anrokuzan, the minister of Loran who had killed Sāra's mother Sēramu. Naruto agrees to protect Sāra, after Anrokuzan declares about the kidnapped citizens and creates to summon the "Puppet Ninja Forces". Minato, Shibi Aburame, Chōza Akimichi, and Kakashi Hatake, on their own mission to stop Anrokuzan, appear to support the heroes.

While they rescue Sara's people and Naruto holds Minato's kunai, Sāra recalls her memory about Sēramu's lullaby. Anrokuzan uses the parts of the tower to become a giant defensive puppet, but Minato and Naruto use their regenerative chakra enough to create the legendary Super Rasengan. After Sāra disables the Ryūmyaku, Minato exposes Anrokuzan's weak spot which Naruto then destroys, but Anrokuzan throws himself into the Ryūmyaku to make it destroy them all. As Yamato and Kakashi rescue Naruto and Sāra, Minato uses the kunai to completely seal the Ryūmyaku. Just as the heroes vanish from the past, Minato erases all of their memories to keep history unchanged.

With Mukade/Anrokuzan gone, Sakura and Sai reunite with Naruto and Yamato in the present. As they are about to leave the ruins, they run into Queen Sāra's daughter, who kept the old chakra blade that belonged to Naruto. She informs that it was given to her mother by a "Hero in a Dream". Naruto recognizes his blade, reaches out to his back where he usually kept it, and finds it not there, leaving him dumbfounded. However, Sakura pinches his ear and accuses him for having a dream.

== Cast ==
Character	Japanese	English
Naruto Uzumaki	Junko Takeuchi	Maile Flanagan
Sakura Haruno	Chie Nakamura	Kate Higgins
Yamato	Rikiya Koyama	Troy Baker
Sai	Satoshi Hino	Ben Diskin
Minato Namikaze	Toshiyuki Morikawa	Tony Oliver
Young Kakashi	Mutsumi Tamura	Dave Wittenberg
Young Guy	Mayuki Makiguchi	Ben Diskin
Young Asuma	Fujiko Takimoto	Doug Erholtz
Hiruzen Sarutobi	Hidekatsu Shibata	Steve Kramer
Tsunade	Masako Katsuki	Debi Mae West
Shizune	Keiko Nemoto	Megan Hollingshead
Jiraiya	Hōchū Ōtsuka	David Lodge
Shibi Aburame	Kenji Hamada	Crispin Freeman
Chōza Akimichi	Nobuaki Fukuda	Michael Sorich
Sāra	Saori Hayami	Eden Riegel
Sēramu	Yumi Tōma	Mary Elizabeth McGlynn
Mukade / Anrokuzan	Ryūzaburō Ōtomo	JB Blanc
Masako	Yuko Kobayashi	Laura Bailey
Sarai	Fujiko Takimoto	Lucien Dodge

== Home media ==
The film was released on DVD on April 27, 2011.
