= Love One. =

Studio album by Kana Nishino
- Released: June 24, 2009
- Recorded: 2007-2008
- Genres: J-pop, R&B
- Length: 55:30
- Label: SME Records

Kana Nishino chronology
Love One. (2009)	To Love (2010)

Singles from Love One.
- 1. "I" Released: February 20, 2008; 2. "Glowly Days" Released: April 23, 2008; 3. "Style." Released: August 13, 2008; 4. "Make Up" Released: January 28, 2009; 5. "Tookutemo" Released: March 18, 2009; 6. "Kimi ni Aitaku Naru Kara" Released: June 3, 2009

Love One. (stylized as LOVE One.) is the debut studio album by Japanese singer and songwriter, Kana Nishino. It was released on June 24, 2009, by SME Records. It peaked at number 4 on the Oricon albums chart, selling 146,206 copies.

== Overview ==
Making her major label debut with the single, "I" on February 20, 2008, it was released for Digital Download in Japan and the United States. After a string of unsuccessful singles, she was selected to perform the second ending theme for the anime series, Soul Eater, with "Style" being released as the third single from the album. It became her best selling single at the time due to the popularity of the series, peaking at 57 on the Oricon charts.

== Critical reception ==
Johnny Loftus from AllMusic gave the album a mixed review, with criticism towards Nishino's vocals and overreliance on production, stating "the voice is thin, whispering to a fault. The songs get dominated by production as a result, with Nishino just hanging on to the focus by a thread more often than not."

== Track listing ==
All lyrics are written by Kana Nishino, except were noted.

No.	Title	Lyrics	Music	Arranger(s)	Length
1.	"Prologue ~Kirari~"		ViVi	SiZK	2:41
2.	"Tōkutemo feat. WISE (遠くても)"	co-written by WISE	Giorgio Cancemi	Giorgio Cancemi	5:45
3.	"Doll"		the agniss	the agniss	4:28
4.	"Girlfriend"		Olivia Nervo, Miriam Nervo, Bobby Huff	SiZK	3:50
5.	"Kimi no Koe wo feat. VERBAL (君の声を)"	co-written by VERBAL	Giorgio Cancemi	Giorgio Cancemi	5:30
6.	"Style."		Kazuhiko.M	Kazuhiko.M, SiZK	4:04
7.	"Life goes on..."		Ryuichiro Yamaki	Ryuichiro Yamaki	4:47
8.	"I"		Olivia Nervo, Miriam Nervo, Bobby Huff	SiZK	3:50
9.	"Candy"	co-written by Jeff Miyahara	Kana Nishino, Jeff Miyahara		3:13
10.	"Make Up"		Kazuhiko.M	Kazuhiko.M, SiZK	4:21
11.	"Glowly Days"		Marimo Wamoto	SiZK	3:43
12.	"Celtic"		Gajin	Makoto Sakuma, SiZK	4:13
13.	"Kimi ni Aitaku naru kara (君に会いたくなるから)"	co-written by Kanako Kato	Kana Nishino, Jeff Miyahara, Kenji "JINO" Hino	Jeff Miyahara, Kenji "Jino" Hino	4:06
14.	"Epilogue ~LOVE one.~"		ViVi	SiZK	1:18

== Charts ==
Weekly charts
Chart (2009)	Peak position
Japanese Albums (Oricon)	4

Year-end charts
Chart (2009)	Position
Japanese Albums (Oricon)	56

== Certifications ==
Region	Certification	Certified untis/sales
Japan (RIAJ)	Platinum	250,000

== Personnel ==
Adapted from liner notes booklet.

- SiZK from ★STAR GUiTAR: All Programming (Tracks #1, 4, 8, 11, 14)
- Giorgio Cancemi: All Programming (Tracks #2, 5)
- the agniss: All Programming (Track #3)
- Ryuichiro Yamaki: All Programming (Track #7)
- Makoto Sakuma: All Instrumental (Track #12)
- Kazuhiko Maeda: All Keyboards & All Programming (Tracks #6, 10)
- Yuichi Yamada: Keyboards (Track #2)
- Masato Minagawa: Keyboards (Track #11)
- Kenji “JINO” Hino: Keyboards (Track #13)
- YAMACHI: Guitar (Track #2)
- Takashi Yamaguchi: Guitar (Track #4)
- Hiroshi Furukawa: Guitar (Track #8)
- Takeo Sasada: Bass (Track #6)
- Takumi Matsuda: Bass (Track #8)
- Shinji Hasuike: Bass (Track #11)
- SO-HEY!: Violin (Track #2), Strings (Track #5)
- Yuko Aiso: Violin (Track #8)
