= Tribute: Maison de M-Flo =

Studio album by M-Flo
- Released: September 16, 2009
- Genre: Japanese hip hop, R&B
- Label: Rhythm Zone

M-Flo chronology
M-Flo Inside: Works Best III (2009)	Tribute: Maison de M-Flo (2009)	MF10: 10th Anniversary Best (2009)

Tribute: Maison de M-Flo is a tribute album to M-Flo released by Rhythm Zone on September 16, 2009. The songs are newly remixed or have a new arrangement and each song is covered by a different artist.

== Track listing ==
=== CD track listing ===
1. Miss You / May J. & Jonte
2. Come Again / Thelma Aoyama
3. Planet Shining / Coma-Chi
4. Yours only, feat. Wise / Kana Nishino
5. Been So Long / Jejung & Yuchun (from Tohoshinki)
6. Simple & Lovely / Misono
7. The Love Bug / Yu-A
8. Come Back To Me / Marie
9. L.O.T. (Love or Truth) / Beni
10. Let Go / Shota Shimizu

== Charts ==
Oricon Sales Chart (Japan)

Release	Chart	Peak position	Debut sales	Sales total
September 16, 2009	Oricon Daily Chart	6		
September 16, 2009	Oricon Weekly Chart	8	19,248	39,662*
