= Kimi ni Aitaku Naru Kara =

Single by Kana Nishino

from the album Love One.
- B-side: "Shitsuren mode feat. WISE"; Again
- Released: June 3, 2009
- Recorded: 2009
- Studio: Plick Pluck; Sunrise Studio
- Genre: Pop; R&B
- Length: 4:05
- Label: SME Records
- Songwriters: Kanako Kato, Kana Nishino, Jeff Miyahara, Kenji "JINO" Hino

Kana Nishino singles chronology
"Tookutemo" (2009)	"Kimi ni Aitaku Naru Kara" (2009)	"Motto..." (2009)

"Kimi ni Aitaku Naru Kara" (君に会いたくなるから, Because I've Grown to Miss You) is the sixth single released by Japanese pop and R&B singer-songwriter Kana Nishino. It was released on June 3, 2009, by her record label SME Records. The song was written by Nishino and Kanako Kato and composed by Nishino, Jeff Miyahara and Kenji "JINO" Hino; this single marked the first time that Nishino herself has been involved in composing a song. It was used as the commercial song for Recochoku.

"Kimi ni Aitaku Naru Kara" was well received by music critics, who complimented Nishino's vocal performance and the song's production. Commercially, the single was a success in Japan. It reached number nineteen on the weekly Oricon Singles Chart, becoming Nishino's first entry into the Oricon's top twenty. The Recording Industry Association of Japan (RIAJ) has certified the song double platinum for both ringtone and full song downloads sales of over 500,000.

== Background and composition ==
"Kimi ni Aitaku Naru Kara" was written collaboratively by Nishino and Kanako Kato. The song was recorded in early-2009 at Plick Pluck and Sunrise Studio. Nishino composed the song alongside Jeff Miyahara and Kenji "JINO" Hino, marking the first time that Nishino herself has been involved in composing a song. Musically, "Kimi ni Aitaku Naru Kara" is a highly melancholy electro-pop with a flamboyant keyboard arrangement. The first B-side "Shitsuren mode" was a collaboration with rapper Wise. The second B-side "Again" features writing credits from Australian duo Nervo, who wrote Nishino's debut single "I."

== Release and reception ==
This is her first single in about two and a half months since her last single, "Tookutemo," and the first single to precede her first album, Love One.. Men's Egg models (Ayumi Sato, Ryo Imai, Yukihide Sawamoto, Naoki Fujisawa) are featured in the music video, which was directed by Choku. It was used as the commercial song for Recochoku. On June 7, 2009, held a single release commemorative event at Lazona Kawasaki, which attracted 7,000 fans. With this song, she made her first appearance on Music Station, followed by a performance with Smap on SMAPxSMAP. On November 3, 2009, Nishino sung the song at the "Pocky & Pretz Day" anniversary in Shibuya in front of 45,000 spectators.

Music critics reacted positively to "Kimi ni Aitaku Naru Kara." CDJournal was positive on the song's appearance on Love One. and the greatest hits album Love Collection ~Pink~, with the magazine praising Kenji Hino's production as "gorgeous." Tower Records stated: "The lyric 'Don't be kind to me, I'll miss you...' and the voice that reaches straight to your heart will heal your pain of true heartbreak."

== Commercial performance ==
The song debuted at number nineteen on the Oricon Singles Chart, selling 5,222 units in its first week. This became Nishino's first single to crack the top twenty on Oricon. It continued to rank for a total of eight weeks, selling 12,412 physical copies in total. Digitally, "Kimi ni Aitaku Naru Kara" was a success in Japan, becoming her biggest-selling single to that point. The digital version of the single debuted at number 5 on the RIAJ Digital Track Chart. The single also reached number seven on the Billboard Japan Hot 100, becoming her first song to peak in the top ten of that chart. "Kimi ni Aitaku Naru Kara" was eventually certified double platinum by the Recording Industry Association of Japan (RIAJ) for both ringtone and full-length downloads of over 500,000 copies.

== Track listing ==
No.	Title	Lyrics	Music	Arranger(s)	Length
1.	"Kimi ni Aitaku Naru Kara"	Kana Nishino, Kanako Kato	Kana Nishino, Jeff Miyahara, Kenji "JINO" Hino	Jeff Miyahara, Kenji "JINO" Hino	4:05
2.	"Shitsuren Mode feat. WISE"	Kana Nishino, WISE	Skate Sonic EXP*	Skate Sonic EXP*	5:28
3.	"Again"	Kana Nishino	Oliva Nervo, Mariam Nervo, Mathias Wollo, Henrik Korpi	SiZK	3:37

== Charts ==
Chart (2009)	Peak position
Japan Weekly Chart (Oricon)	19
Japan Hot 100 (Billboard)	7
RIAJ Digital Track Chart)	5
Top Singles Sales (Billboard Japan)	19

== Certification ==
Region	Certification	Certified units/sales
Japan (RIAJ) Ringtone	2× Platinum	500,000^{*}
Japan (RIAJ) Digital single	2× Platinum	500,000^{*}
^{*} Sales figures based on certification alone.
