= If (Kana Nishino song) =

Single by Kana Nishino

from the album Thank You, Love
- B-side: "I'll Be There"; "Beautiful"
- Released: August 4, 2010
- Genre: J-pop, R&B
- Length: 4:42
- Label: SME Records
- Songwriters: Kana Nishino, Giorgio Cancemi
- Producer: Giorgio Cancemi

Kana Nishino singles chronology
"Aitakute Aitakute" (2010)	"If" (2010)	"Kimi tte" (2010)

"If" (stylised as "if") is a song by Japanese pop singer Kana Nishino. It was released as her 11th single on August 4, 2010. The song was given the working name "I Swear" before its release. In initial promotional material about the single, it was described as a mellow medium tempo ballad, written about "a meeting with fate."

== Promotion ==
"If" is her first single in about 3 months since her last one "Aitakute Aitakute".

The title song "If" is the theme song for the movie Naruto Shippuden the Movie: The Lost Tower. This is the second time that Nishino has sung a theme song for an anime film since her song "MAKE UP" (Bootleg, 2009). "If" also was used in a television commercial campaign for Recochoku.

The first pressing limited edition includes a special jacket for the first pressing, a special Naruto Shippuden the Movie: The Lost Tower jacket, and a flyer announcing the pre-opening of Nishino's official fan club, "Nishino Family".

== Track listing ==
No.	Title	Lyrics	Music	Arranger(s)	Length
1.	"If"	Kana Nishino, Giorgio Cancemi	Cancemi	Cancemi	4:42
2.	"I'll Be There"	Nishino	Nasri Atweh, Lolene Everett, J.R. Rotem	Rotem	3:46
3.	"Beautiful"	Nishino	Hiro	Hiro	4:33
Total length:					13:01

== Charts ==
Chart (2010)	Peak position
Billboard Japan Adult Contemporary Airplay	13
Billboard Japan Hot 100	6
Oricon daily singles	7
Oricon weekly singles	5
Oricon monthly singles	7
Oricon yearly singles	79
RIAJ Digital Track Chart weekly top 100	1
RIAJ Digital Track Chart yearly top 100	4

== Certifications and sales ==
Chart	Amount
Oricon physical sales	91,000
RIAJ physical shipping certification	Gold (100,000+)
RIAJ ringtone downloads	Triple platinum (750,000+)
RIAJ full-length cellphone downloads	Triple platinum (750,000+)
RIAJ streaming	Platinum (100,000,000+)
