= Motto... =

"Motto…"

Single by Kana Nishino

from the album To Love
- B-side: "Missing You"; "Dear My Friends"
- Released: October 21, 2009
- Recorded: 2009
- Genre: Pop; R&B
- Label: SME Records
- Songwriters: Kana Nishino; Giorgio Cancemi

Kana Nishino singles chronology
"Kimi ni Aitaku Naru Kara" (2009)	"Motto…" (2009)	"Dear…/Maybe" (2009)

"Motto…" (もっと・・・, "More…") is the seventh single released by Japanese pop and R&B singer-songwriter Kana Nishino. It was released on October 21, 2009, by her record label SME Records as the lead single to her sophomore album To Love. The title track was used as a commercial song for Recochoku and the Nippon TV dorama Detective M's theme song. It was written by Nishino, while production was handled by Giorgio Cancemi. Musically, the song is an R&B pop ballad that lyrically speaks on the bittersweet feelings of love that come with youth.

Upon its release, the track garnered warm reviews from music critics, who praised Nishino's songwriting, along with the song's composition. "Motto..." achieved success in Japan, peaking at number one on the RIAJ Digital Track Chart and number six on the Oricon Singles Chart. The Recording Industry Association of Japan (RIAJ) has certified the track triple platinum for ringtone downloads of over 750,000, as well as million for full song downloads of over one million. An accompanying music video for "Motto..." was shot by Nobu Sueyoshi in Zushi Marina. For additional promotion, the song was featured on her first greatest hits album Love Collection ~pink~ (2013), and was sung on her Just LOVE Tour (2017).

== Background and composition ==
On September 22, 2009, Sony Music Japan confirmed the release of Nishino's single "Motto.." for September 23, 2009, as a ringtone. On September 23, 2009, it was announced that the physical copy would be made available a month later on October 21, 2009. "Motto..." was written by Nishino, while production and arrangement was handled by Giorgio Cancemi. The first B-side "Missing You" was written by Nishino and Sakura Leon and composed by Kotaro Egami under the pen name Supa Love. "Dear My Friends" serves as the single's second B-side and was written by Nishino, composed by Susumu Kawai and arranged by Ken Arai under the alias eighteen degrees.

Musically, "Motto..." is a pop ballad whose instrumentation consists of keyboards and record scratches; the lyrics capture the bittersweet feelings of love that come with youth. "Missing You" is a pop ballad about a lost love that describes heartache. "Dear My Friends" is a colorful, upbeat house style song with lyrics which tells a friend not to look back on the past and to work hard towards their dreams.

== Reception ==
Upon its release, "Motto..." received favorable reviews from music critics. Writing for Japanese music magazine CD Journal, a staff editor was positive in his/her report, and complimented the track's lyrical content by saying it captured the true essence of the "charismatic girl of the mobile phone generation." Commercially, the single experienced success in Japan. It debuted at number six on the Oricon Singles Chart, selling 17,956 copies in its first week of availability, becoming her first song to enter the top ten. "Motto..." slipped to number nine the following week, shifting another 10,460 units in that region. In its third week, the single dropped to number seventeen and sold 7,029 units, eventually lasting a total of 31 weeks within the top 200. The song recorded 200,000 downloads in one week since its release as a ringtone on September 23rd, debuting at the number one spot on the RIAJ Digital Track Chart. Additionally, it peaked at number three on the Japan Hot 100, making it her first song to enter the chart's top five. The Recording Industry Association of Japan (RIAJ) certified the track triple platinum for selling ringtone downloads of over 750,000 units. By February 2014, "Motto..." was certified million for selling full-length downloads of over one million units.

== Music videos and promotion ==
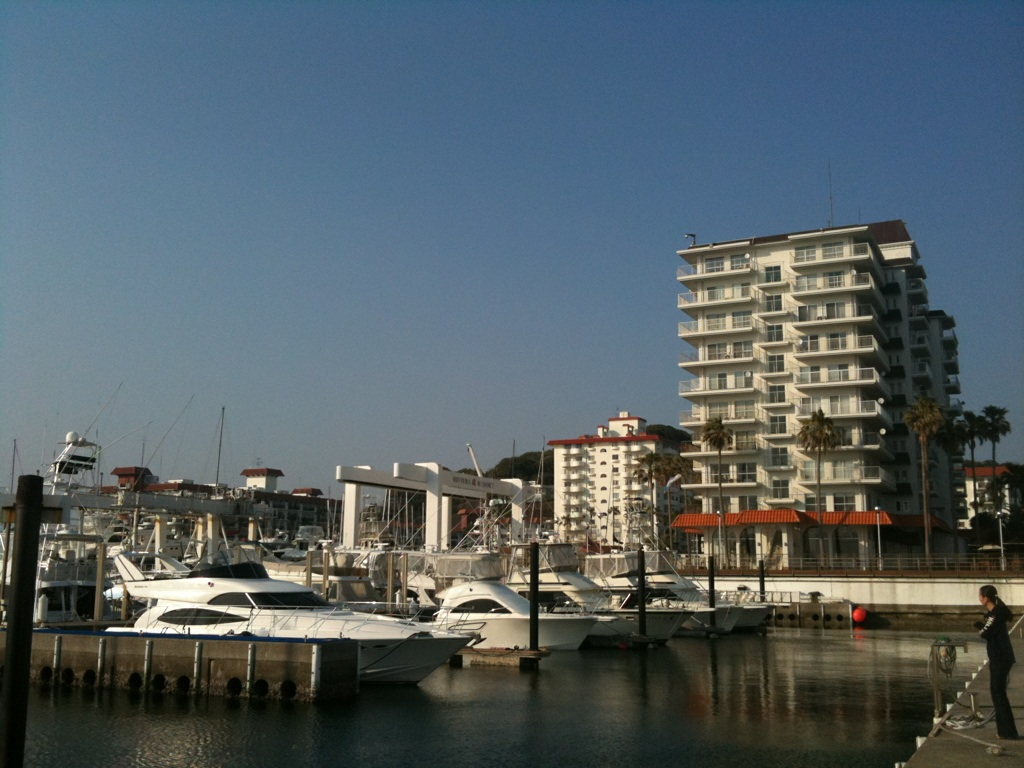
Zushi Marina where the music video for "Motto..." was shot.

The accompanying music video for "Motto..." was directed by Nobu Sueyoshi. "Motto..." was shot in Zushi Marina in Zushi City, Kanagawa Prefecture; Sayuri Koga and Rui Kotobuki appear in the video. The video depicts five scenes in total. The first scene depicts Nishino singing in front of a background of pink roses. The second shows Nishino singing on a settee in a room filled with wax candles. The third shows Nishino walking down the street. The fourth depicts Nishino at an outdoor party with her friends, while the fifth shows Nishino singing on a bench during the evening.

In order to promote the single, it was used as the theme song of the Nippon TV dorama Detective M starring Exile Makidai, as well as being used as the commercial song for Recochoku. The song was also included in the tracklist for Nishino's first greatest hits album Love Collection ~pink~ (2013). "Motto..." was most recently performed on her Just LOVE Tour, which promoted Just Love from summer to fall 2016.

== Track listing ==
No.	Title	Lyrics	Music	Arranger(s)	Length
1.	"Motto…" (もっと… "More…")	Kana Nishino	Giorgio Cancemi	G. Cancemi	5:30
2.	"Missing You"	K. Nishino, Sakura Leon	Kotaro Egami (SUPA LOVE)	K. Egami	5:37
3.	"Dear My Friends"	K. Nishino	Susumu Kawai	eighteen degrees.	4:33

== Charts ==
=== Daily and weekly charts ===
Chart (2009)	Peak position
Japan Singles Chart (Oricon)	6
Billboard Japan Hot 100	3
RIAJ Digital Track Chart	1
Billboard Japan Top Singles Sales	4

== Certifications ==
Region	Certification	Certified units/sales
Japan (RIAJ) Ringtone	3× Platinum	750,000^{*}
Japan (RIAJ) Digital single	Million	1,000,000^{*}
^{*} Sales figures based on certification alone.
