= Just Love (Kana Nishino album) =

Studio album by Kana Nishino
- Released: July 13, 2016
- Recorded: 2016
- Genre: J-pop
- Length: 59:24
- Language: Japanese
- Label: SME Records
- Producer: Kana Nishino

Kana Nishino chronology
With Love (2014)	Just Love (2016)

Just Love (styled Just LOVE) is the sixth studio album by Japanese singer and songwriter Kana Nishino. It was released on July 13, 2016. It was number-one on the Oricon weekly Albums Chart on its release, with 126,234 copies sold. It was the second best-selling album in Japan in July 2016, with 201,980 copies sold. It was also number-one on the Billboard Japan Hot Albums chart and also on the Billboard Japan Top Album Sales chart.

== Track listing ==
No.	Title	Length
1.	"Prologue: Let’s go"	2:19
2.	"Have a Nice Day"	4:27
3.	"You & Me"	3:59
4.	"Torisetsu (トリセツ)"	4:17
5.	"Yeah"	3:53
6.	"Wish Upon a Star"	2:33
7.	"Kimi ga Suki (君が好き)"	4:00
8.	"Moshimo Unmei no Hito ga Iru no Nara (もしも運命の人がいるのなら)"	5:22
9.	"Thank You Very Much"	4:44
10.	"Holiday"	4:08
11.	"I Wanna See You Dance"	4:02
12.	"Set Me Fee"	4:39
13.	"Life Is Good"	4:19
14.	"Anata no Sukina Tokoro (あなたの好きなところ)"	4:41
15.	"Epilogue: Just Love"	2:11
Total length:		59:24

== Charts ==
=== Weekly charts ===
Chart (2016)	Peak position
Japan (Oricon)	1
Japan (Billboard Japan)	1
Japan (Billboard Japan Top Sales)	1

=== Monthly charts ===
Chart (2016)	Peak position
Japan (Oricon)	2

=== Year-end charts ===
Chart (2016)	Position
Japan (Billboard Japan)	7
Japan (Oricon)	13

== Certification and sales ==
Region	Certification	Certified units/sales
Japan (RIAJ)	Platinum	305,538 (physical sales)
Japan (RIAJ)		5,576+ (digital sale)
