= Tookutemo =

Single by Kana Nishino featuring Wise

from the album Love One.
- B-side: "Girls Just Want to Have Fun Saturday☆Night feat. GIORGIO 13"
- Released: March 18, 2009
- Genre: Pop; R&B
- Label: SME Records
- Songwriters: Kana Nishino; Wise
- Composer: Giorgio Cancemi

Kana Nishino featuring Wise singles chronology
"Make Up" (2009)	"Tookutemo" (2009)	"Kimi ni Aitaku Naru Kara" (2009)

"Tookutemo" (遠くても; lit. "Being Distant") is fifth single by Japanese recording artist Kana Nishino, taken from her debut album, Love One. (2009). It contains a guest verse from Japanese rapper Wise and was released by SME Records on March 18, 2009. "Tookutemo" was composed by Giorgio Cancemi and was collaboratively written by Nishino and Wise. Musically, the song is a pop ballad influenced by R&B music and is based it off of both Nishino's and Wise's own experiences on the long-distance relationship topic. The song was released on Nishino's twentieth birthday.

"Tookutemo" received positive reviews from most music critics, some of whom considered it to be a highlight from her discography. Commercially, the song is widely considered to be her breakthrough. It became her first single to crack the top 50 of the Oricon Singles Chart by peaking at number 40. The song also peaked within the top 20 of the Japan Hot 100 and received a double platinum certification from the Recording Industry Association of Japan (RIAJ) for selling over 500,000 legal downloads in the country; becoming her first work to receive a certification. To promote the single, Nishino included it on several of her concert tours.

== Background and composition ==
"Tookutemo feat. WISE"
"Tookutemo" is a pop and R&B ballad with lyrics revolving around a long-distance relationship.

With "Tookutemo" being composed by Giorgio Cancemi, the song was written by Nishino and Wise. The second B-side track is a cover of Cyndi Lauper's signature song. Nishino sampled and covered this song because she was the opening act for Lauper's Japan Tour in September 2008. Female models Tomoko Tamogami, Rumi Itabashi, Kazue Nakai, Mirei Ueda, and Ayano Iwamura participated in the chorus. "Saturday☆Night" was written by both Nishino and Cancemi.

Musically, "Tookutemo" is an R&B-pop ballad that speaks about long-distance relationships. The song was created based on Nishino's own experience of a long-distance relationship in the past. The lyrics describe the view from the Sky-Boat Ferris wheel, the symbol of Sunshine Sakae, and the cityscape seen from the Ferris wheel. Saturday☆Night is an upbeat dance pop song that features a guest appearance from Cancemi credited under GIORGIO 13.

== Music video ==
The music video for "Tookutemo" was directed by Choku. Kumiko Funayama, a model for Popteen at the time, and Ayumu Sato, a model for Men's Egg, appeared in the music video for the song. The two were in a relationship at the time, and Sato even appeared in a special feature in Popteen, but they revealed that they broke up three months after the song's release.

== Release and reception ==
"Tokuutemo" was taken as the lead single from Nishino's debut record, Love One. (2009). It premiered in Japan on March 18, 2009 via SME Records in two formats; a CD single and digital download. "Tookutemo" was used as an ending theme of the Chūkyō TV late-night program SAKAE TA☆RO for the month of March 2009. Upon its release, the single received positive reviews from music critics. A member of CD Journal praised the track's production and Nishino's songwriting, saying that she turns even ordinary words into treasures. Furthermore, Alexey Eremenko of AllMusic selected it amongst her best singles.

Commercially, "Tookutemo" became her breakthrough in Japan. It became her first single to crack the top 40 on the Oricon Singles Chart by peaking at number 40, while also peaking at number 36 on Billboard Japan's Top Singles Sales chart. "Tookutemo" found more success on the Japan Hot 100 by peaking at number 17. The track was certified platinum by the RIAJ for selling over 500,000 legal downloads, her first song to receive a certification.

== Live performances and other appearances ==
"Tookutemo" was included in her first arena tour Kanayan Tour 2012 ~Arena~, her Love Collection Tour ~pink & mint~ tour, as well as Kana Nishino Dome Tour 2017 "Many Thanks". Besides its appearance on Love One., the song was also included in the tracklist for her greatest hits albums Love Collection 〜mint〜 and ALL TIME BEST ~Love Collection 15th Anniversary~.

== Track listing ==
Brave track listing
No.	Title	Lyrics	Music	Length
1.	"Tookutemo feat. Wise" (遠くても; Being Distant)	Kana Nishino; Wise	Giorgio Cancemi	5:45
2.	"Girls Just Want to Have Fun"	Kana Nishino; VIVID Neon; Robert Hazard	VIVID Neon; Robert Hazard	4:51
3.	"Saturday☆Night feat. GIORGIO 13"	Kana Nishino; GIORGIO 13	Giorgio Cancemi	4:44
Total length:				15:18

== Charts ==
Chart (2009)	Peak position
Japan Weekly Chart (Oricon)	40
Japan Hot 100 (Billboard)	17
Top Singles Sales (Billboard Japan)	36

== Certifications ==
Certifications for "Tookutemo"
Region	Certification	Certified units/sales
Japan (RIAJ)	2× Platinum	500,000^{*}
Streaming
Japan (RIAJ)	Gold	50,000,000^{†}
^{*} Sales figures based on certification alone.^{†} Streaming-only figures based on certification alone.
