= Thank You, Love (Kana Nishino album) =

Studio album by Kana Nishino
- Released: June 22, 2011
- Recorded: 2010–2011
- Genre: J-pop
- Length: 57:49
- Label: SME

Kana Nishino chronology
to LOVE (2010)	Thank You, Love (2011)	Love Place (2012)

Singles from Thank You, Love
- 1. "If" Released: August 4, 2010; 2. "Kimi tte" Released: November 3, 2010; 3. "Distance" Released: February 9, 2011; 4. "Esperanza" Released: May 18, 2011

Thank You, Love (styled Thank you, Love) is the third studio album by Japanese singer and songwriter Kana Nishino. It was released on June 22, 2011, by SME Records. Nishino acted as the album's primary lyricist, as she had on all of her preceding albums. Thank You, Love was created with the concept of a "warm album" and reflects Nishino's desire to create a work that includes positive elements. Thank You, Love marked new lyrical directions for Nishino: while Love One. and To Love were solely centered on songs about romance, this work is unique in that it expresses things other than that.

Music critics reviewed Thank You, Love positively, commending Nishino's emotional delivery throughout. The album was successful in Japan, becoming her second number one album on the Oricon Albums Chart and selling almost 350,000 copies in Japan. It was also certified double platinum by the Recording Industry Association of Japan (RIAJ).

Thank You, Love was promoted by four singles; "If," "Kimi tte," "Distance" and "Esperanza." every one of them performed well digitally, with the first two selling over a million full-length downloads each. All four tracks except "Alright" made it into the top ten on both the Oricon and Billboard single charts, and all topped the RIAJ paid music distribution chart, which is compiled by the RIAJ based on the number of downloads of full chaku-uta songs. Nishino helped promote the album on the tour Kanayan Tour 2011 ~ Summer~.

== Background ==
It was released just one year after the second album to LOVE. It contains 14 songs, including 5 singles released since her previous album. Like to LOVE, the album starts with a "Prologue" and ends with an "Epilogue". The album was produced around April 2011 when Nishino graduated from university and took a break. When Nishino looked back at her life, she felt gratitude for the people around her and the "connection" with the fans who could meet her face in music works, blogs, and live performances. "It was because of these people that I strongly felt that I existed, so the title was "Thank you, Love" with gratitude."

== Critical reception ==
Professional ratings
Review scores
Source	Rating
Hot Express	(positive)
excitement music	(positive)

Thank you, Love received positive reviews from music critics. Haruna Takegawa of Hot Express stated, "Up until now, Nishino has expressed his emotions honestly and has garnered a lot of sympathy, but this work proves that she is now one step further." Takegawa also singled out the album's eleventh track "Alright" as an album highlight. Kana Yoshida of excitement music commented, "It's packed full of the wonders of loving people, the sadness, the sadness, and the importance of interacting with people."

== Sales ==
Thank you, Love debuted at number 1 on the Oricon Daily Ranking on June 21, 2011, selling 50,000 copies on the first day of availability. On the Oricon Weekly Albums Chart dated July 4, 2011, the record debuted at number 1 with first week sales of over 178,000 copies. The album also debuted at number 1 on the Billboard JAPAN Top Albums on the same day. It is reported that Thank you, Love sold 345,878 copies in Japan.

== Track listing ==
All lyrics are written by Kana Nishino except noted.

CD
No.	Title	Lyrics	Music	Arranger(s)	Length
1.	"*Prologue* 〜Sunrise〜"		DJ Mass, Kyoko Osako, Hiroshi Yoshida	VIVID Neon*, Kyoko Osako	1:46
2.	"Esperanza ([es;] Hope)"		DJ Mass, Toshihiro Takita, Hiroshi Yoshida	VIVID Neon*, Toshihiro Takita	5:23
3.	"Clap Clap!!"	co-written with DJ Bass	DJ Mass, Kyoko Osako, Hiroshi Yoshida	VIVID Neon*, Hiroshi Yoshida	3:32
4.	"Together"		Shinquo Ogura	VIVID Neon*, Kyoko Osako, Tomoyuki Ogawa (arrangement du chœur)	5:14
5.	"Distance"		Mats Lie Skare, Fast Lane		3:46
6.	"I'll be there"		Jonathan Rotem, Lolene Everett, Nasri Atweh	J.R.Rotem	3:43
7.	"Flower"	co-written with Saeki YouthK	Saeki youthK	Kotaro Egami	5:52
8.	"Every Boy Every Girl"	co-written with DJ Mass, and hiro:n	DJ Mass, Toshihiro Takita, hiro:n	VIVID Neon*	4:16
9.	"Where are you?"		Sky Beatz, Fast Lane, Lisa Desmond		3:17
10.	"If"	co-written with Giorgio Cancemi	Giorgio Cancemi	Giorgio Cancemi, Toko (arrangement du chœur)	4:40
11.	"Alright"		Yuichi Hayashida	Yuichi Hayashida	5:01
12.	"Kimi tte" (君って; You)		Saeki youthK	Kotaro Egami	5:27
13.	"Wishing"		Yuichi Hayashida, Hiroshi Yoshida	Yuichi Hayashida	4:40
14.	"*Epilogue*〜Thank you, Love〜"		DJ Mass, Kyoko Osako, Hiroshi Yoshida	VIVID Neon*, Kyoko Osako	1:12
Total length:					57:49

== Charts ==
=== Weekly charts ===
Chart (2011)	Peak position
Japanese Albums (Oricon)	1
Japanese Top Albums (Billboard Japan)	1

=== Year-end charts ===
Chart (2011)	Peak position
Japanese Albums (Oricon)	15

== Certification and sales ==
Region	Certification	Certified units/sales
Japan (RIAJ)	2× Platinum	345,878
