= Best Friend (Kana Nishino song) =

Single by Kana Nishino

from the album To Love
- B-side: "One Way Love"; "Kon'ya wa Party Up"
- Released: February 24, 2010
- Genre: J-pop
- Label: SME Records
- Songwriters: Kana Nishino, Giorgio Cancemi

Kana Nishino singles chronology
"Dear…/Maybe" (2009)	"Best Friend" (2010)	"Aitakute Aitakute" (2010)

"Best Friend" is a song by Japanese singer-songwriter Kana Nishino. It was released as a single on February 24, 2010 by her record label SME Records.

The song has been certified as being downloaded as a ringtone one million times, and as a full-length download to cellphones 750,000 times.

== Track listing ==
No.	Title	Lyrics	Music	Arranger(s)	Length
1.	"Best Friend"	Kana Nishino	Giorgio Cancemi	Giorgio Cancemi	5:18
2.	"One Way Love"	Kana Nishino	Hiro	Hiro
3.	"Kon'ya wa Party Up" (今夜は Party Up "Party Up Tonight")	DJ Mass, Kana Nishino	DJ Mass, The Intelligents, HIRO;N	VIVID Neon*, The Intelligents

== Charts ==
Weekly chart performance for "Best Friend"
Release	Oricon Singles Chart	Peak position	Debut sales (copies)	Total sales (copies)
February 29, 2010	Daily chart	3		
February 29, 2010	Weekly chart	3	23,506	
February 29, 2010	Monthly chart	8		
February 29, 2010	Yearly chart	100	70,186	

Annual chart rankings for "Best Friend"
Chart (2010)	Rank
Japan Adult Contemporary (Billboard)	86
