= RIAJ Digital Track Chart =

Japanese record chart

The RIAJ Digital Track chart (RIAJ有料音楽配信チャート, RIAJ Yūryō Ongaku Haishin Chāto) was a record chart that ranks the best selling digital singles in Japan, with data provided by the Recording Industry Association of Japan from April 2009. The chart measures cellphone downloads (着うたフル Chaku-Uta Full) (not downloads from PCs, or ringtones (着うた Chaku-Uta)). On July 27, 2012, the service that tracked the charts was shut down.

== History ==
The RIAJ originally started certifying digital downloads in August 2006. At the same time, they began posting a monthly chart called the Reco-kyō Chart (レコ協チャート) (officially the Yūryō Ongaku Haishin Chart (有料音楽配信チャート)). This now defunct chart ranked the highest Chaku-uta (ringtone) downloads for the month. The chart was disbanded in March 2009 (the final month's data being February 2009), and was replaced by the identically named weekly Chaku-Uta Full chart.

== Methodology ==
The chart week runs from Wednesday to Tuesday and updated on every Friday at 11 a.m (JST). The first number-one song on this chart was "It's All Love!" by Kumi Koda and Misono.

At first, the data was sourced from five providers: Dwango, Mora, Mu-Mo, music.jp and Recochoku. On February 19, 2010, RIAJ announced that the data became the more expanded data sourced from 14 providers (new nine providers included the Oricon Me).

== Records ==
Only three non-domestic artists have ever broken the top 10 charts: Michael Jackson's "Thriller" at #7 in June 2009 (directly after his death) and the Backstreet Boys' "Straight Through My Heart" at #4 in September 2009 and Lady Gaga feat. Beyoncé's "Telephone" at #5 in April 2010.

== Songs with the most weeks at number one ==
4 weeks

- Greeeen – "Haruka"
- Mr. Children – "Inori ~Namida no Kidou"
- Che'Nelle – "Believe"

3 weeks

- AKB48 – "Flying Get"
- Exile – "Motto Tsuyoku"
- Hilcrhyme – "Daijōbu"
- Hilcrhyme – "Shunkashūtō"
- Infinity 16 welcomez Waka-danna from Shōnan no Kaze & Jay'ed – "Tsutaetai Koto ga Konna Aru noni"
- Juju – "Kono Yoru o Tomete yo"
- Juju with Jay'ed – "Ashita ga Kuru Nara"
- Kara – "Go Go Summer!"
- Kaoru to Tomoki, Tamani Mook – "Maru Maru Mori Mori!"
- Kana Nishino – "Best Friend"
- Kana Nishino – "If"
- Kana Nishino – "Kimi tte"
- Kana Nishino – "Watashitachi"

2 weeks

- AKB48 – "Heavy Rotation"
- AKB48 – "Kaze wa Fuiteiru"
- AKB48 – "Give Me Five!"
- Namie Amuro – "Love Story"
- Exile – "Futatsu no Kuchibiru"
- Exile – "I Wish for You"
- Exile – "Yasashii Hikari"
- Masaharu Fukuyama – "Hatsukoi"
- Ayumi Hamasaki – "Sunrise (Love Is All)"
- Hilcrhyme – "Loose Leaf"
- Jamosa feat. Jay'ed & Wakadanna – "Nanika Hitotsu"
- Kaela Kimura – "Butterfly"
- Koda Kumi – "Ai o Tomenaide"
- Mr. Children – "Kazoe Uta"
- Mika Nakashima – "Always"
- Kana Nishino – "Aitakute Aitakute"
- Kana Nishino – "Motto..."
- Kana Nishino – "Distance"
- Kana Nishino – "Sakura, I Love You?"
- Fuyumi Sakamoto – "Mata Kimi ni Koi Shiteru"
- Shota Shimizu x Miliyah Kato – "Forever Love"
- Kana Uemura – "Toilet no Kamisama"

== See also ==
- List of number one Reco-kyō Chart singles 2006–2009
