= Kana Nishino =

Japanese pop singer (born 1989)

- 西野カナ
- Born: March 18, 1989 (age 37); Matsusaka, Mie, Japan
- Other name: Kanayan (カナやん)
- Occupation: Singer
- Spouse: Unknown (m. 2019)
- Children: 1
- Musical career
- Genres: J-pop; R&B
- Instrument: Vocals
- Years active: 2008–2019; 2024–present
- Label: SME
- Website: www.nishinokana.com

Kana Nishino (西野カナ, Nishino Kana; born March 18, 1989) is a Japanese singer, signed with Sony Music Japan's SME Records. She debuted on February 20, 2008, with the single "I".

Considered one of Japan's most popular songstresses of the late 2000s and 2010s, she gained early popularity with the R&B singles "Tookutemo" (with rapper Wise) and "Kimi ni Aitaku Naru Kara". Her first studio album, Love One. (2009), debuted at number four on charts and went on to become certified platinum. She achieved further success with her second album, To Love (2010), her first number-one album, which was preceded by the singles "Motto...", "Dear...", "Best Friend" and "Aitakute Aitakute" which were all certified "million" for full song downloads of over 1 million by the Recording Industry Association of Japan (RIAJ), establishing Nishino as a dominant force on music charts and digital platforms. The Triple Platinum certified album became the third best-selling album of 2010 and the single "Aitakute Aitakute" was the hottest selling digital song of the year. While enjoying mammoth mainstream success with her following records Thank You, Love (2011), Love Place (2012) and With Love (2014), Nishino's music also evolved from R&B to pop.

In the mid-2010s, she successfully ventured into country pop with the singles "Darling" (2014) and "Torisetsu" (2015). The latter, the theme song of the live action film Heroine Shikkaku, became the best-selling digital song of 2015 with over one million copies sold. She subsequently released the albums Just Love (2016) and Love It (2017), certified platinum and gold respectively. In 2016, she won the Grand Prix at the 58th Japan Record Awards for her single "Anata no Suki na Tokoro", the first female solo artist to do so since Koda Kumi in 2005. In 2017, she reached a new milestone when becoming the first female artist born in the Heisei era to perform at the prestigious Tokyo Dome as part of the Kana Nishino Dome Tour 2017 "Many Thanks".

Due to her popularity with the Japanese female audience, Nishino appears frequently on fashion magazine covers and she is usually regarded as a fashion icon. It was particularly apparent in her early days due to her association with the Gyaru fashion subculture, leading her music to be referred to as "Gyaru Enka" ("Gyaru heartbreak songs"). In 2009, CNN said that she was the favorite singer of teenage girls in Shibuya, Tokyo. Nishino is also known for her "relatable" lyrics about love. She was awarded "Artist of the Year" two times in 2014 and 2015 by Billboard Japan. Since her debut, she has sold over six million records and over 46 million downloads, making her one of the most successful female artists in the digital chart history of Japan.

On January 8, 2019, Nishino announced an "indefinite" hiatus starting on February 3 of the same year and returned to the music industry in 2024.

== Career ==
=== 1989–2007: Early life and career beginnings ===
Kana Nishino was born on March 18, 1989, in Matsusaka, Mie Prefecture. From an early age, Nishino had an interest in living abroad, so she decided to stay with a host family in Guam when she was in the fifth grade of elementary school and in Los Angeles when she was in her first year of high school. After returning home from Los Angeles, she began learning folk songs under the tutelage of an acquaintance of her mother's.

In 2005, when Nishino was 16 years old, her mother signed her up for the "Super Heroine Audition Miss Phoenix," an audition jointly held by Kadokawa Pictures and Sony Music Artists Inc. Despite the fact that it was an actress audition, Nishino's singing voice was discovered among the 40,000 applicants. In 2006, she signed a contract with Sony Music Japan and spent three years of high school as a preparation period, learning Tsugaru folk songs, taking vocal training and constantly practicing with her mother. In 2007, while preparing for her debut, she began to attend an undisclosed university to study English literature. At the time she met Australian duo Nervo, who offered Nishino a song called "I Don't Wanna Know" for use in her music project. Nishino rewrote the song's lyrics into Japanese herself, and re-titled it "I."

=== 2008–2009: Debut and breakthrough ===
On February 20, 2008, Nishino made her major label debut with the single "I." Ahead of the CD release, a download version of the single was simultaneously distributed in Japan and the United States. In December 2007, the previous year, a Christmas version of the debut single, "*I* ~Merry Christmas ver.~" was also available for download. The CD single of "I" reached number 155 on the Oricon Singles Chart and charted for one week, selling around 500 copies. The song did a lot better on Billboard Japan Hot 100, reaching number 10 on that chart. On April 23, 2008, Nishino released her second single "Glowly Days." The single reached number 126 on the Oricon charts and charted for 2 weeks, while it peaked at number 22 on the Japan Hot 100. After two unsuccessful singles, Nishino was chosen to sing the second ending theme for the anime Soul Eater. "Style." was released as her third single and was her highest selling single in 2008 due to the popularity of the anime series, peaking at number 57 on Oricon. In September 2008, about six months after her debut, she participated in Cyndi Lauper's Japan tour, performing as the opening act at all four venues. In December 2008, Nishino was appointed as the youngest ever "Mie Prefecture Tourism Ambassador" by the Governor of Mie Prefecture, Akihiko Noro.

On January 28, 2009, Nishino released her fourth single, "Make Up." It reached number 119 on the Oricon Chart and charted for one week. Meanwhile, it peaked at number 39 on the Japan Hot 100. After her first four singles, her music took a more R&B feel to it. Nishino released her fifth single "Tookutemo feat. Wise" on March 18, 2009, which was also her 20th birthday. The song became Nishino's breakthrough, becoming her first release to chart in the Oricon top 50 by charting at number 40. "Tookutemo feat. Wise" was certified double platinum by the RIAJ for selling over 500,000 legal downloads, her first song to receive a certification by the RIAJ for digital sales. The song also peaked at number 17 on the Japan Hot 100. Wise's digital single "Aenakutemo feat. Kana Nishino" debuted at number 9 on the RIAJ Digital Track Chart.

Nishino released her sixth single "Kimi ni Aitaku Naru Kara" on June 3, 2009. The single hit number 19 on the Oricon weekly single charting, being her best-selling single release of the six. The digital version of the single debuted at number 5 on the RIAJ Digital Track Chart. "Kimi ni Aitaku Naru Kara" was certified double platinum for ringtone sales of 500,000 downloads, as well as double platinum four selling over 500,000 full-length downloads. With this song she made her first appearance on TV Asahi's Music Station on July 10, 2009. Nishino's debut album Love One. was released on June 24, 2009. Commercially, the record peaked at number four on the Oricon Albums Chart in Japan and remained on the chart for 85 weeks.

Nishino released her seventh single "Motto..." on October 21, 2009. The song debuted at the number 1 spot on the RIAJ Digital Track Chart. The RIAJ certified the track triple platinum for ringtone downloads of over 750,000 units. By February 2014, "Motto..." was certified million for full-length downloads of over 1,000,000 units. Nishino released the double A-side single "Dear.../Maybe" on December 2, 2009. "Dear..." was certified triple platinum by the RIAJ for ringtone downloads of over 750,000 units, while also being certified million for selling over one million full-length downloads. "Maybe" was certified gold for selling over 100,000 cellphone downloads.

=== 2010–2012: Big success in Japan with To Love, Thank you, Love and Love Place ===
Nishino released her ninth single "Best Friend" on February 24, 2010. "Best Friend" was certified million in two different categories by the RIAJ for selling over one million ringtone downloads, along with selling one million full-length downloads. May 21, 2010, saw the release of Nishino's tenth single, "Aitakute Aitakute." The song became her biggest hit to date and was named the hottest selling digital song of the year 2010. "Aitakute Aitakute" is listed as one of the best-selling multi-format singles in Japan, with total sales exceeding 5.097 million units (5,000,000 downloads and 97,000 physical units). Nishino released her sophomore album To Love on June 23, 2010. The album was extremely successful, making Nishino the first artist born in the Heisei era to top the Oricon Albums Chart. To Love is Nishino's most successful album to date, selling over 750,000 units and staying on the charts for 104 weeks. It was certified triple platinum by the RIAJ in August 2010.

On August 4, 2010, Nishino released her eleventh single, "If." This song was used as the theme and ending song of the movie Naruto Shippuden 4: The Lost Tower. The single was certified triple platinum for ringtone downloads of over 750,000 units; eventually it was also certified million for full-length downloads of over one million units. Her 12th single, "Kimi tte," was released on November 3, 2010. The song was certified million for both ringtone and full-length downloads of over one million units. On December 31, 2010, she competed in the 61st NHK Kōhaku Uta Gassen as a member of the red team, marking her first appearance at the prestigious event.

On February 4, 2011, just three years after her debut, the total number of downloads of nine categories, including distribution to mobile phones such as ringtone downloads, full-length downloads and video clips, as well as PC downloads exceeded 25 million. On February 9, 2011, the single "Distance" was released. "Distance" was certified double platinum for ringtone downloads of 500,000 units, as well as platinum for cellphone downloads of over 100,000 units. She also collaborated with Wise on the single "By your side" which was released on March 16, 2011. Two months later on May 18, 2011, her new single "Esperanza" was released. "Esperanza" was certified double platinum for selling over 500,000 full-length downloads. On June 22, 2011, her third studio album Thank you, Love was successful on the Oricon charts by being number 1 during its first week and was certified double platinum. From July 29 to September 8, 2011, Nishino embarked on her first nationwide hall tour, Kanayan Tour 2011 ~ Summer~ (16 shows), concluding with her first-ever performance at the Nippon Budokan in Tokyo. November 9, 2011, was the day Nishino's fifteenth single "Tatoe Donna ni..." was released. The song was certified double platinum for ringtone downloads of 500,000 units. It was additionally certified triple platinum for full-length downloads of over 750,000 units.

Nishino started off 2012 by releasing her sixteenth single "Sakura, I Love You?" on March 7, 2012, which was certified platinum for selling 250,000 downloads. Her seventeenth single, "Watashitachi," was released on May 23, 2012; it was certified platinum for selling 250,000 downloads. On July 25, 2012, she released her 18th single, "Go For It!!." It was her last number one song on the RIAJ Digital Track Chart before it went defunct on July 27, 2012. On September 5, 2012, Nishino released her 4th album called Love Place. It was commercially successful on the Oricon Albums Chart, debuting at the runner-up spot and was certified platinum by the RIAJ. Nishino promoted Love Place by embarking on her first arena tour titled Kanayan Tour 2012 ~Arena~ between October 13, 2012, to November 24, 2012. On November 7, 2012, Nishino released her nineteenth single "Always," which was certified gold for selling 100,000 PC downloads. The album Love Place won the Japan Record Award for the Best Album at the 54th Japan Record Awards held on December 30 of the same year.

=== 2013–2014: Best albums and With Love ===
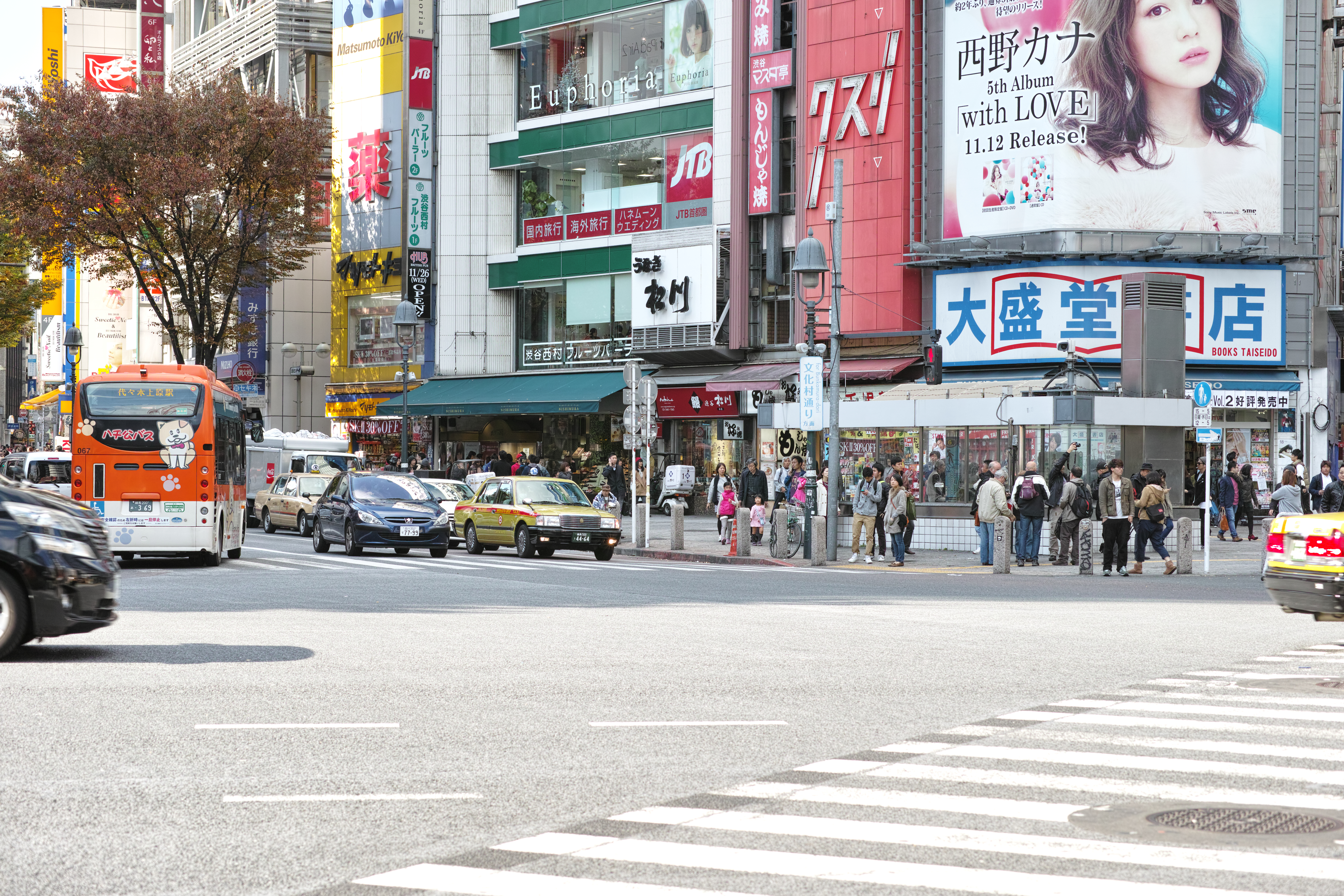
Nishino's picture promoted her album with LOVE on a billboard in Shibuya in 2014.

From January 11, 2013, to March 26, 2013, Nishino embarked on the hall tour Kanayan Tour 2013 〜Spring〜. Three months later, Nishino released two more singles: "Believe" in June followed by "Namidairo" in August. Both songs were certified platinum by the RIAJ for selling over 250,000 downloads. To celebrate her 5th anniversary in the music industry, Nishino announced her two greatest hits albums, Love Collection ~pink~ and Love Collection ~mint~, to be released simultaneously on September 4, 2013. The mint version reached number 1 on the Oricon Albums Chart, with the pink version charting at number 2. The two albums sold almost 650,000 copies combined. A month later, she released another single, "Sayonara," which was certified platinum for selling 250,000 downloads. She was the best-selling female solo artist in Japan for the year.

From March 8, 2014, to April 13, 2014, Nishino embarked on the arena tour titled Love Collection Tour 〜pink & mint〜. Seven months later into 2014, she released her 23rd single "We Don't Stop." The single sold 250,000 downloads, earning it a platinum certification from the RIAJ. Her 24th single, "Darling," was released on August 13, 2014. It became a long-term hit, reaching No. 1 on iTunes, Recochoku and other music distribution sites. "Darling" was eventually certified triple platinum for selling 750,000 downloads. She eventually released the ballad "Suki" on October 15, 2014, which was certified platinum for selling 250,000 downloads. On November 12, 2014, she released her fifth album With Love. The album reached number 1 on the Oricon Albums Chart and was certified platinum. For the year, she was the 2nd best-selling female solo artist.

=== 2015–2016: Japan Record Awards win and other projects ===
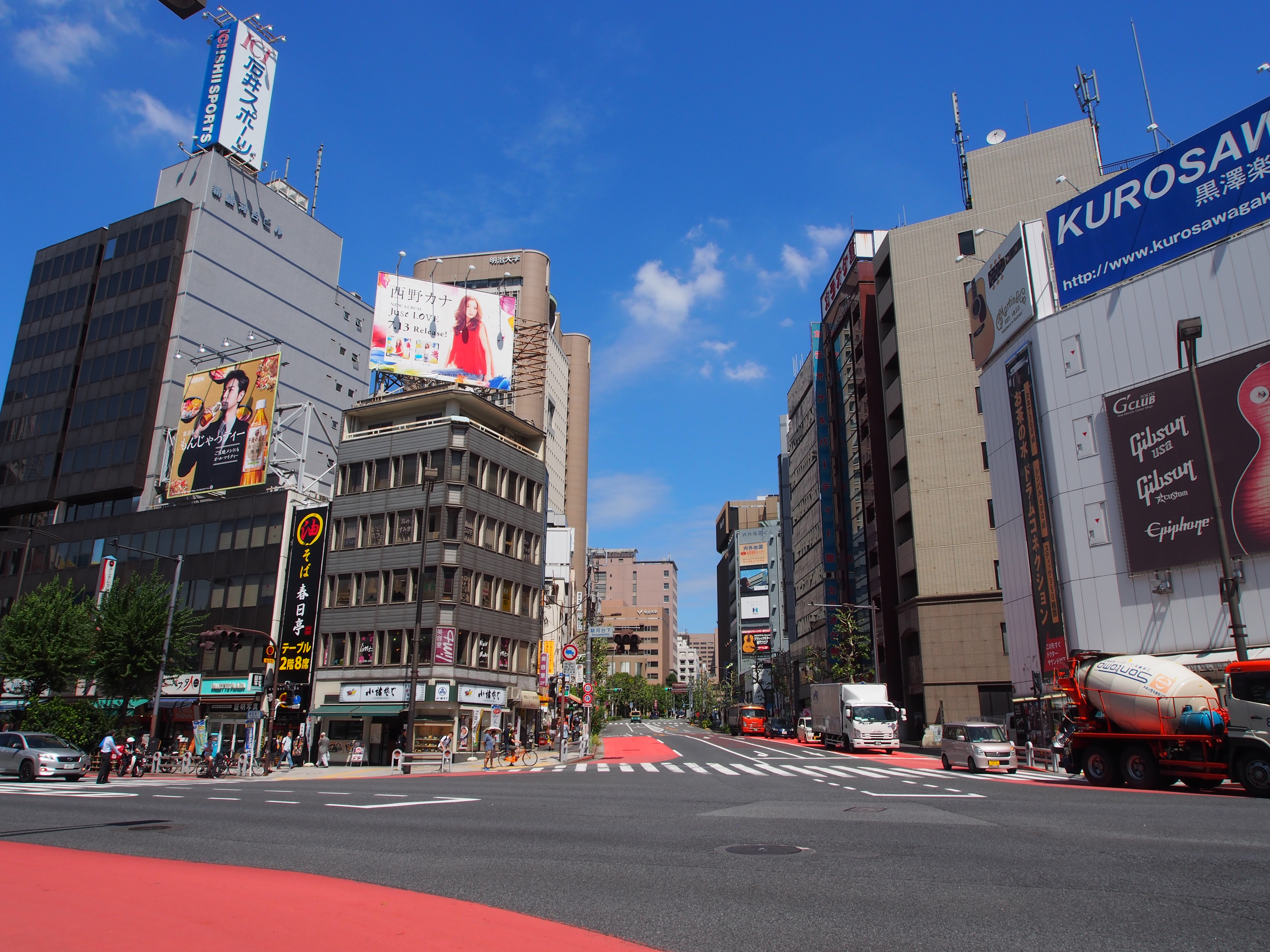
Just Love being promoted on a roof billboard at Kanda Suzuran Shopping District.

After the long chart run of her single "Darling," she released another country music-themed single on April 29, 2015, called "Moshimo Unmei no Hito ga Iru no Nara." The single was certified Double Platinum by the RIAJ for being downloaded more than 500,000 times by June 2015. On September 9, 2015, Nishino released another country music-themed single called "Torisetsu," which was used as the theme song for the movie Heroine Shikkaku. The song became a cultural phenomenon for its depiction of a maiden's heart, reaching No. 1 on iTunes and other music distribution sites. "Torisetsu" was certified million for selling one million downloads, becoming Nishino's final song to do so to date. On November 18, 2015, she simultaneously released two greatest hits albums, Secret Collection: Red and Secret Collection: Green, which are compilations of B-side songs. The green version reached number 2 on the Oricon Albums Chart, while the red version placed number 3, selling almost 250,000 copies as a pair. A new song "No.1" was used as the theme song for the dorama Okitegami Kyoko no Biboroku and was certified Platinum for being downloaded more than 250,000 times. She was the best-selling female solo artist in Japan in 2015 with 303,365 copies sold.

Her 28th single "Anata no Suki na Tokoro" was released on April 27, 2016. The song helped her win the Grand Prix at the 58th Japan Record Awards, making her the first female solo artist to do so since Kumi Koda in 2005. On July 13, 2016, she released her sixth studio album Just Love. The album reached number 1 on the Oricon Albums Chart for two weeks, making Nishino the first artist born in the Heisei era to accomplish this. On October 26, 2016, the 29th single "Dear Bride" was released. The single helped her win the Grand Prix at the 49th Japan Cable Awards.

=== 2017–2019: 10th anniversary, hiatus and marriage ===
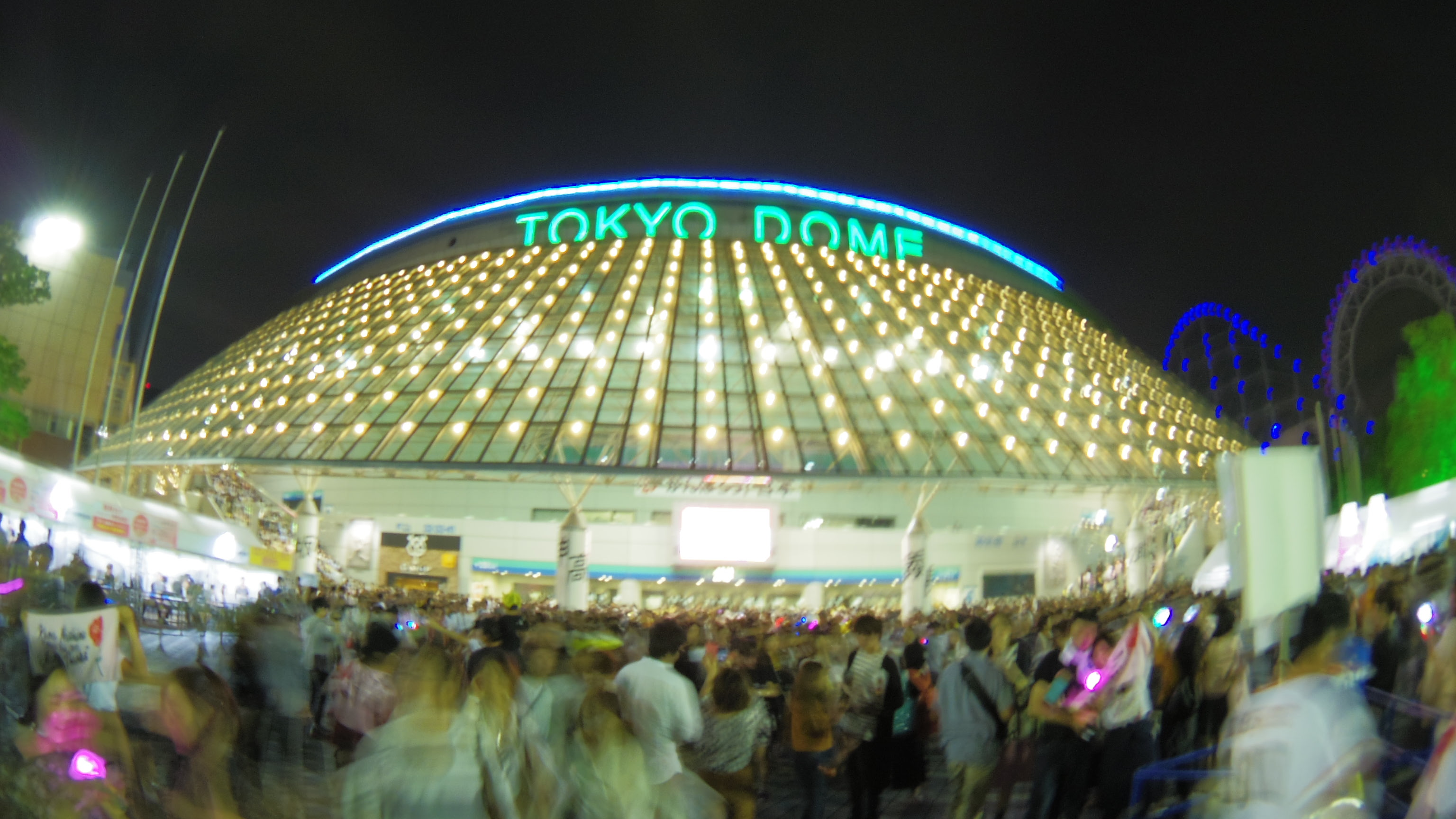
A Kana Nishino concert at Tokyo Dome in 2017

Nishino was selected as a winner of the 2016 ISUM Bridal Music Awards held on March 15, 2017. On May 3, 2017, Nishino released her 30th single, "Pa". Her 31st single, "Girls," was released on July 26, 2017. By the end of summer 2017, Nishino has decided to hold her first solo two-large dome tour, Kana Nishino Dome Tour 2017" Many Thanks." She performed the tour at Kyocera Dome Osaka on August 26 and 27, 2017 and Tokyo Dome on September 23 and 24, 2017. After the lives were complete, Nishino officially became the youngest solo female artist to hold concerts in both of those venues. She released her 32nd single "Te wo Tsunagu Riyuu" on October 18, 2017. One month later, she released her seventh studio album Love It on November 15, 2017.

Nishino released her 33rd single, "I Love You," on April 18, 2018. From May 19, 2018, to July 25, 2018, she held her first nationwide hall tour in seven years, the 2018 Love It Tour; it was followed by the 2018 National Arena Tour Love It Tour: 10th Anniversary from August 28, 2018, to October 10, 2018, with a total of 38 shows, attracting a total of 200,000 people. "Bedtime Story" was released as her 34th single on September 12, 2018. On November 21, 2018, she released two best albums Love Collection 2: Pink and Love Collection 2: Mint simultaneously to commemorate the 10th anniversary of her debut. On December 25, 2018, it was announced on the official Twitter account that a live viewing of "Kana Nishino Love Collection Live 2019" would be held, with the performance on the final day, February 3, being broadcast live to movie theaters in all 47 prefectures across Japan, as well as Taiwan and Hong Kong. On January 8, 2019, Nishino announced on her official website and in her official fan club that she would be taking an indefinite hiatus, which started after her performance at Yokohama Arena for "Kana Nishino Love Collection Live 2019" on February 3, 2019.

=== 2024–present: Comeback to the music industry, 15th Anniversary, touring and leaving Sony Music Artists ===
On February 14, 2024, Nishino released her greatest hits album All Time Best: Love Collection 15th Anniversary and video album MV Collection: All Time Best 15th Anniversary. She announced her returning to the music industry on June 25, 2024, by releasing the single "Eyes on You" on July 5, the EP Love Again on September 18, and holding the concert Kana Nishino Love Again Live 2024 at Yokohama Arena on November 13 and 14, the same venue as her last concert before her hiatus. The EP Love Again peaked at number 2 on the Billboard Japan Hot Albums chart and on the Oricon Albums chart, selling 100,365 copies by the end of 2024 according to the latter. The title track "Eyes on You" reached number 16 on the Billboard Japan Hot 100.

On November 13, 2024, Nishino announced the nationwide arena tour "Fall In Love With You Again Tour 2025" which took place in five different cities between April and June 2025. On December 13, 2024, it was announced that Nishino would appear on the 75th NHK Kōhaku Uta Gassen on December 31, marking her first appearance on the prestigious year-end show since 2018 and her 10th overall. She performed a medley of the songs "Best Friend" and "Eyes on You". On May 9, 2025, she released the digital single "With You" which peaked at number 77 on the Billboard Japan Hot 100. On June 22, 2025, she announced a two-day Special Live "Christmas Magic" which took place on December 17 and 18, 2025, at K-Arena Yokohama. On July 11, 2025, she appeared for the first time on the popular YouTube Channel The First Take and performed a rendition of her hit song, "Aitakute, Aitakute". On July 23, she appeared a second time to perform a band version of her digital single "Magical Starshine Makeup" which was released the same day.

On February 5, 2026, she released the digital single “Kiminosei”. Later that month, on February 20, she announced the Heart Beat National Hall Tour, which spanned 14 cities across Japan and included 24 performances from June to September 2026. On May 15, 2026, she released the digital song "Love Beat", featuring the Japanese girl group NiziU, ahead of the physical and digital release of the EP bearing the same title on May 27. On June 19, it was announced that Nishino would perform the opening theme for the second part of season 4 of the anime Ascendance of a Bookworm. The song, titled “Power of Love”, was released digitally on July 10. The physical EP of the same name came out on August 26, reaching number 17 on the Oricon Weekly Album Chart.

On October 1, 2026, Nishino announced that she had parted ways with Sony Music Artists, the talent management agency affiliated with Sony Music Japan, after 18 years.

== Personal life ==
On January 8, 2019, Nishino announced that she would be taking an indefinite hiatus on her official Twitter, official website and official fan club. On February 3, the activity was suspended with the performance of "Kana Nishino Love Collection Live 2019" at the Yokohama Arena. Nishino announced that she married her former manager on her 30th birthday.

On August 5, 2023, Nishino and her husband welcomed the birth of their first child.

== Artistry ==
The songs she sang at the audition were "Shooting Star" by Hattan Amika and "The Perfect Vision" by Minmi. She later performed with her idol Minmi. She lists J.Lo by Jennifer Lopez, The Marshall Mathers LP by Eminem and "Blue Velvet" by Shizuka Kudo as albums and songs that shocked her when she was in elementary school. Eminem in particular was what got her started listening to hip hop. She was into reggae from junior high school to her first year of college. After studying abroad in the United States, she became obsessed with Western music, and was fascinated by hip hop, R&B and reggae, as well as female singers such as Christina Aguilera, Jennifer Lopez, and Ciara. Nishino doesn't usually listen to Japanese pop music, preferring more indie-ish stuff like Japanese reggae. Most of her songs released as singles are about love or friendship, but the B-sides and album tracks tend to be club songs or R&B songs with plenty of English lyrics.

== Discography ==
- Love One. (2009)
- To Love (2010)
- Thank You, Love (2011)
- Love Place (2012)
- With Love (2014)
- Just Love (2016)
- Love It (2017)

== Million download certification by RIAJ ==
Excluding ringtone (short version) in this Table.

Release day of digit format	Work
2009-10-14	Motto (もっと...)
2009-11-25	Dear…
2010-02-17	Best Friend
2010-05-12	Aitakute Aitakute (会いたくて 会いたくて)
2010-07-28	if
2010-10-27	Kimi tte (君って)
2015-09-09	Torisetsu (トリセツ)

== Awards ==
=== MTV Video Music Awards Japan ===
Year	Nominee / work	Award	Result
2010	Motto..	Best Karaokee! Song	Won
2011	Kimitte	Best Pop Video; Best Karaokee! Song	Nominated
2011	To Love	Best Album	Won
2012	Tatoe Donna ni..	Best Female Artist Video	Nominated
2012	Esperanza	Best Karaokee! Song	Nominated
2013	Always	Best Female Artist Video	Won
2013	Love Place	Best Album	Nominated
2013	Always	Best Karaokee! Song	Nominated
2014	Believe	Best Pop Video	Nominated
2016	Anata no Suki na Tokoro	Best Female Artist Video	Nominated
2016	Just Love	Best Album	Nominated
2016	Anata no Suki na Tokoro	Best Pop Video	Nominated
2017	Pa	Best Female Artist Video	Won

=== Japan Record Awards ===
The Japan Record Awards is a major music awards show held annually in Japan by the Japan Composer's Association.

Year	Nominee / work	Award	Result
2010	to LOVE	Excellence Album Award	Won
2011	Esperanza	Grand Prix	Nominated
2011	Esperanza	Excellent Work Award	Won
2012	GO FOR IT!!	Grand Prix	Nominated
2012	GO FOR IT!!	Outstanding Works Award	Won
2012	Love Place	the Best Album Award	Won
2013	Sayonara	Grand Prix	Nominated
2013	Sayonara	Outstanding Works Award	Won
2014	Darling	Grand Prix	Nominated
2014	Darling	Outstanding Works Award	Won
2015	Torisetsu	Grand Prix	Nominated
2015	Torisetsu	Outstanding Works Award	Won
2016	Anata no Sukina Tokoro	Grand Prix	Won
2016	Anata no Sukina Tokoro	Outstanding Works Award	Won
2017	Te o Tsunagu Riyuu	Grand Prix	Nominated
2017	Te o Tsunagu Riyuu	Outstanding Works Award	Won
2018	Bedtime Story	Grand Prix	Nominated
2018	Bedtime Story	Outstanding Works Award	Won

=== Japan Cable Awards ===
Year	Nominee / work	Award	Result
2010	Kimitte	Music Excellence Award	Won
2011	Tatoe Donna ni...	Music Excellence Award	Won
2012	Watashitachi	Music Excellence Award	Won
2013	Sayonara	Music Excellence Award	Won
2014	Darling	Music Excellence Award	Won
2015	Torisetsu	Music Excellence Award	Won
2016	Dear Bride	Music Excellence Award	Won
2016	Dear Bride	Grand Prix Winner	Won
2017	Te Wo Tsunagu Riyuu	Music Excellence Award	Won

=== Japan Gold Disc Award ===
Year	Nominee / work	Award	Result
2011	to LOVE	Best 5 Albums	Won
2011	Aitakute Aitakute	Song Of The Year By Download	Won
2011	if	Best 5 Songs By Download	Won
2011	Best Friend	Best 5 Songs By Download	Won
2013	Tatoe Donna ni...	Best 5 Songs By Download	Won
2015	Darling	Best 5 Songs By Download	Won
2016	Torisetsu	Song Of The Year By Download	Won
2016	Torisetsu	Best 5 Songs By Download	Won
2016	Moshimo Unmei no Hito ga Iru no Nara	Best 5 Songs By Download	Won

=== Billboard Japan Music Awards ===
Year	Nominee / work	Award	Result
2010	Kana Nishino	Best Pop Artist	Nominated
2014	Kana Nishino	Artist of the Year	Won
2015	Kana Nishino	Artist of the Year	Won

=== Chinese Music Awards ===
Year	Nominee / work	Award	Result
2014	Kana Nishino	Asia's Most Influential Artist	Won
