= Kimi tte =

Single by Kana Nishino

from the album Thank You, Love
- B-side: "Christmas Love"; "Girls Girls"
- Released: October 27, 2010
- Genre: J-pop, R&B
- Length: 5:31
- Label: SME Records
- Songwriters: Kana Nishino, Saeki YouthK
- Producer: Kōtarō Egami

Kana Nishino singles chronology
"If" (2010)	"Kimi tte" (2010)	"Distance" (2011)

Alternative cover
- First press cover

"Kimi tte" (君って; "You") is a song by Japanese pop singer Kana Nishino. It was released as her 12th single on November 3, 2010. The song was marketed as a "heart-warming tender" mid-tempo ballad in the initial press release, also describing the lyrics, as being about "scaling up passion to love."

== Promotion ==
The song was used as the insert theme song for the Fuji TV drama Freeter, Ie o Kau. One of the B-sides of the single, "Girls Girls," was used as an image song for fashion magazine Vivi. Nishino promoted the single with several television lives, such as on SMAP×SMAP on November 1, Music Japan on November 7 and Music Station on November 12.

== Track listing ==
No.	Title	Lyrics	Music	Arranger(s)	Length
1.	"Kimi tte"	Kana Nishino	Saeki YouthK	Kōtarō Egami	5:31
2.	"Christmas Love"	Nishino, Giorgio Cancemi	Cancemi	Cancemi	4:39
3.	"Girls Girls"	Nishino, DJ Mass, Olivia Burrell	DJ Mass, Toshihiro Takira, Olivia Burrell, Takashi Yamaguchi	VIVID Neon* & Takashi Yamaguchi	3:24

== Charts ==
Chart (2010)	Peak position
Billboard Japan Adult Contemporary Airplay	13
Billboard Japan Hot 100	3
Oricon daily singles	2
Oricon weekly singles	3
Oricon monthly singles	11
Oricon yearly singles	87
RIAJ Digital Track Chart weekly top 100	1
RIAJ Digital Track Chart yearly top 100	8

=== Certifications and sales ===
Chart	Amount
Oricon physical sales	98,000
RIAJ physical shipping certification	Gold (100,000+)
RIAJ ringtone downloads	Million (1,000,000+)
RIAJ full-length cellphone downloads	Triple platinum (750,000+)
RIAJ streaming	Gold (50,000,000)

=== Release history ===
Region	Date	Format
Japan	October 6, 2010	Ringtone
Japan	October 27, 2010	Full-length cellphone download
Japan	November 3, 2010	CD
Japan	November 20, 2010	Rental CD
