= Juju discography =

- Studio albums: 8
- EPs: 2
- Live albums: 2
- Compilation albums: 3
- Tribute albums: 4
- Singles: 31
- Video albums: 5

The discography of Japanese pop and jazz vocalist Juju consists of eight studio albums, four tribute albums, two extended plays, two live albums, five video albums and numerous singles. Juju debuted as a singer in 2001, collaborating with artists such as DJ Masterkey, Spontania (then known as Hi-Timez) and worked on the soundtrack for the film Kyōki no Sakura.

In 2004 while still based in New York, Juju released her debut single with Sony Music Entertainment Japan, "Hikari no Naka e". She had her first successful single in 2006 with the song "Kiseki o Nozomu Nara...", however reached widespread fame in 2008 when "Kimi no Subete ni", the song of her long-time collaborators, Spontania, became a hit single, managing to be certified Million by the RIAJ. This was followed by the successful tracks "Sunao ni Naretara" (2008), an answer song to ""Kimi no Subete ni", and "Ashita ga Kuru Nara" (2009), a duet with R&B singer Jay'ed used as the theme song for the film April Bride (2009).

In 2010, Juju released Request, a tribute album featuring covers of songs by Japanese female vocalists. Led by a cover of My Little Lover's "Hello, Again (Mukashi Kara Aru Basho)", the album was certified double platinum and became Juju's most successful album in her career. In 2014 to celebrate the 10th year since her debut with Sony, she released a follow-up album to this, Request II.

In 2011 and 2013, Juju released albums compiling her renditions of jazz standards, Delicious and Delicious: Juju's Jazz 2nd Dish. In 2012, Juju released an MTV Unplugged album, featuring a live concert recorded in New York. In 2013, Juju recorded Gift, a live concert album collaborating with the Japan Philharmonic Orchestra.

== Studio albums ==
List of albums, with selected chart positions and certifications
Title	Album details	Peak positions			Sales (JPN) (Note: Sales provided by Oricon database and are rounded to the nearest thousand copies.)	Certifications
Title	Album details	JPN	KOR Overseas (Note: Week references for Gaon: Juju, You, Best Story (Love Stories) and Best Story (Life Stories).)	TWN East Asian (Note: Week references for G-Music: "Ashita ga Kuru Nara" 2009 week 38, You 2011 week 29, Request II.)	Sales (JPN)	Certifications
Wonderful Life	Released: October 10, 2007 (JPN); Label: Sony; Formats: CD, digital download, Blu-spec CD	13	—	—	42,000	
What's Love?	Released: March 4, 2009 (JPN); Label: Sony; Formats: CD, digital download, Blu-spec CD	3	—	—	265,000	RIAJ: Platinum
Juju	Released: March 17, 2010 (JPN); Label: Sony; Formats: CD, 2CD, digital download, Blu-spec CD	2	49	—	145,000	RIAJ: Gold
You	Released: July 13, 2011 (JPN); Label: Sony; Formats: CD, digital download, Blu-spec CD	1	43	17	353,000	RIAJ: Platinum
Door	Released: March 5, 2014 (JPN); Label: Sony; Formats: CD, CD/DVD, digital download	2	—	—	106,000	RIAJ: Gold
What You Want	Released: December 9, 2015 (JPN); Label: Sony; Formats: CD, digital download	4	—	—	107,000	RIAJ: Gold
I	Released: February 21, 2018 (JPN); Label: Sony; Formats: CD, digital download	1	—	—	90,000 (Note: Combined sales figures for I: 75,607 (physical sales) + 14,874 (digital sales).)	RIAJ: Gold
The Water	Released: March 5, 2025 (JPN); Label: Sony; Formats: CD, digital download	7	—	—	15,747	
"—" denotes items that did not chart.

== Cover albums ==
List of cover albums, with selected chart positions
Title	Album details	Peak positions		Sales (JPN)	Certifications
Title	Album details	JPN	TWN East Asian	Sales (JPN)	Certifications
Request	Released: September 29, 2010 (JPN); Label: Sony; Formats: CD, digital download, Blu-spec CD	1	—	482,000	RIAJ: 2× Platinum
Delicious	Released: November 30, 2011 (JPN); Label: Sony; Formats: CD, digital download, Blu-spec CD, LP record	5	—	120,000	RIAJ: Gold
Delicious: Juju's Jazz 2nd Dish	Released: June 26, 2013 (JPN); Label: Sony; Formats: CD, digital download	11	—	53,000	
Request II	Released: December 3, 2014 (JPN); Label: Sony; Formats: CD, digital download	3	18	115,000	RIAJ: Gold
Snack Juju: Yoru no Request	Released: October 26, 2016 (JPN); Label: Sony; Formats: CD, digital download	4	—	152,000 (Note: Combined sales figures for Snack JUJU ~Yoru no Request~: 135,143 (physical sales) + 17,053 (digital sales).)	RIAJ: Gold
Delicious: Juju's Jazz 3rd Dish	Released: December 5, 2018 (JPN); Label: Sony; Formats: CD, digital download	11	—	23,000	
Ore no Request	Released: October 21, 2020 (JPN); Label: Sony; Formats: CD, digital download	7	—	80,000 (Note: Combined sales figures for Ore no Request: 70,314 (physical sales) + 10,642 (digital sales).)	
Yūmin o Meguru Monogatari (ユーミンをめぐる物語)	Released: March 16, 2022 (JPN); Label: Sony; Formats: CD, digital download	5	—	29,932	
Snack Juju: Night Request "Mama Came Back"	Released: November 1, 2023 (JPN); Label: Sony; Formats: CD, digital download	6	—	15,925	

== Extended plays ==
List of extended plays, with selected chart positions
Title	Album details	Peak positions	Sales (JPN)
Title	Album details	JPN	Sales (JPN)
Open Your Heart: Sugao no Mama de (素顔のままで; "Staying Honest")	Released: June 6, 2007 (JPN); Label: Sony; Formats: CD, digital download	16	36,000
My Life	Released: June 11, 2008 (JPN); Label: Sony; Formats: CD, digital download	117	2,000

== Compilation albums ==
List of albums, with selected chart positions
Title	Album details	Peak positions		Sales (JPN)	Certifications
Title	Album details	JPN	KOR Overseas	Sales (JPN)	Certifications
Best Story (Love Stories)	Released: November 7, 2012 (JPN); Label: Sony; Formats: CD, digital download	2	45	285,000	RIAJ: Platinum
Best Story (Life Stories)	Released: November 7, 2012 (JPN); Label: Sony; Formats: CD, digital download	1	44	308,000	RIAJ: Platinum
Timeless	Western cover compilation album; Released: March 9, 2016 (JPN); Label: Sony; Formats: CD, digital download	5	—	19,000	
Your Story	Released: April 8, 2020 (JPN); Label: Sony; Formats: CD, digital download	1	—	174,000 (Note: Combined sales figures for Your Story: 161,228 (physical sales) + 13,536 (digital sales).)	RIAJ: Gold

== Live albums ==
List of albums, with selected chart positions
Title	Album details	Peak positions	Sales (JPN)
Title	Album details	JPN	Sales (JPN)
MTV Unplugged Juju	Released: August 1, 2012 (JPN); Label: Sony; Formats: CD, digital download	15	20,000
Gift	Released: December 11, 2013 (JPN); Label: Sony; Formats: CD, digital download	15	24,000
JUJU BIG BAND JAZZ LIVE “So Delicious, So Good”	Released: April 18, 2018 (JPN); Label: Sony; Formats: CD, digital download	22	

== Singles ==
=== As a lead artist ===
List of singles, with selected chart positions and certifications
Title	Year	Peak chart positions			Sales (JPN)	Certifications	Album
Title	Year	JPN Oricon	JPN Hot 100 (Note: Sources for chart positions are as follows: "Kiseki o Nozomu Nara...", "Donna ni Tōkute mo...", "My Life", "Kimi no Subete ni", "Sora", "Sunao ni Naretara", "Yasashisa de Afureru Yō ni", "Ashita ga Kuru Nara", "Present", "Sakura Ame", "Trust in You", "Hello, Again (Mukashi Kara Aru Basho)", "There Will Be Love There (Ai no Aru Basho)", "Tsutsumikomu Yō ni", "Kono Yoru o Tomete yo", "Sayonara no Kawari ni", "Mata Ashita...", "You", "Beloved", "Eien wa Tada no Ichibyō Kara", "Lullaby of Birdland", "Time for Christmas", "Sign", "All You Need Is Love", "Tadaima", "Arigatō", "Dreamer", "Distance", "Take Five", "Mamotte Agetai", "Hoshizukiyo", "Door", "Hot Stuff", "Last Scene", "Anniversary", "Ito", "Hold Me, Hold You", "Playback", "With You", "What You Want".)	TWN East Asian	Sales (JPN)	Certifications	Album
"Hikari no Naka e" (光の中へ; "Into the Light")	2004	—	—	—			Open Your Heart
"Cravin'"	2004	—	—	—			Open Your Heart
"Kiseki o Nozomu Nara..." (奇跡を望むなら...; "If You Wish for a Miracle...") (Note: Re-released in 2007 as "Kiseki o Nozomu Nara...Xmas Story".)	2006	85	62 (Note: Charted in 2012.)	—	9,000	RIAJ (digital): 2× Platinum	Wonderful Life
"Natsu no Hana" (ナツノハナ; "Summer Flower")	2007	78	—	—	7,000		Wonderful Life
"Wish for Snow"	2007	55	—	—	3,000		Non-album single
"Donna ni Tōkute mo..." (どんなに遠くても...; "No Matter How Far...")	2008	84	56	—	3,000		What's Love?
"Sora" (空; "Sky")	2008	88	49	—	1,000		What's Love?
"Sunao ni Naretara" (素直になれたら; "If I Could Be Honest") (Juju featuring Spontania)	2008	6	2	—	84,000	RIAJ (ringtone): Million; RIAJ (digital): Million; RIAJ (physical): Gold	What's Love?
"I Can Be Free"	2008	6	—	—			What's Love?
"Yasashisa de Afureru Yō ni" (やさしさで溢れるように; "Like It's Overflowing with Kindness")	2009	11	3	—	18,000	RIAJ (ringtone): 3× Platinum; RIAJ (digital): Million; RIAJ (streaming): Platinum	What's Love?
"Ashita ga Kuru Nara" (明日がくるなら; "If Tomorrow Comes") (Juju with Jay'ed)	2009	2	1	18	150,000	RIAJ (ringtone): Million; RIAJ (cellphone): Million; RIAJ (PC): Gold; RIAJ (physical): Gold	Juju
"Present"	2009	29	14	—	7,000	RIAJ (cellphone): Gold	Juju
"Sakura Ame" (桜雨; "Cherry Blossom Rain")	2010	20	8	—	8,000	RIAJ (cellphone): Gold	Juju
"Ready for Love"	2010	20	—	—	8,000		Juju
"S.H.E."	2010	20	—	—	8,000		Juju
"Last Kiss"	2010	20	—	—	8,000		Request
"Trust in You"	2010	30	18	—	7,000	RIAJ (cellphone): Gold	You
"Hello, Again (Mukashi Kara Aru Basho)" (昔からある場所; "A Place from Long Ago")	2010	15	19	—	24,000	RIAJ (ringtone): 2× Platinum; RIAJ (cellphone): 2× Platinum	Request
"Kono Yoru o Tomete yo" (この夜を止めてよ; "Stop this Night")	2010	10	12	—	80,000	RIAJ (ringtone): 3× Platinum; RIAJ (digital): Million; RIAJ (physical): Gold; RIAJ (streaming): Gold	You
"Negai" (願い; "Wish")	2011	14	— (Note: Charted at number 35 on the Adult Contemporary Airplay chart.)	—	12,000	RIAJ (digital): Gold	You
"Sayonara no Kawari ni" (さよならの代わりに; "Instead of a Goodbye")	2011	14	39	—	12,000	RIAJ (digital): Gold	You
"Mata Ashita..." (また明日...; "See You Tomorrow...")	2011	9	11	—	47,000	RIAJ (ringtone): 2× Platinum; RIAJ (cellphone): 2× Platinum	You
"You"	2011	28	65	—	6,000		You
"Beloved"	2011	28	92	—	6,000		Non-album single
"Lullaby of Birdland"	2011	59	30	—	3,000		Delicious
"Mizuiro no Kage" (みずいろの影; "Aqua Shadow")	2011	59	—	—	3,000		Delicious
"Sign"	2012	11	8	—	26,000	RIAJ (digital): Platinum	Door
"Tadaima" (ただいま; "I'm Home!")	2012	7	6	—	29,000	RIAJ (digital): Platinum	Door
"Arigatō" (ありがとう; "Thank You")	2012	10	24	—	13,000		Door
"Dreamer"	2013	20	10	—	7,000		Door
"Distance"	2013	14	8	—	13,000	RIAJ (digital): Gold	Door
"Mamotte Agetai" (守ってあげたい; "I Want to Protect You")	2013	27	7	—	8,000	RIAJ (digital): Gold	Door
"Door"	2014	25	30	—	8,000		Door
"Hot Stuff"	2014	25	7	—	8,000	RIAJ (digital): Gold	Door
"Last Scene" (ラストシーン, Rasuto Shīn)	2014	7	5	—	38,000	RIAJ (digital): Platinum	What You Want
"Hold Me, Hold You"	2015	15	13	—	8,000		What You Want
"Hajimari wa Itsumo Gūzen ni" (始まりはいつも突然に; "Beginnings Are Always Out of the Blue")	2015	15	— (Note: Charted at number 53 on the Adult Contemporary Airplay chart.)	—	8,000		What You Want
"Playback"	2015	10	4	—	15,000	RIAJ (digital): Gold	What You Want
"With You"	2015	15	20	—	6,000		What You Want
"What You Want"	2015	26	8	—	11,000	RIAJ (digital): Gold	What You Want
"Roppongi Shinjuu"	2016	17	22	—	8,000		Snack JUJU ~Yoru no Request~
"Love Is Over"	2016	17	—	—	8,000		Snack JUJU ~Yoru no Request~
"Believe Believe"	2016	25	27	—	5,000		I
"Anata Igai Daremo Aisenai"	2016	25	—	—	5,000		Non-album single
"Because of You"	2017	24	56	—	4,000		I
"Iiwake"	2017	11	12	—	6,000		I
"Tokyo"	2018	17	6	—	7,000	RIAJ (digital): Gold	I
"Metro"	2018	20	55	—	3,000		Delicious ~JUJU's Jazz 3rd Dish~
"Mirai" (ミライ; "Future")	2019	23	36	—	4,000		Your Story
"Stayin' Alive"	2020	12	28	—	11,000		Your Story
"Kanade"	2020	19	—	—	5,000		Ore no Request
"La La La Love Song"	2020	19	—	—	5,000		Ore no Request
"Kotae Awase" (こたえあわせ; "Checking Answers")	2021	15	40	—	6,098		Non-album singles
"Chiisana Uta" (小さな歌; "Little Songs")	2025	9	—	—	4,484		Non-album singles
"—" denotes items that did not chart, were released before the creation of the Billboard Japan Hot 100 or were not released in that territory.

=== As a featured artist ===
List of singles, with selected chart positions and certifications
Title	Year	Peak chart positions			Sales (JPN)	Certifications	Album
Title	Year	JPN Oricon	JPN Hot 100	JPN RIAJ Digital Track Chart (Note: The RIAJ Digital Track Chart is a depreciated chart that ran from 2009 until early 2012 and tracked full-length cellphone downloads.) (Note: Sources for chart positions are as follows: "The Rose", "Last Vacation", "Tsutsumikomu Yō ni...", "There Will Be Love There (Ai no Aru Basho)", "Eien wa Tada no Ichibyō Kara", "Mō Koi Nante Shinai". "Soba ni Ite", "First Love", "Time Goes By", "Will", "Gips", "Kotoba ni Dekinai", "Love Again", "Hana ga Meguru Tokoro e".)	Sales (JPN)	Certifications	Album
"In-Mail" (Dohzi-T featuring Juju)	2003	79	—	—	4,000		Dai San no Otoko
"Kimi no Subete ni" (君のすべてに; "All of You") (Spontania featuring Juju)	2008	7	3	—	83,000	RIAJ (ringtone): Million; RIAJ (digital): Million; RIAJ (physical): Gold	Music
"Last Vacation" (DJ Hasebe featuring Ryo-Z, Pes (from Rip Slyme) & Juju)	2010	—	—	34			Something Wonderful
"Eien wa Tada no Ichibyō Kara" (永遠はただの一秒から; "Forever Is Just a Second Away") (Jay'ed featuring Juju)	2011	25	9	4	6,000		Your Voice
"Time for Christmas" (Glay featuring Juju)	2011	—	63	—			Hope and the Silver Sunrise
"All You Need Is Love" (among Japan United with Music)	2012	11	11	—	26,000		Non-album single
"Akai Kajitsu" (赤い果実; "Red fruit") (Fujifabric featuring Juju)	2021	—	—	—			I Love You
"—" denotes items that did not chart, were released before the creation of the Billboard Japan Hot 100 or were not released in that territory.

=== Promotional singles ===
List of singles, with selected chart positions
Title	Year	Peak chart positions		Certifications	Album
Title	Year	JPN Hot 100	JPN RIAJ Digital Track Chart	Certifications	Album
"Wet Dreams" (Juju featuring Kieru Makyu)	2001	—	—		Non-album singles
"Infatuation"	2004	—	—		Non-album singles
"My Life"	2008	50	—		My Life / What's Love?
"The Rose"	2009	—	14	RIAJ (digital): Gold	"Ashita ga Kuru Nara" (single)
"There Will Be Love There (Ai no Aru Basho)" (愛のある場所; "Place with Love")	2010	43	21		Request
"Tsutsumikomu Yō ni..." (つつみ込むように…; "Like Being All Wrapped Up")	2010	78	30		Request
"Mō Koi Nante Shinai" (もう恋なんてしない; "I'll No Longer Do Things Like Love")	2011	— (Note: Charted at number 99 on the Hot Top Airplay chart.)	20		We Love Mackey
"Take Five"	2013	14	—		Delicious: Juju's Jazz 2nd Dish
"Hoshizukiyo" (星月夜; "Night of Moon and Stars")	2013	44	—		Door
"Anniversary"	2014	70	—		Request II
"Ito" (糸; "Thread")	2014	100	—		Request II
"Yumemiru Chanson Ningyō" (夢みるシャンソン人形; "Dreaming Chanson Doll")	2015	—	—		"What You Want" (single)
"Viva la Vida" (Note: Originally recorded on the "Door" / "Hot Stuff" single in 2014.)	2016	— (Note: Charted at number 45 on the Radio Songs sub-chart.)	—		Timeless
"—" denotes items that did not chart or were released before the creation of the Billboard Japan Hot 100.

=== Other charted songs ===
List of other songs with selected chart positions
Title	Year	Peak chart positions		Album
Title	Year	JPN RIAJ monthly ringtones (Note: The RIAJ "Reco-kyō" monthly ringtone chart is a depreciated chart that ran from 2006 until 2009.)	JPN RIAJ Digital Track Chart	Album
"What's Love?"	2009	25	—	What's Love?
"Soba ni Ite" (そばにいて; "Come to My Side")	2010	—	7	Juju
"First Love"	2010	—	5	Request
"Time Goes By"	2010	—	24	Request
"Will"	2010	—	76	Request
"Gips" (ギブス, Gibusu; "Orthopedic cast")	2010	—	98	Request
"Kotoba ni Dekinai" (言葉にできない; "Unable to Put It into Words")	2010	—	99	"Kono Yoru o Tomete yo" (single)
"Love Again"	2011	—	4	"Mata Ashita..." (single) / You
"Hana ga Meguru Tokoro e" (花がめぐるところへ; "To Where There Are Flowers All Around")	2012	—	14	"Tadaima" (single)
"—" denotes items that did not chart.

== Other appearances ==
List of non-studio album or guest appearances that feature Juju
Title	Year	Album
"Sex Friend" (セックスフレンド, Sekkusu Furendo) (K Dub Shine featuring Juju)	2001	Save the Children
"Meaning of Life" (DJ Masterkey featuring Hi-Timez + Juju)	2001	Daddy's House Vol. 1
"First and Last" (DJ Hiro featuring Juju)	2002	Harlem Recordings Presents Harlem Ver. 1.0
"Family (Is One of Nature's Masterplaces)"	2002	Kyōki no Sakura Original Soundtrack
"I Confess"	2002	Kyōki no Sakura Original Soundtrack
"Kako no Nai Mirai" (過去のない未来; "Pastless Future")	2002	Kyōki no Sakura Original Soundtrack
"Hi-Timez" (Hi-Timez and Juju)	2002	Change the Game
"First and Last (String of Love Mix)" (DJ Hiro featuring Juju)	2002	Harlem Recordings Presents Harlem Ver. 1.7
"Thru" (A Kid Called Roots featuring Juju)	2003	Harlem Recordings Presents Harlem Ver. 2.0
"Horoscope Love" (Chris featuring Juju)	2003	Love Me or Not
"Free Your Mind" (DJ Masterkey featuring Juju)	2003	Daddy's House Vol. 2
"Come, Fly with Me"	2005	Jam Films S Original Soundtrack
"How You Feel" (Hi-Timez featuring Juju)	2005	Goo Goo Hoo
"Sakura Saku Koro" (桜咲く頃; "When Cherry Blossoms Bloom") (One Draft featuring Juju)	2007	"Furusato" (single)
"Another Day" (Bliss featuring Juju)	2007	Tokyo Calling 2
"Go My Way" (Nobodyknows featuring Juju)	2007	Vulgarhythm
"Best Friends" (Dohzi-T featuring Mummy-D, Juju)	2007	One Mic
"The Power of Love"	2007	Tribute to Celine Dion
"Corcovado"	2007	Jobiniana: Ai to Hohoemi to Hana
"Live! Together (Tokyo Girls Anthem)" (Delta Goodrem and Juju)	2008	Delta(Japanese Deluxe Edition)
"Funtime" (Pax Japonica Groove featuring Juju)	2008	Pax Japonica Groove
"In-Mail ('08 Ver.)" (Dohzi-T featuring Juju)	2008	12 Love Stories
"Yume no Tsuzuki" (ユメノツヅキ; "The Next Part of the Dream") (Jazztronik featuring Juju)	2008	JTK
"Now, and Now" (I-Dep featuring Juju)	2009	Pop Out!! What!!!
"Is It Over?" (Toshinobu Kubota featuring Juju)	2010	Timeless Fly
"My Favorite Things" (Juju featuring Toku)	2014	Kids Jazz CD
"Suki" (すき; "Like")	2014	Watashi to Dorikamu: Dreams Come True 25th Best Covers
"Yuki no Christmas" (雪のクリスマス; "Christmas Snow")	2015	Watashi to Drecom 2 -Drecom Wonderland 2015 Kaisai Kinen Best Covers-
"Will"	2016	MIKA NAKASHIMA TRIBUTE
"Waraereba" (笑えれば; "If you can laugh")	2017	Ulfuls Tribute ~Best of Girl Friends~
"Yasashisa de Afureru You ni" (やさしさで溢れるように; "Like Overflowing with Kindness")	2020	Sing for One ~Minna to Tsunagaru. Ashita e Tsunagaru.~

== Video albums ==
List of media, with selected chart positions
Title	Album details	Peak positions	
Title	Album details	JPN DVD	JPN Blu-ray
Juju 10.10.10 Special Live Request	Released: December 22, 2010 (JPN); Label: Sony; Formats: DVD	45	—
2011.10.10 Special Live at Blue Note Tokyo	Released: December 21, 2011 (JPN); Label: Sony; Formats: DVD, Blu-ray	170	84
MTV Unplugged Juju	Released: August 1, 2012 (JPN); Label: Sony; Formats: DVD, Blu-ray	34	30
Juju-en Zenkoku Tour 2012 at Nippon Budōkan (ジュジュ苑全国ツアー2012 at 日本武道館; "Juju Garden Tour 2012 at Nippon Budokan")	Released: February 6, 2013 (JPN); Label: Sony; Formats: DVD, Blu-ray	22	20
Juju Best Story Arena Tour 2013	Released: September 25, 2013 (JPN); Label: Sony; Formats: DVD, Blu-ray	51	66
JUJU SUPER LIVE 2014 - JUJU-En 10th Anniversary Special- at SAITAMA SUPER ARENA	Released: March 11, 2015 (JPN); Label: Sony; Formats: DVD, Blu-ray	29	31
JUJU BEST MUSIC CLIPS	Released: March 25, 2015 (JPN); Label: Sony; Formats: DVD, Blu-ray	50	55
-JUJU En Special- Snack JuJu at Kokuritsu Yoyogi Kyougijou Daiichi Taiikukan (-ジュジュ苑スペシャル- スナックJUJU at 国立代々木競技場 第一体育館; "-JUJU En Special- Snack JuJu at Yoyogi National Gymnasium No. 1 Gymnasium")	Released: March 22, 2017 (JPN); Label: Sony; Formats: DVD, Blu-ray	23	50
