= Your Story =

Your Story may refer to:

== Music ==
=== Albums ===
- Your Story (album), a 2006 album by Brown Eyed Girls
- Your Story, 2012 album by George Mraz and David Hazeltine and Jason Brown
- Your Story, 2020 compilation album by Juju; see Juju discography

=== Songs ===
- "Your Story", 1980 tune written by Bill Evens; see list of compositions by Bill Evans
- "Your Story", 2000 song by Kim Jang-hoon from the album Innocence
- "Your Story" (Japanese: キミモノガタ, Kimi Monogatari), 2008 song by Little by Little
- "Your Story", 2012 song by Kim Hyun-joong off the album Unlimited
- "Your Story", 2013 song by Joe Hertler & The Rainbow Seekers off the record The Russell Sessions
- "Kwento Mo (Your Story)", 2013 song by Gloc-9 off the album Liham at Lihim
- "Your Story", 2017 B-side by Bernard Park off the single "Blame"
- "Your Story", 2019 single by Chipmunk; see Chip discography

== Other uses ==
- Your Story, 2013 film by director Tolga Örnek
- Dragon Quest: Your Story, 2019 animated Japanese film
- Yōkoso, Wagaya e (Japanese: ようこそ、わが家へ, Your Story), Japanese dramatic TV mystery show; based on the eponymous novel by Jun Ikeido
- Yōkoso, Wagaya e (Japanese: ようこそ、わが家へ, Your Story), mystery novel by Jun Ikeido, basis of the eponymous TV show Yōkoso, Wagaya e
- Your Story (Japanese: 君の話), science fiction novel by Sugaru Miaki (三秋縋); see Lethe
- La tua storia (Italian: Your story), the motto of Radiotelevisione svizzera (RTSI), Swiss broadcaster

== See also ==
- Your Story Theatre, U.S. dramatic anthology TV show
