= Junya Yamaguchi =

Japanese musician

Junya Yamaguchi(JUNY MAG)
- Origin: Japan
- Occupations: Musician, keyboardist, pianist, composer, arranger, music producer
- Instrument: Keyboard
- Website: www.junyayamaguchi.com

Junya Yamaguchi (Producer name Juny Mag)山口潤也 is a Japanese keyboard player, pianist, composer, arranger and music producer based in Los Angeles and New York.

== Background ==
Junya Yamaguchi (producer name JUNY MAG) is a Japanese composer, producer, arranger and keyboardist based in Los Angeles. He started his life as a musician from age of ten. He won several YAMAHA Electone competitions with his own arrangement and composition in his teens. From 2004, he formed his own band called ULANORI, which released two albums in 2007 and 2008. Then he moved to New York City in the end of 2008. In NYC, Junya has worked with various musicians and producers. From 2011 Junya became main keyboardist of Andy Suzuki & The Method, played at Artpark 2014 opening for Ringo Starr (Beatles), with Andy Suzuki & The Method. In 2014, at the Metlife Stadium in NJ, he performed "America The Beautiful"with Queen Latifah. at the opening ceremony of Super Bowl 2014.

Junya moved to Los Angeles in 2014 then he started working as a music producer "Juny Mag". He has been working for Andy Suzuki and The Method, Brian Soko, Murder Beats, Rasool Diaz, Aluna George, Unique Zayas, Omylrd and so on.

== Discography ==
Year	Title	Album	Peak chart position	Artist	Information
2019	Own Yourself	—	—	OMYLRD	—
2019	1. tryna 2. Redondo 3. Burnt 4. bigwig 5. Wasting Your Breath 6. Electric Banana 7. Vector 8. THE WAY OUT 9. little dancer 10. Aphelion	RE CATALOGUE	—	JUNY MAG	—
2019	1. Medicine 2. Dirty Floors 2 3. Can't Talk 4. Old Lady 5. Let You Win 6. Shame 7. You Give Me 8. Sinner 9. Thelma Louise	Alibi	—	Andy Suzuki & The Method	—
2018	Crush On You	RIRI	oriconWeekly Album Chart 34th Billboard JapanWeekly Album Chart 18th	RIRI	Co-Producer Brian Soko
2018	Mood	—	—	Unique Zayas	—
2018	FWU	—	—	Unique Zayas	—
2017	1. Runaway 2. I Can't Live 3. Shelter 4. Fire 5. Mama Told Me 6. I Need You More(The More You Leave) 7. Come Forward 8. Overtime 9. Fight 10. Digging My Way Out 11. Forgiven 12. Searching 13. Hold You	The Glass Hour	—	Andy Suzuki & The Method	—
2017	Say You Won't Let Go (COVER)	—	—	Andy Suzuki & The Method	—
2017	Fast Car (COVER)	—	—	Andy Suzuki & The Method	—
2017	I'm For You	—	—	Unique Zayas	—
2017	Twise	Nebraska Jones Experiment EP	—	Jessie Davis	—
2017	Aini	—	—	Persica	—
2017	potopoto	—	—	Persica	—
2017	Let Me Cry	—	—	Jamiila	—
2017	Put Your Phone Away	—	—	Jamiila	—
2016	One	—	—	Persica	—
2016	Flappter	—	—	Juny Mag featuring Kappa Tanabe	—
2016	In My Head	—	—	Juny Mag	—
2015	Synergy	—	—	JANICE UY	—
2015	Falling You	—	—	Madam H	—
2014	1. Diamond dust 2. Crane 3. Take a train 4. Snowflake 5. Sunrise and icicle 6. White Earth 7. Night wind 8. Journey 9. Departure	Okinawa - The healing trip -	—	Junya Yamaguchi	Physical CD only
2014	1. Precious Days 2. walk with life 4. Be You	Be You	—	Persica	Physical CD only
2013	Static	—	—	Estee Maria	—
2013	The Alphabet Song	—	—	Kelly Jones	—
2012	1. Her Ghost 2. Take Care Of Me	The Ghost Stories EP	—	Andy Suzuki & The Method	—
2011	Otagaisama	—	—	Neo Blues Maki	—
2011	Kurage	—	—	Neo Blues Maki	—
2011	Bus Driver	—	—	Neo Blues Maki	—
2011	Party All Night	COLORS	Billboard Japan; Weekly Album Chart 7th Yearly Album Chart 64th oricon Weekly Album Chart 7th Yearly Album Chart 98th	Shota Shimizu	RIAJ Certification: Gold
2011	1. intro 3. dragonfly 7. city girl	Uncertain Midnight		Sound Cyclone	Touhou Project
2011	future	—		NY Deli Music	
2010	Parkour The Art Of Movement	DVD	—	T.O Entertainment	Broadcast on Japanese TV "Zatsugakuou"
2010	round and round	JUJU	oricon: Weekly Album Chart 2nd Yearly Album Chart 62nd	JUJU	The 52nd Japan Record Awards (Excellence Album) RIAJ Certification: Gold
2010	Mr Nice Guy	Rock 'n' Roll Reparations Vol2	—	King Aswad	—
2009	A Strawhat Girl And The Strange House	—	—	Noyama Akira	60 seconds cinema competition Hokuto Award
2008	3. Involved 10. 111/7	Gyakkou	—	Sound Cyclone	Touhou Project
2008	1.Intro 2. UNIVERSE 3. Abyssopelagic 4. Hamburger 5. Stay 6. Good-bye	Symmetry	—	Ulanori	Physical CD only
2007	1.Talking about 2. 86 3. Coffee Shop 4. President	Talking about 86 in the coffee shop for the president	—	Ulanori	Physical CD only
