= Afterlost =

Japanese mobile game and anime series

- AFTERLOST
- Promotional art for the anime

消滅都市 (Shōmetsu Toshi)
- Genre: Thriller
- Video game
- Developer: Wright Flyer Studios
- Publisher: Wright Flyer Studios; GREE
- Platform: Mobile
- Released: May 2014
- Anime television series
- Directed by: Shigeyuki Miya
- Written by: Shingo Irie
- Music by: Kenji Kawai
- Studio: Madhouse
- Licensed by: Crunchyroll (Note: In North America through Crunchyroll, LLC (formerly known as Funimation).)
- Original network: Tokyo MX, ytv, BS11, AT-X
- Original run: April 7, 2019 – June 23, 2019
- Episodes: 12
- icon

Afterlost (Japanese: 消滅都市, Hepburn: Shōmetsu Toshi; transl. "Annihilated City") (stylized as AFTERLOST) is a Japanese mobile game series. An anime television series adaptation by studio Madhouse aired from April to June 2019.

== Plot ==
One day, the city of Lost suddenly disappears. Takuya, a courier who works alone, meets Yuki, a mysterious girl who is the sole survivor of the incident. After receiving a message from Yuki's father, who was presumed missing, they head toward Lost.

Despite not knowing each other, Takuya and Yuki must work together to survive and reach Lost. Opposing them is a mysterious organization who seeks to prevent them from knowing the truth.

== Characters ==
Yuki (ユキ)
Voiced by: Kana Hanazawa (Japanese); Lindsay Seidel (English)
A girl with mysterious powers who is the sole survivor of the incident that destroyed Lost. After receiving a message from her father, she and Takuya head for the city.
Takuya (タクヤ)
Voiced by: Tomokazu Sugita (Japanese); Jason Liebrecht (English)
A man who works as a courier. Although he usually works alone, after meeting Yuki he works with her to reach Lost.
Akira (アキラ)
Voiced by: Yuichi Nakamura (Japanese); Orion Pitts (English)
A man who has been taking care of Yuki and Souma since they were young. He went missing following Lost's destruction.
Soma (ソウマ)
Voiced by: Ayaka Asai (Japanese); Mikaela Krantz (English)
Yuki's younger brother, who went missing following Lost's destruction.
Eiji (エイジ)
Voiced by: Tarusuke Shingaki (Japanese); Kyle Igneczi (English)
A man who tasked Takuya with taking Yuki to Lost. He once worked alongside her father in researching parallel worlds.
Kikyo (キキョウ)
Voiced by: Aimi (Japanese); Caitlin Glass (English)
A researcher.
Geek (ギーク)
Voiced by: Taisuke Nishimura (Japanese); Tyson Rinehart (English)
Takuya's childhood friend, who is a big fan of SPR5.
Yumiko (ユミコ)
Voiced by: Mitsuki Nakae (Japanese); Dawn M. Bennett (English)
A detective and Takuya's colleague.
Kouta (コウタ)
Voiced by: Makoto Takahashi (Japanese); Stephen Fu (English)
A detective and Takuya's colleague.
Homura (ホムラ)
Voiced by: Haruka Shamoto (Japanese); Michelle Rojas (English)
The ace of SPR5, who specializes in dancing and singing.
Nami (ナミ)
Voiced by: Emiri Iwai (Japanese); Kristen McGuire (English)
The leader of SPR5, who once worked as a child actor.
Haruka (ハルカ)
Voiced by: Hina Suguta (Japanese); Amanda Gish (English)
A member of SPR5, who is mostly emotionless.
Rena (レナ)
Voiced by: Aguri Ōnishi (Japanese); Kasi Hollowell (English)
The youngest member of SPR5, who is hardworking.
Yua (ユア)
Voiced by: Hikari Sonoyama (Japanese); Megan Shipman (English)
A member of SPR5; she looks the youngest, but her true age is unknown.
Ryōko (リョウコ)
Voiced by: Tomoyo Kurosawa (Japanese); Mallorie Rodak (English)
The daughter of a detective, who also works as a detective.
Tsubasa (ツバサ)
Voiced by: Nobunaga Shimazaki (Japanese); Alejandro Saab (English)
Yoshiaki's older brother, who one day disappeared and formed the Phantom Thieves.
Yoshiaki (ヨシアキ)
Voiced by: Yoshitsugu Matsuoka (Japanese); Jerry Jewell (English)
A man who works as a magician and is searching for his brother Tsubasa.
Suzuna (スズナ)
Voiced by: Ayane Sakura (Japanese); Brianna Roberts (English)
An agent of a mysterious organization who is pursuing Yuki.
Rui (ルイ)
Voiced by: KENN (Japanese); Howard Wang (English)
A member of the Phantom Thieves; a trickster who uses knives.
Sumire (スミレ)
Voiced by: Natsumi Hioka (Japanese); Macy Anne Johnson (English)
A member of the Phantom Thieves, who wields a chainsaw.
Taiyō (タイヨウ)
Voiced by: Hidenori Takahashi (Japanese); Mike McFarland (English)
The head of Lacuna Chemicals.
Tsuki (ツキ)
Voiced by: Asami Imai (Japanese); Lydia Mackay (English)
A researcher at Lacuna Chemicals.
Yūji (ユウジ)
Voiced by: Ryōta Suzuki (Japanese); Garret Storms (English)
Ryōko's colleague.
Keigo (ケイゴ)
Voiced by: Masaki Terasoma (Japanese); David Wald (English)
A detective.
Syunpei (シュンペイ)
Voiced by: Yoshitaka Yamaya (Japanese); Aaron Roberts (English)
Ryōko's subordinate.
Jack (ジャック)
Voiced by: Atsushi Imaruoka (Japanese); Christopher Guerrero (English)
A member of the Phantom Thieves, who uses bombs.
Kana (カナ)
Voiced by: Yurika Kubo (Japanese); Margaret McDonald (English)
A member of the Phantom Thieves, who specializes in hacking and technology.
Kaibara (カイバラ)
Voiced by: Tesshō Genda (Japanese); Greg Dulcie (English)
The head of the detective agency which Yumiko and Kota work for, who went missing following Lost's destruction.
Daichi (ダイチ)
Voiced by: Kenjiro Tsuda (Japanese); Christopher Wehkamp (English)
Yuki's father, who was researching parallel worlds at a research institute. He was presumed missing following Lost's destruction, but after receiving a message from him, Yuki and Takuya set out towards it.

== Media ==
=== Game ===
Wright Flyer Studios and GREE launched the original mobile game in May 2014, and an update titled Shōmetsu Toshi 2 was released in November 2016. As revealed in the live broadcast held on November 13, 2018, Shōmetsu Toshi 0., the third update to the game, became available for download on the evening of the latest music concert to be held on November 25. A new mobile game, titled Afterlost – Shōmetsu Toshi, was released on June 6, 2019, and shut down on June 30, 2021, after two years in service. An unspecified 3D project powered by Unreal Engine 4 was under development as of 2018.

=== Anime ===
An anime television series adaptation was announced on May 27, 2018. The series was animated by Madhouse, directed by Shigeyuki Miya, and written by Shingo Irie. Tomoyuki Shitaya designed the characters, while Satoshi Motoyama served as the series' sound director. Kenji Kawai composed the series' music, which was produced by Pony Canyon. The series aired from April 7 to June 23, 2019, on Tokyo MX, ytv, BS11, and AT-X. Mao Abe performed the series' opening theme song "Kotae". For the ending theme, Kana Hanazawa performed a cover of "Swallowtail Butterfly ～Ai no Uta～" by Chara for the first two episodes and a cover of "Hello, Again ～Mukashi Kara Aru Basho～" by My Little Lover in episodes 8 and 12, while SPR5 performed "With Your Breath" in episodes 3–7, and then episodes 9–11. The series ran for 12 episodes. The anime was licensed by Funimation, which premiered its SimulDub on April 28, 2019.

No.	Title	Original release date
1	"Lost"; Transliteration: "Shōmetsu" (Japanese: 消滅)	April 7, 2019
2	"Sacrifice"; Transliteration: "Gisei" (Japanese: 犠牲)	April 14, 2019
3	"Memory"; Transliteration: "Kioku" (Japanese: 記憶)	April 21, 2019
4	"Suspicion"; Transliteration: "Giwaku" (Japanese: 疑惑)	April 28, 2019
5	"Affection"; Transliteration: "Jōai" (Japanese: 情愛)	May 5, 2019
6	"Parting Ways"; Transliteration: "Ketsubetsu" (Japanese: 訣別)	May 12, 2019
7	"Regret"; Transliteration: "Kōkai" (Japanese: 後悔)	May 19, 2019
8	"Choice"; Transliteration: "Sentaku" (Japanese: 選択)	May 26, 2019
9	"Fate"; Transliteration: "Unmei" (Japanese: 運命)	June 2, 2019
10	"Decision"; Transliteration: "Ketsudan" (Japanese: 決断)	June 9, 2019
11	"Trust"; Transliteration: "Shinrai" (Japanese: 信頼)	June 16, 2019
12	"Future"; Transliteration: "Mirai" (Japanese: 未来)	June 23, 2019
