= You (Juju album) =

Studio album by Juju
- Released: July 13, 2011
- Recorded: 2011
- Genre: Jazz, R&B, J-pop
- Label: Sony Music Associated Records

Juju chronology
Request (2010)	You (2011)	Delicious (2011)

You is the fourth album released by Juju under label Sony Music Associated Records.

== Track listing ==
CD
No.	Title	Lyrics	Music	Arranger(s)	Length
1.	"Kono Yoru wo Tomete yo (この夜を止めてよ)"	Kiyoshi Matsuo	Toshiaki Matsumoto	Jin Nakamura	4:54
2.	"Sayonara no Kawari ni (さよならの代わりに, Instead of a Goodbye)"	Natsumi Kobayashi	Jeff Miyahara, Yuichi Hayashida	Jeff Miyahara, Yuichi Hayashida	5:13
3.	"Tsuyogari (つよがり)"	Yoichiro Takagi	Yoichiro Takagi, Seiji Kameda	Seiji Kameda	5:01
4.	"If"	Satoko Aida	Atsushi Kimura	Masanori Shimada	4:16
5.	"Negai (願い)"	Yumi Iwaki	Atsushi Kimura, Taisho	Masanori Shimada	4:31
6.	"Voice"	H.U.B	Daisuke Kawaguchi	Yuta Nakano (arrangement and strings arrangement)	5:01
7.	"Love Again"	JUJU, Jeff Miyahara, Yuichi Hayashida	Jeff Miyahara, Yuichi Hayashida	Yuichi Hayashida	4:15
8.	"Memories"	Satomi	Jin Nakamura	Jin Nakamura	4:03
9.	"Pieces Of Our Days"	E-3	E-3, DJ HIROnyc	E-3, Soushi Uchida, DJ HIROnyc	5:02
10.	"Trust In You"	JUJU, Sho Watanabe, JUN-T	Sho Watanabe	UTA	3:53
11.	"Mata Ashita... (また明日..., See You Tomorrow...)"	Emi Makiho	Kouta Okochi	Seiji Kameda	5:35
12.	"Antique"	Kiyosaku Uezu	Kiyosaku Uezu	Akihisa Matsuura	7:13
13.	"You"	Emi Makiho	Kaoruko Otake	Masanori Shimada	6:00
