= Hello, Again (Mukashi kara Aru Basho) =

1995 single by My Little Lover

"Hello, Again ～昔からある場所～"

Single by My Little Lover

from the album Evergreen
- Language: Japanese
- English title: Hello, Again (Mukashi kara Aru Basho)
- Released: August 21, 1995
- Genre: J-pop
- Length: 5:14
- Label: Toy's Factory
- Songwriters: Kate, Kenji Fujii, Takeshi Kobayashi
- Producers: My Little Lover, Kobayashi

My Little Lover singles chronology
"Shiroi Kite" (1995)	"Hello, Again ～昔からある場所～" (1995)	"Alice" (1996)

Music video
- 「Hello, Again 〜昔からある場所〜」Music Video on YouTube

"Hello, Again (Mukashi kara Aru Basho)" (Hello, Again ～昔からある場所～; lit. "A Place That's Been There for Ages") is a song by Japanese band My Little Lover. It was released as a single on August 21, 1995, and is currently the band's biggest hit single.

== Promotion ==
The song was used as the theme song for the Japanese drama Owaranai Natsu, starring Asaka Seto, Ryuichi Ohura, and LaSalle Ishii.

== Versions ==
In My Little Lover's discography, "Hello, Again (Mukashi kara Aru Basho)" has been recorded in studio three times: the original, the acoustic version on Organic (2002) and the differently arranged acoustic version on Acoakko (2008). The original appears on the single, Evergreen (1995), Singles (2001) and the greatest hits disc of Akko (2006).

== Track listing ==
No.	Title	Writer(s)	Arranger	Length
1.	"Hello, Again (Mukashi kara Aru Basho)"	Kate, Kenji Fujii, Takeshi Kobayashi	Kobayashi, My Little Lover	5:15
2.	"Delicacy"	Kate, Fujii	Kobayashi, My Little Lover	5:46
3.	"Hello, Again (Mukashi kara Aru Basho) (Instrumental Version)"	Kate, Fujii, Kobayashi	Kobayashi, My Little Lover	5:11
Total length:				16:11

== Chart rankings ==
Chart (1995)	Peak position
Oricon weekly singles	1
Oricon yearly singles	6
Chart (2010)	Peak position
RIAJ Digital Track Chart Top 100	16

=== Certifications and sales ===
Certifier	Amount
Oricon physical sales	1,850,000
RIAJ physical shipping certification	1,000,000+

== Juju version ==
"Hello, Again (Mukashi kara Aru Basho)"

Single by Juju

from the album Request
- Released: June 23, 2010
- Genre: J-pop
- Length: 5:12
- Label: Sony
- Songwriters: Kate, Kenji Fujii, Takeshi Kobayashi
- Producer: Akihisa Matsuura

Juju singles chronology
"Trust in You" (2010)	"Hello, Again (Mukashi kara Aru Basho)" (2010)	"Kono Yoru o Tomete yo" (2010)

Hello, Again (Mukashi kara Aru Basho) was covered by Japanese R&B singer Juju in 2010, used in commercials for the Sony Alpha digital camera. The cover was very popular, reaching #1 on RIAJ's Digital Track Chart, causing the original to chart again and prompted Juju to release a cover album of female Japanese vocalists' songs, Request.

=== Track listing ===
All tracks arranged by Akihisa Matsuura.

No.	Title	Length
1.	"Hello, Again (Mukashi kara Aru Basho) (Straight Cover)"	5:12
2.	"Hello, Again (Mukashi kara Aru Basho) (Ballad Ver.)"	5:46
3.	"Hello, Again (Mukashi kara Aru Basho) (Straight Cover) (Instrumental)"	5:12
4.	"Hello, Again (Mukashi kara Aru Basho) (Ballad Ver.) (Instrumental)"	5:16
Total length:		16:11

=== Chart rankings ===
Weekly chart performance for Juju version
Chart (2010)	Peak position
Billboard Adult Contemporary Airplay	13
Billboard Japan Hot 100	19
Oricon weekly singles	15
RIAJ Digital Track Chart weekly top 100	1
RIAJ Digital Track Chart weekly top 100: Ballad Version	23
RIAJ Digital Track Chart yearly top 100	15

Annual chart rankings for Juju version
Chart (2010)	Peak position
Japan Adult Contemporary (Billboard)	84

==== Certifications and sales ====
Chart	Amount
Oricon physical sales	23,000
RIAJ ringtone downloads	Double platinum (500,000+)
RIAJ full-length cellphone downloads	Double platinum (500,000+)

=== Release history ===
Region	Date	Format
Japan	June 16, 2010	Ringtone
Japan	June 23, 2010	Cellphone download
Japan	July 14, 2010	Ringtone (Ballad Ver.)
Japan	July 21, 2010	Cellphone download (Ballad Ver.)
Japan	July 28, 2010	CD single, PC download

== Other cover versions ==
- Mi (2008, album I Love Music: Mi Best Collection)
- Runa Miyoshida (2007, album Pure Flavor #1: Color of Love)
- Kana Hanazawa (2019, anime Afterlost)
- Ayaka (2021, video game Tales of Arise)
- Kawamura Ryuichi (2012, album The Voice 2)
