= Request (Juju album) =

Studio album by Juju
- Released: September 29, 2010
- Recorded: 2010
- Genre: J-pop
- Length: 1:01:04
- Label: Sony

Juju chronology
Juju (2010)	Request (2010)	You (2011)

Singles from Request
- 1. "Last Kiss" Released: February 24, 2010; 2. "Hello, Again (Mukashi Kara Aru Basho)" Released: July 28, 2010

Request is a cover album by Japanese recording artist Juju, released on September 29, 2010. The album features recordings of famous songs by Japanese female vocalists, mostly from the late 1990s.

== Conception ==
The album was originally titled Juju Sings Beautiful Woman. After the album's announcement on August 4, a questionnaire was put up on Juju's website, asking fans which songs they wanted to hear Juju cover. Despite this, four songs had already been chosen for the album, "Gips," "Hello, Again (Mukashi Kara Aru Basho)," "Last Kiss" and "Time Goes By."

The album is Juju's second disc of covers, after the She Sings... second disc of her previous album Juju, which featured primarily covers of Western songs in English.

== Promotion ==
"Last Kiss" was originally released in February 2010, as one of the A-side tracks of the four A-side single "Sakura Ame/Ready for Love/S.H.E./Last Kiss."

A cover of My Little Lover's "Hello, Again (Mukashi Kara Aru Basho)" sung by Juju was announced as a song used in an adverstising campaign for the Sony Alpha digital camera on June 4. The song was released digitally on June 16 as a ringtone and on June 23 as a full-length cellphone download, where it was extremely successful digitally, reaching #1 on the RIAJ Digital Track Chart. Due to this popularity, it was released as a physical single a month later, where it reached #15 on Oricon's physical charts.

== Track listing ==
No.	Title	Lyrics	Music	Arranger(s)	Length
1.	"Hello, Again (Mukashi Kara Aru Basho)" (My Little Lover cover)	KATE (Takeshi Kobayashi)	Kenji Fujii, Takeshi Kobayashi	Akihisa Matsuura	5:15
2.	"Tsutsumikomu Yō ni..." (Misia cover)	Satoshi Shimano	S. Shimano	Chokkaku	5:15
3.	"Time Goes By" (Every Little Thing cover)	Mitsuru Igarashi	M. Igarashi	Seiji Kameda	5:25
4.	"Gips" (Ringo Shiina cover)	R. Shiina	R. Shiina	Masanori Shimada	5:38
5.	"There Will Be Love There (Ai no Aru Basho)" (The Brilliant Green cover)	Tomoko Kawase	Shunsaku Okuda	Masayuki Sakamoto	4:36
6.	"Don't Wanna Cry" (Namie Amuro cover)	Takahiro Maeda	Tetsuya Komuro	Jin Nakamura	5:35
7.	"Lover Soul" (Judy and Mary cover)	Yuki	Takuya	Seiji Kameda	4:12
8.	"White Love" (Speed cover)	Hiromasa Ijichi	H. Ijichi	Hiroshi Nakamura	6:54
9.	"Suki" (Dreams Come True cover)	Miwa Yoshida	M. Yoshida	Akihisa Matsuura	3:41
10.	"Will" (Mika Nakashima cover)	Yasushi Akimoto	Daisuke Kawaguchi	Satoshi Takebe	5:43
11.	"Last Kiss" (Bonnie Pink cover)	Bonnie Pink	Bonnie Pink	Seiji Kameda	4:23
12.	"First Love" (Hikaru Utada cover)	H. Utada	H. Utada	Akihisa Matsuura	4:27
Total length:					1:01:04

== Chart rankings ==
Chart (2010)	Peak position
Oricon daily albums	1
Oricon weekly albums	1
Oricon yearly album chart	13

=== Reported sales and certifications ===
Chart	Amount
Oricon physical sales	469,000
RIAJ shipping certification	Double platinum (500,000+)

=== Promotional tracks ===
Many songs from the album were released prior to the physical release digitally, or through other means such as a physical CD or radio airplay.

Date	Title	Format	Chart positions			Oricon sales
Date	Title	Format	Oricon Singles Charts	Billboard Japan Hot 100	RIAJ digital tracks	Oricon sales
February 24, 2010	"Last Kiss"	CD single, digital download	20	—	—	7,700
June 16, 2010	"Hello, Again (Mukashi Kara Aru Basho)"	Ringtone	15	19	1; 23*	23,000
June 23, 2010	"Hello, Again (Mukashi Kara Aru Basho)"	Full-length cellphone download	15	19	1; 23*	23,000
July 14, 2010	"Hello, Again (Mukashi Kara Aru Basho)"	Ringtone (Ballad Ver.)	15	19	1; 23*	23,000
July 21, 2010	"Hello, Again (Mukashi Kara Aru Basho)"	Full-length cellphone download (Ballad Ver.)	15	19	1; 23*	23,000
July 28, 2010	"Hello, Again (Mukashi Kara Aru Basho)"	CD single, PC download	15	19	1; 23*	23,000
September 8, 2010	"First Love"	Ringtone	—	—	5	—
September 15, 2010	"First Love"	Full-length cellphone download	—	—	5	—
September 15, 2010	"Tsutsumikomu Yō ni..."	Ringtone	—	78	30	—
September 20, 2010	"Time Goes By"	Ringtone	—	—	25	—
September 22, 2010	"There Will Be Love There (Ai no Aru Basho)"	Ringtone	—	43	21	—
September 26, 2010	"Will"	Ringtone	—	—	76	—
September 29, 2010	"Gips"	Ringtone	—	—	98	—

*Ballad Version

== Release history ==
Region	Date	Format
Japan	September 29, 2010	CD, digital download
Taiwan	October 1, 2010	CD
Hong Kong	October 5, 2010	CD
Japan	October 16, 2010	Rental CD
