= Kono Yoru o Tomete yo =

Single by Juju
- Released: November 17, 2010
- Recorded: Orchelabo Tokyo (vocals) (2010); Avaco Creative Studio (strings) (2010)
- Genre: J-pop, contemporary R&B
- Length: 4:53
- Label: Sony Music Entertainment Japan
- Songwriters: Kiyoshi "KC" Matsuo, Toshiaki Matsumoto
- Producers: Jin Nakamura, Matsuo

Juju singles chronology
"Hello, Again (Mukashi Kara Aru Basho)" (2010)	"Kono Yoru o Tomete yo" (2010)	"Sayonara no Kawari ni/Negai" (2011)

"Kono Yoru o Tomete yo" (この夜を止めてよ; "Stop This Night") is a song by Japanese pop, R&B and jazz musician Juju. It was used as the theme song of the Miho Kanno and Hiroshi Tamaki starring drama Guilty: Akuma to Keiyaku Shita Onna(ギルティ 悪魔と契約した女 ), and was released on November 17, 2010.

The song was commercially successful, receiving a triple platinum certification for ringtones, a double platinum certification for full-length cellphone downloads, and a gold certification for physical shipping. According to the RIAJ, the song was the 14th most downloaded song of 2010 and Juju's best performing song of the year, narrowly out-competing her previous single, "Hello, Again (Mukashi Kara Aru Basho)."

== Composition and production ==
The song is a pop ballad, with an instrument arrangement centering on piano, synthesised percussion sounds, and chime instruments, with a background string section. Much of the chorus instrumentalization is based around a short motif, which is repeated in several instruments. The lyrics of the song center on someone reflecting on an ending relationship. The song's protagonist, after she met her lover, started to that being hurt was what love was. The couple shared more secrets together, but she noticed that they had become to go down separate roads. She believes that her lover "saying 'I love you' is sadder than saying 'goodbye'," so asks her lover to stop the night they are spending together, to end their relationship in only five seconds, and after that, for him to forget her. The protagonist admits to wanting to "dream the same colored dreams" as her lover and that she does not regret her past, but she also does not want to cling to a known future. She also believes that she had no say in the moments when she and her lover met, and will part.

According to Juju, the song expresses "lurking strength while in pain," and has a message that "in situations beyond your control, you have to stay strong, no matter what happens," and believes the lyrics are about the feelings of "being confused and in pain." Juju explained the title of the song as relating to the point in a relationship where "you don't want a happy ending, and there is no future, where you want to stop spending time together, immediately." During recording and performances of the song, Juju felt it easy to imagine the feelings of the song's protagonist. Her favorite section of the song is the bridge (the section beginning with the lyrics amai kako no kioku nante).

The song was chosen for release during the search for songs that felt suitable for television dramas for Juju's next studio album. When Juju encountered the music for this song, she attempted humming it, and felt it was the most appropriate song for a drama.

== Promotion ==
During the initial press release for the song, much of the promotional focus was on the song's status as the theme song for the drama Guilty: Akuma to Keiyaku Shita Onna, as well as the songwriters involved: Kiyoshi "KC" Matsuo, who was famous for writing the lyrics to R&B singer Misia's song "Everything," and Jin Nakamura, for his work with dance/R&B group Exile.

On October 10, 2010, Juju held her third annual Juju no Hi (JUJUの日; "Juju Day") live to 5,000 people, at which she performed "Kono Yoru o Tomete yo" for the first time, as well as performing her cover of Off Course's "Kotoba ni Dekinai" in a duet with band member and author of the song, Kazumasa Oda. Further performances of the song include during her set at the Marunouchi Bright Christmas 2010 tree lighting ceremony on November 11 to 2,000 spectators, television performances on Music Japan (October 31), Wednesday J-Pop (November 17), Music Station (November 26) and both CDTV and Music Fair on November 27. "Kono Yoru o Tomete yo" was one of the songs performed for an episode of MTV Japan's Jammed, in which Juju held a surprise performance at an inter-school cultural exchange club meeting for middle school students in Hida, Gifu.

A Twitter-based social networking campaign, called itakoi.com (痛恋.com; "painfulove.com"), was set up for the release of the song, in which people were encouraged to tweet about painful love experiences, similar to the lyrics of the song, with the hash tag #itakoi.

One of the B-sides of the single, "Piece of Our Days," was used as the ending theme song for the Fuji Television program World Business Satellite.

== Music video ==
Top: fashion model Kana against the relationship posters in a subway Bottom: Juju as she performs the song in the music video

The music video was directed by Shinji Niwa, and features dramatic scenes with model Kana (伽奈) and actor Terunosuke Takezai, which are interspersed with scenes of Juju performing the song. The drama scenes begin with Kana's character receiving a phone call outside at night time from Takezai's character, telling her he is sorry. Kana's character walks through an underground train station, and sees many posters of her and her former boyfriend on one of the walls. She slowly walks past the photos that depict happier times in their relationship. Kana's character begins to run until she gets outside, where a screen is showing home videos of her together with her former lover. She sits down, and begins to cry. The scenes of Juju feature constant close-up shots of her against a darkened background, as she performs the song in winter clothing. As she does this, the lighting constantly changes and flares behind her.

The video was first aired during morning news show Mezamashi Terebi, on November 5, 2010.

== Critical reception ==
The reviewer at CDJournal described the song as "a ballad of gratitude that strikes pain into your heart, filled with emotion to the point of pain." Haruna Takekawa of Hot Express called the song a mellow ballad with "dazzling introduction from piano, with magnificent strings, heart-filled bass drums and lyrics that account a painful adult passion," that was on par with the world of lyricist Kiyoshi Matsuo's other works. She felt the song "in a single moment vividly paints a sad love story, when the instruments mix with [Juju's] depth-filled, emotional and peaceful voice." Mikio Yanagisawa of What's In? described Juju's singing as "full and real," and described the song as being "the rolling up of a smooth tapestry created from piano and strings."

== Chart reception ==
The single was a very long charting release on Oricon's physical singles charts, debuting at number 13 for two weeks, and staying in the top 20 for eight weeks; peaking at number 10 for two non-consecutive weeks. It was a massive hit digitally, debuting at number one on RIAJ's Digital Track Chart, dropping to number two for its second week. It then regained its position at number one for two more weeks. Despite only being released for sale for 28 days, the song became the 14th most downloaded song to cellphones for 2010, narrowly beating Juju's previous single, "Hello, Again (Mukashi Kara Aru Basho)."

The B-side "Kotoba ni Dekinai" saw minor success, charting at number 99 on RIAJ's digital chart for a single week.

== Track listing ==
No.	Title	Writer(s)	Arranger	Length
1.	"Kono Yoru o Tomete yo"	Kiyoshi "KC" Matsuo, Toshiaki Matsumoto	Jin Nakamura	4:53
2.	"Piece of Our Days"	E-3, DJ Hironyc	E-3, Soushi Uchida, DJ Hironyc	5:00
3.	"Kotoba ni Dekinai" (言葉にできない "I Can't Put It Into Words," Off Course cover)	Kazumasa Oda	Akihisa Matzura	5:04
4.	"Kono Yoru o Tomete yo (Instrumental)"	Matsuo, Matsumoto	Nakamura	4:53
Total length:				19:50

== Chart rankings ==
"Kono Yoru o Tomete yo"
A sample from "Kono Yoru o Tomete yo," featuring a chorus and an instrumental section of the motif.

Chart	Peak position
Billboard Adult Contemporary Airplay	14
Billboard Japan Hot 100	12
Oricon daily singles	6
Oricon weekly singles	10
RIAJ Digital Track Chart weekly top 100	1
RIAJ Digital Track Chart yearly top 100	14

=== Sales and certifications ===
Chart	Amount
Oricon physical sales	80,000
RIAJ physical shipping certification	Gold (100,000+)
RIAJ ringtone download certification	Triple platinum (750,000+)
RIAJ full-length cellphone download certification	Double platinum (500,000+)
RIAJ streaming	Gold (50,000,000)

== Personnel ==
- Gen Ittetsu Strings - string section
- Juju - vocals
- Toshiaki Matsumoto - music
- Kiyoshi "KC" Matsuo - lyrics, production
- Jin Nakamura - all instruments, arrangement, programming
- Shinsaku Takane - vocal recording, at Orchelabo Tokyo
- Hiromichi "Tucky" Takiguchi - mastering, at Parasight Mastering
- Shojiro Watanabe - string section recording, mixing, at Onkio Haus

== Release history ==
Region	Date	Format
Japan	November 3, 2010	Ringtone
Japan	November 17, 2010	CD single, cellphone download
Japan	December 4, 2010	Rental CD
