= What's Love? =

Studio album by Juju
- Released: March 4, 2009
- Recorded: 2008–2009
- Genre: Jazz, R&B
- Label: Sony Music Associated Records

Juju chronology
My Life (2008)	What's Love? (2009)	Juju (2010)

What's Love? is the second album released by Juju under label Sony Music Associated Records.

== Track listing ==
CD
No.	Title	Lyrics	Music	Arranger(s)	Length
1.	"What’s Love?"	JUJU, Jeff Miyahara	JUJU, Jeff Miyahara, RYLL	Jeff Miyahara, RYLL	4:58
2.	"Sunao ni Naretara (素直になれたら, Being Straightforward)" (JUJU feat.Spontania)	JUJU, Spontania, Jeff Miyahara	JUJU, Spontania, Jeff Miyahara, RYLL		4:49
3.	"U Got Me"	JUJU	JUJU, DJ HIROnyc		4:06
4.	"Missin’ U"	E-3	E-3	E-3, DJ HIROnyc	5:02
5.	"My Life"	E-3	E-3	E-3, DJ HIROnyc horn arrangement: Tak Kuroda	4:34
6.	"I can be free" (album version)	JUJU, her0ism	HALIFANIE	Seiji Kameda	4:44
7.	"Sakura"	E-3	E-3	Instrument arrangement: E-3	5:14
8.	"Sora (空, Sky)"	Katsuhiko Yamamoto, Aoi Kawashima	Katsuhiko Yamamoto	Akihisa Matsuura	6:56
9.	"Love Together"	Kiyoshi Matsuo	Kiyoshi Matsuo, Yoshihiro Toyoshima	MAESTRO-T	5:30
10.	"Kimi ga iru kara (君がいるから) -My Best Friends-"	JUJU	Satomi Kawasaki	Shin Kono	6:11
11.	"Sekai ga Owaru Mae ni (世界が終わる前に)"	Hiroshi Nakamura, Yujiro Hiratsuka	Hiroshi Nakamura	Hiroshi Nakamura, Naoyuki Honzawa	5:31
12.	"Yasashisa de Afureru You ni (やさしさで溢れるように, Filled with Kindness)"	Shinko Ogura, Seiji Kameda	Shinko Ogura	Seiji Kameda	4:51
13.	"Itoshii (愛しい)" (JUJU + Kiyosaku (Mongol800))	Kiyosaku Uezu	Kiyosaku Uezu	Kiyosaku Uezu	6:06
14.	"Donnani Tōkutemo... (どんなに遠くても...)"	JUN.T	Daisuke Kawaguchi	Chokkaku	4:38

== Charts ==
Oricon Sales Chart (Japan)

Release	Chart	Peak position	Debut sales	Sales total
March 4, 2009	Oricon Daily Charts	1		254,700
March 4, 2009	Oricon Weekly Charts	3	60,706	254,700
March 4, 2009	Oricon Monthly Charts	4	146,239	254,700
March 4, 2009	Oricon Yearly Charts	23	254,683	254,700
