= Juju (Juju album) =

Studio album by Juju
- Released: March 17, 2010
- Genre: J-pop
- Label: Sony Music Associated Records

Juju chronology
What's Love? (2009)	Juju (2010)	Request (2010)

Juju is the third album by Japanese singer Juju, released on March 17, 2010.

== Track listing ==
=== Disc one ===
1. "GIRLS NEVER GIVE UP"
- Words by JUJU
- Music by SKY BEATZ & Takuya Harada
- Arranged by SKY BEATZ
2. ""Sakura Ame" (桜雨)"

Words by Kiyoshi Matsuo. Music by Jin Nakamura

3. "Ashita Ga Kurunara 明日がくるなら" / JUJU with Jay'ed
- Words by JUJU, Jay'ed, Jeff Miyahara
- Music by JUJU, Jay'ed, Jeff Miyahara, RYLL & couco
- Arranged by Jeff Miyahara & RYLL
3. "round & round"
- Words by JUJU
- Music by DJ HIROnyc & JUJU
- Produced and Arranged by DJ HIROnyc
- Bass and Guitar by Takahiro Sokusai
- Piano by Junya Yamaguchi
4. "37°C"
- Words by BONNIE PINK
- Music by Joleen Belle, Joachim Svare, Carsten Lindberg Hansen & Charlene Carmon
- Produced and Arranged by Great Dane
5. "Itsukaraka Zutto いつからか...ずっと"
- Words by PESRIP SLYME
- Music by HALEFANIE
- Arranged by Seiji Kameda
6. "Sobaniite そばにいて"
- Words by Ami
- Music by Ayumi Miyazaki
- Arranged by Shinichiro Murayama
7. "I never knew 〜もしも時間がもどせるなら〜"
- Words by JUJU
- Music and Arranged by Mats Lie Skare (Warner/Chapell Music Scandinavia)
8. "S.H.E."
- Words by Mai Osanai
- Music by SOAR
- Arranged by URU
9. "Ga-bera no Hana ガーベラの花"
- Words and Music by Daisuke Kawagchi
- Arranged by CHOKKAKU
10. "READY FOR LOVE"
- Words and Music by JUJU & Jeff Miyahara
- Arranged by Jeff Miyahara, Pochi
11. "Hontouha ほんとうは" feat.MONCH(Ramwire)
- Words by JUJU & MONCH(RamWire)
- Music by Joleen Belle, Joachim Svare, Carsten Lindberg Hansen & Robyn Johnson
- Arranged by Great Dane
12. "bouquet"
- Words and Music by Kiyosaku Uezu (MONGOL800)
- Arranged by Masato Ishinari
13. "Yorunohate 夜の果て"
- Words by JUJU
- Music and Arranged by E-3
14. "Take Me Higher"
- Words by JUJU
- Music by Youji Noi
- Arranged by Alec Shantzis
15. "PRESENT"
- Words by usewax (RamWire)
- Music by RYLL (RamWire) & usewax (RamWire)
- Arranged by RYLL

=== Disc 2 ===
1. LET’S WAIT AWHILE
2. YEARNING FOR YOUR LOVE
3. 奇跡を望むなら... -English version-
4. There Must Be An Angel (Playing With My Heart)
5. I like it
6. New York State Of Mind
7. Something About Us
8. THE POWER OF LOVE
9. LAST CHRISTMAS
10. DON’T KNOW WHY
11. NEVER STOP
12. Saving All My Love For You
13. Street Life
14. The Rose
15. Ex-Factor

== Accolades ==
The album won The Excellence Album Award at the 52nd Japan Record Awards.

== Chart positions ==
- 2nd Oricon Weekly Album Chart (the first week of April 2010)
- 32nd Oricon Top 100 Album first half of the year (2010)
- 62nd Oricon Top 100 Album of the Year (2010)
- The Album kept staying on Oricon Album Chart 54 times
- 1st USEN Request Chart (March 25, 2010)

== Certification ==
Certified as Gold Disk by RIAJ (March 10, 2010)
