= Juju (singer) =

Japanese jazz singer (born 1976)

Juju ジュジュ
- Born: Jun Sonoda (園田 淳); February 14, 1976 (age 50)
- Origin: Shōbara, Hiroshima, Japan
- Genres: J-pop; R&B; jazz
- Occupations: Singer; lyricist; Singer-songwriter
- Instrument: Singing
- Years active: 2001–present
- Label: Sony Music Associated Records
- Website: www.jujunyc.net

Juju (ジュジュ) (born February 14, 1976) is a Japanese jazz and J-Pop singer. She is represented by Sony Music Associated Records.

== Biography ==
She dreamed of being a jazz singer while growing up in Kyoto, and participated in all sorts of music-related activities. At age 18, she left for the US alone. While in New York, she was very taken with the "New York sound," including jazz, R&B, hip-hop, soul, Latin music, and house. Around 2001, Juju began to be featured in a number of works by other artists. In 2002, she provided music for the film Kyōki no Sakura. In 2004, she debuted with her first single "Hikaru no Naka e". The same year, concurrent with her musical activities in New York, she started performing live in Japan. When her third single, "Kiseki o Nozomu nara", was released, it topped the USEN charts and remained on the chart for a record length of 22 weeks. At this point, while she received support from a small group of listeners, she remained mostly unknown. On August 23, 2008, with the release of "Kimi no Subete ni", a collaboration between Spontania and Juju, she broke out onto the Japanese popular music scene, with the single receiving over 2.5 million downloads. Again, on November 26, 2008, another collaboration with Spontania named "Sunao ni Naretara" earned her even more fame, with the song receiving 2.2 million downloads. "Present" is the theme song for the Japanese version of A Christmas Carol. In 2010, Juju released her third album called Juju and it won the Excellence Album Award at the 52nd Japan Record Awards. On November 16, 2020, NHK announced that Juju would take part in the 71st NHK Kōhaku Uta Gassen of New Year's Eve. It was Juju's first time appearing on the show. For her performance, she chose her song "Yasashisa de Afureru You ni" (やさしさで溢れるように; Like It's Overflowing with Kindness). The Japanese version of Passengers (2016 film) uses "Because of You" by her as its theme song. The Japanese version of Soul used a jazz rendition of "Kiseki Wo Nozomu Nara" for the ending theme.

== Discography ==
- Wonderful Life (2007)
- What's Love? (2009)
- Juju (2010)
- Request (2010)
- You (2011)
- Delicious (2011)
- Delicious: Juju's Jazz 2nd Dish (2013)
- Door (2014)
- Request II (2014)
- What You Want (2015)
- Delicious - Juju's Jazz 3rd Dish (2018)
- Your Story (2020)
