= My Little Lover =

Japanese band

- Genres: Pop, rock
- Years active: 1995–present
- Labels: Toy's Factory, Avex Trax, Oorong Records
- Members: Akko
- Past members: Kenji Fujī (1995-2002); Takeshi Kobayashi (1995-2006)
- Website: mylittlelover.net

My Little Lover is a Japanese pop group belonging to the Avex Trax label as of the single "Ribon" (り・ぼん) and the album Akko. Previous releases were under Toy's Factory. The group has had several members, but currently only Akko (Akamatsu Akiko 赤松亜希子) the vocalist, remain.

== History ==
The founding members were Akko (vocals) and Kenji Fujī (藤井謙二, Fujī Kenji) (guitar), later joined by producer/songwriter Takeshi Kobayashi (小林武史, Kobayashi Takeshi) (keyboard) when they released their first album, Evergreen. (The lyricist KATE on their early singles stands for "Kenji, Akko, and Takeshi Ensemble".) Akko and Kobayashi married in 1996, but divorced in 2008 when Kobayashi's affair with Yo Hitoto was made public. Fujii retired from the group in 2002.

In 2008, My Little Lover released a trilogy of singles, "Labyrinth", "Initial" and "A world without sound/The bell of time".

== Discography ==
=== Original albums ===
1. 1995: Evergreen
2. 1998: Presents
3. 1998: New Adventure
4. 1998: The Waters
5. 2001: Topics
6. 2002: Organic
7. 2004: Fantasy
8. 2006: Akko
9. 2008: Identity (アイデンティティー, Aidentiti)
10. 2008: Acoakko
11. 2009: Sora no Shirushi (そらのしるし, "Sky Symbol")
12. 2010: Acoakko Debut
13. 2015: re:evergreen

=== Compilation albums ===
1. 2001: Singles
2. 2004: Self Collection: 15 Currents
3. 2010: Best Collection

=== Singles ===
1. 1995: "Man & Woman/My Painting"
2. 1995: "Shiroi Kaito" (白いカイト, "White Kite")
3. 1995: "Hello, Again (Mukashi Kara Aru Basho)"
4. 1996: "Alice"
5. 1996: "Now and Then (Ushinawareta Toki o Motomete)" (NOW AND THEN ～失われた時を求めて～, "Seeking Lost Time")
6. 1996: "Yes (Free Flower)"
7. 1997: "Animal Life"
8. 1997: "Shuffle"
9. 1997: "Private Eyes"
10. 1998: "Sora no Shita de" (空の下で, "Under the Sky")
11. 1998: "Destiny"
12. 1998: "Crazy Love/Days"
13. 2001: "Shooting Star" (shooting star ～シューティングスター～, Shūtingu Sutā)
14. 2001: "Higasa (Japanese Beauty)" (日傘 ～Japanese beauty～, "Parasol")
15. 2002: "Survival"
16. 2004: "Kaze to Sora no Kilim" (風と空のキリム, "A Kilim of Wind and Sky")
17. 2006: "Ribbon" (り・ぼん, Ri Bon)
18. 2007: "Afureru" (あふれる, "Overflowing")
19. 2007: "Dreamy Success"
20. 2008: "Labyrinth" (ラビリンス, Rabirinsu)
21. 2008: "Initial" (イニシャル, Inisharu)
22. 2009: "Oto no Nai Sekai/Toki no Bell" (音のない世界/時のベル, "Soundless World/Bell of Time")
23. 2009: "Blue Sky"
24. 2011: ひこうき雲
25. 2015: ターミナル

=== Video & DVD ===
1. 1998: Sign of Thursday
2. 2001: Clips
