= Lighthouse Family discography =

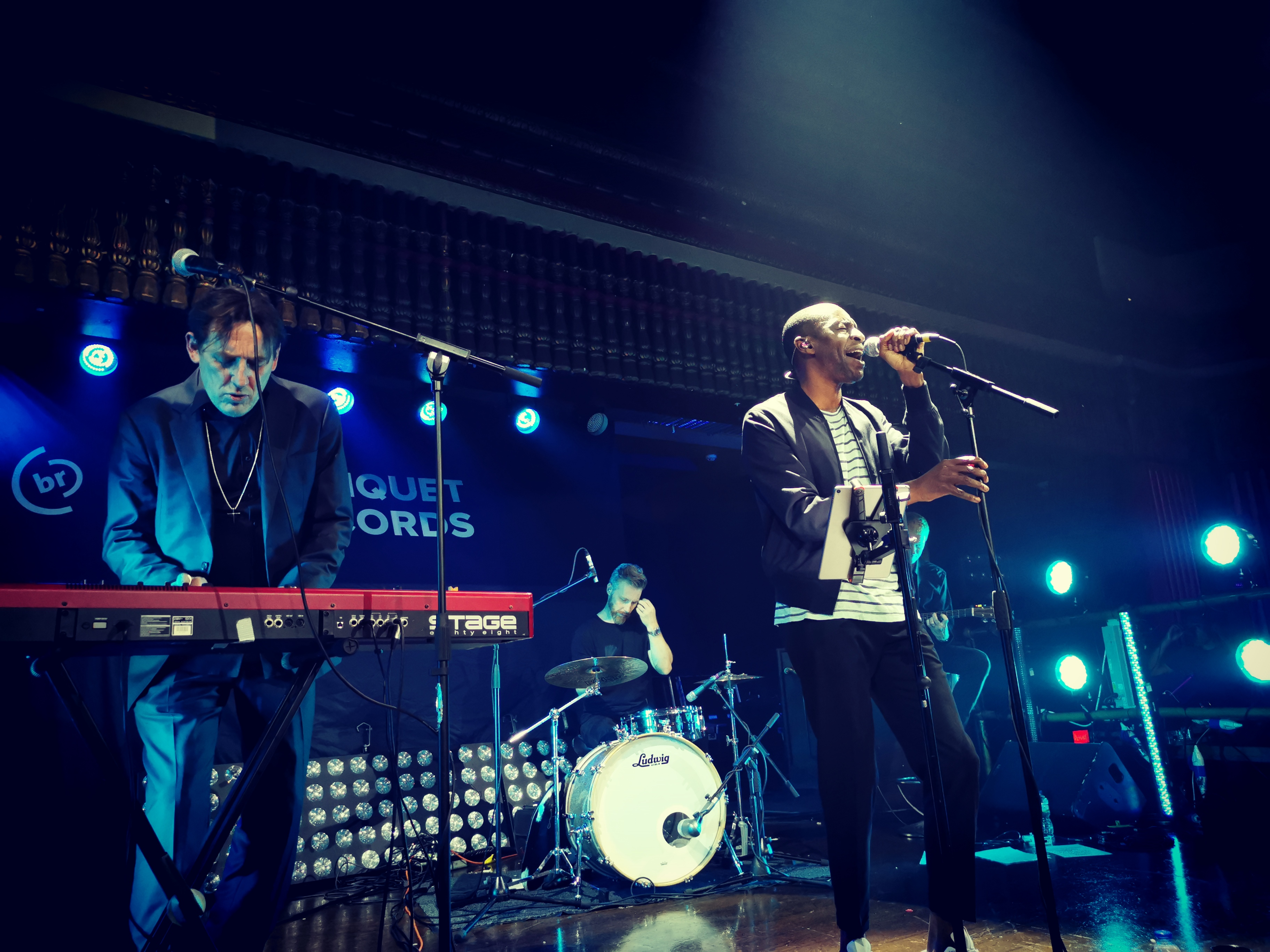
- Lighthouse Family performing in 2019
- Studio albums: 4
- Compilation albums: 2
- Remix albums: 1
- Singles: 16
- Music videos: 12

British musical duo Lighthouse Family released four studio albums, two compilation albums, one remix album, 16 singles and 12 music videos.

== Albums ==
=== Studio albums ===
List of studio albums, with selected details, chart positions and certifications
Title	Details	Peak chart positions										Certifications
Title	Details	UK	AUS	AUT	BEL (FL)	FRA	GER	NL	NZ	SWE	SWI	Certifications
Ocean Drive	Released: 11 November 1995; Label: Wildcard (#5237872); Formats: CD, cassette	3	—	—	—	—	26	—	—	—	—	BPI: 6× Platinum
Postcards from Heaven	Released: 24 October 1997; Label: Wildcard (#5395162); Formats: CD, cassette	2	2	18	19	44	5	16	6	32	12	BPI: 4× Platinum; ARIA: Platinum; BVMI: Platinum
Whatever Gets You Through the Day	Released: 26 November 2001; Label: Wildcard (#5894122); Formats: CD, cassette	7	182	21	—	—	3	88	—	—	29	BPI: Platinum; BVMI: Platinum
Blue Sky in Your Head	Released: 5 July 2019; Label: Polydor; Formats: CD, digital download, streaming	3	—	—	—	—	—	—	—	—	—	BPI: Gold
"—" denotes releases that did not chart or were not released in that region.

=== Compilation albums ===
List of compilation albums, with selected details, chart positions and certifications
Title	Details	Peak chart positions				Certifications
Title	Details	UK	AUT	GER	SWI	Certifications
Greatest Hits	Released: 18 November 2002; Label: Wildcard (#0654482); Formats: CD, cassette	23	36	12	66	BPI: 2× Platinum; BVMI: Gold
The Very Best Of	Released: 7 April 2003; Label: Wildcard (#0761662); Formats: CD, cassette	9	—	—	—	BPI: Platinum
"—" denotes releases that did not chart or were not released in that region.

=== Remix albums ===
List of compilation albums, with selected details
Title	Details
Relaxed & Remixed	Released: 24 February 2004; Label: Wildcard; Formats: CD, cassette

== Singles ==
List of singles, with selected chart positions, showing year released, certifications and album name
Title	Year	Peak chart positions										Certifications	Album
Title	Year	UK	AUS	AUT	GER	IRE	NL	NZ	SWE	SWI	US AC	Certifications	Album
"Lifted" (Note: "Lifted" was originally released in the UK in May 1995 and peaked at number 61, but was re-released in February 1996 and reached a new peak of four. Dutch chart entry for "Lifted" is from 1999, as it failed to chart in 1996.)	1995	4	178	36	62	15	85	—	—	—	—	BPI: Platinum	Ocean Drive
"Ocean Drive" (Note: "Ocean Drive" was originally released in the UK in October 1995 and peaked at number 34, but was re-released in May 1996 and reached a new peak of eleven.)	1995	11	—	—	69	—	—	—	—	—	—	BPI: Platinum	Ocean Drive
"Goodbye Heartbreak"	1996	14	—	—	86	—	—	—	—	—	—		Ocean Drive
"Loving Every Minute"	1996	20	—	—	98	—	—	—	50	—	—		Ocean Drive
"Raincloud"	1997	6	29	—	70	26	71	—	—	—	—		Postcards from Heaven
"High"	1997	4	1	4	4	3	8	8	18	2	23	BPI: Platinum; ARIA: Platinum; BVMI: Gold; RMNZ: Platinum	Postcards from Heaven
"Lost in Space"	1998	6	—	—	—	14	—	—	—	—	—	BPI: Silver	Postcards from Heaven
"Question of Faith"	1998	21	—	—	66	—	83	—	—	—	—		Postcards from Heaven
"Postcard from Heaven"	1998	24	—	—	—	—	—	—	—	—	—		Postcards from Heaven
"(I Wish I Knew How It Would Feel to Be) Free/One"	2001	6	92	14	10	26	85	—	—	26	—		Whatever Gets You Through the Day
"Run"	2002	30	138	75	—	—	—	—	—	71	—		Whatever Gets You Through the Day
"Happy"	2002	51	—	—	82	—	—	—	—	—	—		Whatever Gets You Through the Day
"I Could Have Loved You"	2003	—	—	—	—	—	—	—	—	—	—		Greatest Hits
"My Salvation"	2019	—	—	—	—	—	—	—	—	—	—		Blue Sky in Your Head
"Live Again"	2019	—	—	—	—	—	—	—	—	—	—		Blue Sky in Your Head
"Light On"	2019	—	—	—	—	—	—	—	—	—	—		Blue Sky in Your Head
"—" denotes releases that did not chart or were not released in that region.

== Music videos ==
Year	Title	Director	Album
1995	"Lifted"	Norman Watson	Ocean Drive
1995	"Ocean Drive"	Marcus Nispel	Ocean Drive
1996	"Goodbye Heartbreak"		Ocean Drive
1996	"Loving Every Minute"	Cameron Casey	Ocean Drive
1997	"Raincloud"	Howard Greenhalgh	Postcards from Heaven
1997	"High"	Norman Watson	Postcards from Heaven
1998	"Lost in Space"		Postcards from Heaven
1998	"Question of Faith"	Norman Watson	Postcards from Heaven
1999	"Postcard from Heaven"		Postcards from Heaven
2001	"(I Wish I Knew How It Would Feel to Be) Free/One"		Whatever Gets You Through the Day
2002	"Run"		Whatever Gets You Through the Day
2002	"Happy"		Whatever Gets You Through the Day
