= Greatest Hits (Lighthouse Family album) =

Compilation album by Lighthouse Family

Greatest hits album by Lighthouse Family
- Released: 18 November 2002 (UK)
- Recorded: 1995–2002
- Length: 1:14:35
- Label: Wildcard / Polydor
- Producer: Mike Peden, Paul Tucker, Tim Laws, Kevin Bacon, Jonathan Quarmby

Lighthouse Family chronology
Whatever Gets You Through the Day (2001)	Greatest Hits (2002)	Relaxed & Remixed (2004)

The Very Best Of
- 2003 version

Singles from Greatest Hits
- 1. "I Could Have Loved You" Released: 4 March 2003

Greatest Hits is a greatest hits compilation album released by UK duo Lighthouse Family on 18 November 2002 on Wildcard / Polydor. There are two different versions of this album, one with the two bonus tracks, "Lifted" (Linslee Mix) and "End of the Sky", and one without them. This album reached 2× Platinum status in 2014 twelve years after its release.

On 7 April 2003, The Very Best Of was released, containing the same track listing and bonus tracks. The difference is that one can download an additional seven acoustic tracks from a website. This album reached platinum status.

This album contains all the band's singles, plus the album track "End of the Sky", the B-side "Absolutely Everything", a cover version of the Bill Withers song "Ain't No Sunshine" recorded for the Notting Hill soundtrack, and the new song "I Could Have Loved You", which was released as the new single from the album in March 2003.

== Track listing ==
No.	Title	Writer(s)	Producer(s)	Length
1.	"Lifted" (7" Version)	Tunde Baiyewu; Paul Tucker; Martin Brammer	Mike Peden	4:21
2.	"Ocean Drive" (7" Radio Mix)	Tucker	Peden	4:01
3.	"High"	Baiyewu; Tucker	Peden	5:10
4.	"Raincloud" (7" Mix)	Baiyewu; Tucker; Brammer	Peden	4:06
5.	"Lost in Space"	Tucker; Tim Laws	Peden	5:22
6.	"Loving Every Minute"	Baiyewu; Tucker; Brammer; Shaun Ward	Peden	4:10
7.	"(I Wish I Knew How It Would Feel to Be) Free / One"	Billy Taylor; Dick Dallas; Paul Hewson; Dave Evans; Larry Mullen; Adam Clayton	Kevin Bacon; Jonathan Quarmby	5:16
8.	"Question of Faith" (7" Mix)	Baiyewu; Tucker; Laws	Peden	3:52
9.	"Ain't No Sunshine"	Bill Withers	Peden	3:42
10.	"Goodbye Heartbreak"	Baiyewu; Tucker; Tim Kellett	Peden	4:11
11.	"Run"	Tucker; George Morton	Bacon; Quarmby	4:01
12.	"Postcard from Heaven" (7" Mix)	Tucker	Peden	4:22
13.	"Happy"	Tucker	Bacon; Quarmby	4:35
14.	"I Could Have Loved You"	Baiyewu; Tucker	Peden	4:00
15.	"Absolutely Everything"	Baiyewu; Tucker	Peden	3:57
16.	"Lifted" (Linslee Mix)	Baiyewu; Tucker; Brammer	Linslee	4:02
17.	"End of the Sky" (Phil Bodger Mix)	Tucker	Phil Bodger	4:59

== Charts ==
Greatest Hits

Country	Position
United Kingdom	23
Austria	36
Switzerland	66

The Very Best Of

Country	Position
United Kingdom	9

== Certifications ==
Certifications for Greatest Hits
Region	Certification	Certified units/sales
Germany (BVMI)	Gold	150,000^{‡}
United Kingdom (BPI)	2× Platinum	600,000^{*}
^{*} Sales figures based on certification alone.^{‡} Sales+streaming figures based on certification alone.

Certifications for The Very Best Of
Region	Certification	Certified units/sales
United Kingdom (BPI)	Platinum	300,000^{^}
^{^} Shipments figures based on certification alone.
