= Relaxed & Remixed =

Remix album by Lighthouse Family
- Released: 24 February 2004 (UK)
- Recorded: 1995–2002
- Length: 1:12:21
- Label: Wildcard / Polydor
- Producer: Mike Peden, Paul Tucker, Tim Laws, Linslee Campbell, D'Influence, Todd Terry, The Basement Boys

Lighthouse Family chronology
Greatest Hits (2002)	Relaxed & Remixed (2004)	Blue Sky in Your Head (2019)

Singles from Relaxed & Remixed
- 1. "From a Desert to a Beach" Released: 24 January 2004

Relaxed & Remixed is a remix album released by UK duo Lighthouse Family on 24 November 2004 on Wildcard / Polydor.

It contains remixes and acoustic versions of previously released singles, as well as the non-album B-side "From a Desert to a Beach".

== Track listing ==
#	Title	Original release	Length
1	"Lost in Space" (Itaal Shur's Full Mix)	"Lost in Space" single	5:05
2	"High" (Acoustic Version) (Live)	"Lost in Space" single	4:06
3	"Goodbye Heartbreak" (Linslee Main Mix)	"Goodbye Heartbreak" single	5:19
4	"Postcard from Heaven" (7" Mix)	"Postcard from Heaven" single	4:20
5	"(I Wish I Knew How It Would Feel to Be) Free / One" (Phats & Small Vocal)	"(I Wish I Knew How It Would Feel to Be) Free / One" single	7:34
6	"Question of Faith" (Tee's Freeze Mix)	"Question of Faith" 12" single	6:21
7	"High" (Vocal 12")	"High" single	11:36
8	"From a Desert to a Beach"	"Raincloud" single	4:24
9	"Ocean Drive" (Acoustic Version)	"Goodbye Heartbreak" single	3:09
10	"Lifted" (Acoustic Version)	"Ocean Drive" re-release single	3:12
11	"Run" (D'Influence Vocal Mix)	"Run" single	4:52
12	"Raincloud" (Basement Boys Paradox Vocal)	"Raincloud" single	8:11
13	"Ocean Drive" (Mindspell's Miami Beach Experience – Radio Mix)	"Goodbye Heartbreak" single	4:12
