= I Could Have Loved You =

Single by Lighthouse Family

from the album Greatest Hits
- Released: 4 March 2003
- Studio: Sarm West (London)
- Genre: Pop
- Length: 3:59
- Label: Wildcard; Polydor
- Songwriter(s): Tunde Baiyewu; Paul Tucker
- Producer(s): Mike Peden

Lighthouse Family singles chronology
"Happy" (2002)	"I Could Have Loved You" (2003)	"My Salvation" (2019)

"I Could Have Loved You" is a song by British duo Lighthouse Family. Taken from their compilation album Greatest Hits (2002), it was released in March 2003 but didn't enter any singles charts worldwide. The song was produced by Mike Peden.

== Track listing ==
- CD
1. "I Could Have Loved You" (Album Version) — 3:59
2. "End of the Sky" (Phil Bodger Mix) — 4:58
3. "Lifted" (Linslee 7" Mix) — 4:00
4. "I Could Have Loved You" (Music Video)

== Charts ==
Weekly chart performance for "I Could Have Loved You"
Chart (2003)	Peak position
Hungary (Editors' Choice Top 40)	26
