= Loving Every Minute (Lighthouse Family song) =

Single by Lighthouse Family

from the album Ocean Drive
- Released: 19 November 1996
- Studio: Battery
- Genre: Pop; R&B
- Length: 4:14
- Label: Wildcard; Polydor
- Songwriters: Paul Tucker; Tunde Baiyewu; Martin Brammer
- Producer: Mike Peden

Lighthouse Family singles chronology
| "Goodbye Heartbreak" (1996) | "Loving Every Minute" (1996) | "Raincloud" (1997) |

Music video
- "Loving Every Minute" on YouTube

"Loving Every Minute" is a 1996 song by British duo Lighthouse Family, released as the fourth and final single from their debut album Ocean Drive (1996). The song was produced by Mike Peden. It was released in November 1996 and reached the top 20 in the United Kingdom. It was remixed by Cutfather & Joe for its single release, adding a drum beat and a slightly different introduction.

== Critical reception ==
British magazine Music Week rated the song three out of five, adding, "With more soul and less pop than its predecessors, this is not as instant as 'Lifted', but will undoubtedly let the duo round off the year with another hit."

== Chart performance ==
After the release of "Loving Every Minute", the single reached number 20 in the UK, becoming their fourth successive top 20 hit since their first re-release of "Lifted" in February 1996. The song stayed on the UK Singles Chart for 7 weeks.

"Loving Every Minute" also charted on the Swedish singles chart, peaking at number 50 in March 1997 and staying on the chart for 3 weeks.

The song also entered the Eurochart Hot 100, peaking at number 62 in December 1996 and staying on the chart for 3 weeks.

== Track listings ==
- UK CD1
1. "Loving Every Minute" (Cutfather & Joe remix) — 4:14
2. "Sweetest Operator" (live) — 7:41
3. "Beautiful Night" (live) — 5:26
4. "Ocean Drive" (live acoustic encore) — 3:33
- UK CD2
1. "Loving Every Minute" (Cutfather & Joe remix) — 4:19
2. "Loving Every Minute" (album version) — 4:11
3. "Loving Every Minute" (Cutfather & Joe alternative mix) — 4:19
4. "Loving Every Minute" (Cutfather & Joe instrumental) — 4:17
- UK cassette
1. "Loving Every Minute" (Cutfather & Joe remix) — 4:19
2. "Loving Every Minute" (album version) — 4:11

== Charts ==
| Chart (1996) | Peak position |
|---|---|
| Europe (Eurochart Hot 100) | 62 |
| Germany (GfK) | 98 |
| Scotland (OCC) | 29 |
| Sweden (Sverigetopplistan) | 50 |
| UK Singles (Official Charts) | 20 |
