= Postcards from Heaven =

1997 album by Lighthouse Family

Studio album by Lighthouse Family
- Released: 20 October 1997 (UK)
- Recorded: December 1996 – August 1997
- Genres: Pop; easy listening; soul
- Length: 47:19
- Labels: Wildcard; Polydor
- Producer: Mike Peden

Lighthouse Family chronology
Ocean Drive (1995)	Postcards from Heaven (1997)	Whatever Gets You Through the Day (2001)

Singles from Postcards from Heaven
- 1. "Raincloud" Released: 29 September 1997; 2. "High" Released: 29 December 1997; 3. "Lost in Space" Released: 13 June 1998; 4. "Question of Faith" Released: 28 September 1998; 5. "Postcard from Heaven" Released: 28 December 1998

Professional ratings
Review scores
Source	Rating
AllMusic	3/5 stars
Music Week	4/5 stars
NME	5/10

Postcards from Heaven is the second studio album by the English music duo Lighthouse Family. It was released on 20 October 1997 on Wildcard / Polydor Records. The album produced three top-10 hits ("Raincloud", "High" and "Lost in Space") and two top-30 hits ("Question of Faith" and "Postcard from Heaven") in the UK, with "High" also reaching number one in Australia.

== Track listing ==
Postcards from Heaven track listing
No.	Title	Writer(s)	Producer(s)	Length
1.	"Raincloud"	Tunde Baiyewu; Paul Tucker; Martin Brammer	Mike Peden	4:33
2.	"Once in a Blue Moon"	Tucker	Peden	3:54
3.	"Question of Faith"	Baiyewu; Tucker; Tim Laws	Peden	4:32
4.	"Let It All Change"	Baiyewu; Tucker	Peden	5:14
5.	"Sun in the Night"	Tucker; Laws	Peden	5:21
6.	"High"	Baiyewu; Tucker	Peden	5:10
7.	"Lost in Space"	Tucker; Laws	Peden	5:22
8.	"When I Was Younger"	Baiyewu	Peden	4:16
9.	"Restless"	Tucker	Peden	4:37
10.	"Postcard from Heaven"	Tucker	Peden	4:20

Postcards from Heaven – Revised edition
No.	Title	Writer(s)	Producer(s)	Length
8.	"Lifted"	Baiyewu; Tucker; Brammer	Mike Peden	4:31

Postcards from Heaven – Japanese edition
No.	Title	Writer(s)	Producer(s)	Length
12.	"From a Desert to a Beach"	Baiyewu; Tucker; Tim Kellett	Tucker; Laws	4:28

Postcards from Heaven – Brazilian edition
No.	Title	Writer(s)	Producer(s)	Length
11.	"Raincloud" (Cuca's Radio Edit)	Baiyewu; Tucker; Brammer	Cuca
12.	"High" (Monster Edit)	Baiyewu; Tucker	Monster

Postcards from Heaven – Deluxe edition (bonus disc)
No.	Title	Writer(s)	Producer(s)	Length
1.	"High" (Itaal Shur's Beautiful Urban Mix)	Baiyewu; Tucker	Itaal Shur	6:40
2.	"High" (Inner City Mix)	Baiyewu; Tucker	Inner City	6:42
3.	"Raincloud" (Basement Boys Style 12" Mix)	Baiyewu; Tucker; Brammer	Basement Boys	8:05
4.	"Raincloud" (D'Influence Mix)	Baiyewu; Tucker; Brammer	D'Influence	5:26
5.	"Lifted" (Linslee 7" Mix)	Baiyewu; Tucker; Brammer	Linslee	4:01
6.	"Ocean Drive" (Linslee R&B Mix)	Tucker	Linslee	4:01

== Personnel ==
- Tunde Baiyewu – vocals
- Craig Ross, Graham Kearns, Phil Hudson – guitar
- Jack Daley – bass
- Peter Gordeno – organ, Rhodes piano
- Paul Tucker – keyboards
- Pete Wingfield – piano
- Ben Hillier, Rupert Brown – drums
- Danny Cummings, Luís Jardim – percussion
- Phil Todd – flute, brass
- Lain Gray, Lawrence Johnson, Mint Juleps, Tee Green – backing vocals
- The London Session Orchestra – strings
- Nick Ingman – string arrangements

== Charts ==
=== Weekly charts ===
Weekly chart performance for Postcards from Heaven
Chart (1997–1998)	Peak position
Australian Albums (ARIA)	2
Austrian Albums (Ö3 Austria)	18
Belgian Albums (Ultratop Flanders)	19
Belgian Albums (Ultratop Wallonia)	46
Dutch Albums (Album Top 100)	16
French Albums (SNEP)	44
German Albums (Offizielle Top 100)	5
Hungarian Albums (MAHASZ)	6
New Zealand Albums (RMNZ)	6
Norwegian Albums (VG-lista)	23
Scottish Albums (Official Charts)	9
Swedish Albums (Sverigetopplistan)	32
Swiss Albums (Schweizer Hitparade)	12
UK Albums (Official Charts)	2

=== Year-end charts ===
1997 year-end chart performance for Postcards from Heaven
Chart (1997)	Position
UK Albums (OCC)	14

1998 year-end chart performance for Postcards from Heaven
Chart (1998)	Position
Australian Albums (ARIA)	33
Dutch Albums (Album Top 100)	60
German Albums (Offizielle Top 100)	11
Spanish Albums (AFYPE)	30
UK Albums (OCC)	11

== Certifications and sales ==
Certifications and sales for Postcards from Heaven
Region	Certification	Certified units/sales
Australia (ARIA)	Platinum	70,000^{^}
Germany (BVMI)	Platinum	500,000^{^}
Netherlands (NVPI)	Gold	50,000^{^}
New Zealand (RMNZ)	Platinum	15,000^{^}
Philippines	—	200,000
Spain (Promusicae)	2× Platinum	200,000^{^}
Switzerland (IFPI Switzerland)	Platinum	50,000^{^}
United Kingdom (BPI)	4× Platinum	1,200,000^{^}
^{^} Shipments figures based on certification alone.
