= Postcard from Heaven =

Single by Lighthouse Family

from the album Postcards from Heaven
- Released: 28 December 1998
- Studio: Miraval (France); Sarm West (London)
- Genre: Pop
- Length: 3:59
- Label: Wildcard; Polydor
- Songwriter(s): Paul Tucker
- Producer(s): Paul Tucker; Tim Laws

Lighthouse Family singles chronology
"Question of Faith" (1998)	"Postcard from Heaven" (1998)	"(I Wish I Knew How It Would Feel to Be) Free/One" (2001)

Alternative cover

"Postcard from Heaven" is a song by the Lighthouse Family, released as the duo's fifth and final single from their second album Postcards from Heaven (1999). The song was produced by Mike Peden. It was released on 28 December 1998 and reached the top 30 in the UK as well as being just outside the top 90 in Europe. It received a completely different remixed version for single release. This mix appeared on both the Greatest Hits and Relaxed & Remixed compilations, in 2002 and 2004 respectively.

== Chart performance ==
"Postcard from Heaven" reached number 24 on the UK Singles Chart and stayed in the charts for 6 weeks. It also reached number 91 on the Eurochart Hot 100 but it only stayed in the charts for 1 week.

== Track listing ==
- UK CD
1. "Postcard from Heaven" (7" mix) — 4:22
2. "Ocean Drive" (demo) — 3:54
3. "Let It All Change" (demo) — 4:47
- European CD / UK cassette
1. "Postcard from Heaven" (7" mix) — 4:22
2. "Once in a Blue Moon" (demo) — 4:14

== Charts ==
Chart (1999)	Peak position
Europe (Eurochart Hot 100)	91
UK Singles (OCC)	24
