= High (Lighthouse Family song) =

1997 single by Lighthouse Family

Single by Lighthouse Family

from the album Postcards from Heaven
- Released: 29 December 1997
- Recorded: August 1997
- Studio: Miraval (Correns, France); Sarm West (London, England)
- Genre: Pop; R&B
- Length: 5:10 (album version); 5:13 (single version)
- Label: Wildcard; Polydor
- Songwriter: Paul Tucker
- Producer: Mike Peden

Lighthouse Family singles chronology
"Raincloud" (1997)	"High" (1997)	"Lost in Space" (1998)

Music video
- "High" on YouTube

"High" is a song by British musical duo Lighthouse Family from their second album, Postcards from Heaven (1997). The song was produced by Mike Peden and was released on 29 December 1997 as the second single from the album. "High" is the most successful single released by Lighthouse Family, reaching number four on the UK Singles Chart, number eight in New Zealand, and number one in Australia. In Europe, the song reached the top 10 in at least eight countries.

== Background ==
In March 2021, songwriter Paul Tucker told the Official Charts Company the story behind the song:

"High was probably the most difficult song to write of all of them. Without getting too heavy, my wife lost a baby on New Year's Eve in 1996, the year that the album [Ocean Drive] was a hit. Lifted was a hit and Ocean Drive was a hit. It was the first week in 1997 I started writing High, and I had the bit: 'One day we're gonna get so high'. That was the same week – and this is absolutely incidental, it’s nothing to do with the song - although a Newcastle United fan might think it is – that Kevin Keegan left Newcastle United. I just remember that week so well because of what happened.

It took about eight months to write the song. When we did Ocean Drive there was no pressure, we hadn't sold any records so nobody was expecting anything, whereas when we got to the second album which is what this was, there were a lot of people who were saying, 'this is huge, this is massive, this is the hit on the record.' And I hadn't even finished writing it, so immediately I'm under this enormous pressure.

We started recording Postcards from Heaven in March 1997 and we went to Miramont in France to start recording it. We were there until about June and the whole time I was sitting in the room on my own with a blank sheet of paper trying to write High and driving myself mad with it. Everybody kept saying 'have you done it yet?' and I hadn’t.

Then they took the recording back to London and SARM West, which is Trevor Horn's studio in Notting Hill, and we took the album back there to record the second batch of songs. The first batch had songs like Raincloud in it, while the second was songs like Sun in the Night and High. We recorded the backing tracks for all that stuff, we got the tunes together, we had the top, they had Tunde's vocals.

But before we went back to London, I spent a few weeks in Nice on my own to finish High - I have to be on my own to write lyrics – and I just couldn't get it together. Then I went back to London to work on it in SARM again. By the very last day of recording, we'd recorded all of the stuff on the second album apart from Tunde’s vocals on High. It was the last job to do and I still hadn't written the lyrics. I still hadn't written it.

The night before that, I just wrote down what I was thinking, which was, 'when you're close to tears remember someday it'll all be over'. It was how I felt, I just wanted to get this song over and done with. As soon as I'd written that the whole thing came together. It just fell into place. So in truth, High is actually a description of a very uncomfortable situation.

== Critical reception ==
Chuck Taylor of Billboard wrote, "After being released in the U.K. nearly a year ago, this spiritual gem of a single is finally seeing the light of day here. One of many high points on the duo's delicious sophomore album, "Postcards From Heaven", "High" has been released to AC radio in its original form. For the clubs and dance radio, it has been lovingly reconstructed by two of clubland's most revered remixers: Boris Dlugosch and Francois Kevorkian. In its original state, "High" is a postcard-perfect R&B-splashed slice of pop music. In the hands of both Dlugosch and Kevorkian, it becomes an anthemic house inflected pop song. There is just no denying the song's buoyant beats, mahogany-hued vocals, and soaring rhythms. It's one of those songs that truly deserves to be a hit at both radio and clubs. If, as Faithless proclaims, God is a DJ, "High" is poised for much success." Scottish newspaper Daily Record commented, "There's nothing like working to a formula. First they were lifted, now they're high". A reviewer from Music Week gave the song four out of five, adding, "The anthemic backing vocals provide a slight twist, but otherwise there are no surprises here — the duo produce another single of fautless quality which radio will find impossible to ignore."

== Music video ==
A music video was made to accompany the song. The clip is in black and white, except when Tunde Baiyewu begins to sing. There are scenes of Paul Tucker getting off the train at Newcastle upon Tyne and exiting the city's Central Station. There are also scenes of Baiyewu singing in an autumn park and the Tynemouth beach, standing outside the Cruddas Park (now Riverside Dene) flats in Elswick, a girl lying and rolling on the grass while playing with flowers, and an abandoned house near Dungeness.

Filmed in North East England and Kent, the video shows some prominent local landmarks: the Tyne Bridge is shown at the very start along with the Quayside, and a number of shots of Baiyewu take place on the Middlesbrough Transporter Bridge, Port Clarence and Haverton Hill, which is also the backdrop for the single covers.

== Track listings ==
- UK CD1
1. "High" (full length version)
2. "High" (Itaal Shur's Beautiful Urban mix)
3. "High" (Full Crew main mix)
4. "High" (Itaal Shur's Beautiful Urban Dreamscape mix)
- UK CD2
1. "High" (full length version)
2. "High" (vocal 12-inch)
3. "High" (Interplanetary Disco mix)
4. "High" (E-Dancer dub)
5. "High" (Inner City mix)
- UK cassette single
1. "High" (full length version)
2. "High" (Itaal Shur's Beautiful Urban edit)
- European CD single
1. "High" (7-inch edit) – 4:35
2. "High" (Itaal Shur's Beautiful Urban edit) – 3:43
- Australian CD single
1. "High" (7-inch edit) – 4:35
2. "Lifted" (7-inch) – 4:30
3. "Ocean Drive" (7-inch radio mix) – 3:59
4. "High" (Itaal Shur's Beautiful Urban edit) – 3:43

== Charts ==
=== Weekly charts ===
Chart (1998)	Peak position
Australia (ARIA)	1
Austria (Ö3 Austria Top 40)	4
Belgium (Ultratop 50 Flanders)	4
Belgium (Ultratop 50 Wallonia)	20
Canada Adult Contemporary (RPM)	10
Europe (Eurochart Hot 100)	4
Germany (GfK)	4
Hungary (Mahasz)	5
Ireland (IRMA)	3
Italy (Musica e dischi)	7
Italy Airplay (Music & Media)	6
Netherlands (Dutch Top 40)	6
Netherlands (Single Top 100)	8
New Zealand (Recorded Music NZ)	8
Scottish Singles Sales (Official Charts)	4
Sweden (Sverigetopplistan)	18
Switzerland (Schweizer Hitparade)	2
UK Singles (Official Charts)	4
UK Hip Hop/R&B (Official Charts)	2
US Adult Contemporary (Billboard)	23
US Dance Club Play (Billboard)	21

=== Year-end charts ===
Chart (1998)	Position
Australia (ARIA)	11
Austria (Ö3 Austria Top 40)	39
Belgium (Ultratop 50 Flanders)	32
Belgium (Ultratop 50 Wallonia)	77
Brazil (Crowley)	43
Canada Adult Contemporary (RPM)	45
Europe (Eurochart Hot 100)	22
Germany (Media Control)	23
Netherlands (Dutch Top 40)	19
Netherlands (Single Top 100)	39
Sweden (Hitlistan)	82
Switzerland (Schweizer Hitparade)	14
UK Singles (OCC)	35

== Certifications ==
Region	Certification	Certified units/sales
Australia (ARIA)	Platinum	70,000^{^}
Belgium (BRMA)	Gold	25,000^{*}
Denmark (IFPI Danmark)	Gold	45,000^{‡}
Germany (BVMI)	Gold	250,000^{^}
Italy (FIMI)	Gold	25,000^{‡}
New Zealand (RMNZ)	Platinum	30,000^{‡}
Spain (Promusicae)	Gold	30,000^{‡}
Switzerland (IFPI Switzerland)	Gold	25,000^{^}
United Kingdom (BPI)	Platinum	600,000^{‡}
^{*} Sales figures based on certification alone.^{^} Shipments figures based on certification alone.^{‡} Sales+streaming figures based on certification alone.

== Release history ==
Region	Date	Format(s)	Label(s)	Ref.
United Kingdom	29 December 1997	CD; cassette	Wildcard; Polydor	
United States	3 November 1998	Contemporary hit radio	Island	
