= Happy (Lighthouse Family song) =

Single by Lighthouse Family

from the album Whatever Gets You Through the Day
- Released: 24 June 2002
- Studio: The Beach; Olympic (London); AIR (London)
- Genre: Pop; disco
- Length: 4:35
- Label: Wildcard; Polydor
- Songwriter(s): Paul Tucker
- Producer(s): Kevin Bacon; Jonathan Quarmby

Lighthouse Family singles chronology
"Run" (2002)	"Happy" (2002)	"I Could Have Loved You" (2003)

"Happy" is a song by Lighthouse Family, which was released as a single on 24 June 2002. The song was the third pop single written by British duo Lighthouse Family for their third album Whatever Gets You Through the Day (2001). The song was produced by Kevin Bacon and Jonathan Quarmby. The song reached outside the top 50 in the United Kingdom as well as being in the top 30 in the World RnB Top 30 Singles Chart.

== Chart performance ==
Following its release, "Happy" reached number 51 on the UK Singles Chart, and stayed in the charts for 1 week. The song also reached the top 30 on the World RnB Top 30 Singles chart and stayed in the charts for 3 weeks.

== Track listing ==
- UK CD1
1. "Happy" — 4:35
2. "High" (Francois K Vocal Mix) — 10:34
3. "Whatever Gets You Through the Day" — 4:40
4. "Happy" (Video)
- UK CD2
1. "Happy" — 4:35
2. "Happy" (Rui Da Silva Mix) — 7:07
3. "Happy" (Ferry Corsten Mix) — 7:51
- UK cassette
1. "Happy" — 4:35
2. "Happy" (Manhattan Clique Vocal Mix) — 8:23
- European CD1
1. "Happy" — 4:35
2. "Happy" (Rui Da Silva Mix) — 7:07
3. "High" (Francois K Vocal Mix) — 10:34
4. "Whatever Gets You Through the Day" — 4:40
5. "Happy" (Video)
- European CD2: The Remixes
1. "Happy" — 4:35
2. "Happy" (Rui Da Silva Mix) — 7:07
3. "Happy" (Manhattan Clique Vocal Mix) — 8:23
4. "Happy" (Liquid People Club Mix) — 7:23
5. "Happy" (Ferry Corsten Mix) — 7:51

== Charts ==
Chart (2002)	Peak position
Poland (Polish Airplay Chart)	10
UK Singles (OCC)	51
World RnB Top 30 Singles	26
