= Raincloud =

Raincloud can refer to:

- Nimbus cloud
- "Raincloud" (song), by the Lighthouse Family

== See also ==
- "Little Black Rain Cloud", a song from the 1966 animated film Winnie the Pooh and the Honey Tree
- The Raincloud Man, an audio drama based on the British science fiction television series Doctor Who
