= Question of Faith =

1998 single by Lighthouse Family

Single by Lighthouse Family

from the album Postcards from Heaven
- Released: 28 September 1998
- Studio: Miraval (France); Sarm West (London)
- Length: 3:52
- Label: Polydor; Wildcard
- Songwriter(s): Paul Tucker
- Producer(s): Mike Peden

Lighthouse Family singles chronology
"Lost in Space" (1998)	"Question of Faith" (1998)	"Postcard from Heaven" (1998)

Alternative cover

"Question of Faith" is a song by British pop soul duo Lighthouse Family, released as the fourth single from their second album, Postcards from Heaven (1997). Produced by Mike Peden, it was released in September 1998 and peaked at number 21 on the UK singles chart.

== Track listings ==
- UK CD1
1. "Question of Faith" (7-inch mix) – 3:52
2. "Question of Faith" (Idjut Boys mix edit) – 7:27
3. "Question of Faith" (Disco Central mix) – 8:58
- UK CD2
1. "Question of Faith" (7-inch mix) – 3:52
2. "Question of Faith" (Itaal Shur's main mix) – 4:23
3. "Question of Faith" (Phil "The Kick Drum" Dane & Matt Smith's Under Pressure vocal mix) – 8:33
- UK cassette
1. "Question of Faith" (7-inch mix) – 3:52
2. "Question of Faith" (Idjut Boys mix edit) – 7:27
- European CD
1. "Question of Faith" (7-inch mix) – 3:51
2. "Question of Faith" (Tee's radio edit) – 3:30
3. "Question of Faith" (Tee's Freeze mix) – 6:20
4. "High" (acoustic live at the Royal Albert Hall) – 4:08

== Charts ==
Chart (1998)	Peak position
Belgium (Ultratip Bubbling Under Flanders)	16
Europe (Eurochart Hot 100)	71
Germany (GfK)	66
Netherlands (Single Top 100)	83
Scotland (OCC)	31
UK Singles (OCC)	21
UK Hip Hop/R&B (OCC)	7
