= Gota Fría =

Studio album by Beth Rowley
- Released: 29 June 2018
- Genre: Blues; gospel; rock; jazz; Americana
- Length: 56:27
- Label: Stoopnik Records
- Producer: Julian Simmons, Leo Abrahams, Andy Platts

Beth Rowley chronology
Little Dreamer (2008)	Gota Fría (2018)

Gota Fría is the second studio album by English singer-songwriter Beth Rowley. It was released on 29 June 2018 in the UK.

== Track listing ==
No.	Title	Writer(s)	Length
1.	"Shut It Down"	Beth Rowley, Mary Bragg, Robby Hecht, Julian Simmons	4:25
2.	"Howl at the Moon"	Rowley, Ben Castle, Paul Wilkinson, Phil Wilkinson	4:31
3.	"Bronze"	Rowley, Simmons	3:51
4.	"Brave Face"	Rowley, Andy Platts, Jon Green	5:16
5.	"Brother"	Rowley, Ron Sexsmith	2:22
6.	"Forest Fire"	Rowley, Sexsmith	4:30
7.	"Princess"	Rowley	5:39
8.	"Get It Back"	Rowley, Marcus Bonfanti	4:54
9.	"Only One Cloud"	Rowley, Castle	6:00
10.	"Run to the Light"	Rowley, Simmons	3:30
11.	"Hide from Your Love"	Rowley, Carey Willetts	3:40
12.	"Gota Fría"	Rowley, Darren Poole	5:04
13.	"Hidden bonus track" (Follows Gota Fría after 37 seconds of silence)		2:08
