= Fiona Castle =

British dancer born 1940

Fiona Castle OBE
- Born: Joan Fiona Dickson; 1940 (age 85–86); Wirral Peninsula, Cheshire, England
- Occupation: Dancer
- Spouse: Roy Castle (m. 1963; died 1994)
- Children: 4, including Ben

Joan Fiona Castle (née Dickson; born 1940) is a British retired dancer and was the wife of TV entertainer Roy Castle. They were married from 1963 until his death from lung cancer in September 1994.

She carried on his work for the Roy Castle Lung Cancer Foundation, which her husband set up shortly before his death, for research into treatment as well as raising the profile of the illness. Her involvement with the foundation has seen her raise the profile of the illness, and call for stricter legislation on smoking, as her husband, a non-smoker, believed that his illness was caused by passive smoking, as he had worked in many smoky environments during his career.

She was a supporter of legislation which saw smoking banned from virtually all enclosed public places in Britain by July 2007.

Castle was awarded the OBE for her services to charity in the Queen's Birthday Honours 2004.

== Video ==
- Just Fiona (DVD), Christian Television Association (of the UK)
