= Roy Castle =

English musician, actor and TV presenter (1932–1994)

Roy Castle OBE
- Born: 31 August 1932; Scholes, West Riding of Yorkshire, England
- Died: 2 September 1994 (aged 62); Gerrards Cross, Buckinghamshire, England
- Occupations: Dancer; singer; comedian; actor; television presenter; musician
- Years active: 1953–1994
- Known for: Record Breakers
- Spouse: Fiona Dickson (m. 1963)
- Children: 4, including Ben

Roy Castle (31 August 1932 – 2 September 1994) was an English dancer, singer, comedian, actor, television presenter and musician. An accomplished jazz trumpet player, he could also play many other instruments. In a career as a versatile performer on stage, television and film, he became best known to British television viewers as long-running presenter of the children's series Record Breakers.

== Early career ==
Castle was born in Scholes, near Holmfirth, West Riding of Yorkshire. The son of a railwayman, he was a tap dancer from an early age and trained at Nora Bray's school of dance with Audrey Spencer, who later ran a big dance school, and after leaving Holme Valley Grammar School (now Honley High School) he started his career as an entertainer in an amateur concert party. As a young performer in the 1950s, he lived in Cleveleys near Blackpool and appeared there at the local Queen's Theatre, turning professional in 1953 as a stooge for Jimmy Clitheroe and Jimmy James. By 1958, he was appearing at the Royal Variety Show where he was invited to appear on the Royal Command Performance (1958) and received wide acclaim, being hailed as the hit of the show. This was also where he met lifelong friend, Harry Secombe, with whom he went on to work on numerous occasions

As a singer, he released one charting single in 1960, the Christmas song "Little White Berry".

== Television and film career ==
Castle guest-starred in an episode of the Morecambe and Wise series Two of a Kind, which aired on 3 August 1963. He received billing twice for his guest appearances in both halves of the show. In 1965, Castle starred with Peter Cushing in the film Dr. Who and the Daleks, the first of two cinematic spin-offs from the BBC television series. He played the role of Dr. Who's first male assistant, Ian Chesterton, and was cast to perform the role more comedically than it had been played by William Russell in the equivalent serial. He appeared in Dr. Terror's House of Horrors as a jazz musician.

Castle also appeared in Carry On Up the Khyber in 1968 and in the TV musical Pickwick for the BBC in 1969. In the 1990s, he appeared again in Pickwick, touring the country, starring alongside Sir Harry Secombe, and the show was recorded again. (Secombe had starred in the original West End production in 1963.) In 1973, Castle teamed up with the comedy actor Ronnie Barker in an original one-off called "Another Fine Mess" (an episode from Barker's series Seven of One). Barker was one of Castle's best friends, and paid tribute to their work together shortly after Castle's death.

In 1967 and 1968, Castle co-starred with Jimmy Edwards in the London West End run of the comedy farce show Big Bad Mouse when Eric Sykes had to withdraw because of illness. The show was resident at the Shaftesbury Theatre and, being loosely scripted, it offered both Edwards and Castle the chance to freely ad-lib and generally break the fourth wall with the audience, Castle breaking into trumpet performances while Edwards walked into a front stall seat to read a newspaper, tap dancing and firing ping-pong balls into the stalls. He also once stood in for Bruce Forsyth hosting The Generation Game in 1975 while Forsyth was ill. He made many appearances on BBC television's long running variety show The Good Old Days, making use of his multi instrumental and performing skills. In 1988, Castle presented and performed in the Anglia Television series Marching as to War, which traced and re-enacted the early history of The Salvation Army.

=== Record Breakers ===
In 1972, he first presented Record Breakers, a children's show, and he remained host for over 20 years. He recorded the theme song "Dedication" for the show himself, and usually performed it live over the closing credits. While presenting the show he broke nine world records himself, including:

- Fastest tap-dance 1,440 taps per minute – 24 taps per second, set on 14 January 1973.
- Longest wing walk – 3 hours, 23 minutes.
- Playing the same tune on 43 different instruments in four minutes.
- On 2 November 1985, the Daily Mirror reported that "Twinkle-toed Roy Castle has the world at his feet...the millionth time in 24 hours. This was the moment when he tap-danced his way to a new record and raised £1 million for charity. The comedian, host of TV's Record Breakers, averaged nearly twelve steps a second during the sponsored feat in London. Roy, 53, had already qualified as the world's fastest tap-dancer."

He was a host of the show until a few months before his death in 1994, alongside Norris and (until his murder in 1975) Ross McWhirter, Fiona Kennedy and Cheryl Baker. From then on, hosting was taken over by Baker and former athlete Kriss Akabusi. It continued until 2001, making it one of Britain's longest-running shows.

== Singing career ==
Between 1958 and 1969, Castle recorded three LPs. One of these, Songs for a Rainy Day was recorded in 1966 for the Columbia label and was reissued in the UK on CD by EMI Gold, re-titled Isn't This a Lovely Day in 2005. The record features twelve songs with rain as the theme. British jazz players of the day Gordon Beck (piano), Jeff Clyne (bass), Leon Calvert (flugelhorn), Ike Isaacs (guitar), Ray Swinfield (flute) and Al Newman (saxophone) played on the record and it features jazz arrangements by Victor Graham covering a variety of styles such as big band, ("Pennies From Heaven", "Stormy Weather"), ballads ("February Brings The Rain", "Here's That Rainy Day", "Soon It's Gonna Rain") and bossa novas ("Everytime It Rains", "The Gentle Rain").

Castle's recording career also included the spoken word. In 1978, for the Scripture Union Label, he recorded eight Bible parables, released on side 1 of the LP Castle on Luke Street, (SU0806), from the 'Luke Street' books, by David Lewis. Side 2 was spoken by Kenneth Williams, Dora Bryan, Derek Nimmo, and Thora Hird, who narrated one story each.

== Personal life ==
Castle married dancer Fiona Dickson on 29 July 1963 with Harry Secombe acting as best man. They had been introduced to each other by Eric Morecambe. Both Castle and his wife were committed Christians and they regularly attended the Baptist church near their home. They had four children. Their youngest son, Ben Castle (born 1973), is a jazz saxophonist who has played with a wide range of artists, including Jamie Cullum, Carleen Anderson, Beth Rowley, Marillion and Radiohead, and performed on film soundtracks.

Castle was a football fan and supported Liverpool. Fewer than six months before his death he attended the Liverpool–Everton derby match at Anfield on 13 March 1994 and stood on the Spion Kop terrace. He had also been in the crowd at Liverpool's FA Cup final victory over Sunderland in May 1992, shortly after he was first found to have cancer. At that time, Ronnie Barker paid tribute to him, referring to their portrayal of characters that bore a strong resemblance to Laurel and Hardy in Another Fine Mess.

On 31 December 1992, Castle was awarded the OBE in the 1993 New Year Honours.

== Illness and death ==
Castle was diagnosed with lung cancer in early 1992, and was told that his chances of recovery were slim and that it was unlikely that he would live for more than six months. He underwent chemotherapy and radiotherapy and went into remission later that year. A non-smoker, he blamed his illness on passive smoking during his years of playing the trumpet in smoky jazz clubs. On 26 November 1993, Castle announced that his illness had returned, and underwent a second round of treatment. Over the spring and summer of 1994, in spite of his deteriorating health, he carried out the high-profile Tour of Hope to raise funds for the erection of the building that would become the Roy Castle Lung Cancer Foundation, which is the only British charity dedicated solely to defeating lung cancer.

During and shortly after Castle's illness, many smoke-free restaurants and cafes were awarded the Roy Castle Clean Air Award to denote their adherence to a smoke-free regime (which at that time was voluntary).

His final contribution to Record Breakers was aired at the conclusion of the 1993 series, although the programme continued until 2001.

He died at his home in Gerrards Cross, Buckinghamshire, on the morning of 2 September 1994, two days after his 62nd birthday. A week before his death he was made a freeman of the City of Liverpool.

His funeral service took place on 8 September 1994 in Amersham. Present at the funeral service along with his family were Harry Secombe, Bruce Forsyth, Cliff Richard, and John Mills. A memorial service at Liverpool Cathedral was held on 20 October 1994.

== Legacy ==
His widow Fiona worked with the charity after her husband's death, and campaigned for the British smoking ban, which came into effect in Northern Ireland in 2004, Scotland in 2006, and England and Wales in 2007, banning smoking in virtually all enclosed public places.

== Works ==
| Year | Title | Publisher | ISBN |
|---|---|---|---|
| 1986 | Roy Castle on Tap: His Unique Tap Dancing Course | Newton Abbot, UK / North Pomfret, VT: David & Charles | 9780715388693 |
| 1988 | Jogging the Memories: Confessions of a Fitness Freak | London: W.H. Allen | 9780491031677 |
| 1994 | Roy Castle | London: BBC Enterprises | 9780563390121 |
| 1995 | Now and Then: An Autobiography | London: Pan | 9780330341936 |

== Filmography ==
| Year | Title | Role | Notes |
|---|---|---|---|
| 1960 | Sink the Bismarck! | Seaman on Prince of Wales | Uncredited |
| 1960 | Light up the Skies | Private Smith | Uncredited |
| 1965 | Dr. Terror's House of Horrors | Biff Bailey | (segment "Voodoo") |
| 1965 | Dr. Who and the Daleks | Ian Chesterton | |
| 1966 | Alice Through the Looking Glass | Lester the Jester | |
| 1967 | The Plank | Delivery Man with boxes (Wilfred Bavistock) | |
| 1968 | Carry On Up the Khyber | Capt. Keene | |
| 1969 | Pickwick | Sam Weller | |
| 1975 | Legend of the Werewolf | Photographer | |
