= Little Dreamer (Beth Rowley album) =

Studio album by Beth Rowley
- Released: 19 May 2008
- Genre: R&B, Soul
- Length: 39:52
- Label: Blue Thumb
- Producer: Steve Power, Kevin Bacon, Jonathan Quarmby

Beth Rowley chronology
| Violets EP (2007) | Little Dreamer (2008) | Gota Fría (2018) |

Singles from Little Dreamer
- 1. "Oh My Life" Released: 3 March 2008; 2. "So Sublime" Released: 12 May 2008

Little Dreamer is the first full studio album by English singer-songwriter Beth Rowley. It was released on 19 May 2008, in the UK and the day after in North America. The album was co-written by Jazz saxophonist Ben Castle who is well known for his work with Jamie Cullum. The album debuted at number six in the UK Albums Chart.

== Track listing ==
1. "Nobody's Fault but Mine" (Traditional)
2. "Sweet Hours" (Ben Castle, Beth Rowley)
3. "So Sublime" (Rod Bowkett, Beth Rowley)
4. "I Shall Be Released" (Bob Dylan)
5. "Only One Cloud" (Ben Castle, Beth Rowley)
6. "When the Rains Came" (Jim Crawford)
7. "Oh My Life" (Ben Castle, Beth Rowley, Paul Pilot)
8. "Angel Flying Too Close to the Ground" (featuring Duke Special) (Willie Nelson)
9. "Almost Persuaded" (Billy Sherrill, Glenn Sutton)
10. "You Never Called Me Tonight" (Ben Castle, Beth Rowley)
11. "Beautiful Tomorrow" (Traditional)
12. "Be My Baby" (download only)
