= Ocean Drive (album) =

Studio album by Lighthouse Family
- Released: 1 September 1995 (UK); 4 March 1996 (UK re-release)
- Recorded: Late 1993 – early 1995
- Genre: Pop; easy listening; soul
- Length: 42:17
- Label: Wildcard; Polydor
- Producer: Mike Peden

Lighthouse Family chronology
Ocean Drive (1995)	Postcards from Heaven (1997)

Singles from Ocean Drive
- 1. "Lifted" Released: 22 May 1995; 2. "Ocean Drive" Released: 9 October 1995; 3. "Lifted (re-release)" Released: 5 February 1996; 4. "Ocean Drive (re-release)" Released: 27 May 1996; 5. "Goodbye Heartbreak" Released: 16 September 1996; 6. "Loving Every Minute" Released: 19 November 1996

Professional ratings
Review scores
Source	Rating
AllMusic	4/5 stars
Music Week	3/5 stars
Smash Hits	2/5 stars

Ocean Drive is the debut album by British musical duo Lighthouse Family, released in 1995 on Wildcard / Polydor Records. The album produced the UK top 10 hit "Lifted" (the most-played single on radio nationally during the first quarter of 1996) and UK top 20 hits "Ocean Drive", "Goodbye Heartbreak" and "Loving Every Minute". The album spent 175 weeks on the UK Albums Chart and achieved 6 times Platinum sales of 1.8 million copies. As of 2022, it was the highest-selling debut album in North East England since records began in 1956.

== Track listing ==
No.	Title	Writer(s)	Producer(s)	Length
1.	"Lifted"	Tunde Baiyewu; Paul Tucker; Martin Brammer	Mike Peden	4:31
2.	"Heavenly"	Baiyewu; Tucker; Tim Kellett	Peden	3:47
3.	"Loving Every Minute"	Baiyewu; Tucker; Brammer; Shaun Ward	Peden	4:10
4.	"Ocean Drive"	Tucker	Peden	3:48
5.	"The Way You Are"	Baiyewu; Tucker; Tim Laws	Peden	5:01
6.	"Keep Remembering"	Baiyewu; Tucker; Alan Glass; Norman Giscombe Jr.	Peden	4:01
7.	"Sweetest Operator"	Baiyewu; Tucker; Kellett	Peden	4:03
8.	"What Could Be Better"	Baiyewu; Tucker; Glass; Giscombe Jr.	Peden	3:57
9.	"Beautiful Night"	Baiyewu; Tucker	Peden	4:48
10.	"Goodbye Heartbreak"	Baiyewu; Tucker; Kellett	Peden	4:11

Ocean Drive – Brazilian edition
No.	Title	Writer(s)	Producer(s)	Length
11.	"Lifted" (Linslee Extended Mix)	Baiyewu; Tucker; Brammer	Linslee	4:00
12.	"Ocean Drive" (Linslee R&B Mix)	Tucker	Linslee	3:59
13.	"Goodbye Heartbreak" (Linslee Main Mix)	Baiyewu; Tucker; Kellett	Linslee	5:16
14.	"Loving Every Minute" (Cutfather & Joe Mix)	Baiyewu; Tucker; Brammer; Ward	Cutfather & Joe	4:16

Ocean Drive – Japanese edition
No.	Title	Writer(s)	Producer(s)	Length
11.	"Absolutely Everything"	Baiyewu; Tucker	Peden	3:57

== Personnel ==
=== Musicians ===
- Tunde Baiyewu – lead and backing vocals
- Dave Brewis – guitar
- Rupert Brown – drums
- Danny Cummings – percussion
- Steven Dante – backing vocals
- Simon Eyre – guitar
- David Grant – backing vocals
- Lain Gray – backing vocals
- Tee Green – backing vocals
- Clive Griffin – backing vocals
- Heard But Not Seen – backing vocals
- Lawrence Johnson – backing vocals
- Tim Kellett – flugelhorn, trumpet
- The London Session Orchestra – strings
- Frank Ricotti – vibraphone
- Philip Todd – bass, brass, flute
- Paul Tucker – keyboards
- Pete Wingfield – piano
- Gavyn Wright – violin

=== Technical ===
- Paul Max Bloom – assistant engineer
- Phil Bodger – mixing
- Bernie Grundman – mastering
- Martin Hayles – engineer
- Nick Ingman – string arrangements
- Lighthouse Family – arranger
- Mike Peden – arranger, mixing, producer
- Paul Tucker – keyboards
- Norman Watson – photography
- Mel Wesson – programming

== Charts ==
=== Weekly charts ===
Chart (1995–1997)	Peak position
German Albums (Offizielle Top 100)	26
Scottish Albums (OCC)	5
UK Albums (OCC)	3

=== Year-end charts ===
Chart (1996)	Position
German Albums (Offizielle Top 100)	97
UK Albums (OCC)	13
Chart (1997)	Position
UK Albums (OCC)	11
Chart (1998)	Position
UK Albums (OCC)	53

== Certifications ==
Region	Certification	Certified units/sales
United Kingdom (BPI)	6× Platinum	1,800,000^{^}
^{^} Shipments figures based on certification alone.
