= Run (Lighthouse Family song) =

2002 single by Lighthouse Family

Single by Lighthouse Family

from the album Whatever Gets You Through the Day
- Released: 25 February 2002
- Studio: The Beach; Olympic (London); AIR (London)
- Length: 3:40
- Label: Wildcard; Polydor
- Songwriter(s): Paul Tucker
- Producer(s): Kevin Bacon; Jonathan Quarmby

Lighthouse Family singles chronology
"(I Wish I Knew How It Would Feel to Be) Free/One" (2001)	"Run" (2002)	"Happy" (2002)

Alternative cover

"Run" is a song by British musical duo Lighthouse Family, released as the second single from their third studio album, Whatever Gets You Through the Day (2001). The song was produced by Kevin Bacon and Jonathan Quarmby. It was released on 25 February 2002 and reached the top 30 in the United Kingdom as well as number two in the Czech Republic.

== Chart performance ==
After the release of "Run" in the United Kingdom, it reached number 30 on the UK Singles Chart and stayed in the charts for three weeks. In Switzerland and Austria, "Run" reached numbers 71 and 75, respectively. In the Czech Republic, the song peaked at number two.

== Track listings ==
- UK CD1
1. "Run" (radio edit) — 3:40
2. "Run" (Ernest Saint Laurent Mix) — 6:25
3. "Run" (Agent Sumo Mix) — 9:20
4. "Run" (video)
- UK CD2
1. "Run" (radio edit) — 3:40
2. "(I Wish I Knew How It Would Feel to Be) Free/One" (Mutiny Vocal Mix) — 7:10
3. "(I Wish I Knew How it Would Feel to Be) Free/One" (Brother Brown Main Mix) — 8:06
- UK cassette single and European CD single
1. "Run" (radio edit) — 3:40
2. "Run" (D'Influence vocal mix) — 4:55
- Australian CD single
1. "Run" (radio edit) — 3:40
2. "Run" (D'Influence vocal mix) — 4:55
3. "Wish" (acoustic version) — 5:09
4. "Run" (CD ROM video)

== Charts ==
Chart (2002)	Peak position
Australia (ARIA)	138
Austria (Ö3 Austria Top 40)	75
Czech Republic (IFPI)	2
Scotland (OCC)	38
Switzerland (Schweizer Hitparade)	71
UK Singles (OCC)	30
