= The Orange Lights =

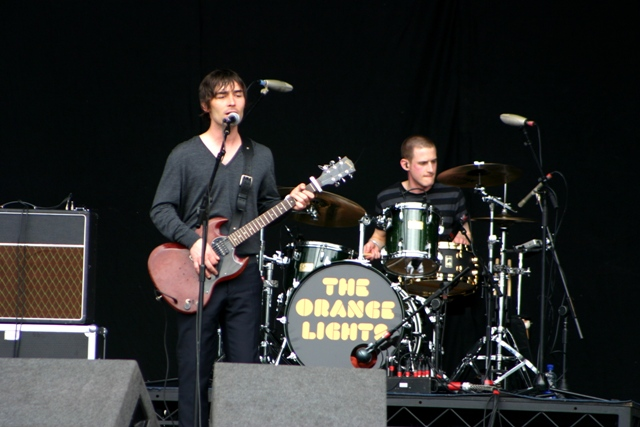
- The Orange Lights in 2007

Background information
- Origin: Newcastle upon Tyne, England
- Genres: Rock, indie rock, dream pop, downtempo
- Years active: 2004–2007
- Labels: Warner, Blackbird
- Members: Jason ("Jay") Hart; Ewan Warden; Chris Gittins; Alex Lucas; Paul Tucker

The Orange Lights are a downtempo/indie/rock band from Newcastle upon Tyne, England.

The group's vocalist is Jason ("Jay") Hart, former guitarist in Jason Pierce's band Spiritualized. Co-founder of the Orange Lights is Newcastle-based keyboard player and songwriter Paul Tucker, who is also one half of pop/soul duo Lighthouse Family.

Their debut album, Life Is Still Beautiful, was released in 2007 on Blackbird Records and was produced by Ken Nelson and Chris Potter, and mixed by Chris Lord-Alge.
