= Goodbye Heartbreak =

1996 single by Lighthouse Family

Single by Lighthouse Family

from the album Ocean Drive
- Released: 9 September 1996
- Length: 4:11
- Label: Wildcard; Polydor
- Songwriters: Paul Tucker; Tunde Baiyewu; Tim Kellett
- Producer: Mike Peden

Lighthouse Family singles chronology
"Ocean Drive" (1995)	"Goodbye Heartbreak" (1996)	"Loving Every Minute" (1996)

Music video
- "Goodbye Heartbreak" on YouTube

"Goodbye Heartbreak" is a song by British musical duo Lighthouse Family, written by the duo along with former Simply Red member Tim Kellett. It was included on Lighthouse Family's debut studio album, Ocean Drive (1996), and was released as its third single on 9 September 1996 by Wildcard and Polydor Records. Produced by Mike Peden, the song became a top-20 hit in the United Kingdom.

== Chart performance ==
After the release of "Goodbye Heartbreak", the single reached number 14 on the UK Singles Chart, giving Lighthouse Family their third successive top-20 hit. The song stayed on the UK Singles Chart for six weeks. "Goodbye Heartbreak" also reached number 86 in Germany and appeared on the Eurochart Hot 100, peaking at number 64 in October 1996.

== Critical reception ==
Ralph Tee from Music Week's RM Dance Update stated that the duo "return with a third single which possesses all the characteristics of the duo's funky-based guitar band style", adding that "this sounds like another hit to me."

== Track listings ==
- UK CD1
1. "Goodbye Heartbreak" (Phil Bodger Mix)
2. "Goodbye Heartbreak" (Linslee Main Mix)
3. "Ocean Drive" (Mindspell's Miami Beach Experience—radio mix)
- UK CD2
1. "Goodbye Heartbreak" (Phil Bodger Mix)
2. "Goodbye Heartbreak" (acoustic)
3. "Ocean Drive" (acoustic)
- UK cassette single
1. "Goodbye Heartbreak" (Phil Bodger Mix)
2. "Goodbye Heartbreak" (Linslee Main Mix)

== Charts ==
=== Weekly charts ===
Chart (1996)	Peak position
Europe (Eurochart Hot 100)	64
Europe (European Dance Radio)	5
Germany (GfK)	86
Scottish Singles Sales (Official Charts)	26
UK Singles (Official Charts)	14
UK Hip Hop/R&B (Official Charts)	3

=== Year-end charts ===
Chart (1996)	Position
UK Airplay (Music Week)	48
