= Lost in Space (Lighthouse Family song) =

1998 single by Lighthouse Family

Single by Lighthouse Family

from the album Postcards from Heaven
- Released: 15 June 1998
- Studio: Miraval (France); Sarm West (London)
- Length: 5:23 (album version); 4:10 (radio edit)
- Label: Polydor; Wildcard
- Songwriter: Paul Tucker
- Producers: Paul Tucker; Tim Laws

Lighthouse Family singles chronology
"High" (1997)	"Lost in Space" (1998)	"Question of Faith" (1998)

"Lost in Space" is a song by the Lighthouse Family, released as the third single from their second album, Postcards from Heaven (1997). Produced by Mike Peden, the song was released in June 1998 and reached the top 10 in the United Kingdom, peaking at number six on the UK singles chart.

== Music video ==
The "Lost in Space" music video was directed by Andrew Douglas and edited by Tim Thornton-Allan at Marshall Street Editors. It opens with the band in Rio de Janeiro, with prominent images of the Christ the Redeemer statue; at the end, they return to England, where a long panning shot of the then-recently completed Angel of the North sculpture (which is also seen on the single cover) closes the video.

== Track listings ==
- UK CD1
1. "Lost in Space" (main mix) – 5:23
2. "Lost in Space" (Itaal Shur's Full mix) – 5:07
3. "Lost in Space" (Tuff Jam's Classic Garage main mix) – 6:41
4. "Lost in Space" (Lost Man vocal mix) – 7:41
- UK CD2
1. "Lost in Space" (main mix) – 5:23
2. "High" (acoustic live at the Royal Albert Hall) – 4:09
3. "Raincloud" (Cuca's radio edit) – 3:49
4. "High" (Boris Dlugosch Big club mix) – 6:10
- UK cassette
1. "Lost in Space" (main mix) – 5:23
2. "Lost in Space" (Itaal Shur's Full mix) – 5:07
- European CD
1. "Lost in Space" (main mix) – 5:23
2. "Raincloud" (Cuca's radio edit) – 3:49
3. "Question of Faith" (Faithful club mix) – 7:50

== Charts ==
Chart (1998)	Peak position
Europe (Eurochart Hot 100)	39
Ireland (IRMA)	14
Scotland Singles (OCC)	9
UK Singles (OCC)	6
UK Hip Hop/R&B (OCC)	2

=== Year-end charts ===
Chart (1998)	Position
UK Singles (OCC)	119

== Certifications ==
Region	Certification	Certified units/sales
United Kingdom (BPI)	Silver	200,000^{‡}
^{‡} Sales+streaming figures based on certification alone.
