= Martin Brammer =

English musician and producer (born 1957)

- Born: 13 May 1957 (age 69); Seaham, County Durham, England
- Occupations: Singer; songwriter; composer; record producer
- Years active: 1982–present
- Children: Salma; Ella
- Musical career
- Genres: Rock; pop
- Instrument: Vocals

Martin Brammer (born 13 May 1957) is an English singer, songwriter, composer and record producer. He is best known as the lead vocalist and primary lyricist of the pop trio Kane Gang. Brammer later developed his songwriting abilities to pen many successful tracks for a variety of notable musicians.

Brammer has been nominated for an Ivor Novello Award, and has been involved in the making of records that have sold over 20 million copies worldwide. He was the manager of the British punk rock band Vant.

== Career ==
Brammer was born in Seaham, County Durham, England. Part of a trio of local North East musicians, Brammer was a founding member of the Kane Gang, which started in late 1982. Brammer co-wrote their smooth ballad "Closest Thing to Heaven", a UK top 20 chart hit in 1984. He also co-wrote other chart successes for them, including "Smalltown Creed" (1984), "Gun Law" (1985) and "Motortown" (1987). Kane Gang broke up in 1991.

Brammer then continued his career as a songwriter to the present day. Songs he has written or co-written have been recorded by Tina Turner, James Morrison, Marco Mengoni, Josh Kumra, James Bay, Olly Murs, Nolwenn Leroy, Julian Velard, Melanie C, Urszula, Mr Hudson, Jack McManus, Beverley Knight, Rachel Stevens, Nick Carter, Lighthouse Family, Roland Gift, Sheena Easton, Mark Owen, Reigan Derry, Foxes and Stevie McCrorie. In addition, Brammer has contributed as record producer on various albums including Good Things Come to Those Who Don't Wait (Josh Kumra); Olly Murs and In Case You Didn't Know (Olly Murs); plus Now or Never (Nick Carter).

He also sang backing vocals on a 1994 album by Opus III (Guru Mother).

Brammer has his own recording studio in which he both writes and records, and favours using microphones manufactured by sE Electronics. Brammer's most recent work includes writing material for John Newman, Ella Eyre, Joel Compass, Karen Harding and Luke Friend.

== Personal life ==
Brammer has an ex-wife, Alia, and two daughters, Salma and Ella. He told BBC Radio 2 that he does not employ a manager.

== Songwriting credits ==
Apart from those written for Kane Gang, Brammer's songwriting credits include:

Year	Musician	Song(s)	Album
1991	Sheena Easton	"Time Bomb"	What Comes Naturally
1995	Lighthouse Family	"Lifted" "Loving Every Minute"	Ocean Drive
1996	Mark Owen	"Child" "Are You With Me"	Green Man
1997	Lighthouse Family	"Raincloud"	Postcards from Heaven
2002	Roland Gift	"Flown"	Roland Gift
2002	Nick Carter	"My Confession" "Is It Saturday Yet?"	Now or Never
2003	Rachel Stevens	"Funky Dory"	Funky Dory
2004	Tina Turner	"Open Arms"	All the Best
2007	Beverley Knight	"Everytime You See Me Smile" "Why Me, Why You, Why Now" "Tell Me I'm Wrong" "Trade It Up"	Music City Soul
2007	James Morrison	"Undiscovered" "The Pieces Don't Fit Anymore"	Undiscovered
2008	Jack McManus	"Bang on the Piano" "You Can Make It Happen" "She's Gone"	Either Side of Midnight
2008	James Morrison	"If You Don't Wanna Love Me" "Fix the World Up for You" " "Love Is Hard"	Songs for You, Truths for Me
2009	Mr Hudson	"Stiff Upper Lip"	Straight No Chaser
2010	Urszula	"Skacze Na Dach"	Dziś już wiem
2010	Olly Murs	"Busy" "I Blame Hollywood"	Olly Murs
2011	Olly Murs	"Oh My Goodness" "I've Tried Everything" "I Need You Now"	In Case You Didn't Know
2011	Julian Velard	""Love Again for the First Time"	Mr. Saturday Night
2011	James Morrison	"I Won't Let You Go" "6 Weeks" "Say Something Now" "Beautiful Life"	The Awakening
2011	Melanie C	"Stupid Game"	The Sea
2012	Nolwenn Leroy	"Limitless"	Ô Filles de l'Eau
2013	Josh Kumra	"The Answer" "Reckless Love" "Keep on Walking" "Lost Again"	Good Things Come to Those Who Don't Wait
2013	James Bay	"Clocks Go Forward"	The Dark of the Morning (EP)
2013	Marco Mengoni	"Evitiamoci (La Soluzione)"	prontoacorrere
2013	Sarah & Pietro	"Slow Lightning"	Dream Team
2014	Reigan Derry	"All of the Pieces"	All of the Pieces (EP)
2015	James Morrison	"Reach Out" "Just Like a Child"	Higher Than Here
2016	Foxes	"Amazing"	All I Need
2016	Ronan Keating	"Time of My Life"	Time of My Life
2016	Bobby Bazini	"Summer Is Gone"	Summer Is Gone
2016	The Shires	"My Universe"	My Universe
2016	Stevie McCrorie	"Take Our Time"	Big World
2018	Maty Noyes	"Perspective"	Love Songs from a Lolita
2019	Zucchero Fornaciari	"Freedom" "My Freedom"	D.O.C.
2019	James Morrison	"Ruins"	You're Stronger Than You Know
2019	Hollow Coves	"Beauty in the Light"	Moments
2020	James Bay	"Clocks Go Forward"	All Up in My Feels (EP)
2021	Saint Etienne	"Fonteyn"	I've Been Trying to Tell You
