= Whatever Gets You Through the Day =

Studio album by Lighthouse Family
- Released: 19 November 2001 (UK)
- Recorded: January–October 2001
- Genre: Pop; easy listening; soul
- Length: 47:52
- Label: Wildcard; Polydor
- Producer: Kevin Bacon; Jonathan Quarmby

Lighthouse Family chronology
Postcards from Heaven (1997)	Whatever Gets You Through the Day (2001)	Greatest Hits (2002)

Singles from Whatever Gets You Through the Day
- 1. "(I Wish I Knew How It Would Feel to Be) Free/One" Released: 12 November 2001; 2. "Run" Released: 25 February 2002; 3. "Happy" Released: 24 June 2002

Professional ratings
Review scores
Source	Rating
AllMusic	3.5/5 stars
musicOMH	(favorable)

Whatever Gets You Through the Day is the third studio album released by UK duo Lighthouse Family in November 2001 on Wildcard / Polydor. The album produced the singles "(I Wish I Knew How It Would Feel to Be) Free / One", "Run" and "Happy". It reached Platinum status.

== Track listing ==
No.	Title	Writer(s)	Producer(s)	Length
1.	"Run"	Paul Tucker; George Morton	Kevin Bacon; Jonathan Quarmby	4:01
2.	"Happy"	Tucker	Bacon; Quarmby	4:35
3.	"(I Wish I Knew How It Would Feel to Be) Free/One" (Billy Taylor/U2 Cover)	Billy Taylor; Dick Dallas; Paul Hewson; Dave Evans; Larry Mullen; Adam Clayton	Bacon; Quarmby	5:16
4.	"End of the Sky"	Tucker	Bacon; Quarmby	5:57
5.	"Life's a Dream"	Tucker	Bacon; Quarmby	4:56
6.	"It's a Beautiful Day"	Tucker; Tim Laws	Bacon; Quarmby	4:51
7.	"You're a Star"	Tucker	Bacon; Quarmby	4:35
8.	"You Always Want What You Haven't Got"	Tucker	Bacon; Quarmby	3:52
9.	"Wish"	Tucker	Bacon; Quarmby	5:09
10.	"Whatever Gets You Through the Day"	Tucker; Laws	Bacon; Quarmby	4:40

Whatever Gets You Through the Day – Special edition bonus track
No.	Title	Writer(s)	Producer(s)	Length
11.	"Wish" (Downtempo Version)	Tucker	Bacon; Quarmby	4:41

== Charts ==
=== Weekly charts ===
Chart (2001–02)	Peak position
Australian Albums (ARIA)	182
Austrian Albums (Ö3 Austria)	21
Dutch Albums (Album Top 100)	88
German Albums (Offizielle Top 100)	3
Irish Albums (IRMA)	30
Italian Albums (FIMI)	25
Scottish Albums (OCC)	9
Swiss Albums (Schweizer Hitparade)	29
UK Albums (OCC)	7

=== Year-end charts ===
Chart (2001)	Position
UK Albums (OCC)	57

Chart (2002)	Position
Austrian Albums (Ö3 Austria)	75
German Albums (Offizielle Top 100)	27
UK Albums (OCC)	140

== Certifications ==
Certifications for Whatever Gets You Through The Day
Region	Certification	Certified units/sales
Germany (BVMI)	Platinum	300,000^{^}
Spain (Promusicae)	Gold	50,000^{^}
Switzerland (IFPI Switzerland)	Gold	20,000^{^}
United Kingdom (BPI)	Platinum	300,000^{^}
^{^} Shipments figures based on certification alone.
