= Roy Castle Lung Cancer Foundation =

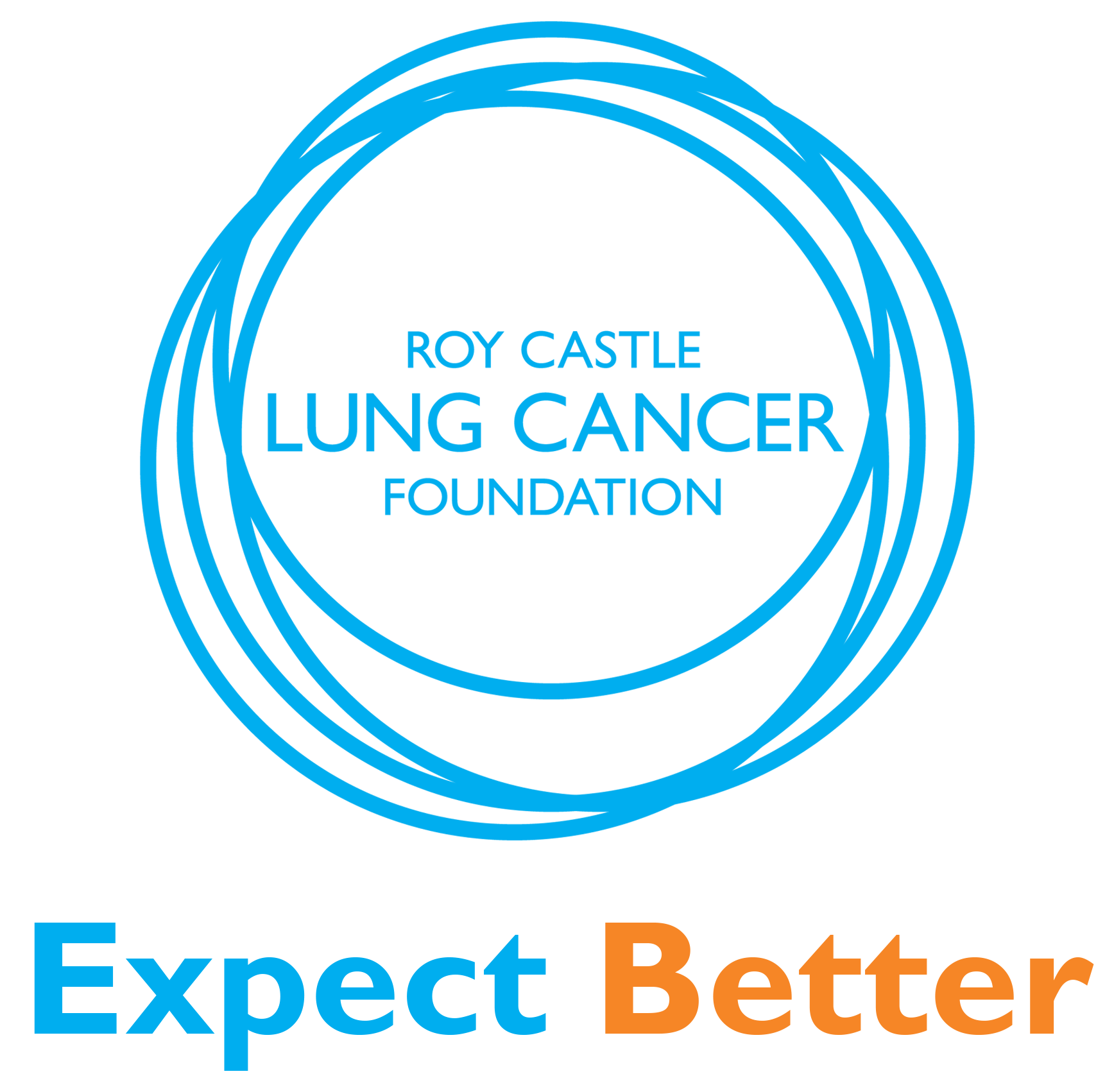
- Founded: 1990
- Type: International organization
- Purpose: Lung cancer
- Location: Liverpool, England, UK
- Region served: United Kingdom
- Key people: Paula Chadwick, Chief Executive
- Website: roycastle.org

Roy Castle Lung Cancer Foundation is a registered charity in the United Kingdom which aims to provide help and hope to people affected by lung cancer. Founded in Liverpool in 1990, it is the only UK charity to focus solely on lung cancer care. The charity has a dual focus - saving lives and supporting people affected by lung cancer. It funds lung cancer research, supports the prevention of lung cancer by encouraging and helping people to avoid or quit smoking, and raises general awareness of lung cancer and its symptoms. It also supports lung cancer patients by running support groups, providing information to the NHS, and other measures.

The organisation was founded as the Lung Cancer Fund in 1990 by Professor Ray Donnelly, a thoracic surgeon working in Liverpool, where it provided the first lung cancer support nurse in 1991. In 1993 Donnelly proposed the creation of an international centre for lung cancer research. At this time UK entertainer Roy Castle had been diagnosed with lung cancer, and he agreed to raise £12 million to build, equip and run the new centre. The Lung Cancer Fund was therefore renamed Roy Castle Lung Cancer Foundation. Castle continued fundraising for the charity until his death in September 1994.

The charity has since expanded its operations to include a retail wing operating shops in the Merseyside area. It has funded numerous research projects across UK universities, and provides a research fellowship at the University of Nottingham. In 2011 it raised a total of £2.3 million towards lung cancer prevention and care.

The charity's celebrity supporters include Sir Alex Ferguson, Ricky Gervais, Melanie C, Duncan Bannatyne, Lynda Bellingham, Tricia Penrose, Jenny Frost, Pete Reed, Katherine Grainger, Robert Peston, Robert Powell, Billy Bragg, and Tony Parsons.

== See also ==
- Cancer in the United Kingdom
