= Beth Rowley =

British singer-songwriter (born 1981)

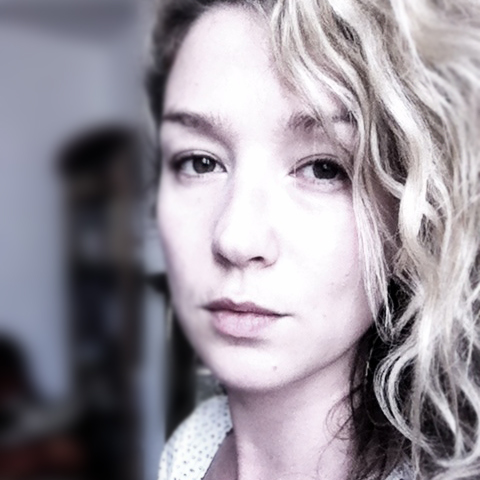

Background information
- Born: Beth Ann Rowley; 10 October 1981 (age 44); Lima, Peru
- Origin: Bristol, England
- Genres: R&B, soul, pop, gospel, jazz
- Occupation: Singer-songwriter
- Years active: 2000–present
- Website: bethrowley.com

Beth Ann Rowley (born 10 October 1981) is an English singer-songwriter.

== Early life ==
Rowley was born in Lima, Peru, to British parents who moved back to Bristol, England, when Rowley was two years old.

== Career ==
=== Early career ===
She was influenced by her family's love for many different musical styles, particularly blues, country, folk, gospel and Latin American music. When aged 16, Rowley formed The Apogee, an original five piece funk/soul/acid jazz group. At age 17, she was spotted at an open mic night in the London entertainment club, Ginglik, in Shepherd's Bush.

Rowley studied music and art at Weston-super-Mare College and in 2003, went on to the Brighton Institute of Modern Music with the particular help and encouragement of soulsinger Carleen Anderson. During her time at the school, Rowley toured with Ronan Keating and Enrique Iglesias, providing backing vocals.

She attended St Mary Redcliffe and Temple School, in Bristol.

=== 2000–present ===
In 2000, Rowley teamed up with jazz saxophonist Ben Castle (son of Roy), well known for his work with Jamie Cullum. She began writing her own material and with Castle's encouragement and assistance she released three EPs, Beth Rowley (2004), Sweet Hours (2006) and Violets (2007). From the Violets EP she released a single entitled, "Nobody's Fault But Mine" which was the iTunes 'Single of the Week' for December 2007.

Rowley has collaborated with other artists and bands, including Crowded House on their Time on Earth album, providing backing vocals for the song "Transit Lounge", and Duke Special, who joined her for a duet on her début album, Little Dreamer.

Rowley's album Little Dreamer was released in the UK on 19 May 2008, and went straight into the UK Albums Chart at number 6. On 4 February 2008, the lead single, "Oh My Life" (released on 3 March 2008) from the forthcoming album was featured as 'BBC Radio 2 Record of the Week'. The second single from the album, "So Sublime", was released on 12 May 2008.

Rowley attended The Edge of Love world premiere on 18 June, which marked the opening of the Edinburgh Film Festival. Based on the life of Welsh poet Dylan Thomas, The Edge of Love opened nationwide from 27 June. Rowley recorded the exclusive track "Careless Talk", as part of the soundtrack to the film.

In 2006, Rowley recorded a song entitled "Too Much Too Late" written by Bristol-based singer/songwriter Steven Reid Williams, in a collaboration featured on the album Corners. In the same year she provided the vocals on Nostalgia77's track "Quiet Dawn" from their album, Everything Under the Sun.

On 22 October 2008, Rowley appeared with Burt Bacharach on the BBC Electric Proms series, singing "Twenty Four Hours from Tulsa".

On 9 January 2009, a short clip of her song "Sweet Hours" was played on UK soap Hollyoaks on E4. On 20 January 2009, Rowley was nominated for a Brit Award in the category for Best British Female Solo Artist.

Rowley featured in the nightclub scene in the 2009 film An Education, directed by Lone Scherfig. Her track "You Got Me Wrapped Around Your Little Finger" is featured prominently in the official movie soundtrack and the Sony Classics promotional website.

On 8 July 2013, Rowley released "Wretched Body", an EP including four songs, as the first of a planned three-piece EP series.

Her performance of the song "I Walk Beside You" is used as the theme song for the 2017 BBC series Strike.

== Personal life ==
Rowley married actor Liam Garrigan on 1 July 2017.

== Touring ==
Rowley has supported various artists on tour including David Gray, Tom Baxter and Duke Special. In March 2008, Rowley performed at the Play.com Live event inside Wembley Stadium, London. On 4 April 2008, Rowley appeared on BBC Radio 2's 'Friday Night is Music Night' performing two tracks with the BBC Concert Orchestra at the Mermaid Theatre, London She has also made guest appearances on 'Top of the Pops', 'Parkinson', This Morning and later, GMTV and The Charlotte Church Show. Rowley started her first headline tour at London's Bush Hall on 16 April 2008. She also made an appearance at the Christian arts festival, Greenbelt, in 2008, though it was not her first time at the festival. On 25 February 2011, Rowley supported Katie Melua in an Eva Cassidy-style duet on a Radio 2 in Concert at the BBC Radio Theatre.

== Discography ==
- 2007: Violets
- 2008: Little Dreamer
- 2013: Wretched Body
- 2018: Gota Fría
- 2022: Pale Jewel Vol 1
- 2024: Pale Jewel Vol 2
