= Raincloud (song) =

1997 single by Lighthouse Family

- UK CD single 1

Single by Lighthouse Family

from the album Postcards from Heaven
- B-side: "From a Desert to a Beach"
- Released: 29 September 1997
- Studio: Miraval (Correns, France); Sarm West (London, UK)
- Genre: Pop
- Length: 4:06
- Label: Wildcard; Polydor
- Songwriter(s): Paul Tucker; Martin Brammer; Tunde Baiyewu
- Producer(s): Mike Peden

Lighthouse Family singles chronology
"Loving Every Minute" (1996)	"Raincloud" (1997)	"High" (1997)

Alternative cover
- UK CD single 2

"Raincloud" is a song by British group Lighthouse Family, released as the duo's first single from their second studio album, Postcards from Heaven (1997). The song was produced by Mike Peden. Released on 29 September 1997, "Raincloud" reached the top 10 on the UK Singles Chart, peaking at No. 6. "From a Desert to a Beach" is included as the B-side on the "Raincloud" single. This track was not included on any of Lighthouse Family's albums apart from their remix album, Relaxed & Remixed (2004).

== Critical reception ==
A reviewer from Music Week rated the song four out of five, adding that it "delivers enough melody, vocal warmth and rhythm to outweigh the Love Is All Around echoes. Set to start the Christmas tills ringing." Chris Finan from the RM Dance Update gave it five out of five, noting that "Paul & Tunde return with something a tad more uptempo than their previous single releases, boosted by a funky D'Influence mix and backed by a more obvious 'Radio Mix'. The distinct vocal is as much at home with the upbeat pace as on the slower material."

== Chart performance ==
"Raincloud" reached No. 6 on the UK Singles Chart in October 1997 and spent seven weeks on the chart. In Australia, the song was released after "High" reached number one there. "Raincloud" peaked at No. 29 on the Australian Singles Chart in November 1998 and remained on the chart for 10 weeks. It also reached to No. 47 on the French Singles Chart in January 1998 and No. 71 on the Dutch Single Top 100 in December 1997. On the Eurochart Hot 100, the single peaked at No. 34 in October 1997.

== Track listings ==
- UK CD1
1. "Raincloud" (7-inch edit)
2. "Raincloud" (D'Influence remix edit)
3. "From a Desert to a Beach"
4. "Raincloud" (Basement Boys Paradox Vocal)
- UK CD2
1. "Raincloud" (7-inch edit)
2. "Raincloud" (Mark!'s Tribal Madness vocal)
3. "Raincloud" (Mark!'s Tribal Madness dub)
4. "Raincloud" (Basement Boys Paradox dub)
- UK cassette single and European CD single
1. "Raincloud" (7-inch edit)
2. "Raincloud" (D'Influence remix edit)
- Australian CD single
1. "Raincloud" (7-inch edit)
2. "Raincloud" (D'Influence remix edit)
3. "From a Desert to a Beach"
4. "Raincloud" (Basement Boys Paradox Vocal)
5. "High" (7-inch edit)

== Charts ==
=== Weekly charts ===
Chart (1997–1999)	Peak position
Australia (ARIA)	29
Belgium (Ultratip Bubbling Under Flanders)	7
Belgium (Ultratop 50 Wallonia)	34
Europe (Eurochart Hot 100)	34
France (SNEP)	47
Germany (GfK)	70
Hungary (Mahasz)	7
Netherlands (Single Top 100)	71
Scotland (OCC)	12
UK Singles (OCC)	6
UK Hip Hop/R&B (OCC)	2

=== Year-end charts ===
Chart (1997)	Position
UK Singles (OCC)	125
