= Jonathan Quarmby =

English record producer

- Born: 20 December 1961 (age 64); Huddersfield, England
- Years active: 1991-present

Jonathan Hugh Quarmby (born 20 December 1961) is an English record producer and songwriter. Born in Huddersfield, England, Quarmby has worked with a range of artists across various genres.

== Early life and education ==
Jonathan Hugh Quarmby was born on 20 December 1961, in Huddersfield, to music teacher Jean, and architect Arthur Quarmby. Arthur Quarmby was a designer, author, thinker, and primarily working in modular plastics and earth-sheltered housing. Jonathan was educated at Holmfirth High School and Pocklington School, before studying architecture at the Sheffield University. With a passion for music, he became part of Sheffield's vibrant music scene, eventually leaving architecture to pursue a music career.

== Professional career ==
=== Sheffield ===
Quarmby began as a keyboard player, performing on Yazz’s album Wanted and touring with the band Floy Joy. His transition to record production began with Barclay artists Fred de Fred. Quarmby then collaborated with Comsat Angels bass player Kevin Bacon at Axis Studio to write and produce Ephraim Lewis's album Skin for Elektra Records. This partnership (Bacon and Quarmby) went on to produce and write in a diverse range of music styles, including: electro as R&S artists Manna, Britpop with the Longpigs, and pop/soul with Light House Family. They received recognition for their contribution to reggae: Finley Quaye (Maverick a Strike) - for which Finley won the ‘Best Male’ Brit Award and Ziggy Marley (Fallen Is Babylon), for which they received the ‘Best Reggae Album’ Grammy award.

=== London - RAK Studios ===
Relocating from Sheffield to London's RAK Studios in 2003, Quarmby and Bacon embarked on music production, including work with Primal Scream, Mew, the Sugababes, David Garrett, Plan B, The Pretenders, Richard Hawley, and Des'ree.

=== AWAL ===
In 2004, they founded the music company, AWAL, with Apple consultant Denzyl Feigelson. AWAL introduced new ideas into online aggregation, with its 30-day agreement and its data tracking and analysis tool, Buzzdeck. With offices in Sheffield and London, the business distributed over 3000 independent artists, including Arctic Monkeys, David Gray, and Madness. In 2012, AWAL was sold to Kobalt (who sold it to Sony in 2021 for $430,000,000). Jonathan, Kevin, and Denzyl were retained by Kobalt for two years.

=== Back to RAK ===
In 2014, Quarmby returned to RAK and focused on songwriting and production. Managed initially by Richard Antwi, he worked with Daley, Mahalia, and Jacob Banks, before achieving success with Benjamin Clementine, whose album At Least For Now won the Mercury Prize in 2015. Quarmby co-wrote, produced, and mixed the album, and the track "Nemesis" is the theme to Apple's drama, 'The Morning Show.’ As a writer, Quarmby collaborated with Lewis Capaldi, on the single Tough, Tiggs Da Author, co-writing, producing, and mixing much of the album Blame It On The Youts; produced Tom Walker's track Just You and I; co-wrote and produced the single and TV show theme by Mika It’s My House; and co-wrote four songs on the album Back From The Edge by James Arthur, including the title track and second single Safe Inside. They also produced half the album "Got It Covered," for Children in Need. He produced and mixed eight tracks on Cian Ducroft's No. 1 Deluxe Album, Victory; co-wrote, produced and mixed 3 Eyes Open for GreenTea Peng - which appears on the album Greenzone 108; co-wrote, produced and mixed the album Child Of Sin by the Dutch artist Kovacs; produced and mixed an acoustic African album with Tiken Jay Fakoli; and produced an album for French singer Olivia Ruiz.

=== Globe Town Records ===
In 2018, Quarmby joined Globe Town Records, a label based in Hoxton, London, and worked there throughout and after the COVID-19 pandemic, with individuals including Tycho Jones, Tom Rasmussen, and Faisal Salah (Facesoul).

== Discography ==
1990s

- Fred De Fred - Treize En Vie - P (1991)
- Ephraim Lewis – Skin - W/P/M (1992)
- Manna – Manna - W/P/M (1994)
- Lightning Seeds – Dizzy Heights - P/M (1996)
- The Longpigs – The Sun Is Often Out - P/M (1996)
- Eagle Eye Cherry – "Save Tonight" single - adP/M (1997)
- Finley Quaye – Maverick a Strike - P/M (1997)
- Ziggy Marley & The Melody Makers – Fallen Is Babylon - P/M (1997)
- Del Amitri – Hatful of Rain - P/M (1998)
- Ian Brown – "Can't See Me" single - P/M (1998)
- The Longpigs – Mobile Home - P/M (1999)
- Audioweb - Audioweb - P/M (1996)
- Koot – Mississippi Soul - P/M (1999)

2000's

- 2001 : Ben Onono – Badagry Beach - P/M
- 2001 : Finley Quaye - Vanguard - P/M
- 2001 : Light House Family – Whatever Gets You Through the Day - P/M
- 2002 : Sugababes – Round Round single - P - No 1 UK
- 2002 : The Pretenders – Loose Screw
- 2003 : Finley Quaye - Much More Than Much Love - P/M
- 2003 : Des'ree – Dream Soldier - P/M
- 2003 : Richard Hawley – Run for Me - P/M
- 2004 : Shaznay Lewis – Open - P/M
- 2004 : The Stands – All Years Leaving - P/M
- 2004 : Oi Va Voi – Laughter Through Tears - P/M
- 2005 : Mew – And the Glass Handed Kites - adP/M
- 2005 : Ben Taylor – Another Run Around the Sun - P/M
- 2005 : Engineers - Home - P/M
- 2005 : Richard Hawley - The Ocean - P/M
- 2006 : The Dualers – Don't Go (single) - P/M
- 2006 : Sophie Solomon – Poison Sweet Madeira - P/M
- 2006 : Primal Scream – Sometimes I feel so Lonely - P/M
- 2006 : Plan B – Mama (Loves a Crackhead) - P/M
- 2007 : Tiken Jah Fakoly – L'Africain - P/M (2007)
- 2007 : David Garrett – Virtuoso
- 2007 : Beth Rowley – Little Dreamer - P/M
- 2007 : David Ford – Songs for the Road - P/M (2007)
- 2008 : Dick Rivers – L'Homme Sans Age - P/M (2008)
- 2008 : Mattafix - Rhythm & Hymns - Tracks - P/M (2008)
- 2009 : Beverley Knight – 100% - P/M (2009)
- 2009 : Netsayi – Monkey's Wedding - W/P/M (2009)
- 2009 : Karima Francis – The Author - P/M (2009)
- 2009 : Oi Va Voi – Travelling the Face of the Globe - P/M (2009)
- 2009 : Beverley Knight - Soul Survivor - P/M (2009)

2010s

- Tony Christie – Now's the Time (Single) - P/M (2011)
- Tiken Jah Fakoli – African Revolution - W/P/M(2010)
- Iwan Rheon - singles P/M (2010)
- Molotov Jukebox - "Bang EP" - P/M (2012)
- Misty Miller – Misty Miller - P/M (2012)
- Son Of Dave - 03 - Album - P/M (2013)
- Iwaan Rheon - Bang BAng - EP - P/M (2013)
- Tiken Jah Fakoli – Derniere Appel - W/P/M (2014)
- Daley – Broken - P/M (2014)
- Jacob Banks – Move With You - P (2014)
- Benjamin Clementine – At Least For Now (2015)
- Gabrielle Aplin – Coming Home - P (2015)
- Tiken Jah Fakoli – Racines - P/M (2015)
- Aura Dione – Love Somebody - P/M (2016)
- Patricia Kaas – Patricia Kaas (2016)
- George Oglivie – October (2016)
- George Oglivie – Foreign Hands (2016)
- James Arthur – Back From The Edge - tracks - (2016) W/VxP. – no.1 UK
- Aura Dione - Can't Steal the Music P/M (2017)
- Light House Family - tracks - Blue Sky In Your Head (2017)
- Thomas David - To Love - Album - W/P/M (2017)
- Hannah Grace - Praise You P/M (2017)
- Leo Stannard - Gravity - P/M (2017)
- Hannah Grace - Oh River P/M (2018)
- Shane Filan - Girl In My Heart - W/P/M (2018)
- Leo Stannard - Home / Five Years Later W/P/M (2018)
- Nikhil - Tracks and singles (2018)
- Dan Owen - Tracks and singles (2018)
- Alex the Astronaut - Waste of Time (2018)
- MIka - It's My House - single - 2018 W/P
- Lewis Capaldi - (2018) Tough W/P
- Jeremy Loops - Critical As Water - tracks - W (2018)
- Jordan Max - Careless - W/P/M (2018)
- Dekel - Hello - Album - W/P/M (2018)
- Tom Walker – Just You And I (2017/9) P/M - no.1 UK
- Áine - Dislocated - W/P/M (2019)
- James Arthur - You (2019) - tracks - P No.2 UK
- Korantemaa - Bitter - W/PM (2019)
- Kawala - Counting The Miles - EP - W/P/M (2019)
- Toby Johnson - Carolina EP - W/P/M (2019)
- MIka - My Name Is Michael Holbrook - track- P (2019)
- Children In Need - Got It Covered - (2019) no1 UK (contested)
- Calling Out - Andreas Moe - W (2019)
- James Morrison - You're Stronger Than You Know (2019)

2020s

- Ward Thomas - An Invitation - P/M (2020)
- Kawala - Heavy In The Morning - W (2020)
- Sody - Reason To Stay - P (2020)
- Janet Devlin - Confessional - Album - W/P/M (2020)
- Amrit Kaur - singles - W/P/M (2020)
- Ward Thomas / Dan Owen - Someone to Someone - W/P/M (2020)
- Tycho Jones - Don't Be Afraid - P/M (2021)
- Toby Johnson - Chaos - EP - W/P/M (2021)
- VC Pines - Smoke Without Fire - W/P (2021)
- Sam Ryder - Sun's Gonna Rise - W (2021)
- Jeremy Loops - Sit Down Love - W/P/M (2021)
- Andrew Lloyd Webber - Far Too Late - single - P/M (2021)
- Tiggs Da Author Blame It On The Youts Album - tracks - W/P/M (2021)
- Jessie James Decker - The Woman I’ve Become - W (2021)
- Albin Lee Meldau - Forget About Us - W/P (2022)
- Tim Gallagher - Growing Pains - P (2022)
- Tim Gallagher - Every Little Word - W/P (2022)
- GreenTea Peng - Three Eyes Open - W/P/M (2022)
- Elouise Alterman - Four In The Morning - W (2022)
- Isaac Stuart - Cut Me Down - W/P/M (2022)
- Jeremy Loops - Postcards - W (2022)
- Maimuna Memon - First Born Child - P (2022)
- Tycho Jones - Clouds - W/P/M (2022)
- Aura Dione - Marry Me - W/P (2022)
- Emmadop - Superstar Album - W/P/M (2022)
- Megan McKenna - Single - Single - W/P/M (2022)
- Tycho Jones - Negative Space - EP W/P/M (2022)
- Caitlyn Scarlet - Forgive Yourself - W/P/M (2023)
- Tom Webber - tracks (2023)
- Talia Roux - Take You With Me - EP - W/P/M (2023)
- The Jordan - Amsterdam - W (2023)
- Lewis Fitzgerald - Our House - P/M (2023)
- Dekel Desert Moon - Album - W/P/M (2023)
- Marlon Roudette - No Water - W/P (2023)
- Kovacs - Child Of Sin - W/P/M (2023)
- Ben Taylor - singles - P/M (2023)
- Iyamah - Chasing Dreams - W/P (2023)
- Tom Webber - The Rak Tracks - W/P/M (2023)
- Jainda - Singles - W/P/M (2023)
- Psykhi - Forest People EP - W/P/M (2023)
- Matthew Mole - Say You'll Be Mine - W (2023)
- Maya Lane - Childish Games EP - W/P/M (2023)
- Tom Rasmussen - Body Building - tracks W/P/M (2023)
- Face Soul - Faith In Me - W/P/M (2023)
- Cian Ducroft - Victory(deluxe) - P/M (2023) - UK #1
- MT Jones - Joy - W/P/M (2026)
