= Ocean Drive (Lighthouse Family song) =

1995 single by Lighthouse Family

- 1995 CD single

Single by Lighthouse Family

from the album Ocean Drive
- Released: 2 October 1995
- Studio: Battery (New York City)
- Length: 3:46
- Label: Wildcard; Polydor
- Songwriter: Paul Tucker
- Producer: Mike Peden

Lighthouse Family singles chronology
"Lifted" (1995)	"Ocean Drive" (1995)	"Goodbye Heartbreak" (1996)

Music video
- "Ocean Drive" on YouTube

Audio sample
- "Ocean Drive": file; help

"Ocean Drive" is a song written and recorded by British musical duo Lighthouse Family for their debut album of the same name (1995). Produced by Mike Peden, the song was released as the second single from the album on 2 October 1995 and reached the top 40 on the UK Singles Chart. The song was re-released, slightly remixed and with new vocals, on 20 May 1996 and reached the top 20 on the UK chart. This version also appeared on the duo's 2002 Greatest Hits album.

== Background and writing ==
The song was written and composed by keyboard-player Paul Tucker and sung by Tunde Baiyewu. The trumpet solo is by Tim Kellett.

== Critical reception ==
James Masterton for Dotmusic described "Ocean Drive" as "a lovely, mellow track that is no less brilliant than the first". A reviewer from Music Week gave the song a score of three out of five, writing, "From this summer's happy British film hit Jack and Sarah comes a track of unconstrained quality." Later, the magazine added, "Mellow vibe with a Tracy Chapman feel to the vocal result in a record that you can imagine radio rightly embracing."

== Track listings ==
- UK CD single (1995)
1. "Ocean Drive" (7-inch)
2. "Ocean Drive" (Linslee R&B mix)
3. "Ocean Drive" (Rokstone dub mix)
4. "Ocean Drive" (Tactica mix)
- UK cassette single (1995)
1. "Ocean Drive" (7-inch)
2. "Ocean Drive" (Linslee 7-inch R&B mix)
- UK CD single (1996)
1. "Ocean Drive" (7-inch radio mix)
2. "Ocean Drive" (Linslee R&B mix)
3. "Ocean Drive" (Linslee '96 mix)
4. "Lifted" (acoustic version)
- UK cassette single (1996)
1. "Ocean Drive" (7-inch radio mix)
2. "Ocean Drive" (Linslee R&B mix)
3. "Ocean Drive" (Linslee '96 mix)

== Charts ==
=== Weekly charts ===
Original release

Chart (1995)	Peak position
Europe (Eurochart Hot 100)	87
Europe (European Dance Radio)	15
Scottish Singles Sales (Official Charts)	55
UK Singles (Official Charts)	34

Re-release

Chart (1996)	Peak position
Europe (Eurochart Hot 100)	40
Europe (European Dance Radio)	6
Germany (GfK)	69
Iceland (Íslenski Listinn Topp 40)	40
Israel (Israeli Singles Chart)	29
Scottish Singles Sales (Official Charts)	10
UK Singles (Official Charts)	11

=== Year end charts ===
Chart (1996)	Position
UK Airplay (Music Week)	11

== Certifications ==
Region	Certification	Certified units/sales
United Kingdom (BPI) Sales since 2004	Platinum	600,000^{‡}
^{‡} Sales+streaming figures based on certification alone.

== Release history ==
Region	Date	Format(s)	Label(s)	Ref.
United Kingdom	2 October 1995	12-inch vinyl; CD; cassette	Wildcard; Polydor	
Australia	16 October 1995	CD; cassette	Wildcard; Polydor	
United Kingdom (re-release)	20 May 1996	12-inch vinyl; CD; cassette	Wildcard; Polydor	
