= (I Wish I Knew How It Would Feel to Be) Free/One =

2001 single by Lighthouse Family

"(I Wish I Knew How It Would Feel To Be) Free/One"

Single by Lighthouse Family

from the album Whatever Gets You Through the Day
- B-side: "You're a Star"; "It's a Beautiful Day"
- Released: 12 November 2001
- Studio: The Beach; Olympic (London); AIR (London)
- Length: 4:26
- Label: Wildcard; Polydor
- Songwriters: Billy Taylor; Dick Dallas; Bono; U2
- Producers: Kevin Bacon; Jonathan Quarmby

Lighthouse Family singles chronology
"Postcard from Heaven" (1998)	"(I Wish I Knew How It Would Feel To Be) Free/One" (2001)	"Run" (2002)

"(I Wish I Knew How It Would Feel to Be) Free/One" is a song by British musical duo Lighthouse Family, released as their first single from their third album, Whatever Gets You Through the Day (2001). The song was originally written by Billy Taylor, with lyrics by Dick Dallas. Best known for its 1967 version by Nina Simone, and as the instrumental theme (performed by the Billy Taylor Trio) to the BBC Film... TV show, this version was produced by Kevin Bacon and Jonathan Quarmby.

Released on 12 November 2001, "(I Wish I Knew How It Would Feel to Be) Free/One" was successful in the United Kingdom, where it reached number six on the UK Singles Chart in November 2001 and stayed on the chart for nine weeks. It also reached number three in Portugal, number nine in Hungary, and number 10 in Germany.

== Content ==
"(I Wish I Knew How It Would Feel to Be) Free/One" is a cover of Billy Taylor's "I Wish I Knew How It Would Feel to Be Free" and also interpolates U2's "One".

== Track listings ==
- UK and Australian CD single
1. "(I Wish I Knew How It Would Feel to Be) Free/One" (single version) – 4:26
2. "You're a Star" – 4:35
3. "(I Wish I Knew How It Would Feel to Be) Free/One" (Phats 'n' Small vocal mix) – 7:34
4. "(I Wish I Knew How It Would Feel to Be) Free/One" (video)
- UK cassette single
1. "(I Wish I Knew How It Would Feel to Be) Free/One" (single version) – 4:26
2. "It's a Beautiful Day" – 4:56
3. "(I Wish I Knew How It Would Feel to Be) Free/One" (Mutiny vocal) – 7:10
- European CD single
1. "(I Wish I Knew How It Would Feel to Be) Free/One" (single version) – 4:26
2. "(I Wish I Knew How It Would Feel to Be) Free/One" (Phats 'n' Small vocal mix) – 7:34

== Charts ==
=== Weekly charts ===
Chart (2001–2002)	Peak position
Australia (ARIA)	92
Austria (Ö3 Austria Top 40)	14
Belgium (Ultratip Bubbling Under Flanders)	12
Europe (Eurochart Hot 100)	17
Germany (GfK)	10
Hungary (Rádiós Top 40)	9
Hungary (Single Top 40)	17
Ireland (IRMA)	26
Italy (FIMI)	22
Netherlands (Single Top 100)	85
Poland Airplay (Music & Media)	2
Portugal (AFP)	3
Romania (Romanian Top 100)	72
Scottish Singles Sales (Official Charts)	6
Spain (Promusicae)	16
Switzerland (Schweizer Hitparade)	26
UK Singles (Official Charts)	6
UK Hip Hop/R&B (Official Charts)	6

=== Year-end charts ===
Chart (2001)	Position
UK Singles (OCC)	169
