= Ben Castle =

British jazz musician (born 1973)

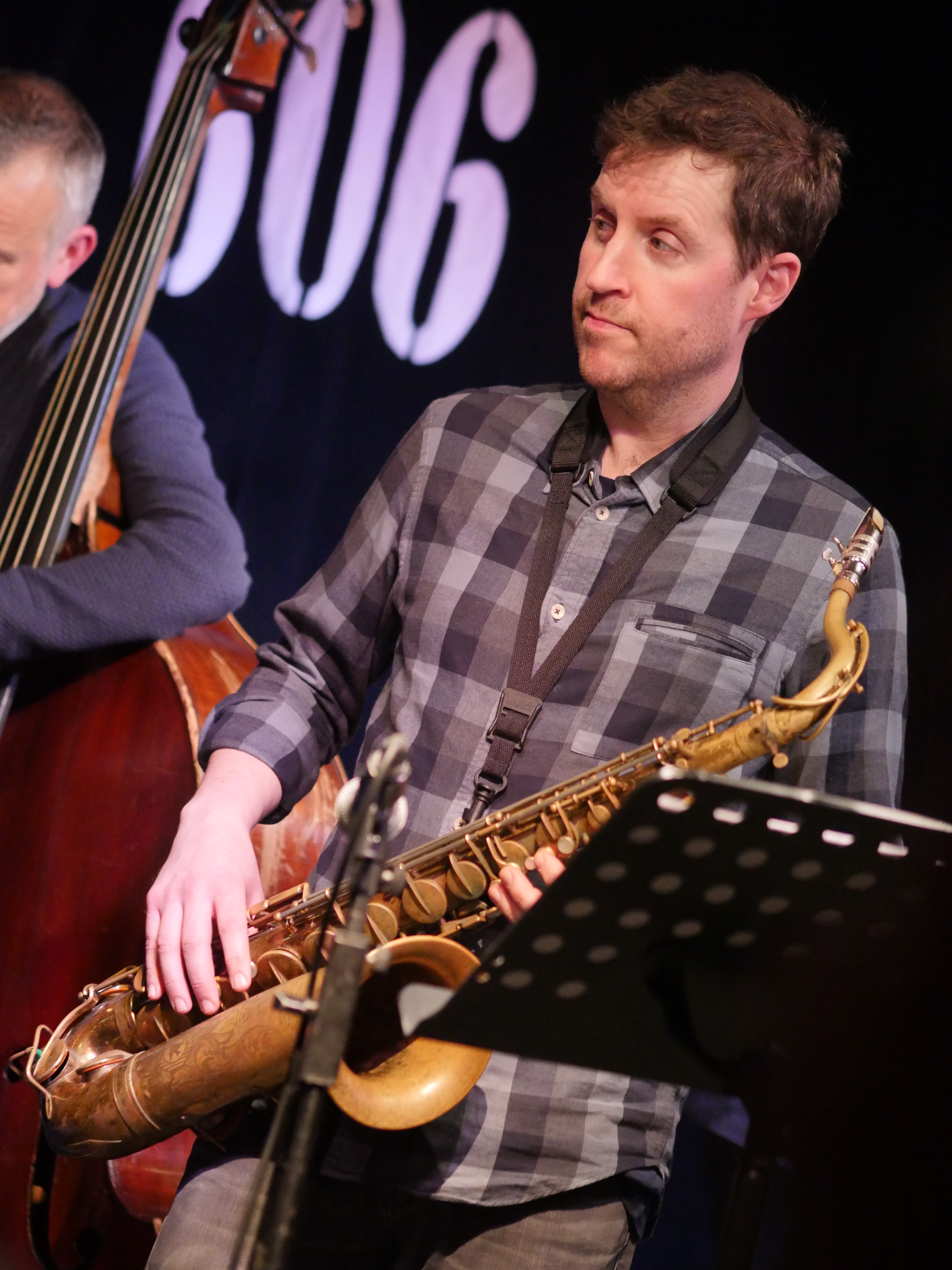
- Castle in 2019

Background information
- Born: 1973 (age 52–53)
- Genres: Jazz
- Occupations: Instrumentalist, songwriter
- Instruments: Clarinet, saxophone
- Years active: 1986–present
- Website: www.bencastle.com

Ben Castle (born 1973) is a British jazz musician, the younger son of television presenter and entertainer Roy Castle (1932–1994) and his wife Fiona (born 1940). He placed first in the Jazz category of the 2003 International Songwriting Competition with his song "The Heckler".

Castle plays the saxophone as well as the clarinet and has performed as a backing musician for Duke Special, Radiohead, Blur, Matthew Herbert, Gregory Porter, Sting, Stan Tracey, Humphrey Lyttelton, George Michael, Djabe, Paloma Faith, Marlena Shaw and Jamie Cullum.

Castle co-wrote the album Little Dreamer with singer Beth Rowley. The album debuted at number 6 on the UK Albums Chart in 2008.

In 1986, Castle saw Marillion play at the Milton Keynes Bowl. Through his interest in drumming as a youth, he became acquainted with Marillion drummer Ian Mosley and many years later performed saxophone on the band's track "Deserve", from their 1999 album Marillion.com, as well as recording an album with Mosley, Postmankind, which was released in 2001.

Castle played the woodwind with the band Storm Corrosion, on their self-titled album.

In 2014, Castle released Over The Moon EP with his band The Tombola Theory on Ben Castle's Major Record Label. They play original pop music inspired by traditional jazz. Ben formed the band to pay tribute to Tommy 'Tootle' Truman, a school caretaker and controversial character who played clarinet in a Trad Jazz band in his local pub every Wednesday night for nearly 23 years. He was Ben's first and most enduring musical influence. Tommy died in obscurity in 2009, leaving behind no known recordings.

== Discography ==
- Big Celebration (1994) (with Roy Castle)
- Breathe Easy (1995)
- Worship Him on the Clarinet (1999)
- Four From The Madding Crowd (2000)
- Postmankind (2001) (with Ian Mosley)
- Blah Street (2004)
- Over The Moon EP (2014) (with The Tombola Theory)
- An EP (2023) (with Ben Castle and the Blah Street Band)
