= Tim Gallagher =

American writer and wildlife photographer

- Born: England
- Education: California State University, Long Beach (BA, MFA)
- Occupations: Writer; wildlife photographer

Tim Gallagher is an American writer and wildlife photographer. Gallagher was a member of the start-up editorial staff of WildBird Magazine, and subsequently editor-in-chief of the Cornell Lab of Ornithology's Living Bird magazine for 26 years. He has published six books, mostly about birds, and has written articles for Audubon andSmithsonian.

In 2004, Gallagher reported sighting an ivory-billed woodpecker in the Big Woods of Arkansas; however, a subsequent expedition led by the Cornell Lab of Ornithology was unable to confirm his sighting. Gallagher's book about the experience, The Grail Bird: Hot on the Trail of the Ivory-billed Woodpecker, was published in May 2005.

Gallagher was born in England and received a B.A. in magazine journalism, and an M.F.A. in English, both from California State University, Long Beach.

== Bibliography ==
- Parts Unknown, a Naturalist's Journey in Search of Birds and Wild Places
- The Grail Bird: Hot on the Trail of the Ivory-billed Woodpecker (ISBN 0-618-45693-7)
- Falcon Fever: A Falconer in the 21st Century
- Imperial Dreams, Tracking the Imperial Woodpecker Through the Wild Sierra Madre
- Born to Fish, How An Obsessed Angler Became the World's Greatest Striped Bass Fisherman
- Wild Bird Photography, A Full-Color Guide
