= Lifted (Lighthouse Family song) =

1995 single by Lighthouse Family

- 1996 re-release artwork

Single by Lighthouse Family

from the album Ocean Drive
- B-side: "Beautiful Night"; "Absolutely Everything"
- Released: 8 May 1995
- Studio: Battery
- Genre: British soul; pop-soul
- Length: 4:31
- Label: Wildcard; Polydor
- Songwriters: Paul Tucker; Tunde Baiyewu; Martin Brammer
- Producer: Mike Peden

Lighthouse Family singles chronology
"Lifted" (1995)	"Ocean Drive" (1995)

Alternative cover
- Australasian artwork

Music video
- "Lifted" on YouTube

"Lifted" is a song written by British musical duo Lighthouse Family for their 1995 debut album, Ocean Drive. The track was produced by Mike Peden and was released as the album's lead single on 8 May 1995, reaching the top 75 in the UK. In January 1996, "Lifted" was re-released, reaching a new peak of number four in the UK and entering the top 40 in Austria, Iceland, Ireland and Israel, as well as on the Canadian RPM Adult Contemporary Tracks chart. In the UK, it was the most-played single on radio during the first quarter of 1996. The accompanying music video was filmed on locations in California, the US.

== Background and release ==
"When we were writing Lifted, we were worried that the record company was going to drop us, and had these deep, intense discussions – "What is life anyway? What is love?" – which fed into the lyrics. For me, it's about being in the darkness, looking for that spiritual thing to lift you out of something. People seemed to connect with it emotionally, mentally, even politically."

— Tunde Baiyewu talking about the song.

Songwriter Paul Tucker worked in a house music club in Newcastle and had written a song called "Ocean Drive". After four years he decided to find a singer to sing it. A friend told him about singer Tunde Baiyewu from London and after singing the song, Tucker felt he was the right person to sing it. Tucker contacted several record companies and sent them the song on cassettes. Several labels showed interest and the duo signed to Polydor Records with only one song. The record company kept asking for more material. They brought in some musicians to record a few songs, but Polydor rejected the songs.

"Lifted" came up in this process. The duo felt they needed some kind of spiritual lift. Tucker also remembered the tunes he had heard in the club where he worked, like "Promised Land" by Joe Smooth. He drew inspiration from these songs and has also stated that the song was inspired by a breakup back when he was living in Newcastle in the early 1990s. The duo had a lot of worries in the writing process. They worried that the record company would drop them. These thoughts also fed into the lyrics of "Lifted". They sent a tape of the new song to Polydor and they loved it.

== Critical reception ==
Ethan Alter from AllMusic picked "Lifted" as one of two "best tunes" from the album, stating that it is "virtually guaranteed to buoy one's spirits." In Billboard magazine, the reviewer felt singer Tunde Baiyewu's style was in some ways similar to that of Seal, calling the track a "wonderful British-soul single... With its shuffling, funk-derived beat and strumming melody." James Masterton for Dotmusic called it "wonderful". Pan-European magazine Music & Media said, "Pop made from an adult angle, but finely tuning into the youngster's taste too by the clever Soul II Soul-inspired rhythm track, it will open up lots of radio possibilities." A reviewer from Music Week gave it a score of three out of five, writing, "Feelgood, radio friendly fare from the Newcastle duo which echoes the uplifting sentiments of Gloria Gaynor's 'I Will Survive'. A grower." Ralph Tee from the magazine's RM Dance Update deemed it a "wholesome guitar-tinged funky soul tune", noting that the original radio friendly version is mixed by British record producer, remixer and composer Mike Peden. Another RM editor, James Hamilton described it as a "husky soulful superb Roger Troutman-ishly vocodered lovely languid strolling 96.8bpm song of hope".

== Music video ==
The music video for "Lifted" features the duo performing in Zabriskie Point and Death Valley Junction, California. The indoor scenes are filmed in Amargosa Opera House and Hotel. It was shot on 35mm film, and the idea was to get something that looked more cinematic than a standard pop video.

== Track listings ==
- UK CD1 (1995)
1. "Lifted" (extended mix)
2. "Beautiful Night"
3. "Absolutely Everything"
4. "Lifted" (7-inch instrumental)
- UK CD2 (1995)
1. "Lifted" (7-inch version)
2. "Lifted" (Rokstone R&B mix)
3. "Lifted" (Rokstone instrumental)
- UK cassette single (1995)
1. "Lifted" (7-inch version)
2. "Absolutely Everything"
- European CD single (1995)
1. "Lifted"
2. "Beautiful Night"
- UK and Australasian CD single (1996)
1. "Lifted" (7-inch mix)
2. "Lifted" (Linslee extended mix)
3. "Lifted" (Linslee instrumental)
4. "Lifted" (Nostalgia Freaks dub)
- UK 12-inch single (1996)

A1. "Lifted" (Linslee extended mix)
A2. "Lifted" (Linslee instrumental)
B1. "Lifted" (Dekkard dub)
B2. "Lifted" (Nostalgia Freaks)

- UK cassette single and European CD single (1996)
1. "Lifted" (7-inch mix)
2. "Lifted" (Linslee 7-inch mix)

== Charts ==
=== Weekly charts ===
Chart (1995)	Peak position
Scottish Singles Sales (Official Charts)	55
UK Singles (Official Charts)	61
UK Hip Hop/R&B (Official Charts)	11

Chart (1996–1997)	Peak position
Australia (ARIA)	178
Austria (Ö3 Austria Top 40)	36
Canada Adult Contemporary (RPM)	27
Estonia (Eesti Top 20)	9
Europe (Eurochart Hot 100)	15
Europe (European Dance Radio)	6
Germany (GfK)	62
Iceland (Íslenski Listinn Topp 40)	33
Ireland (IRMA)	15
Israel (Israeli Singles Chart)	12
Netherlands (Single Top 100)	85
Scottish Singles Sales (Official Charts)	6
UK Singles (Official Charts)	4
UK Dance (OCC)	7
UK Hip Hop/R&B (Official Charts)	2
UK Airplay (Music Week)	1
UK Club Chart (Music Week)	21
US Maxi-Singles Sales (Billboard)	24

=== Year-end charts ===
Chart (1996)	Position
UK Singles (OCC)	56
UK Airplay (Music Week)	5

== Certifications ==
Region	Certification	Certified units/sales
United Kingdom (BPI)	Platinum	600,000^{‡}
^{‡} Sales+streaming figures based on certification alone.

== Release history ==
Region	Date	Format(s)	Label(s)	Ref.
United Kingdom	8 May 1995	CD; cassette	Wildcard; Polydor	
United Kingdom (rerelease)	29 January 1996	12-inch; CD; cassette	Wildcard; Polydor	
United States	25 June 1997	Hot adult contemporary radio	A&M	

== In popular culture ==
The song was used as the official campaign song for the British Labour Party under Tony Blair in their successful 2001 election campaign.
