= Tunde Baiyewu =

British singer and songwriter (born 1968)

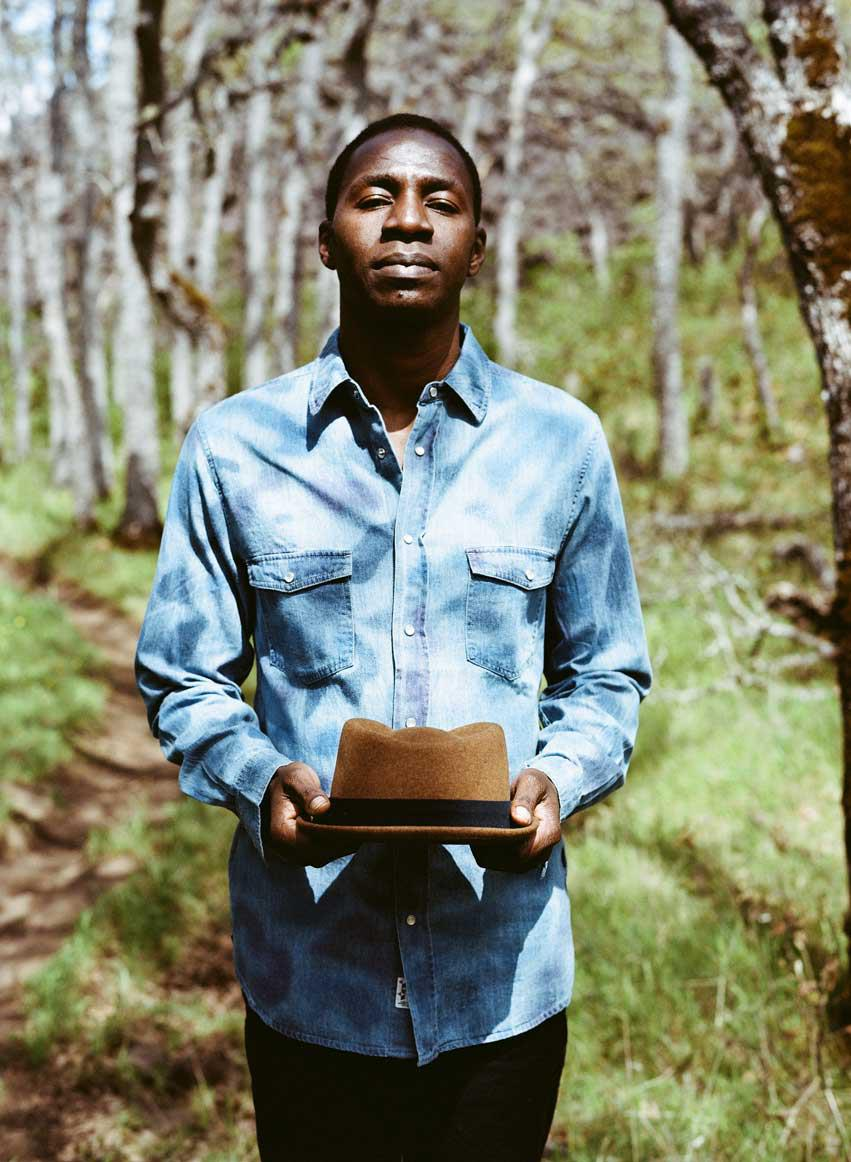
- Baiyewu in 2020

Background information
- Born: Emmanuel Babatunde Baiyewu; 25 November 1968 (age 57); London, England
- Occupations: Singer; songwriter
- Years active: 1993–present
- Labels: Polydor (1993–2003); RCA (2004–present)
- Member of: Lighthouse Family

Emmanuel Babatunde Baiyewu (born 25 November 1968), better known as Tunde Baiyewu, is a British singer and songwriter of Nigerian descent, best known as the vocalist of Lighthouse Family. When the group went on hiatus in 2003, Baiyewu embarked on a solo career, releasing the albums Tunde (2004) and Diamond in a Rock (2013).

== Early life and career ==
Tunde Baiyewu was born in London to a middle-class family of Nigerian descent. His father worked as an engineer but died of cancer when Baiyewu was five, after which the boy moved to Nigeria with his mother and younger sister in order for the family to be closer to relatives. Baiyewu learned to speak Yoruba after moving to Nigeria and attended a boarding school near the then-capital, Lagos. Ten years later, he returned to Britain, attending the University of Northumbria in Newcastle upon Tyne and obtained a degree in accounting. He subsequently met Paul Tucker, who was also at university in Newcastle and working in the bar scene. Their partnership began, and they formed Lighthouse Family.

Lighthouse Family released their debut album, Ocean Drive, with the lead single, "Lifted", reaching the top five on the UK Singles Chart. Ocean Drive was certified six-times Platinum by the end of 1997, selling more than 1.8 million copies in the UK alone and spending 154 weeks on the UK Albums Chart. Lighthouse Family’s follow-up album, Postcards from Heaven, achieved similar sales status in 1997, reaching six-times Platinum status, and Whatever Gets You Through the Day also received Platinum status. The duo has sold over fifteen million albums throughout their career.

In 2004, Baiyewu released his debut solo album, Tunde.

In 2005, he appeared on the BBC Television one-off special Strictly African Dancing, finishing last.

On 12 November 2006, Baiyewu appeared in an ITV documentary called Faith in Music. This documentary charted his life and music, from his roots in Africa, through Lighthouse Family and into his solo incarnation. It also showed him performing an acoustic set featuring tracks from his latest album.

In 2013, Baiyewu announced plans for a second solo album, titled Diamond in a Rock, which was released, together with the single "Move", on 4 March 2013.

In October 2013, Baiyewu joined M People as a support act during their "20th Anniversary Greatest Hits Tour".

In 2019, Lighthouse Family released a new album, Blue Sky in Your Head. The group's first record in eighteen years, it was supported by two sell-out UK tours. The duo split in July 2022 and did not perform at the Mouth of the Tyne Festival, as they had agreed, despite the show selling out.

Since 2020, Baiyewu has been working on a new collection of recordings, inspired by the artists and the singer-songwriter era of the 1970s. Reunited with Lighthouse Family producer Mike Peden, he has recorded a selection of Troubadour-influenced songs, including compositing by Elton John, Crosby, Stills, Nash & Young, James Taylor, Leon Russell, Cat Stevens, Van Morrison, David Gates, Bill Withers, Todd Rundgren, and Barry White.

== Personal life ==
After Baiyewu's father's death, his mother went on to marry former Nigerian president Olusegun Obasanjo. She died in 2000.

In March 2007, Baiyewu married Tope Adeshina, a Nigerian model, in Lagos, Nigeria. They live in the UK.

== Discography ==
=== with Lighthouse Family ===
List of studio albums, with selected details, chart positions and certifications
Title	Details	Peak chart positions										Certifications
Title	Details	UK	AUS	AUT	BEL (FL)	FRA	GER	NL	NZ	SWE	SWI	Certifications
Ocean Drive	Released: 11 November 1995; Label: Wildcard (#5237872); Formats: CD, cassette	3	—	—	—	—	26	—	—	—	—	BPI: 6× Platinum
Postcards from Heaven	Released: 24 October 1997; Label: Wildcard (#5395162); Formats: CD, cassette	2	2	18	19	44	5	16	6	32	12	BPI: 4× Platinum; ARIA: Platinum; BVMI: Platinum
Whatever Gets You Through the Day	Released: 26 November 2001; Label: Wildcard (#5894122); Formats: CD, cassette	7	—	21	—	—	3	88	—	—	29	BPI: Platinum; BVMI: Platinum
Blue Sky in Your Head	Released: 5 July 2019; Label: Polydor; Formats: CD, digital download, streaming	3	—	—	—	—	—	—	—	—	—	BPI: Silver
"—" denotes releases that did not chart or were not released in that region.

=== Solo ===
List of albums, with selected chart positions
Title	Album details	Peak chart positions
Title	Album details	UK
Tunde	Released: 18 October 2004; Label: RCA, BMG	32
Diamond in a Rock	Released: 4 March 2013; Label: Waking Dreams, Neapolitan	—
"—" denotes a recording that did not chart or was not released in that territory.
