= Lighthouse Family =

English musical duo

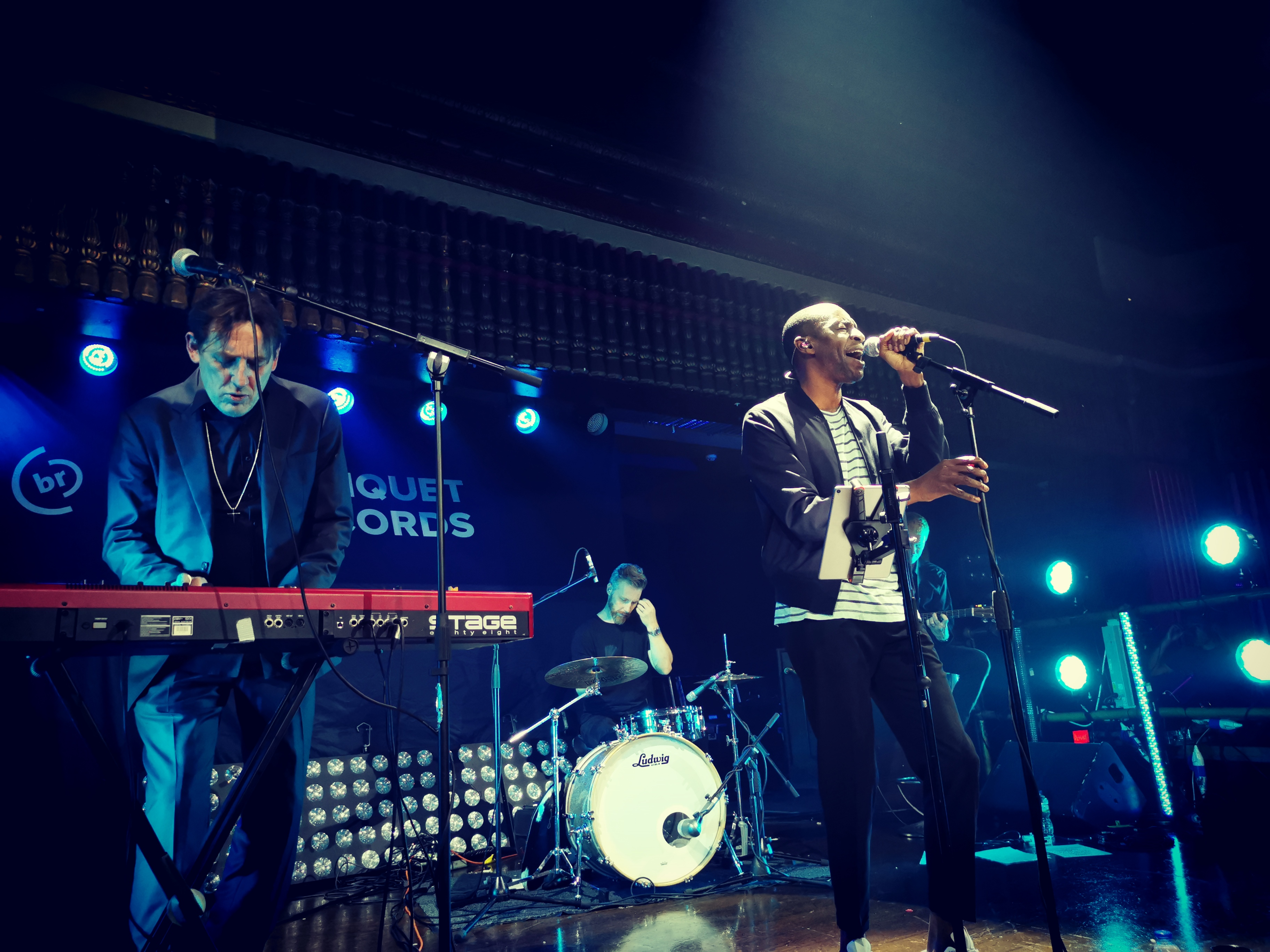
- Lighthouse Family performing at Pryzm, Kingston-upon-Thames, 2019.

Background information
- Origin: Newcastle upon Tyne, England
- Genres: Pop soul; R&B; lounge; easy listening
- Years active: 1993–2003; 2010–2011; 2019–2022; 2026–present
- Labels: Wildcard; Polydor; Universal
- Past members: Tunde Baiyewu; Paul Tucker
- Website: the lighthouse family.co.uk

Lighthouse Family are a British pop soul duo that rose to prominence in the mid-1990s and initially remained active until the early 2000s. Singer Tunde Baiyewu and songwriter Paul Tucker formed the act in 1993 in Newcastle upon Tyne, England, after meeting while studying at university and both working at the same bar. Their 1995 debut album Ocean Drive sold more than 1.8 million copies in the UK alone and established them as a popular easy listening duo throughout Europe.

They are best known for their worldwide hit "High", which peaked at number four on the UK Singles Chart and topped the charts in Australia. Other well-known songs include "Goodbye Heartbreak", "Lifted", "Lost in Space", "Ocean Drive" and "Raincloud". The duo's first studio album in 18 years, Blue Sky in Your Head, was released on 5 July 2019.

== Career ==
Both Baiyewu and Tucker were working in bars when they first met; together, they recorded demos of a number of songs Tucker had written during the late 1980s. Among these, a demo of "Ocean Drive" attracted the attention of Polydor Records A&R director Colin Barlow, who, in 1993, signed the band to a six-month development deal.

In the wake of an economic recession in the United Kingdom, British record labels were, at the time, primarily signing artists with the goal of short-term profit. In contrast, Barlow, in The Times, expected that the band could last for "ten years or more". At the time of the launch of the first album, Polydor's investments in the band totaled £250,000. Producer Mike Peden's hiring was described as a "big spend", and music videos were filmed overseas in Los Angeles and Las Vegas.

The lead single, "Lifted", received airplay on BBC Radio One as well as a number of BBC Local Radio stations, and The Chart Show aired its music video. Still, this did not translate to considerable single or album sales within 1995; it was not until "Lifted" was re-released in 1996 that it reached the top five on the UK Singles Chart, and Ocean Drive, which had been deleted, rebounded and was certified six-times platinum by the end of 1997, spending 154 weeks on the UK Albums Chart in the process. Its follow-up Postcards from Heaven achieved similar sales status in 1997. It featured the hit single "High" (number four in the UK) with the music video filmed in North East England and featuring Newcastle's Tyne Bridge.

Lighthouse Family scaled down their appearances in early 2003 because of what they called a "heavy promotional schedule" following the release of Whatever Gets You Through the Day in 2001. This led to both men pursuing individual projects. Baiyewu became a solo artist, while Tucker joined a rock band, The Orange Lights.

In November 2010, the duo announced they were reforming Lighthouse Family and did a full UK and Ireland tour, in February and March 2011. It was the first performance of Lighthouse Family in eight years. During an interview on breakfast TV show BBC Breakfast on 17 January 2011, Lighthouse Family revealed they had still been talking to each other during their time away, and that there was no current defined timescale for the release of a new album. That said, Tucker mentioned during the interview that the duo had "pockets... full of songs".

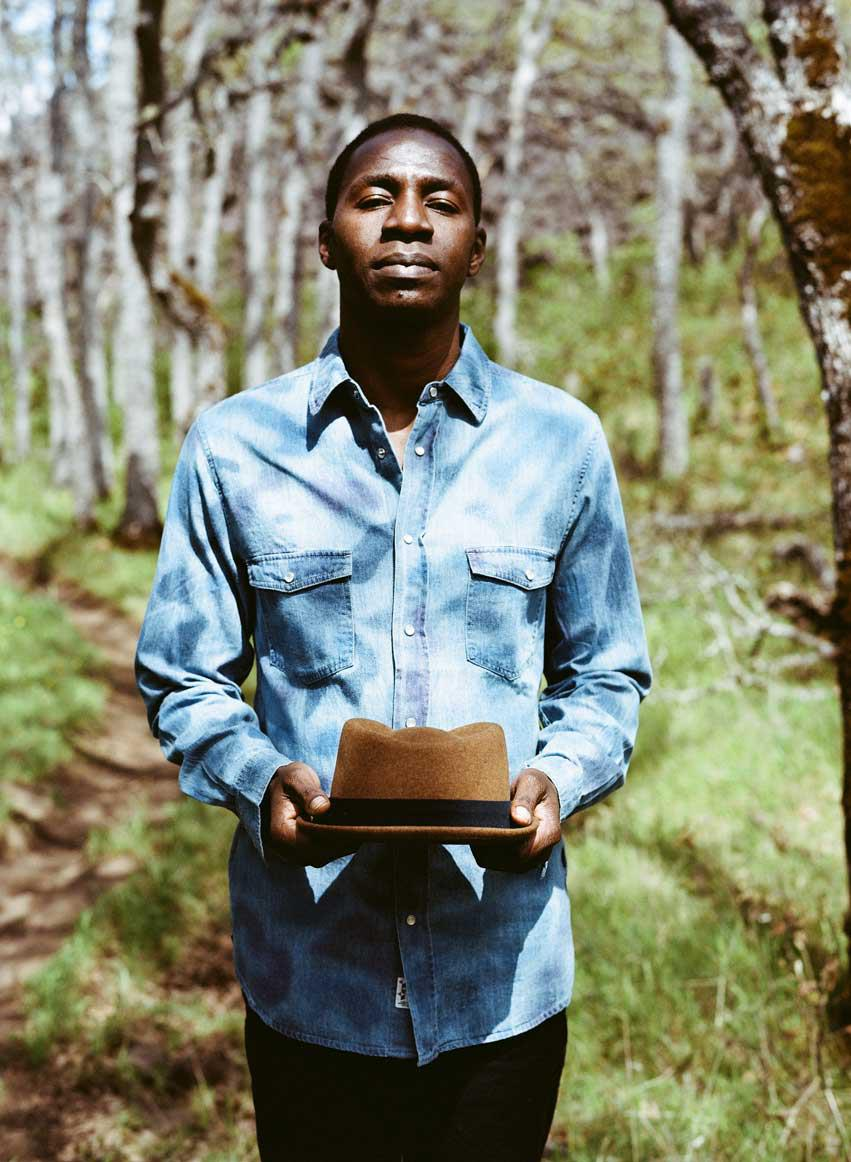
Tunde Baiyewu (pictured in 2020)

The duo had planned to release their fourth album, Blue Sky in Your Head, on 3 May 2019; introduced by the single, "My Salvation", on 21 March. The album release was delayed until 5 July 2019. Blue Sky in Your Head was their first album in 18 years. Lighthouse Family announced a multi-date UK tour commencing in November 2019. The album was supported with two sell-out UK tours.

Tucker announced in June 2022 that the duo would no longer be performing together, as Baiyewu wished to focus on his solo career.

On 19 October 2026, Lighthouse Family announced they would be reuniting for a March 2027 tour of the U.K. and Ireland in celebration of Ocean Drive'.

== Discography ==
- Ocean Drive (1995)
- Postcards from Heaven (1997)
- Whatever Gets You Through the Day (2001)
- Blue Sky in Your Head (2019)
