= Paul Tucker (musician) =

British musician

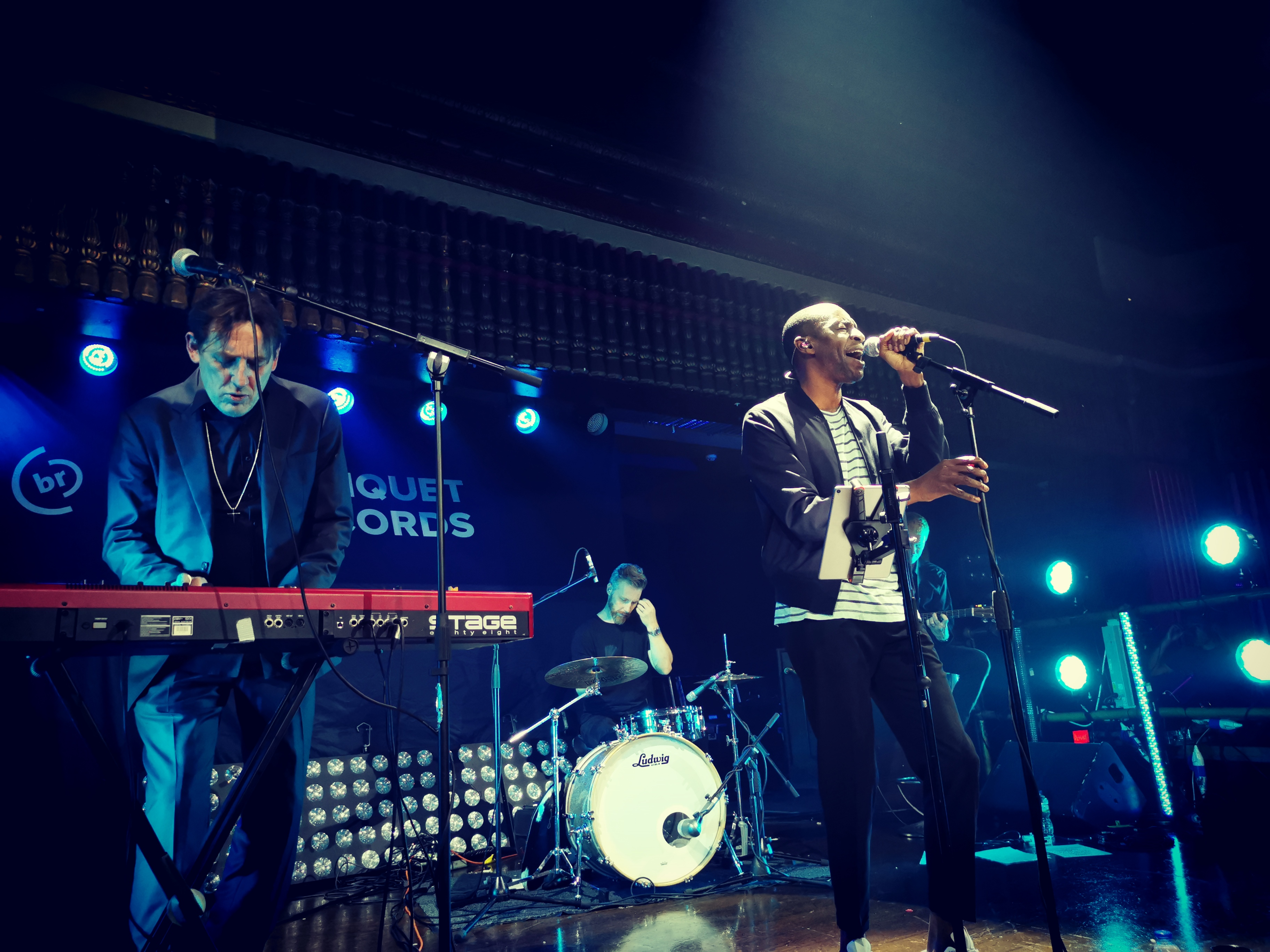
- Tucker (left) on stage with Lighthouse Family in 2019

Background information
- Genres: Pop soul, R&B
- Occupation: Musician
- Instruments: Keyboards; guitar; bass
- Years active: 1993–present
- Member of: Lighthouse Family
- Formerly of: The Orange Lights

Paul Tucker is a British musician, best known for being one half of the music duo Lighthouse Family with Tunde Baiyewu.

== Career ==
Tucker met Tunde Baiyewu in early 1990s while they were both working in bars and attending Newcastle University. They soon formed the soul duo Lighthouse Family, and after recording a handful of demos written by Tucker, they signed to Polydor.

Baiyewu served as the lead singer, while Tucker, a multi-instrumenalist, served mainly on keyboards. Between 1995 and 2002, the duo had eleven consecutive UK top 40s, most of which Tucker co-wrote with Baiyewu, but songs such as "Ocean Drive" and "High", were written solely by Tucker.

Lighthouse Family disbanded in 2003, and the duo went their separate ways. A year later, Tucker formed The Orange Lights with Jason Hart, a former member of Spiritualized. They released one album before disbanding in 2007.

Lighthouse Family reformed in 2010 for a tour that would last until 2011, and originally plans for a new studio album, which according to Tucker "we couldn't make that work". They returned again in 2019, releasing their fourth and most recent album, Blue Sky in Your Head, the same year. In 2022, Tucker announced they had split again as Baiyewu wanted to focus on his solo career, however they reunited in 2026 for a tour set to take place in 2027.
