= Mike Peden =

British record producer

Michael Peden is a British record producer, remixer and composer, best known for his work with the British musical duo Lighthouse Family. With his former band the Chimes, Peden had a hit single with their version of "I Still Haven't Found What I'm Looking For".

== Biography ==
Born in Edinburgh, Scotland, Peden began his career as a bass player with local band Everest the Hard Way (1980–82) and later as a member of the Chimes. Peden has also produced an album for the British singer-songwriter, Lucie Silvas, as well as working with Shara Nelson, Daryl Hall, and Mica Paris.

In 1996, Peden was named director of A&R for Jive Records. He became senior A&R director for 360 Records label by 2000.
