= Chasing Shadows (The Comsat Angels album) =

Studio album by The Comsat Angels
- Released: 1986
- Genre: Post-punk
- Length: 41:32
- Label: Island
- Producer: The Comsat Angels, Kevin Moloney, Rob Fraboni

The Comsat Angels chronology
7 Day Weekend (1985)	Chasing Shadows (1986)	Fire on the Moon (1990)

Professional ratings
Review scores
Source	Rating
AllMusic	3/5 stars

Chasing Shadows is the Comsat Angels' sixth album, released in 1986 on Island Records.

Having left Jive Records, the band had gotten a recording contract with Island, aided by Robert Palmer, who confessed on a TV show to be a fan of the Comsat Angels. As a thank you, he was credited as "executive producer" on the album, and also provided vocals for the song "You'll Never Know."

The track "The Cutting Edge" was released as a single, with "Something's Got to Give" on the B-side. The latter song was not included on the album, but later appeared as a demo track on the 2007 release To Before. The original version appeared on the 2015 reissue of Chasing Shadows.

Chasing Shadows was regarded by the band as a departure from their two prior albums, Land and 7 Day Weekend, which were produced by Jive Records. During a 1997 interview, frontman Stephen Fellows agreed with a suggestion that Chasing Shadows displayed his best vocal performance, adding: "I liked Rockfield, where we recorded Chasing Shadows cos it was very informal. We played mostly live, with vocals added later. Sleep No More was done live – the feel, capturing the moment. Obviously the Jive albums weren't done like that – assembled by machines in another room while we watched television and ate fruit".

Chasing Shadows was reissued by Edsel Records in November 2015 as part of a two-CD set which also included the 1990 album Fire on the Moon, which was recorded by the band using the name Dream Command.

== Track listing ==
All tracks written by Fellows/Glaisher/Bacon/Peake.

1. "The Thought That Counts" – 6:03
2. "The Cutting Edge" – 5:06
3. "Under the Influence" – 4:22
4. "Carried Away" – 5:05
5. "You'll Never Know" – 4:57
6. "Lost Continent" – 5:01
7. "Flying Dreams" – 5:45
8. "Pray for Rain" – 5:01
9. "Something's Got to Give" (2015 edition bonus track)

== Personnel ==
The Comsat Angels

- Stephen Fellows – vocals, guitar
- Andy Peake – synthesizer, vocals
- Kevin Bacon – bass guitar
- Mik Glaisher – drums

with:

- Robert Palmer – executive producer; vocals on "You'll Never Know"
- Rob Fraboni – post-production, mixing
