= Fiction (The Comsat Angels album) =

Studio album by The Comsat Angels
- Released: August 1982
- Recorded: May–June 1982
- Studio: Strawberry 1 & 2, Stockport; Polydor Workshop Studios
- Genre: Post-punk
- Length: 41:16
- Label: Polydor
- Producer: Peter Wilson and the Comsat Angels

The Comsat Angels chronology
Sleep No More (1981)	Fiction (1982)	Land (1983)

Singles from Fiction
- 1. "It's History" / "Zinger" Released: May 1982; 2. "After the Rain" Released: October 1982

Professional ratings
Review scores
Source	Rating
AllMusic	3.5/5 stars
Stylus	B

Fiction is the Comsat Angels' third album, released in August 1982 on Polydor Records. The album has been reissued on CD three times: in 1995 by RPM Records, in 2006 by Renascent and in 2015 by Edsel Records, with different track listings (see below). The album peaked at No. 94 in the UK charts in September 1982.

Fiction was less gloomy than the Comsats' previous album, Sleep No More. Frontman Stephen Fellows said of the change: "I certainly didn't want to make another record as intense as Sleep No More — at least not immediately. Sleep No More was so dark that I felt it skewed things a bit — possibly even mentally for me. I just felt if we carried on in that direction it'd lead to madness or maybe even something worse".

Fellows was satisfied with many of the songs on Fiction, including "What Else!?", "Pictures" and "After the Rain", but felt that the album as a whole could have been better. "We were a bit short of tunes when we recorded it", he said. "We were touring quite a bit after Sleep No More and there wasn't as much time to write as I would have liked".

== Track listing (1982) ==
All tracks written by Fellows/Glaisher/Bacon/Peake.

1. "After the Rain"
2. "Zinger"
3. "Now I Know"
4. "Not a Word"
5. "Ju Ju Money"
6. "More"
7. "Pictures"
8. "Birdman"
9. "Don't Look Now"
10. "What Else!?"

== Track listing (1995) ==
All tracks written by Fellows/Glaisher/Bacon/Peake.

1. "After the Rain"
2. "Zinger"
3. "Now I Know"
4. "Not a Word"
5. "Ju Ju Money"
6. "More"
7. "Pictures"
8. "Birdman"
9. "Don't Look Now"
10. "What Else!?"
11. "It's History"
12. "After the Rain" (Remix)
13. "Private Party"
14. "Mass"

== Track listing (2006) ==
All tracks written by Fellows/Glaisher/Bacon/Peake.

1. "After the Rain"
2. "Zinger"
3. "Now I Know"
4. "Not a Word"
5. "Ju Ju Money"
6. "More"
7. "Pictures"
8. "Birdman"
9. "Don't Look Now"
10. "What Else!?"
11. "(Do The) Empty House"
12. "Red Planet Revisited"
13. "It's History"
14. "Private Party"
15. "For Your Information"
16. "After the Rain" (Remix)
17. "(Do The) Empty House" (Live)
18. "What Else!?" (Live)

== Track listing (2015) ==
All tracks written by Fellows/Glaisher/Bacon/Peake.

Disc 1

1. "After the Rain"
2. "Zinger"
3. "Now I Know"
4. "Not a Word"
5. "Ju Ju Money"
6. "More"
7. "Pictures"
8. "Birdman"
9. "Don't Look Now"
10. "What Else!?"

Disc 2 – bonus tracks

1. "(Do The) Empty House"
2. "Red Planet Revisited"
3. "It's History"
4. "Private Party"
5. "For Your Information"
6. "After the Rain" (Remix)

John Peel Session

1. "Now I Know"
2. "Ju Ju Money"
3. "Our Secret"
4. "Goat of the West"

== Personnel ==
The Comsat Angels

- Stephen Fellows – vocals, guitar, artwork
- Andy Peake – synthesizer, vocals
- Kevin Bacon – bass guitar
- Mik Glaisher – drums
