= An Emotional Fish =

Alternative rock band from Dublin, Ireland

- Origin: Dublin, Ireland
- Genres: Alternative rock
- Years active: 1988–present
- Labels: Mother Records; Atlantic Records; East West Records
- Members: Gerard Whelan; David Frew
- Past members: Martin Murphy; Enda Wyatt
- Website: http://www.anemotionalfish.net

An Emotional Fish are an alternative rock band from Dublin, Ireland. An Emotional Fish were formed in 1988, and consisted of Gerard Whelan (founding member, lead vocals, percussion), Enda Wyatt (founding member, songwriter, bass, vocals, keyboards), Martin Murphy (drums, percussion) and David Frew (guitars, vocals).

Their musical influences include The Clash, The Doors, David Bowie, Iggy Pop, and T. Rex.

In the late 1980s and early 1990s, An Emotional Fish were signed to Mother Records in Ireland, Warner Bros Records in Europe, and Atlantic Records in America. They were personally signed to Atlantic by Ahmet Ertegun, after seeing them play a sold-out concert at the Baggot Inn. An Emotional Fish supported U2 and Simple Minds on tours of Europe, also supporting Blondie, Depeche Mode and others.

== Career ==
The vocalist Gerard Whelan met bassist Enda Wyatt in a band that Whelan was auditioning for. Whelan joined the band, but it broke up soon after. After the break-up, Whelan and Wyatt formed their own band. They originally performed alone, and recorded their works on a four-track tape recorder. After a year, Whelan brought his friend David Frew into the band. Whelan and David Frew had attended the same school and lived in the same housing estate. In 1988, they decided to name the band An Emotional Fish. For a few months, they performed with a drum machine, but soon added drummer Martin Murphy as the final member of the group.

In 1989, they signed to independent Mother Records to release their first single "Cry Like a Baby/Grey Matter". It was followed by "Celebrate", which hit the top 10 in the Irish chart. It also peaked at No. 46 in the UK Singles Chart in June 1990, where it remained in that listing for five weeks. College radio stations began to pick up the song. It received significant airplay and reached the top 5 on the US Modern Rock Tracks chart. Atlantic Records signed the band, re-released "Grey Matter" in the US, and released their debut album internationally.

"Celebrate" was covered in Italian by the singer-songwriter Vasco Rossi in his 1993 album Gli Spari Sopra which went platinum 10 times. The song lyrics are largely a phonetic translation of the original (prominently the chorus verse "this party's over" is changed into the eponym "gli spari sopra", which means "the shots above" and is entirely unrelated to the original lyrics).

After a tour to support the debut album, An Emotional Fish returned to the studio to record Junk Puppets. The songs were recorded over eight months, and four of the songs were produced by David A. Stewart. In 1993, the album was released, and An Emotional Fish opened for U2 on the Zoo TV Tour. In 1994, the band were signed to German label ZYX Records and their third album Sloper was released in Europe. The album was released in the US two years later.

== Break up ==
In 1999, after a few years of relative inactivity, the band played a short tour of the Netherlands in spring, and a single date in Dublin in December. Their final show was in the following December in Dublin' Isaac Butt's with the band breaking up soon after.

In 2002, Whelan formed a new band, Jerry Fish & The Mudbug Club, with a new style and musical presence, in which he continued to work with Enda Wyatt. They co-write the first album Be Yourself and three songs on the second album The Beautiful Untrue. The band has a rotating line-up of collaborators and plays gigs around Ireland regularly.

David Frew performed on The Marigolds Abbey Street EP which was released in 1998. More recently he has been playing with former Marigolds frontman Paul Woodward. David performed a series of low key gigs in Scotland at the end of 2011.

== Reunions ==
On March 30, 2012. the band played in the Olympia Theatre in Dublin at a concert in aid of Barretstown alongside such other Irish bands as Engine Alley and Republic of Loose.

The band played a five-song set at the Féile Classical festival on September 22, 2018, and dedicated their song "Julian" to their late drummer Martin Murphy. Two of the songs from this performance were later released on Feile Classical: The Live Album.

Martin Murphy died January 3, 2017.

Enda Wyatt died on November 26, 2022, in Dublin.

== Discography ==
=== Albums ===
- An Emotional Fish, 1990 - UK No. 40
- Junk Puppets, 1993
- Sloper, 1994 (UK), 1996 (US)

=== Live albums ===
- Celebration Live, 1991
- Live Bait, 1991

=== Videos ===
- An Emotional Fish, 1990 (VHS edition)

=== Singles ===
Year	Title	Chart positions		Album
Year	Title	Irish Singles Chart	US Modern Rock	Album
1989	"Cry Like a Baby"	23	-	non-album track
1989	"Grey Matter"	28	-	An Emotional Fish
1989	"Celebrate"	10	4	An Emotional Fish
1990	"Lace Virginia"	4	-	An Emotional Fish
1990	"Blue"	30	-	An Emotional Fish
1991	"Grey Matter" (remix)	-	18	An Emotional Fish
1993	"Rain"	11	15	Junk Puppets
1994	"Time Is on the Wall"	22	-	Sloper
1994	"Aeroplanes"	-	-	Sloper
1995	"Superman"	-	-	Sloper
1995	"Summertime"	-	-	Sloper
