= Time Considered as a Helix of Semi-Precious Stones – The BBC Sessions 1979–1984 =

Time Considered as a Helix of Semi-Precious Stones – The BBC Sessions 1979-1984

Compilation album by The Comsat Angels
- Released: 1992, reissued in 2006
- Recorded: 1979–1984
- Genre: Post-punk
- Length: 1:14:25
- Label: BBC Music (1992), Renascent (2006)
- Producer: Comsat Angels

The Comsat Angels compilations chronology
Enz (1982)	Time Considered as a Helix of Semi-Precious Stones – The BBC Sessions 1979-1984 (1992)	Unravelled (1995)

Professional ratings
Review scores
Source	Rating
AllMusic	4/5 stars
Stylus	A

Time Considered as a Helix of Semi-Precious Stones – The BBC Sessions 1979-1984, a compilation album by the Comsat Angels, was released in 1992 by Sheffield-based RPM records and reissued by Renascent in 2006. The name of the album was taken from the award-winning science fiction short story of the same name by Samuel R. Delany.

The album was a collection of studio recordings made specifically to be aired on BBC Radio. Until 1988, restrictions were in place that limited the amount of commercial records that could be broadcast on the BBC. As a result, bands had to reproduce their music in the BBC's own studios. Disc jockey John Peel became known for having these types of recordings on his show, and they became known as "Peel Sessions."

Time Considered... features songs from the early part of the Comsat Angels' career, up through 1985's 7 Day Weekend. Not all tracks were taken from John Peel broadcasts; some came from the shows of other DJs: Richard Skinner, Kid Jensen, Janice Long, Bruno Brookes and Graham Bannerman.

== Track listing ==
All tracks written by Fellows, Glaisher, Bacon and Peake, except where noted.

1. "At Sea" – 4:06
2. "Be Brave" – 3:52
3. "Eye of the Lens" – 3:55
4. "Total War" – 4:45
5. "Real Story" – 3:45
6. "Waiting for a Miracle" – 2:55
7. "Ju Ju Money" – 4:17
8. "Independence Day" – 3:23
9. "The Eye Dance" – 3:27
10. "Gone" – 3:17
11. "Dark Parade" – 5:06
12. "Our Secret" – 4:10
13. "Now I Know" – 4:12
14. "Citadel" (Mick Jagger, Keith Richards) – 3:02
15. "High Tide" – 4:47
16. "Mr. Memory" – 4:06
17. "Island Heart" – 3:46
18. "You Move Me" – 4:18
19. "Nature Trails" – 4:16

== Personnel ==
- Stephen Fellows – vocals, guitar
- Andy Peake – synthesizer, vocals
- Kevin Bacon – bass guitar
- Mik Glaisher – drums
