= Audioweb (album) =

Studio album by Audioweb
- Released: October 1996
- Recorded: 1995–1996
- Length: 43:29
- Label: Mother Records
- Producer: Audioweb, Jonathan Quarmby, Kevin Bacon, Prince Jammy

Audioweb chronology
Audioweb (1996)	Fireworks City (1998)

Audioweb is the eponymously titled debut album from the Manchester-based band. The album was released in the UK in October 1996, along with a 2CD limited edition version containing a bonus disc of 6 live tracks.

The album was produced by Kevin Bacon and Jonathan Quarmby with additional production and programming by Audioweb.

== Track listing ==
All tracks written by Audioweb, except where noted.

Audioweb
No.	Title	Writer(s)	Length
1.	"Sleeper"		5:15
2.	"Yeah?"		4:00
3.	"Into My World"	Merchant/McCann/Wigby	4:20
4.	"Faker"		4:26
5.	"Who's To Blame"		4:05
6.	"Time"		4:18
7.	"Jah Love"	Audioweb/Wayne Smith	3:58
8.	"Bankrobber"	Joe Strummer/Mick Jones/Half Pint	3:40
9.	"Lover"		4:30

- Track 7 contains a sample of the Wayne Smith song, "Saying Goodbye".

Limited Edition Bonus Disc
No.	Title	Length
1.	"Yeah?"	3:52
2.	"Faker"	4:20
3.	"Into My World"	4:24
4.	"Time"	4:32
5.	"Lover"	5:17
6.	"Sleeper"	5:37

- All tracks on the live CD were performed at the Reading Festival on August 25, 1996, except "Faker", which was performed at BBC Radio One's Sound City music festival held in Leeds on April 11, 1996.

== Personnel ==
=== Audioweb ===
- Martin Merchant - lead vocals, production
- Robin File - guitars, programming, production
- Sean McCann - bass, programming, production
- Maxi - drums, programming, production

=== Additional musicians ===
- DJ Play - turntables, keyboards (track 2)
- Kevin Bacon - production, programming, keyboards, mixing
- Jonathan Quarmby - production, additional programming, keyboards
- Prince Jammy - production (track 7)
- Phil Knott - photography
