= Before Novels =

1990 book by J. Paul Hunter

Before Novels: The Cultural Contexts of Eighteenth Century English Fiction
- Cover of the first edition
- Author: J. Paul Hunter
- Language: English
- Subject: Literary criticism
- Publisher: W. W. Norton
- Publication date: 1990
- Publication place: United States
- Media type: Print
- ISBN: 0-393-02801-1

Before Novels: The Cultural Contexts of Eighteenth Century English Fiction is a 1990 book by literary scholar and professor J. Paul Hunter. Hunter gives an account of the many non-fictional sources that led to the rise of the English novel, many of them non-literary.

== Overview ==
Hunter argues that to understand the eighteenth-century English novel, we must understand the "pasts and traditions" from which the novel emerged, including journalism, occasional meditations, the related genres of wonder books and Providence books, private diaries, didactic works, and travel narratives.

Hunter gives a detailed history of the nature of these various types of works that helped foster the rise of the novel, and he explains the roles of writers, booksellers, and other people who ushered the English novel into existence.

== Reception ==
Before Novels was highly praised in the academic press, where it was widely reviewed.

Bridget Fowler in The British Journal of Sociology wrote, "If, as Hunter claims, the novel's imaginative form transcends its source, his research on the precise nature of that source is highly illuminating." Fowler went on to say that Hunter "makes such a good case for the important consequences of the role of the collective consciousness in the consumption of popular writing and novels, and especially its decisive impact in the initial dispute with the Augustans. His conclusion, then, is compelling. Rather than the work of a humanist elite, he asserts that it was 'the energies of popular culture (which) arrested the literary tradition from its conservative guardians'."

Julia V. Douthwaite, writing in Harvard Book Review, hailed Before Novels as "a masterful attempt to synthesize the social, religious and economic forces which characterized English culture.... Hunter emphasizes the links between canonical "Literature" and the texts of popular culture—newspaper advice columns, vocational how-to books, personal diaries, and Protestant pedagogical tracts. He argues that the novels of Swift, Fielding and Richardson address the same hopes, fears and anxieties previously addressed by these second-rate "paraliterary" texts."

Mark Spilka in Novel: A Forum on Fiction called Before Novels "a long-awaited magnum opus from a wise, honorable, sophisticated, and amazingly informed expounder of the novel's rise and of the newly exciting age which made it possible. Though not as revolutionary as Watt's classic study, Hunter's multivalent, standard-setting volume will serve handsomely as its critical and cultural equivalent for our own exciting times."

D. E. Richardson in The Sewanee Review was laudatory in his review: "Hunter campaigns, on behalf of the New Historicism, against what he calls traditional literary history. His tone is fervent and adversarial, as if it were morally imperative for the reader to adopt his critical perspectives. Since something very important seems to be at stake, the reader would like Hunter to provide a theoretical statement of the issues that divide old and new literary history, but instead the reader has to deduce it. What emerges in Hunter's book as the New Historicism is the project of placing literary works in their historical context in an engagé politically progressivist way. Texts are to be read as scenes of social conflict and the New Historicist critic is to advocate the progressive side."

Margaret Anne Doody, writing in the South Atlantic Review, observed that "[t]he strength of Before Novels lies in its treatment of what is usually offered merely as "background" to studies of the novel in general or to the study of particular novels. There is nothing here of much interest on any one novel or novelist. Despite Hunter's initial claim to have read numbers of the novels of the period, he does not offer us many examples aside from the best-known works of major authors. We get references to Robinson Crusoe, Moll Flanders, Tom Jones, Clarissa—but little real reference to or quotations from other fictional works by other writers."

Jeffrey Smitten, discussing the book in The Review of English Studies, stated that "there is little question that Hunter has written a superb book—one that will exert a major impact on the study of the origins of the novel and of eighteenth-century literature generally. He has effected a Copernican revolution by shifting the centre of energy in the period from the conservative tradition of Dryden, Swift, and Pope to the inventive, dynamic, and ultimately one consisting of figures that the Augustans feared and loathed—the likes of Dunton, Cibber, Manly, and Defoe. We are in many ways more the descendants of the latter tradition than the former, and Hunter's excellent book enables us to move beyond the traditional canon to begin to explore the implications of a parentage that has been too easily denied."

Frank McConnell, reviewing Before Novels alongside Alvin Kernan's The Death of Literature in The Wilson Quarterly, wrote that "Hunter's depiction of the newly enfranchised 18th-century audiences would not make a bad description of the novelty-mad, tradition-ignoring, postmodern television mutants whom Kernan et al. regard as the pallbearers of 'humanism's long dream of learning.' It is ironic that Hunter, by far the more donnish of the two critics, should be the one to remind us that the barbarians at the gates are really only our children."

== Sources ==
- Doody, Margaret Anne (November 1992). "Before Novels: The Cultural Contexts of Eighteenth-Century English Fiction by J. Paul Hunter". South Atlantic Review. 57 (4): 123–126. doi:10.2307/3199846. JSTOR 3199846.
- Douthwaite, Julia V. (Summer–Fall 1990). "Review of Before Novels: The Cultural Contexts of Eighteenth-Century English Fiction by J. Paul Hunter". Harvard Book Review (17/18): 12–13. JSTOR 27500122.
- Fowler, Bridget (June 1993). "Review of Before Novels: The Cultural Contexts of Eighteenth-Century English Fiction by J. Paul Hunter". The British Journal of Sociology. 44 (2): 351–352. doi:10.2307/591232. JSTOR 591232.
- McConnell, Frank (Winter 1991). "Literature and Its Discontents (review of The Death of Literature by Alvin Kernan; Before Novels: The Cultural Contexts of Eighteenth-Century English Fiction by J. Paul Hunter)". The Wilson Quarterly. 15 (1): 89–91. JSTOR 40233159.
- Richardson, D. E. (Fall 1990). "Invoking the Smithfield Muses (review of Before Novels: The Cultural Contexts of Eighteenth-Century English Fiction by J. Paul Hunter)". The Sewanee Review. 98 (4): xcix–cii. JSTOR 27546251.
- Smitten, Jeffrey (February 1993). "Before Novels: The Cultural Contexts of Eighteenth-Century English Fiction by J. Paul Hunter". The Review of English Studies. 44 (173): 108–109. doi:10.1093/res/XLIV.173.108. JSTOR 518461.
- Spilka, Mark (Spring 1994). "Hunter's Quarry (review of Before Novels: The Cultural Contexts of Eighteenth-Century English Fiction by J. Paul Hunter)". Novel: A Forum on Fiction. 27 (3): 322–323. doi:10.2307/1345652. JSTOR 1345652.
