= The Glamour (album) =

Studio album by The Comsat Angels
- Released: 1995, reissued 2007
- Recorded: 1994
- Studio: Axis Studio, Sheffield
- Genre: Post-punk
- Length: 62:11 (1995); 89:36 (2007)
- Label: RPM Records (1995), Renascent (2007)
- Producer: The Comsat Angels

The Comsat Angels chronology
My Mind's Eye (1992)	The Glamour (1995)

Professional ratings
Review scores
Source	Rating
AllMusic	3/5 stars
PopMatters	6/10 stars
Q	4/5 stars

The Glamour is the ninth and final album by the Comsat Angels, released in 1995 on RPM Records and on Caroline Records in the US. In 2007, Renascent reissued the album as a double CD with seven additional tracks.

This was the Comsat Angels' last studio album and the only one with a lineup of five band members. Bass player Kevin Bacon had left the band after the release of My Minds Eye and was replaced by Terry Todd. A second guitarist, Simon Anderson, was also added.

Comsats frontman Stephen Fellows regretted how rushed they were in producing this album, saying, "We were prevented by deadlines from finishing all the music we were recording." He also said, in a 1997 interview, "Although I am very pleased with The Glamour as the last album it was kind of [Mik Glashier] piloted that one, he wanted to make a rock album". In his view, the 2007 reissue, with its added tracks, improved the album. Fellows said, "This is much closer to how it should have been".

== Critical reception ==
Stuart Maconie in Q magazine proclaimed the album to be "excellent, febrile, imaginative rock, both epic and wry".

== Track listing (1995) ==
All tracks written by Fellows/Glaisher/Peake/Todd/Anderson.

1. "Psychedelic Dungeon" – 3:57
2. "The Glamour" – 3:15
3. "Audrey in Denim" – 4:46
4. "Oblivion" – 7:42
5. "Web of Sound" – 3:52
6. "Breaker" – 6:23
7. "SS100X" – 3:41
8. "Sailor" – 3:24
9. "Demon Lover" – 3:15
10. "Pacific Ocean Blues" – 4:22
11. "Anjelica" – 4:11
12. "Valley of the Nile" – 4:32
13. "Spaced" – 8:51

== Track listing (2007) ==
All tracks written by Fellows/Glaisher/Peake/Todd/Anderson.

=== Disc one ===
1. "I Hear a New World" (Alternative Mix, Re-master) – 4:17
2. "Goddess" (Re-master) – 3:32
3. "Anjelica" (Different Vocals, Alternative Mix) – 4:11
4. "Valley of the Nile" (Alternative Mix) – 4:32
5. "Sailor" – 3:24
6. "Pacific Ocean Blues" – 4:22
7. "Oblivion" – 7:42
8. "The Niala Game" – 4:27
9. "Audrey in Denim" – 4:46
10. "Demon Lover" – 3:15

=== Disc two ===
1. "Psychedelic Dungeon" – 3:57
2. "SS100X" (Different Vocals, Alternative Mix) – 3:41
3. "The Glamour" – 3:15
4. "Breaker" – 6:23
5. "Evanescent" – 4:33
6. "Hyperprism 1" – 4:14
7. "Spaced" – 8:51
8. "Web of Sound" – 3:52
9. "A Song Called Dave" – 1:59
10. "Slayer of the Real" (Demo) – 4:23

== Personnel ==
- Stephen Fellows - vocals, guitar
- Andy Peake - synthesizer, vocals
- Mik Glaisher - drums
- Terry Todd - bass guitar
- Simon Anderson - guitar
