= Land (The Comsat Angels album) =

Studio album by The Comsat Angels
- Released: September 1983
- Recorded: June 1983
- Studio: Battery Studios, London
- Genre: New wave, post-punk
- Length: 42:22 (LP)
- Label: Jive
- Producer: Mike Howlett

The Comsat Angels chronology
Fiction (1982)	Land (1983)	7 Day Weekend (1985)

Professional ratings
Review scores
Source	Rating
AllMusic	2.5/5 stars
Smash Hits	8/10

Land is the Comsat Angels' fourth album, released in September 1983 on Jive Records. The album was reissued on CD in 2001 with five B-sides as bonus tracks for Jive's "Connoisseur Collection".

The song "Independence Day," originally from their debut album, Waiting for a Miracle, was rerecorded for Land. "Will You Stay Tonight" and "Independence Day" received a reasonable amount of airplay and charted in the UK at No. 81 and No. 71, respectively. "Island Heart" was also released as a single.

Land was the first of two albums for the Jive label and was viewed as a major departure from the Comsats' first three albums. Frontman Stephen Fellows looked back in a 2006 interview: "We made more commercial albums in the mid-'80s because the record company wanted us to do so. We were happy to find a new label after the commercially not-so-successful first albums." He regretted the result, but their options seemed limited because of the pop music world at the time. "Indie didn’t really exist, so we had no choice. But in retrospect we should have [stuck] to our early sound". Bass player Kevin Bacon put it this way: "The demos we did for Land were really good. It was a weird time for us – we felt deflated after being dropped after three albums by Polydor. Eighties pop values were rife; we didn’t naturally fit in, but were all into being popular (pop) and felt we could achieve it in a more damning way. We didn’t think Land was crap at the time, we just didn’t think it was us".

== Track listing 1983 ==
All tracks written by Fellows/Glaisher/Bacon/Peake

1. "Will You Stay Tonight?" – 4:21
2. "Alicia (Can You Hear Me?)" – 3:54
3. "A World Away" – 5:11
4. "Independence Day" (re-recording) – 3:50
5. "Nature Trails" – 4:55
6. "Mister Memory" – 5:18
7. "Island Heart" – 3:54
8. "I Know That Feeling" – 5:20
9. "As Above, So Below" – 5:39

== Track listing 2001 ==
All tracks written by Fellows/Glaisher/Bacon/Peake

1. "Will You Stay Tonight?" – 4:21
2. "Alicia (Can You Hear Me?)" – 3:54
3. "A World Away" – 5:11
4. "Independence Day" (re-recording) – 3:50
5. "Nature Trails" – 4:55
6. "Mister Memory" – 5:18
7. "Island Heart" – 3:54
8. "I Know That Feeling" – 5:20
9. "As Above So Below" – 5:39
10. "A World Away" (Dub) – 4:57
11. "Shining Hour" – 4:29
12. "Island Heart" (Dub) – 6:00
13. "Scissors and the Stone" – 4:31
14. "Intelligence"* – 4:32

== Personnel ==
The Comsat Angels

- Stephen Fellows - vocals, guitar
- Andy Peake - synthesizer, vocals
- Kevin Bacon - bass guitar
- Mik Glaisher - drums
