= Fire on the Moon =

Fire on the Moon may refer to:

- Of a Fire on the Moon, 1970 book by Norman Mailer
- Fire on the Moon (Dream Command album), a 1990 album released by Comsat Angels under an alias
- Fire on the Moon (Mother's Army album)
