= 7 Day Weekend (album) =

Studio album by The Comsat Angels
- Released: 1985
- Recorded: Battery Studios, London
- Genre: New wave, post-punk
- Length: 43:02 (LP)
- Label: Jive
- Producer: Mike Howlett, James Mtume, Chris Tsangarides and The Comsat Angels

The Comsat Angels chronology
Land (1983)	7 Day Weekend (1985)	Chasing Shadows (1986)

Professional ratings
Review scores
Source	Rating
AllMusic	2/5 stars

7 Day Weekend is the Comsat Angels' fifth album, released in 1985 on Jive Records. The album was reissued on CD with bonus tracks in 2001 for Jive's "Connoisseur Collection".

The album was named after a song about unemployment which the band never recorded. Jive issued four singles from this album: "You Move Me" (summer 1984), "Day One" (October 1984), "I'm Falling" and "Forever Young" (both 1985). In the end, only "I'm Falling" ever charted in the UK, making it to No. 90, perhaps helped by being featured in the movie Real Genius.

In a 1997 interview, frontman Stephen Fellows was asked how he viewed 7 Day Weekend in comparison with the band's other Jive album, Land. He said, "I'm slightly happier with 7 Day Weekend. It took off in several strange directions. I'm very fond of 'Still It's Not Enough,' which is almost like blues or something. A weird soul song. And 'You Move Me' was a great live song".

Fellows went through some turmoil with the record label during production of the album. On the song "You Move Me," Jive arranged for an unknown session guitarist to replace Fellows' own work. Upon receiving a recording of it, he mailed it back to them in pieces. Soon after, the band and label parted company. Said Fellows, "They didn't understand us or care about us. They just wanted a hit pop group – to turn us into another Flock of Seagulls".

== Track listing ==
=== Original Release – 1985 ===
All tracks are written by Fellows, Glaisher, Bacon and Peake, except where noted

No.	Title	Writer(s)	Length
1.	"Believe It"		4:09
2.	"Forever Young"		3:59
3.	"You Move Me"		4:22
4.	"I'm Falling"	Fellows, Glaisher, Bacon, Peake, James Mtume	3:59
5.	"Close Your Eyes"		4:28
6.	"Day One"		4:01
7.	"You're the Heroine"		4:08
8.	"High Tide"		4:43
9.	"New Heart & Hand"		4:22
10.	"Still It's Not Enough"		4:51

=== Reissue – 2001 ===
All tracks are written by Fellows, Glaisher, Bacon and Peake, except where noted

No.	Title	Writer(s)	Length
1.	"Believe It"		4:09
2.	"Forever Young"		3:59
3.	"You Move Me"		4:22
4.	"I'm Falling"	Fellows, Glaisher, Bacon, Peake, James Mtume	3:59
5.	"Close Your Eyes"		4:28
6.	"Day One"		4:01
7.	"You're the Heroine"		4:08
8.	"High Tide"		4:43
9.	"New Heart & Hand"		4:22
10.	"Still It's Not Enough"		4:51
11.	"Land"		4:13
12.	"Citadel"	Mick Jagger, Keith Richards	3:10

== Personnel ==
The Comsat Angels

- Stephen Fellows – vocals, guitar
- Andy Peake – synthesizer, vocals
- Kevin Bacon – bass guitar
- Mik Glaisher – drums

with:

- Pete Q. Harris – Fairlight synthesizer
- Peter Beckett – vocals on "Believe It", "Forever Young" and "I'm Falling"
- Stevie Lange – vocals on "Day One"
