= To Before =

Compilation album by The Comsat Angels
- Released: 2007
- Recorded: 1978–1991
- Genre: Post-punk
- Length: 1:34:22
- Label: Renascent
- Producer: Kevin Bacon

Professional ratings
Review scores
Source	Rating
AllMusic	3.5/5 stars
PopMatters	4/10 stars

To Before is a double album of Comsat Angels demos and outtakes, released on CD by Renascent in 2007. The selected tracks covered the years 1978 to 1993 and were salvaged from old cassette tapes, DATs and bootlegs. The first disc documented some of the earliest years of the band and included the entire "Red Planet" three-track single, the Comsat Angels' first record. The second disc contains demo versions of songs from later albums, plus three finished tracks from the album Fire on the Moon.

Comsats frontman Stephen Fellows said of To Before, "Some of [the tracks] are a tad rough — it's a bit warts-and-all in places! But I guess it shows what we were trying to do".

== Track listing ==
=== Disc One ===
1. "Mass (Demo)" – 4:06
2. "Have You Seen (Demo)" – 3:03
3. "Work (Demo)" – 4:04
4. "I Get Excited" (B-side) – 2:56
5. "The House That... (Demo)" – 4:40
6. "Red Planet" (single A-side) – 2:41
7. "Specimen No 2" (B-side) – 2:29
8. "Eye of the Lens (Demo)" – 4:14
9. "You Never Learn (Demo)" – 3:31
10. "Tilted (Demo)" – 3:22
11. "Island Heart (Demo)" – 4:06
12. "Time to Burn (Demo)" – 4:19

=== Disc Two ===
1. "Lost Continent (Demo)" – 4:40
2. "Something's Got to Give (Demo)" – 3:49
3. "You Move Me (Demo)" – 3:51
4. "Carried Away (Demo)" – 4:12
5. "Born Again (Demo)" – 4:02
6. "Ice Sculpture" – 4:44
7. "She's Invisible" – 3:58
8. "Under the Influence (Demo)" – 4:26
9. "I.K.T.F. (Demo)" – 4:08
10. "Transport of Delight" – 3:24
11. "Venus Hunter (Demo)" – 6:09
12. "There's Something Going On (Demo)" – 3:28

== Personnel ==
- Stephen Fellows - vocals, guitar
- Andy Peake - synthesizer, vocals
- Kevin Bacon - bass guitar
- Mik Glaisher - drums
