= Mobile home (disambiguation) =

A mobile home is a prefabricated structure, often used as homes.

Mobile home can also refer to:

- Mobile Home (album), a 1999 album by Longpigs
- Mobile Home (film), a 2012 Belgian film
- Mobile Homes (film), a 2017 Canadian film

== See also ==
- Motorhome, a vehicle with living accommodation
