= The Sun Is Often Out =

1996 studio album by Longpigs

Studio album by Longpigs
- Released: 29 April 1996
- Recorded: 1995–1996
- Studio: Axis, Sheffield, England
- Genre: Britpop; alternative rock
- Length: 63:26
- Label: Mother
- Producer: Kevin Bacon; Jonathan Quarmby

Longpigs chronology
The Sun Is Often Out (1996)	Mobile Home (1999)

Singles from The Sun Is Often Out
- 1. "She Said" Released: 10 July 1995; 2. "Jesus Christ" Released: 9 October 1995; 3. "Far" Released: 29 January 1996; 4. "On and On" Released: 1 April 1996; 5. "She Said" Released: 10 June 1996 (reissue); 6. "Lost Myself" Released: 23 September 1996

The Sun Is Often Out (stylised as THE SUN iS OfTEN oUT) is the debut studio album by the English alternative rock band Longpigs, released on 29 April 1996 by the Irish rock band U2's record label, Mother Records. It peaked at number 26 on the UK Albums Chart.

The album's first two singles released in July and October 1995, "She Said" and "Jesus Christ", both failed to chart in the Top 40 on the UK Singles Chart, reaching number 67 and 61 instead. Its third single released in January 1996, "Far", entered the lower half of the Top 40, peaking at number 37 as well as receiving radio airplay, particularly from BBC Radio 1. The following single released in April, "On and On", was their breakthrough, charting at number 16. With the momentum of the album's release in April and the rerelease of "She Said" in June, also peaking at number 16, the final single released in September, "Lost Myself" stalled at number 22, breaking the streak of the band's Top 20 singles.

On 26 June 2020, the album was reissued on blue vinyl by Demon Records. Later on 19 October 2024, it was again reissued on yellow vinyl by Demon for National Album Day 2024.

== Critical reception ==
Professional ratings
Review scores
Source	Rating
AllMusic	4/5 stars
The Guardian	4/5 stars
The Phoenix	3/4 stars
Select	3/5

The Sun Is Often Out was ranked placed at number 32 in Melody Maker's top 50 best albums of 1996 list, by both critics and fans, and received a 4-star rating from AllMusic. BBC's Sean Adams praised the album when looking back on it in 2012.

== Track listing ==
All songs are written by Crispin Hunt except where noted.

No.	Title	Writer(s)	Length
1.	"Lost Myself"		5:04
2.	"She Said"		4:24
3.	"Far"		3:46
4.	"On and On"		4:10
5.	"Happy Again"		4:17
6.	"All Hype"	Crispin Hunt, Dee Boyle	3:23
7.	"Sally Dances"		3:44
8.	"Jesus Christ"		4:00
9.	"Dozen Wicked Words"		5:00
10.	"Elvis"		4:22
11.	"Over Our Bodies" (track ends at 7:05 and stays silent between this time and 17:05)		7:05
12.	"Sleep" (track starts at 17:05 and ends at 21:16)		4:10
Total length:			63:26

== Personnel ==
Personnel per booklet.

Longpigs

- Crispin Hunt – vocals, guitar
- Richard Hawley – guitar, vocals
- Simon Stafford – bass, piano, Hammond organ, vocals
- Dee Boyle – drums, vocals

Additional personnel

- Kevin Bacon – producer
- Jonathan Quarmby – producer
- Stephen Harris - engineering, mixing
- Hugh Jones – additional mixing, production (track 3)
- Gil Norton – additional mixing, production (track 4)
- Abraham Pants – design
- Orla Quirke – design
- Steven Stevlor – band photography
