= Sleep No More (The Comsat Angels album) =

Studio album by The Comsat Angels
- Released: 21 August 1981
- Recorded: March 1981
- Studio: Polydor Studios, London; Stratford Place
- Genre: Post-punk
- Length: 38:19
- Label: Polydor
- Producer: Peter Wilson and the Comsat Angels

The Comsat Angels chronology
Waiting for a Miracle (1980)	Sleep No More (1981)	Fiction (1982)

Professional ratings
Review scores
Source	Rating
AllMusic	4.5/5 stars
Smash Hits	8/10
Stylus Magazine	A+

Sleep No More is the Comsat Angels' second album, released 21 August 1981 on Polydor Records. It is widely regarded as a masterpiece that had a major influence on bands such as U2 (who toured with the band) and later groups such as Editors and Interpol. The album has been reissued on CD four times, in 1995 by RPM Records, in 2006 by Renascent, in 2015 by Edsel Records and in 2024 by Music on CD, each with different track listings (see below). Sleep No More produced no singles, but it had the highest UK chart ranking for any Comsats album, peaking at No. 51.

After the rushed production of the first album, Waiting for a Miracle, the band was able to put a lot more craft into Sleep No More. Frontman Stephen Fellows described how they achieved a resonant sound on a couple of the tracks: "Pete Wilson suggested taking the drums out of the studio – on the fourth floor at Polydor – and putting them near the lift-shaft (elevator shaft) by the stairs. We then put microphones on the three floors above and below ... Obviously we were only able to do this sort of thing in the evening when the offices were closed!"

Fellows felt the album Sleep No More had a unique quality among the band's work: "The only [album] which had a 'thread' through it was Sleep No More, the 'thread' was the sound we wanted to get." Critics recognized it as a great follow-up to Waiting for a Miracle. AllMusic later said, "Sleep No More is certainly more powerful, and it's also a greater achievement. Here The Comsat Angels became one of the era's exceptional bands." In a 1981 review, Mark Cooper of Sounds wrote that it was "an album that is head and shoulders above anything else recorded this year", while Jack Rabid of The Big Takeover summed up the album by saying, "I think Sleep No More is one of the greatest pieces of music ever released!"

When Sleep No More was released, it sold out very quickly. Unfortunately Polydor took two weeks to ship additional stock to the record stores, an issue which was believed to have had a negative effect on the album's momentum.

== Track listings ==
All tracks written by Fellows/Glaisher/Bacon/Peake.

=== 1981 ===
1. "The Eye Dance"
2. "Sleep No More"
3. "Be Brave"
4. "Gone"
5. "Dark Parade"
6. "Diagram"
7. "Restless"
8. "Goat of the West"
9. "Light Years"
10. "Our Secret"

=== 1995 ===
1. "Eye Dance"
2. "Sleep No More"
3. "Be Brave"
4. "Gone"
5. "Dark Parade"
6. "Diagram"
7. "Restless"
8. "Goat of the West"
9. "Light Years"
10. "Our Secret"
11. "Eye of the Lens"
12. "Another World"
13. "At Sea"
14. "(Do the) Empty House"
15. "Red Planet Revisited"

=== 2006 ===
1. "The Eye Dance"
2. "Sleep No More"
3. "Be Brave"
4. "Gone"
5. "Dark Parade"
6. "Diagram"
7. "Restless"
8. "Goat of the West"
9. "Light Years"
10. "Our Secret"
11. "Eye of the Lens"
12. "Another World"
13. "At Sea"
14. "Mass"
15. "Dark Parade 1" (Demo)
16. "Goat of the West" (Demo)
17. "Be Brave" (Demo)
18. "Gone" (Alternative EP version)

=== 2015 ===
CD 1
1. "Eye Dance"
2. "Sleep No More"
3. "Be Brave"
4. "Gone"
5. "Dark Parade"
6. "Diagram"
7. "Restless"
8. "Goat of the West"
9. "Light Years"
10. "Our Secret"

Bonus Tracks

11. "Eye of the Lens"
12. "Another World"
13. "At Sea"
CD 2
1. "Mass"
2. "Dark Parade 1" (Demo)
3. "Goat of the West" (Demo)
4. "Be Brave" (Demo)
5. "Gone" (Alternative EP Version)

John Peel Session

6. "Be Brave"
7. "At Sea"
8. "Eye of the Lens"
9. "Dark Parade"

Richard Skinner Show

10. "Gone"
11. "Total War"
12. "Eye Dance"
13. "Be Brave"

=== 2024 ===
1. "The Eye Dance"
2. "Sleep No More"
3. "Be Brave"
4. "Gone"
5. "Dark Parade"
6. "Diagram"
7. "Restless"
8. "Goat of the West"
9. "Light Years"
10. "Our Secret"

Bonus tracks

11. "Eye of the Lens"
12. "Another World"
13. "At Sea"
14. "(Do The) Empty House"
15. "Red Planet Revisited"

== Personnel ==
The members of the Comsat Angels are:

- Stephen Fellows – vocals, guitar, artwork
- Andy Peake – synthesizer, vocals
- Kevin Bacon – bass guitar
- Mik Glaisher – drums
