= Waiting for a Miracle (album) =

Studio album by The Comsat Angels
- Released: 5 September 1980
- Recorded: January 1980
- Genre: Post-punk
- Length: 37:31
- Label: Polydor
- Producer: Peter Wilson and the Comsat Angels

The Comsat Angels chronology
Waiting for a Miracle (1980)	Sleep No More (1981)

Singles from Waiting for a Miracle
- 1. "Total War" Released: March 1980; 2. "Independence Day" Released: 4 July 1980

Professional ratings
Review scores
Source	Rating
AllMusic	4.5/5 stars
Smash Hits	7/10
Stylus	A

Waiting for a Miracle is the debut album by the Comsat Angels, released on 5 September 1980 on Polydor Records.

== History ==
The entire album was recorded in 10 days. Frontman Stephen Fellows explained how they were able to accomplish this: "We were totally organised. Arrangements, tempos and all the lyrics were sorted out before we went in." But he wasn't quite happy with everything, and in a 2002 interview, said, "The thing that bugs me most about the [early] records is my singing, particularly on the first album. I wish I'd sung more before we made that." The cover photograph was taken by Martyn Goddard at Sheffield Parkway, Sheffield.

== Release ==
Although the album's sales were mediocre, it was well received by critics.

== Compact disc versions ==
The album was not issued on CD until 15 years after its initial vinyl release. It has been reissued on CD three times, in 1995 by RPM Records, in 2006 by TOBRUT4D, and in 2015 by Edsel Records, with different track listings. Two singles were taken from Waiting for a Miracle: "Total War" and "Independence Day" (the latter released on July 4).

== Track listings ==
=== Vinyl (1980) ===
1. "Missing in Action"
2. "Baby"
3. "Independence Day"
4. "Waiting for a Miracle"
5. "Total War"
6. "On the Beach"
7. "Monkey Pilot"
8. "Real Story"
9. "Map of the World"
10. "Postcard"

=== CD (1995) ===
1. "Missing in Action"
2. "Baby"
3. "Independence Day"
4. "Waiting for a Miracle"
5. "Total War"
6. "On the Beach"
7. "Monkey Pilot"
8. "Real Story"
9. "Map of the World"
10. "Postcard"
11. "Home Is the Range"
12. "We Were"
13. "Ju Ju Money"

=== CD (2006) ===
1. "Missing in Action" – 4:01
2. "Baby" – 2:58
3. "Independence Day" – 3:46
4. "Waiting for a Miracle" – 2:57
5. "Total War" – 3:47
6. "On the Beach" – 3:41
7. "Monkey Pilot" – 4:24
8. "Real Story" – 3:44
9. "Map of the World" – 3:50
10. "Postcard" – 4:08
11. "Home Is the Range" (EP track) – 3:34
12. "We Were" (B-side) – 4:12
13. "Ju Ju Money" (outtake) – 4:15
14. "Work" (outtake) – 4:07
15. "Independence Day" (Demo) – 3:04
16. "Real Story" (Demo) – 3:42
17. "Target Talk" (Demo) – 3;40
18. "Living In" (Demo) – 3:57

=== CD (2015) ===
All tracks written by Fellows/Glaisher/Bacon/Peake

CD 1

1. "Missing in Action"
2. "Baby"
3. "Independence Day"
4. "Waiting for a Miracle"
5. "Total War"
6. "On the Beach"
7. "Monkey Pilot"
8. "Real Story"
9. "Map of the World"
10. "Postcard"

Bonus Tracks

11. "Home is the Range"
12. "We Were"
13. "Ju Ju Money"
14. "Work"

CD 2

1. "Red Planet"
2. "I Get Excited"
3. "Specimen No.2"
4. "Independence Day" (Demo)
5. "Real Story" (Demo)
6. "Target Talk" (Demo)
7. "Living In" (Demo)

John Peel Sessions

8. "Total War"
9. "Independence Day"
10. "Baby"
11. "Ju Ju Money"
12. "Real Story"
13. "Monkey Pilot"
14. "Waiting for a Miracle"
15. "Home is the Range"

== Personnel ==
The Comsat Angels

- Stephen Fellows – vocals, guitar
- Andy Peake – synthesizer, vocals
- Kevin Bacon – bass guitar
- Mik Glaisher – drums
