= Magonia (disambiguation) =

Magonia is a cloud realm in a French medieval folk tale. It may also refer to:

- Magonia (plant), a genus of plants
- Magonia, a novel by Maria Dahvana Headley
- "Magonia", a song on the 2007 release of the Comsat Angels' album My Mind's Eye

== See also ==
- Mahonia, another genus of plants
