= Four Weddings and a Funeral (soundtrack) =

1994 film soundtrack album

Soundtrack album by Richard Rodney Bennett
- Released: 31 May 1994
- Genre: Brit-pop; classical; rock
- Length: 59:29 (UK); 40:21 (US)
- Label: Vertigo

The soundtrack to the 1994 film Four Weddings and a Funeral directed by Mike Newell, features 13 licensed songs as heard in the film performed by artists such as Elton John, Gloria Gaynor, Lena Fiagbe, Barry White, along with bands such as Wet Wet Wet, Swing Out Sister, Gladys Knight & the Pips, Squeeze, One to One and Sting amongst others. It also featured a score suite composed by British composer Richard Rodney Bennett. The album achieved significant chart-topping success in the United Kingdom.

== Track listing ==
UK version
No.	Title	Artist(s)	Length
1.	"Love Is All Around"	Wet Wet Wet	3:59
2.	"But Not For Me"	Elton John	2:59
3.	"You're The First, My Last, My Everything"	Barry White	3:35
4.	"Smoke Gets in Your Eyes"	Nu Colours	4:25
5.	"I Will Survive"	Gloria Gaynor	3:49
6.	"La La La (Means I Love You)"	Swing Out Sister	4:45
7.	"Crocodile Rock"	Elton John	3:54
8.	"The Right Time"	1 To 1	3:29
9.	"It Should Have Been Me"	Gladys Knight & the Pips	3:04
10.	"Loving You Tonight"	Squeeze	4:49
11.	"Can't Smile Without You"	Lena Fiagbe	4:19
12.	"Four Weddings And A Funeral / Funeral Blues (Note: Featuring three suites: Carrie's Bedroom, Before The Funeral, After The Funeral, The Morning After, Love In The Rain)"	Richard Rodney Bennett	10:35
13.	"The Secret Marriage"	Sting	2:01
14.	"Chapel Of Love"	Elton John	3:46
Total length:			59:29

US version
No.	Title	Artist(s)	Length
1.	"Love Is All Around"	Wet Wet Wet	3:59
2.	"But Not for Me"	Elton John	3:01
3.	"The Right Time"	1 to 1	3:29
4.	"Smoke Gets in Your Eyes"	Nu Colours	4:26
5.	"I Will Survive"	Gloria Gaynor	3:53
6.	"Crocodile Rock"	Elton John	3:55
7.	"La La La (Means I Love You)"	Swing Out Sister	5:06
8.	"Loving You Tonight"	Squeeze	4:49
9.	"The Secret Marriage"	Sting	2:09
10.	"Chapel of Love"	Elton John	3:42
11.	"After the Funeral"	W. H. Auden poem read by John Hannah	1:52
Total length:			40:21

== Reception ==
William Ruhlmann of AllMusic wrote "the film itself ends on a more up note, and you can always program your CD player to play only the wedding material." Jonathan Broxton of Movie Music UK wrote "Four Weddings and a Funeral is probably a soundtrack that will appeal mostly to people like me, who are fans of the film and/or are devotees of 1980s and 90s British pop music, but it does comes a gentle but important reminder that Richard Rodney Bennett’s career did extend deeply into the 1990s, and that he was still writing music of great tenderness, emotional depth, and poignancy long after his ‘mainstream’ Hollywood career ended."

== Chart performance ==
Weekly chart performance for Four Weddings and a Funeral
Chart (1994–1995)	Peak position
Australian Albums (ARIA)	4
Austrian Albums (Ö3 Austria)	12
Danish Albums (Hitlisten)	36
New Zealand Albums (RMNZ)	12
Scottish Albums (OCC)	5
Swiss Albums (Schweizer Hitparade)	23
UK Compilation Albums (OCC)	7

Year-end chart performance for Four Weddings and a Funeral
Chart (1994)	Position
Australian Albums (ARIA)	35
UK Albums (OCC)	51
UK Compilations Albums (OCC)	10

== Certifications ==
Certifications and sales for Four Weddings and a Funeral
Region	Certification	Certified units/sales
Australia (ARIA)	Platinum	70,000^{^}
United Kingdom (BPI)	Platinum	300,000^{^}
^{*} Sales figures based on certification alone.^{^} Shipments figures based on certification alone.
