= My Mind's Eye (album) =

My Mind’s Eye

Studio album by The Comsat Angels
- Released: 1992
- Recorded: 1991
- Studio: Axis Studio, Sheffield
- Genre: Post-punk
- Length: 39:17 (1993); 62:15 (2007)
- Label: RPM Records (1992), Caroline Records US (1993)
- Producer: The Comsat Angels

The Comsat Angels chronology
Fire on the Moon (1990)	My Mind’s Eye (1992)	The Glamour (1995)

Professional ratings
Review scores
Source	Rating
AllMusic	4/5 stars
PopMatters	7/10 stars

My Mind's Eye is the eighth album by the Comsat Angels, released in 1992 on RPM Records, and in 1993 on Caroline Records in the United States. It was rereleased by Thunderbird Records in 2001, and remastered with additional tracks by Renascent in February 2007.

This was the last album the Comsat Angels produced with their original lineup. Around the time My Mind’s Eye was released, bass player Kevin Bacon was devoting more time to his career as a music producer. Mick Glaisher became increasingly frustrated with the bands progress and left the band - to return at a later date on condition that Bacon was no longer part of the band. For some of the tracks, Bacon was not involved in the writing and only came in to record them. He was replaced by Terry Todd for the band's last album and tour in 1994-95.

When Comsats frontman Stephen Fellows was asked which of the band's albums was his favorite, he named My Mind's Eye. In a 1997 interview, Fellows said, "My Mind’s Eye for me is the sort of apex of the group and although it didn't do that well and there wasn't a great deal of press surrounding it, the reviews we got for that were among the best we ever had".

== Track listings ==
All tracks written by Fellows/Glaisher/Bacon/Peake, except "Driving", "Beautiful Monster", "My Mind's Eye" and "Route 666", which were written by Fellows/Glaisher/Peake.

=== 1992/1993/2001 ===
1. "Driving" – 4:33
2. "Beautiful Monster" – 2:24
3. "Shiva Descending" – 4:09
4. "My Mind's Eye" – 3:26
5. "I Come from the Sun" – 6:10
6. "Field of Tall Flowers" – 3:15
7. "Always Near" – 3:25
8. "Route 666" – 3:18
9. "Mystery Plane" – 3:03
10. "And All the Stars" – 4:27

=== 2007 ===
1. "Driving (Alt Mix)" – 4:29
2. "Always Near" – 3:25
3. "Beautiful Monster" – 2:24
4. "Shiva Descending" – 4:09
5. "My Mind's Eye" – 3:26
6. "I Come from the Sun" – 6:10
7. "Field of Tall Flowers (Acc Mix)" – 3:13
8. "Route 666" – 3:18
9. "Mystery Plane" – 3:03
10. "And All the Stars" – 4:27
11. "Magonia" (B-side) – 3:26
12. "Too Much Time" (B-side) – 3:59
13. "There Is No Enemy" (B-side) – 4:42
14. "My Mind’s Eye (The Wind, the Bass, the Drums)" (B-side) – 3:09
15. "Field of Tall Flowers (Original Mix)" – 3:15
16. "Driving (Original Mix)" – 4:33

== Personnel ==
- Stephen Fellows – vocals, guitar
- Andy Peake – synthesizer, vocals
- Kevin Bacon – bass guitar
- Mik Glaisher – drums
