= Gotta Get It Right =

Single by Lena Fiagbe

from the album Visions
- Released: 1993
- Genre: Pop
- Length: 3:47
- Label: Mother Records
- Songwriters: Lena Fiagbe; Steve Byrd
- Producers: Lena Fiagbe; Martyn Ware

Lena Fiagbe singles chronology
"You Come from Earth" (1993)	"Gotta Get It Right" (1993)	"What's It Like to Be Beautiful" (1994)

Music video
- "Gotta Get It Right" on YouTube

"Gotta Get It Right" is a song by British pop-soul singer-songwriter Lena Fiagbe, released in 1993 by Mother Records as the second single from her debut album, Visions (1994). The song was written by Fiagbe with Steve Byrd and she also co-produced it with Martyn Ware. It became her biggest hit in the UK, peaking at number 20 on the UK Singles Chart, as well as reaching number one on the Record Mirror Club Chart.

== Critical reception ==
Paul Sexton from Billboard magazine noted that the song "combined acoustic guitar and piano with a driving pop beat and Fiagbe's ecologically aware lyrics." Machgiel Bakker from Music & Media described it as "gently swaying". Alan Jones from Music Week gave "Gotta Get It Right" a score of four out of five, writing, "Reclaiming the surname she shed for her acclaimed debut single 'You Come from Earth', the fast-rising star has already topped the Club Chart with this less classy but more immediate follow-up, a semi-acoustic shuffle in its immediately accessible radio mix. Very different Well Hung Parliament mixes take care of dance fans. A smash." Another Music Week editor, Andy Beevers, gave it three out of five, adding, "This single from the London-based singer brings together her soulful plea for a fairer world with a range of fashionably funky house mixes from Paul Gotel. Not surprisingly, it is making a strong Club Chart showing."

== Charts ==
=== Weekly charts ===
Chart (1993)	Peak position
Australia (ARIA)	156
Europe (Eurochart Hot 100)	66
Europe (European Hit Radio)	38
UK Singles (OCC)	20
UK Airplay (Music Week)	7
UK Dance (Music Week)	2
UK Club Chart (Music Week)	1

=== Year-end charts ===
Chart (1993)	Position
UK Club Chart (Music Week)	34
