= Fireworks City =

Studio album by Audioweb
- Released: August 1998
- Recorded: 1998
- Label: Mother
- Producer: Stephen Lironi

Audioweb chronology
Audioweb (1996)	Fireworks City (1998)

Professional ratings
Review scores
Source	Rating
Select	4/5 stars

Fireworks City is the second album by English musical group Audioweb, produced by Stephen Lironi and released in 1998 by Mother Records.

== Track listing ==
1. "Policeman Skank... (The Story of My Life)"
2. "Test the Theory"
3. "Personal Feeling"
4. "Try"
5. "Sentiments for a Reason"
6. "Soul On Fire"
7. "Freefall"
8. "Out of Many"
9. "Control"
10. "Out of My Mind"
11. "Get Out of Here"
