= Audioweb =

English indie rock band

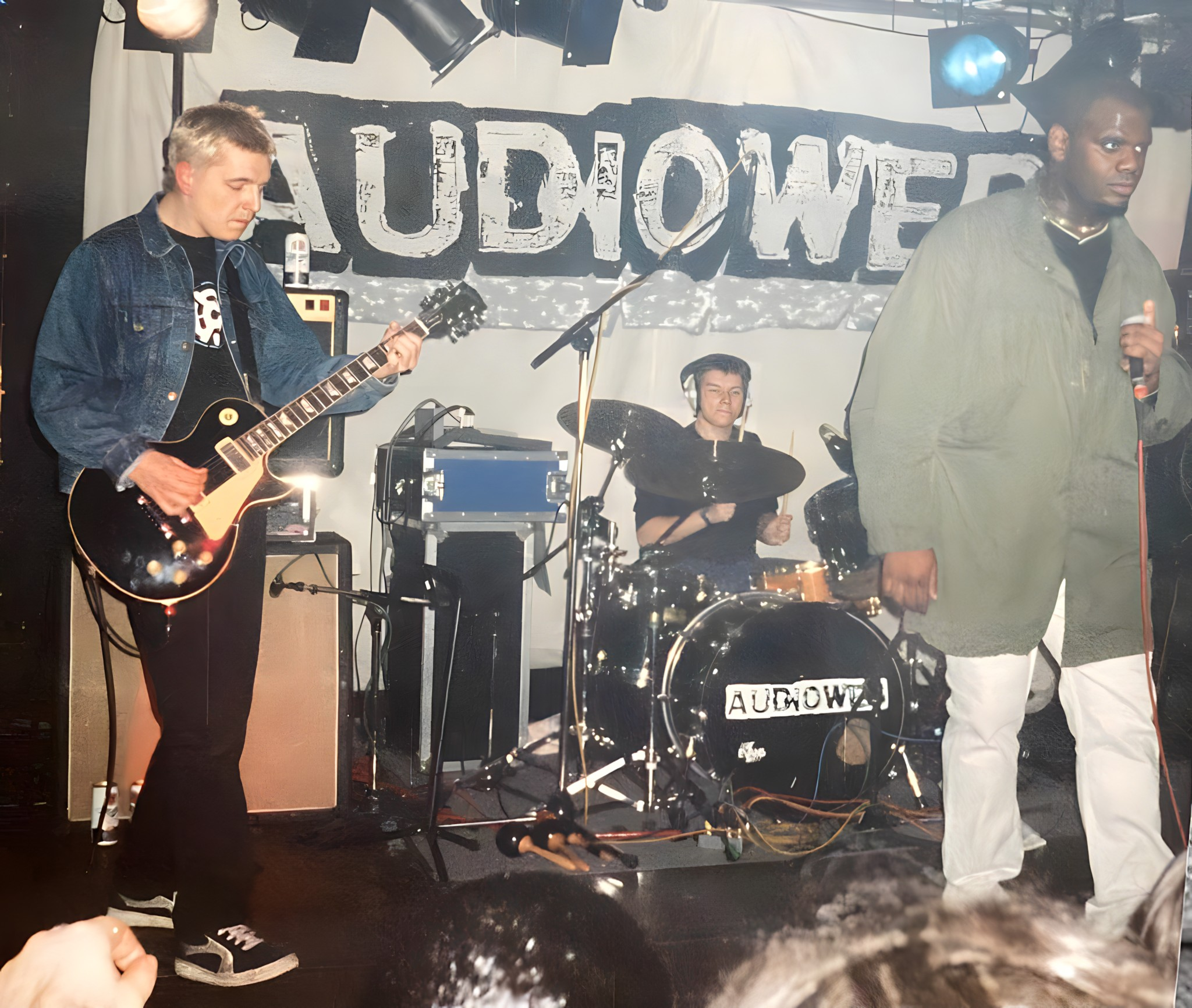

Background information
- Origin: Manchester, England
- Genres: Indie rock; reggae rock; electronica; Britpop
- Years active: 1991–2000, 2016–present
- Label: Mother
- Members: Martin Merchant; Sean McCann; Andreas Millns; Chris Hills; Jake Bradford-Sharp
- Past members: Rob Maxfield; Robin File

Audioweb are an English indie rock band, formed in 1991 in Manchester. They were initially called The Sugar Merchants.

== Career ==
Audioweb scored two Top 20 hits in the UK Singles Chart - "Policeman Skank...(The Story Of My Life)", and a cover version of The Clash's "Bankrobber". Famous admirers of the group were U2 and Ian Brown. Audioweb supported U2 at Wembley Stadium in August 1997. Prior to this Stadium gig they supported Cast at Glasgow's Barrowlands in March 1997. They also supported Madness at Madstock '96 at Finsbury Park, London. Audioweb released their material on the Mother Records label.

The band went on an extended hiatus after 2000. Bassist McCann played for Ian Brown and Badly Drawn Boy and released his own music under the name Fellow Traveller; Maxfield has drummed for Ian Brown and Shed Seven; File has been working with the singer-songwriter Finley Quaye; while Merchant's 2007 - 2013 Manchester band, SupaJamma have released one mini album "That Was Then, This is Now" & four singles, "Madaboutit, It's Alright, Hope & Pray, We Run Tings" on Stereokill Recordings. Merchant is also the vocalist on the theme tune for the BBC show Rastamouse.

Audioweb reformed in 2016. The band's first live performance after reforming was on 18 June 2016 at Manchester City F.C.'s Etihad Stadium, supporting The Stone Roses. The reformation was derailed in September 2017 when frontman Martin Merchant was charged with three counts of possession of a firearm and one count of possession of ammunition, and sentenced at Manchester Magistrates’ Court.

Nevertheless, the single "King" was released in 2021, followed by the "I/O Volume 1" in March 2023.

New single, "The Only One", was released on 6 October 2023 to critical acclaim.

In spring 2025, Audioweb played a short sold-out run of UK shows, followed by sets at the Shiiine On and Bearded Theory festivals. In October 2025, the band announced that they had signed with booking agency Runway Artists and had returned to the studio to complete work on a new album scheduled for release in 2026.

== Personnel ==
- Martin "Sugar" Merchant (vocals)
- Sean McCann (bass)
- Andreas Millns (keyboards)
- Chris Hills (guitar)
- Jake Bradford-Sharp (drums)

== Discography ==
=== Albums ===
- Audioweb (1996) UK No. 70
- Fireworks City (1998)

=== Singles ===
- "Sleeper" (1995) UK No. 74
- "Yeah?" (1996) UK No. 73
- "Into my World" (1996) UK No. 42
- "Sleeper" (remix) (1996) UK No. 50
- "Bankrobber" (1997) UK No. 19
- "Faker" (1997) UK No. 70
- "Policeman Skank... (The Story of My Life)" (1998) UK No. 21
- "Personal Feeling" (1998) UK No. 65
- "Get Out of Here" (1998)
- "Test the Theory" (1999) UK No. 56
- "King" (2021)
- "The Only One" (2023)
- "The Ghosts of Manchester" (2026)
