= An Emotional Fish (album) =

Studio album by An Emotional Fish
- Released: 1990
- Genre: Rock
- Label: East West/Atlantic
- Producer: Tim Palmer

An Emotional Fish chronology
An Emotional Fish (1990)	Celebration Live (1991)

Singles from An Emotional Fish
- 1. "Celebrate" Released: 1989; 2. "Grey Matter" Released: 1989

An Emotional Fish is the debut album by the Irish band An Emotional Fish, released in 1990. It peaked at No. 40 on the UK Albums Chart. The first single was "Celebrate", which was followed by "Grey Matter". The band supported the album with UK and North American tours that included playing the CMJ Music Marathon.

== Production ==
Produced by Tim Palmer, the album was recorded in Dublin. The band chose Palmer because they admired his ability to capture a "live" sound. Many of the tracks feature a reverbed guitar effect. Most of the songs were written by frontman Gerard Whelan, who steered away from traditional Irish music influences. "Brick It Up" is about the problems that arise in social conversations.

== Critical reception ==
Professional ratings
Review scores
Source	Rating
AllMusic	4.5/5 stars
Calgary Herald	B+
The Daily Illini	2.5/5 stars
Dayton Daily News	3/4 stars
The Encyclopedia of Popular Music	3/5 stars
The Ottawa Citizen	3/5 stars

The Ottawa Citizen noted that "when it succeeds, An Emotional Fish is a band of superb collage artists... They paste everyone else's best ideas together to make a pretty picture." The Calgary Herald opined that "Whelan has a moody touch, like Jim Morrison or the early Lou Reed". The Boston Globe praised "Celebrate", calling it "one of the best singles of the season." The Toronto Star labeled the music "tough, guitar-based rock".

The Washington Post considered the album "mainstream rock with an occasional country aroma". The Gazette praised the "earthiness grounding all the guitar atmospherics." The Los Angeles Times said that "Whelan is an intriguing front man blessed with an elastic voice". Trouser Press concluded that "a lot of An Emotional Fish is the sketchbook of untalented amateurs attempting to jot down the work of a master".

== Track listing ==
No.	Title	Length
1.	"Celebrate"
2.	"Grey Matter"
3.	"Blue"
4.	"Lace Virginia"
5.	"Julian"
6.	"All I Am"
7.	"Change"
8.	"Colours"
9.	"That Demon Jive"
10.	"Brick It Up"
11.	"Move On"
