= Urban Beaches =

Studio album by Cactus World News
- Released: 1986
- Recorded: 1986
- Studio: Wisseloord Studios; Windmill Lane Studios
- Genre: New wave
- Label: MCA Records
- Producer: Chris Kimsey

Cactus World News chronology
Urban Beaches (1986)	No Shelter (2004)

Singles from Urban Beaches
- 1. "Years Later" Released: 1986; 2. "Worlds Apart" Released: 1986; 3. "The Bridge" Released: 1986

Professional ratings
Review scores
Source	Rating
AllMusic	4.5/5 stars

Urban Beaches is the debut album by Cactus World News, released in 1986 on MCA Records.

The album peaked at No. 56 on the UK Albums Chart and No. 180 on the US Billboard 200.

== Track listing ==
All tracks are written by Cactus World News

Side A
No.	Title	Length
1.	"Worlds Apart"	3:36
2.	"In a Whirlpool"	3:36
3.	"The Promise"	5:03
4.	"The Bridge"	4:15
5.	"State of Emergency"	7:10

Side B
No.	Title	Length
6.	"Years Later"	4:10
7.	"Church of the Cold"	3:49
8.	"Pilots of Beka"	6:04
9.	"Jigsaw Street"	3:19
10.	"Maybe This Time"	7:00

== Personnel ==
Cactus World News

- Eoin McEvoy - guitar, lead vocals
- Fergal MacAindris - bass
- Wayne Sheehy - drums, percussion
- Frank Kearns - guitar

Additional musicians

- Joan Whyte - backing vocals (5)
- Niamh Whyte - backing vocals (5)

Production

- Producer: Chris Kimsey
- Engineer: Mary Kettle, Mark Freegard, Thomas Stiehler
- Art direction and illustration: Brian Griffin, Conor Horgan

== Charts ==
Album

Year	Chart	Position
1986	UK Albums Chart	56
1986	US Billboard 200	180

Singles

Year	Single	Chart	Position
1986	"Years Later"	UK Singles Chart	59
1986	"Worlds Apart"	UK Singles Chart	58
1986	"The Bridge"	UK Singles Chart	74
