= Mobile Home (album) =

Studio album by Longpigs
- Released: 11 October 1999
- Genre: Alternative rock
- Label: Mother
- Producer: Kevin Bacon and Jonathan Quarmby except tracks 2, 6, 10 and 13 produced by Stephen Street and tracks 3 and 8, additional production and mix by Stephen Street

Longpigs chronology
The Sun Is Often Out (1996)	Mobile Home (1999)	On and On: The Anthology (2013)

Singles from Mobile Home
- 1. "Blue Skies" Released: 1999; 2. "The Frank Sonata" Released: 1999

Professional ratings
Review scores
Source	Rating
AllMusic	1.5/5 stars
NME	4/5 stars

Mobile Home is the second and final album by Longpigs, released in 1999 on U2's record label, Mother.

== Track listing ==
All songs written by Crispin Hunt unless otherwise stated.

1. "The Frank Sonata" – 3:53
2. "Blue Skies" – 4:01
3. "Gangsters" – 4:56
4. "Free Toy" (Hunt, Richard Hawley) – 4:43
5. "Baby Blue" (Hunt, Simon Stafford) – 3:56
6. "Dance Baby Dance" (Hunt, Hawley, Stafford) – 4:17
7. "Miss Believer" – 4:22
8. "I Lied I Love You" – 4:43
9. "Keep the Light Alight" – 3:40
10. "Speech Bubble" – 3:47
11. "Dog Is Dead" – 4:02
12. "Loud and Clear" (Hunt, Hawley) – 3:10
13. "In the Snow" – 4:30

Bonus tracks on Japanese Edition
No.	Title	Length
14.	"Headaches" (B-side to "Blue Skies" single)	3:07
15.	"Seventies, Just Passing Over" (B-side to "Blue Skies" single)	3:37
16.	"I Love You" (B-side to "Blue Skies" single)	3:43
