= Junk Puppets =

Studio album by An Emotional Fish
- Released: 1993
- Genre: Alternative rock; noise pop; Celtic rock
- Label: Atlantic
- Producer: Alan Moulder, David A. Stewart, An Emotional Fish

An Emotional Fish chronology
Celebration Live (1991)	Junk Puppets (1993)	Sloper (1995)

Junk Puppets is the second album by the Irish band An Emotional Fish, released in 1993.

"Rain" peaked at No. 15 on Billboard's Modern Rock Tracks chart. The band supported the album with a North American tour.

== Production ==
The album was produced by Alan Moulder, David A. Stewart, and the band. Like U2's Achtung Baby, to which it was often compared, Junk Puppets presented a more dance-oriented sound.

== Critical reception ==
Professional ratings
Review scores
Source	Rating
AllMusic	3/5 stars
Calgary Herald	B
The Encyclopedia of Popular Music	2/5 stars
The Morning Star	2.5/5 stars

Trouser Press thought that the album "maps out a dramatic, kinetic surge of pointed, textured rhythmic noise-pop that is, at times, not entirely unlike the clamorous sound of U2's Achtung Baby." The Washington Post opined: "Practitioners of the sort of eclecticism that doesn't seem to add up to much, the members of An Emotional Fish make music on their new Junk Puppets that ranges from electro-noisy ('Rain', 'Yeh Yeh Yeh') to conventionally bombastic (the string-laden 'Careless Child')." The Manchester Evening News concluded that it "never really steps out of the shadow of [the U2] comparison."

The Times deemed the album "good Celtic rock with a real kick," but acknowledged that "the bold, anthemic qualities of some numbers may not be to everyone's taste." The Calgary Herald determined that the band "keep the edge on an otherwise unstable amount of musical aspects ... The intense mixture works because the songs flow naturally from beginning to end." The Dallas Morning News called the songs "pleasant, boring and forgettable—just the ticket for 'alternative' stations."

AllMusic wrote that the band "scrounge bits of epic pop, psychedelia, funk, and electro-dance and scatter them on the display shelf in a prize fusion of guitars and technology, modern swagger and respectful acknowledgement."

== Track listing ==
No.	Title	Length
1.	"Rain"
2.	"Harmony Central"
3.	"Sister Change"
4.	"If God Was a Girl"
5.	"Careless Child"
6.	"Star"
7.	"Hole in My Heaven"
8.	"Innocence"
9.	"Half Moon"
10.	"Digging This Hole"
11.	"Yeh Yeh Yeh"
