= The Comsat Angels =

English post-punk band

- Also known as: Dream Command
- Origin: Sheffield, England
- Genres: Post-punk, new wave
- Years active: 1978–1995, 2009–2010
- Labels: Polydor, Jive, Island, RPM, Renascent
- Past members: Stephen Fellows; Mik Glaisher; Kevin Bacon; Andy Peake; Nick Robinson; Simon Anderson; Terry Todd
- Website: www.comsatangels.org

The Comsat Angels were an English post-punk band from Sheffield, South Yorkshire, initially active from 1978 to 1995. Their music has been described as "abstract pop songs with sparse instrumentation, many of which were bleak and filled with some form of heartache". They have been credited as being an influence on later post-punk revival bands such as Blacklist, Bell Hollow, Editors and Interpol.

The Comsat Angels toured heavily in the UK and western Europe, especially in the Netherlands; the band's two concerts in August 1982 in Iceland had a strong influence on the music scene in Reykjavík. They also toured the United States twice. Their music has been extensively reissued and recompiled since 1995 by various record labels.

== History ==
=== Early years ===
Named after the J. G. Ballard short story "The Comsat Angels", the foursome's original lineup (lasting from 1978 to 1992) consisted of Stephen Fellows (vocals, guitar), Mik Glaisher (drums), Kevin Bacon (bass) and Andy Peake – (keyboards).

They debuted in 1979 with the "Red Planet" three-track single. This release attracted Polydor A&R man Frank Neilson and the band signed a three-album recording contract. These three albums – Waiting for a Miracle (1980), which included the single "Independence Day", probably their best known song, Trouser Press reported in a review that "Waiting For a Miracle" was hailed in one UK paper as the greatest debut LP of all time, it remains a stunning masterwork,Sleep No More (1981) and Fiction (1982) – are regarded by some as their best, but only sold modestly.

In their early years, the group shared live stages with bands like Siouxsie and the Banshees, Yellow Magic Orchestra, Depeche Mode, U2 (an 18-date tour in 1981), Captain Beefheart, the Sound, Wall of Voodoo and Gang of Four. In 1982, they performed two songs on BBC Television's the Old Grey Whistle Test. A U.S. tour in 1982 had to be cancelled after a week, due to Bacon contracting appendicitis.

=== C.S. Angels ===
In 1982, a US-based company Communications Satellite Corporation wrote a series of letters to the band's management saying that "the word Comsat was a registered trade mark in America and that the group had no authority to use the name." The name Comsat Angels was actually taken from a short story written by J. G. Ballard. As a result of the threatened lawsuit, the band was forced to perform and release their records in the U.S. under the name "the C.S. Angels". The band also performed once in Sheffield, England in 1987 under the name "the Headhunters".

=== Jive years ===
The first three albums failed to live up to Polydor's expectations, so the record label let the band go. They then signed with Jive Records and recorded Land (1983), which had a more commercial, new wave-oriented sound. The album included the single "Will You Stay Tonight?" which had some success on US radio and reached no 81 in the UK charts. In the wake of this unexpected success Independence Day was rereleased and peaked at no 75.

Fifth album 7 Day Weekend (1985) also followed a more pop-oriented trend. However, it also failed on the charts, and Jive Records dropped the band. Their single "I'm Falling" was featured nearly in its entirety in the movie Real Genius with Val Kilmer. The movie never released an official soundtrack album, but gave the band perhaps its widest audience.

=== Change of label ===
The band found a fan and supporter in Robert Palmer (a fellow Yorkshireman), who was at the height of his popularity at this point in the 1980s. Palmer facilitated the Comsat Angels' signing to Island Records, and he served as executive producer for their next album, Chasing Shadows (1986) and even sang on one song, "You'll Never Know". That album's music is viewed as the band's return to their dark, brooding roots.

=== Change of name to Dream Command ===
For the follow-up, they talked Island into letting them build their own studio. The band decided to try for AOR radio with their next recording, Fire on the Moon (1990). The group changed its name to Dream Command for this record, likely because of pressure from their record label and the Communications Satellite Corporation.

Neither the band nor their label were happy with the album, which was released in small quantities in the US and the Netherlands only. They also released the single, "Celestine" (1990, Island Records). They never performed live with this name and never used it again. Few people in the UK even knew about it until the Comsats were mentioned in Q magazine's "Where Are They Now?" section.

Afterwards, the band resumed using the name the Comsat Angels.

=== Second change of label ===
Around 1990, they recruited Sheffield musician Nick Robinson as an additional guitarist. (He appeared on "I Wanna Destroy You", later released on the compilation From Beyond 2). This was another turning point for the band, as they set about writing and recording new material on their own terms and finally hooked up with RPM Records (and with Caroline Records in the U.S.), who then released the Comsats' 1979-84 BBC Radio 1 sessions as Time Considered as a Helix of Semi-Precious Stones. (The title was taken from a Samuel R. Delany short story.)

RPM released a new Comsats single, "Driving", and an album, My Mind's Eye, in 1992. (The album was released in the U.S. on Caroline Records, under the band name C.S. Angels, with two bonus tracks.) The music press praised the album, citing several current shoegaze-type bands (e.g., Curve, Catherine Wheel) who were influenced by the Comsats' sound. Melody Maker's review stated:

"My Mind's Eye could easily have been recorded by ghosts, such is the dexterity of The Comsats' approach and the haunted nature of their anguished restraint... Every snapping bassline and icebound guitar fragment has a place, a purity and a passion that chills... At the heart of their hurtling hailstorm lies Steve Fellows' punishing baritone. The man sounds like he's singing from a carriage on the soul train to hell, all sweat and worry as the songs rage around him like they've come for a debt".

RPM also issued a Dutch radio sessions collection, Unravelled, prior to the release of the band's final studio album, The Glamour, in 1995. The Glamour was the first studio album to feature new members Simon Anderson and Terry Todd (who appeared on Unravelled), after the departure of Bacon. The latter had left to concentrate on production work at the band's Axis studio in Sheffield. No singles were released from The Glamour, and several songs from these sessions (e.g., "Hyperprism" and "Evanescent") were only included on the 2007 reissue of the album.

The Comsat Angels disbanded in late 1995 following UK dates to promote The Glamour.

== Other projects ==
Fellows released an instrumental album, Mood X, his first solo release, on RPM in 1997. He also began managing the band Gomez that year after discovering them. He later helped the band Little Glitches, and was said to be working on a more traditional song-based solo album. In July 2008, he posted five songs recorded in the mid-1990s on his Myspace page. In January 2020 he released the album Slow Glass. The rest of the Comsat Angels regrouped in the late 1990s under the new moniker Soup, with new vocalist Peter Hope, but soon disbanded. Their sole album, Condensed, was recorded with producer John Wills of Loop in 1998, but not released until 2012. Peake later formed the duo Lost Garden.

== Brief reformation ==
The Comsat Angels reformed for a gig on 26 April 2009 as part of the Sensoria music festival at the Sheffield O2 Academy. They played tracks from their first three albums, including what many consider to be their masterpiece, Sleep No More. Mark Kermode introduced the band on stage, describing them not only as his personal favourite act of all time but as "the greatest band in the world". The band completed a UK tour of three cities (Glasgow, Manchester and London) during October 2009, followed by a special hometown show at Plug in Sheffield on 11 December 2010.

== Legacy ==
The Comsat Angels' albums remained out of print for years, but RPM Records rereleased the first three Polydor albums on CD in 1995, while another British label, Renascent, reissued several of them in 2006 and 2007, adding outtakes and other tracks. Martin Gore of Depeche Mode covered "Gone" on his 1989 EP, Counterfeit. In 1992, Silkworm covered "Our Secret" as the B-side of their "The Chain" 7" single. Joel RL Phelps, formerly of Silkworm, covered "Lost Continent" on his 1999 album Blackbird.

Jack Rabid, the publisher of The Big Takeover magazine, has been one of the band's biggest supporters since the early 1980s.

Mark Kermode, a film critic for BBC Radio 5 Live and The Observer, championed the Comsat Angels when reviewing the Ian Curtis biopic Control, stating that the Comsats were "the band that Joy Division should have been". In May 2008, Kermode interviewed British poet Simon Armitage on BBC Two's The Culture Show and the two discussed their love of the band. In his Film Review show on 2 May 2014, Kermode related that Fellows had sent him the remains of the guitar he used in the band's first three albums, as he felt Kermode was one of the few people likely to appreciate it. Kermode had the guitar rebuilt into working order.

== Members ==
- Stephen Fellows – vocals, guitar (1978–1995, 2009–2010)
- Mik Glaisher – drums (1978–1995, 2009–2010)
- Kevin Bacon – bass (1978–1992, 2009–2010)
- Andy Peake – keyboards (1978–1995, 2009–2010)
- Nick Robinson – guitar (1990)
- Simon Anderson – guitar (1993–1995)
- Terry Todd – bass (1993–1995, 2009)

== Discography ==
=== Studio albums ===
- Waiting for a Miracle (1980, Polydor) (reissued in 1995 on RPM, in 2006 on Renascent and in 2015 on Edsel)
- Sleep No More (1981, Polydor) NZ No. 44, UK No. 51 (reissued in 1995 on RPM, in 2006 on Renascent and in 2015 on Edsel)
- Fiction (1982, Polydor) UK No. 94 (reissued in 1995 on RPM, in 2006 on Renascent and in 2015 on Edsel)
- Land (1983, Jive) (reissued on Connoisseur in 2001) UK No. 91
- 7 Day Weekend (1985, Jive) (reissued on Connoisseur in 2001)
- Chasing Shadows (1986, Island) (reissued on Edsel in 2015)
- Fire on the Moon (as Dream Command) (1990, Island) (U.S. and Netherlands only) (reissued on Edsel in 2015)
- My Mind's Eye (1992/1993, RPM/Caroline [U.S.]) (U.S. version has bonus tracks "There Is No Enemy" and "Magonia") (reissued on Thunderbird in 2001 and in 2007 on Renascent)
- The Glamour (1995, RPM) (reissued in 2007 on Renascent)

=== Singles and EPs ===
- "Red Planet" 7" (March 1979, Junta JUNTA1) (black and limited red vinyl versions)
- "Total War" 7" (May 1980, Polydor 2059 227)
- "Independence Day" 7" (11 July 1980, Polydor 2059 257)
- "Eye of the Lens" 7"/double 7"/12" (March 1981, Polydor POSP 242)
- "(Do The) Empty House" 7"/double 7" (October 1981, Polydor POSP 359)
- "It's History" 7" (May 1982, Polydor POSP 432)
- "After the Rain (Remix)" 7" (September 1982, Polydor POSP 513)
- "Will You Stay Tonight?" 7"/12"/12" picture disc (August 1983, Jive JIVE 46) UK No. 81
- "Island Heart" 7"/ 12" (October 1983, Jive JIVE 51 ) UK No. 139
- "Independence Day" (re-recording) double 7"/12" (January 1984, Jive JIVE 54) UK No. 71
- "You Move Me" 7"/12" (May 1984, Jive JIVE 65) UK No. 101
- "Day One" 7"/12" (September 1984, Jive JIVE 73) UK No. 119
- "I'm Falling" 7"/12" (September 1985, Jive JIVE 87) UK No. 90
- "Forever Young" 7"/12" (November 1985, Jive JIVE 111)
- "The Cutting Edge" 7"/12" (February 1987, Island IS 312) UK No. 175
- "Celestine" (as Dream Command) CD single (1990, Island) (U.S. only)
- "Driving" 12"/CD EP (1992, RPM/ Thunderbird CSA001)
- "Shiva Descending" CD EP (1993, Crisis/ Normal NORMAL 149) (Netherlands only)
- "Field of Tall Flowers" 12"/CD EP (1994, RPM/ Thunderbird CSA 003)
- "The Cutting Edge" (version from Unravelled) CD EP (1994, Crisis 599 990–2)

=== Compilations and live albums ===
- Enz (1982, Polydor) (Netherlands only)
- Time Considered as a Helix of Semi-Precious Stones – The BBC Sessions 1979–1984 (1992, RPM) (reissued in 2006 by Renascent)
- Unravelled (1994, RPM) (Dutch radio sessions)
- From Beyond 2 (2000, Cherry Red)
- To Before (2007, Renascent)
