= Fire on the Moon (Dream Command album) =

Studio album by Dream Command
- Released: 1990
- Genre: Post-punk
- Length: 40:38
- Label: Island
- Producer: Kevin Bacon

Dream Command chronology
Chasing Shadows (1986)	Fire on the Moon (1990)	My Mind's Eye (1992)

Professional ratings
Review scores
Source	Rating
Allmusic	1.5/5 stars

Fire on the Moon is the Comsat Angels' seventh album, released in 1990 on Island Records. It was issued under the alias Dream Command, and in limited quantities in the United States and the Netherlands only. A promo-only single of "Celestine" was released in similarly small quantities.

Frontman Stephen Fellows was once asked which of the Comsats' albums was his least favorite. He replied, "Least favourite is not a Comsats album, but a Dream Command one [Fire On The Moon] – what the hell were we thinking about?"

Fire on the Moon was reissued by Edsel Records in November 2015 as part of a two-CD set which also included the 1986 album Chasing Shadows, which was recorded under the band's original name.

== Track listing ==
All tracks written by Fellows/Glaisher/Bacon/Peake.

1. "Celestine" – 3:49
2. "Whirlwind" – 3:35
3. "Sleepwalking" – 5:13
4. "Reach For Me" – 5:01
5. "Ice Sculpture" – 4:44
6. "Venus Hunter" – 4:37
7. "Phantom Power" – 3:45
8. "Transport of Delight" – 3:25
9. "She's Invisible" – 4:05
10. "Mercury" – 2:24

== Personnel ==
- Stephen Fellows - vocals, guitar
- Andy Peake - synthesizer, vocals
- Kevin Bacon - bass guitar
- Mik Glaisher - drums
- Deborah Goddard - backing vocals on "Whirlwind" and "Reach For Me"
