= The Imaginary Library =

1982 book by Alvin Kernan

The Imaginary Library: An Essay on Literature and Society
- Cover of the American first edition
- Author: Alvin Kernan
- Language: English
- Subject: Literary criticism
- Publisher: Princeton University Press
- Publication date: 1982
- Publication place: United States
- Media type: Print
- Pages: 196
- ISBN: 978-0691614564

The Imaginary Library: An Essay on Literature and Society is a 1982 book by American literary critic and professor Alvin Kernan. In the book, Kernan considers literature as a social institution and considers ways in which the reigning Romantic conception of literature, which has dominated Western culture for 200 years, has fallen into decline due to changes in society.

== Overview ==
Kernan discusses literature as an institution of society, one made up not only of writers but also of publishers, booksellers, critics, teachers, reviewers, and readers. He maintains that, despite the appearance of fixity that literature has sometimes had, it is an institution that fluctuates and changes under historical forces. He uses as examples the role of the poet in Renaissance society, as described in Castiglioni's The Courtier, in which the poet was an expressly amateur occupation that helped the writer gain favor in service to a prince. Kernan counterposes that writerly role with the visit that King George III paid to Samuel Johnson, in which the King deferred to Johnson's knowledge of literature, books, and the academy, an encounter that Kernan argues represented a new independence for the writer, a conception that is central to the Romantic conception of the writer's role.

Kernan discusses four representative novels—Saul Bellow's Humboldt's Gift, Bernard Malamud's The Tenants, Vladimir Nabokov's Pale Fire, and Norman Mailer's Of a Fire on the Moon—and maintains that each of these novels provides a "localized case-study of the way in which literature and society are interacting at the present and the institution is responding to some very basic challenges." Each of the novels features a protagonist who is a writer attempting to write a traditional poem or novel, and due to the realities they face from the world, their efforts are frustrated. Kernan's discussions of each of these novels are meant to illustrate how he contends the institution of literature is changing under pressure from society.

Writing in Journal of American Studies, David Clough described Kernan's argument as follows:

Kernan "identifies a further change with the post-war emphasis on 'the failure of the central "realities"' of romantic literature, and he chooses four texts to explore aspects of this. In Bellow's Humboldt's Gift he sees the powers of the poet under question; in Malamud's The Tenants it is the validity of the literary text that is in doubt; in Nabokov's Pale Fire the ability of literature to affect readers and the world is questioned; whilst Mailer's Of a Fire on the Moon doubts the believability of the poetic as opposed to the scientific view of the world. In all four texts Kernan sees the old order passing, with protagonists trying to write in the old Romantic way "in the face of a world which their powers can no longer master and transform"

Kernan's discussion of the changes in the social institution of literature is informed by the sociological theories of Peter L. Berger, who is cited several times in the book. Other writers and thinkers who figure prominently in his account include Northrop Frye, Matthew Arnold, André Malraux, William Wordsworth, and Marshall McLuhan.

== Reception ==
John L. Brown, reviewing the book for World Literature Today, applauded how "Kernan's text—tentative, low-keyed, conciliatory—is mercifully free from the contentiousness of many contemporary critical works of criticism." However, Brown noted that "[a] certain anxiety pervades Kernan's essay as he ventures into an alien terrain, far from the fields he knows best—the drama and the satire of the English Renaissance—and which he has tilled with such profit .... the author seems to be engaged in battering down doors which have stood open or at least well ajar for a very long time."

According to Brown, Kernan's dim view of recent trends in criticism was pragmatic: "He does not wish to condemn out of hand currently voguish techniques such as 'semiotics, reader-response, or grammatology,' but simply questions whether they will be as useful to students and to society as the more traditional view of literature as an imaginative account of "people living out the most intense human experiences."

Jan Cohn, writing in Modern Fiction Studies, described Kernan's book as "broadly conceived and historically complex" Cohn went on to say: "Kernan is cautious about predictions, but he argues that if literature can no longer be understood as the carrier of absolute truth and unchanging values, it can be restructured as a vital kind of system-making, attuned to the later twentieth-century view of man as the constructor of codes and systems, the 'creator of cosmic, social, and linguistic fictions'...."

Laura A. Curtis reviewed the book in Modern Language Studies and concluded, "Kernan's book is a densely packed argument from a fresh, provocative perspective inspired by the sociological theories of Peter Berger."

Robert W. Daniel in The Sewanee Review observed: "At times Kernan is careless, with both his references and his reasoning." Daniel concluded that "The Imaginary Library, lively and readable as it is, may at least convince its readers that a widespread concern over the future of literature exists, but the choice of Bellow, Malamud, Nabokov, and Mailer hardly supports the conclusion that the days of literature are numbered. All four are serious writers fully deserving of the fame they enjoy in the world outside the universities."

Judie Newman, writing in The Yearbook of English Studies, found in Kernan's book "an attractive emphasis on the major question of metamorphosis in the literary canon, and patches of perceptive local criticism generate fresh insights into the four novels. The study lacks, however, the polemical thrust of the essay, reserving until its close Professor Kernan's main point: his regret that the literary text is now being used solely as a basis for a science of interpretation, and that semiotics, reader response, and grammatology have displaced humanist works on the bookshelves."

== See also ==
- The Death of Literature

== Sources ==
- Brown, John L. (Spring 1983). "Review of The Imaginary Library: An Essay on Literature and Society by Alvin B. Kernan". World Literature Today. 57 (2: Transcending Parochial National Literatures): 356. doi:10.2307/40138139. JSTOR 40138139.
- Clough, David (April 1983). "Review of The Imaginary Library: An Essay on Literature and Society by Alvin B. Kernan, Books Speaking to Books: A Contextual Approach to American Fiction by William T. Stafford". Journal of American Studies. 17 (1): 136–137. doi:10.1017/S0021875800014791. JSTOR 27554284.
- Cohn, Jan (Winter 1982). "Review of The Imaginary Library: An Essay on Literature and Society by Alvin B. Kernan, Patterns of Nationality: Twentieth-Century Literary Versions of America by Benjamin T. Spencer, and The Yellow Peril: Chinese Americans in American Fiction, 1850-1940 by William F. Wu". Modern Fiction Studies. 28 (4): 658–660. JSTOR 26280993.
- Curtis, Laura (Spring 1986). "Review of The Imaginary Library: An Essay on Literature and Society by Alvin B. Kernan". Modern Language Studies. 16 (2): 78–90. doi:10.2307/3195075. JSTOR 3195075.
- Daniel, Robert W. (Spring 1983). "Review of The Imaginary Library: An Essay on Literature and Society by Alvin B. Kernan". The Sewanee Review. 91 (2): xxxviii. JSTOR 27544116.
- Helgerson, Richard (Summer 1983). "Review of The Imaginary Library: An Essay on Literature and Society by Alvin B. Kernan". Comparative Literature. 35 (3): 289–291. doi:10.2307/1770628. JSTOR 1770628.
- Kernan, Alvin (1982). The Imaginary Library: An Essay on Literature and Society. Princeton University Press. ISBN 978-0691614564.
- Newman, Judie (1985). "Review of The Imaginary Library: An Essay on Literature and Society by Alvin B. Kernan". The Yearbook of English Studies. 15 (Anglo-French Literary Relations (Special Number)): 263–264. doi:10.2307/3508566. JSTOR 3508566.
- Vanderbilt, Kermit (December 1982). "Review of The Imaginary Library: An Essay on Literature and Society by Alvin B. Kernan". American Literature. 54 (4): 626–627. doi:10.2307/2926027. JSTOR 2926027.
