= Of a Fire on the Moon =

Apollo 11 moon landing account by Norman Mailer

- First edition
- Author: Norman Mailer
- Language: English
- Genre: New Journalism
- Publisher: Little, Brown and Company
- Publication date: 1970
- Publication place: United States
- Media type: Print (hardcover & paperback)
- Pages: 472 pages
- ISBN: 978-0297179528
- OCLC: 101602

Of a Fire on the Moon (also published as A Fire on the Moon, and later as Moonfire) is a work of nonfiction by Norman Mailer which was serialised in Life magazine in 1969 and 1970, and published in 1970 as a book. It is a documentary and a personal reflection on the Apollo 11 Moon landing.

== Writing and publication ==
A Fire on the Moon first appeared in August 1969

Mailer's research work included spending a week in July 1969 at the Manned Spacecraft Center in Houston, then ten days at Cape Kennedy in Florida, including witnessing the launch of the Saturn V rocket. He returned to Houston after the launch to follow the rest of the mission from there.

He returned to his home in Provincetown, Massachusetts on July 23, the day before the astronauts arrived back to Earth, and began writing about the historic voyage during marathon writing sessions to meet his pressing deadlines for Life magazine. He wrote that he was "in a panic to get back and start work – his first deadline was not three weeks off."

His account, which ran to 115,000 words, was published between August 1969 and January 1970 in three long installments—A Fire on the Moon, The Psychology of Astronauts, and A Dream of the Future's Face.

In a foreword to Mailer's first installment, Life Managing Editor Ralph Graves introduced "some 26,000 words—the longest non-fiction piece Life has ever published in one issue."

On February 26, 1970, after the magazine series had concluded, Mailer wrote to Apollo 11 commander, Neil Armstrong, "I've worked as assiduously as any writer I know to portray the space program in its largest, not its smallest, dimension".

Following the magazine publication, Mailer finished his expanded account in book form in mid-April 1970 while the stricken Apollo 13 mission was returning to Earth. This book was published in the United States under the title Of a Fire on the Moon. In the United Kingdom, it was published with its original magazine article title, A Fire on the Moon.

== Critical reception ==
Initial reviews of the book were mixed. Morris Dickstein in The New York Times Book Review suggested the book was overwritten, but still had merit: "This is not perhaps the book on the impact of technology that we needed, but it is important nonetheless, and offers much to ponder and prey on". Kirkus Reviews called it "a factitious book . . ., [an] epic self-parody as he embroiders commonplace formulations of the significance of Apollo 11". More recent considerations of it have varied. Alvin Kernan, in his 1982 academic study The Imaginary Library, included a chapter on Of a Fire on the Moon, noting it represented the declining relevance of the Romantic conception of literature. In The Guardian in 2014, Geoff Dyer called it "a stunning achievement" of the New Journalism.

== Coffee table edition ==
The 40th anniversary of the first Moon landing was marked in 2009 by the release of an abridged, limited edition of the text, re-packaged with images from NASA and Life magazine. This production retitled the work, MoonFire, and was presented in an aluminium box with a lid shaped like the crater-pocked surface of the Moon; the object was mounted on four legs resembling the Apollo Lunar Module's struts. Thus, the coffee table book came inside its own lunar-themed "coffee table", with an uneven surface (see photograph). The package included a numbered print of the famous portrait of Buzz Aldrin standing on the Moon, framed in plexiglass and signed by the astronaut himself—and enclosed a lunar meteorite. Only 12 were created and the price was $112,500.

Norman Mailer died two years before the package was launched. A conventional hardback edition of the same volume was released in 2015.

== Painting on first edition cover ==
The painting on the cover of the first edition (Little, Brown & Co, 1970) is Le Monde Invisible, a 1954 oil painting by René Magritte. Mailer describes seeing this painting in Chapter 5 ("A Dream of the Future's Face") of the first part ("Aquarius"). "In the foyer was a painting by Magritte, a startling image of a room with an immense rock situated in the center of the floor." The 1970 dust jacket says the painting is in a private collection.

== Editions and title variations ==
Buzz Aldrin on the Moon

1. Life serializations:
  Part I: "A Fire on the Moon" — Life magazine, 29 August 1969.
  Part II: "The Psychology of Astronauts" — Life magazine, 14 November 1969.
  Part III: "A Dream of the Future's Face" — Life magazine, 9 January 1970.
2. Of a Fire on the Moon — Little, Brown & Co, Boston, 1970, ISBN 0-316-54411-6.
3. A Fire on the Moon — Weidenfeld & Nicolson, London, 1970, ISBN 0-297-17952-7.
4. MoonFire: The Epic Journey of Apollo 11 — Taschen GmbH, Köln, 2009, ISBN 3-8365-1179-7, ISBN 3-8365-2077-X.
5. A Fire on the Moon — Penguin Classics, London, 2014, ISBN 978-0-141-39496-1.

== Resources ==
- Gallery of Mailer's research materials, hand written notes, and manuscripts for this book. Norman Mailer archive at the University of Texas.
