= Cactus World News =

Irish rock band

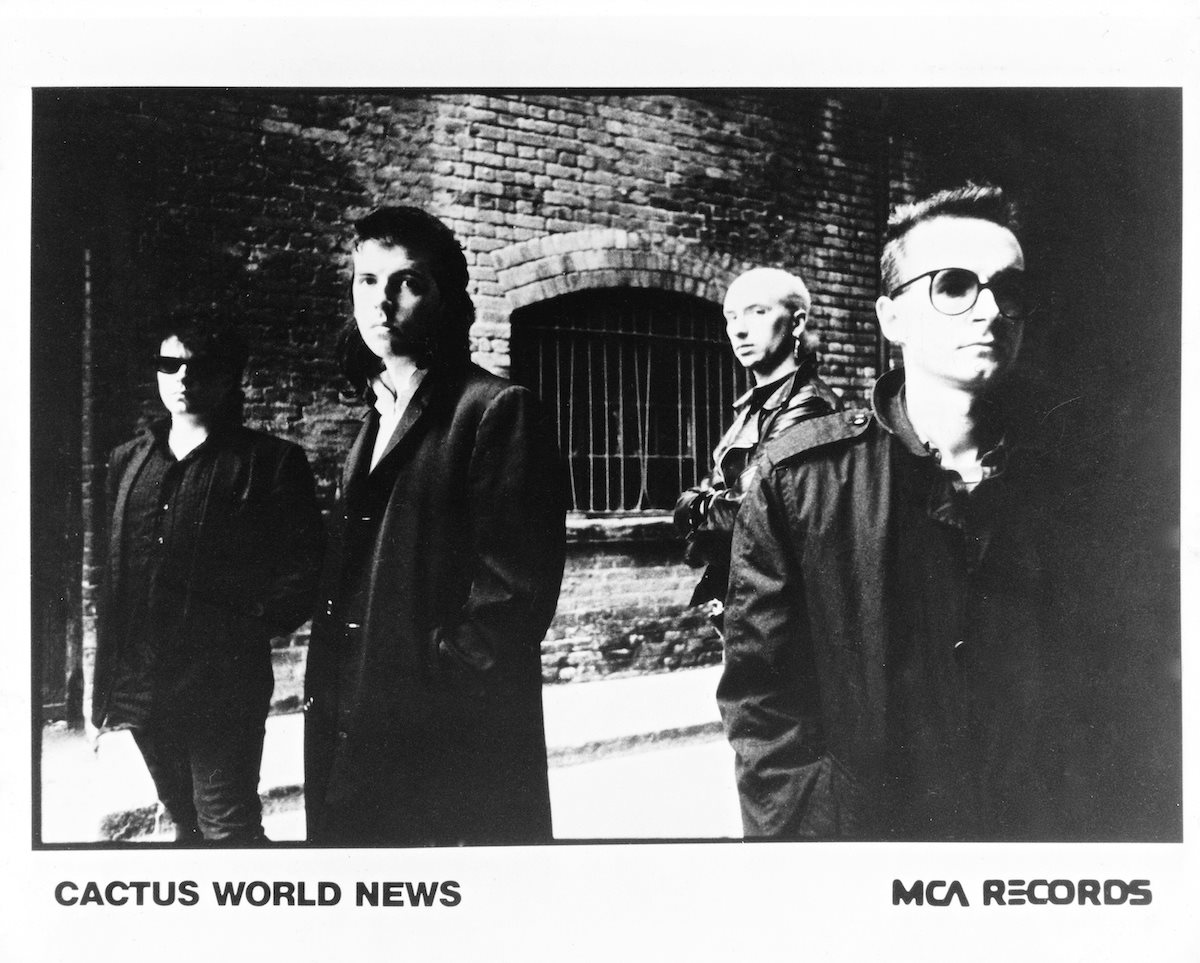
- Cactus World News MCA records Publicity photo

Background information
- Origin: Dublin, Ireland
- Genres: Rock, new wave
- Years active: 1984–1991, 2011–present
- Labels: MCA
- Past members: Frank Kearns; Feargal MacAndris; Wayne Sheehy; Eoin McEvoy
- Website: CWN website

Cactus World News is an Irish rock band formed in Dublin in April 1984. Founded by Frank Kearns (guitar) and Eoin McEvoy (vocals), the first full stable lineup also included Wayne Sheehy (drums) and Fergal MacAndris (bass). They reformed in 2011 with a new lineup of Kearns, Sheehy and MacAndris, including Eoin Scott and Eoin Watkins. Their early influences were the Clash, Ramones, Talking Heads, U2, the Waterboys and R.E.M.

== Career ==
Their first release, and best-known song was "The Bridge", which was produced by U2's Bono, and released on their Mother Records label. They toured the UK with The Cult in 1985 and signed with MCA Records. They performed at the Self Aid concert in Dublin on 17 May 1986. The band released their debut album, Urban Beaches, in 1986 and gained notable hits with its three singles: "Years Later", "Worlds Apart" and a re-recording of "The Bridge". It has a five-star rating on iTunes USA. AllMusic gave Urban Beaches a rating of 4.5 out of 5. All three singles reached the UK Singles Chart.

After their second album, No Shelter, was shelved in 1989, the band were released from their recording contract and underwent several personnel changes. MacAindris and Sheehy both quit in 1989. McEvoy and Kearns continued for a few more years, with various other band members coming and going, including Chris McGoldrick (bass), John Doyle (bass) and JJ Collier (drums).

In 2010, Kearns played guitar on three songs on the Australian band The Church's album Untitled #23 ("Dead Mans Hand", "On Angel Street", and "Operetta"). Praised for its moody yet strong songwriting, it has yielded some of the Church's best reviews of their career, including a 5 star review from Australia's Rolling Stone. Kearns also contributed guitar to "Love Philtre" on the Church's 2014 album Further/Deeper.

== Discography ==
=== Albums ===
Studio albums

| Year | Album | Chart positions | |
| Year | Album | UK | US |
|---|---|---|---|
| 1986 | Urban Beaches | 56 | 180 |
| 2004 | No Shelter | - | - |

Live album

- 1986 – Live: Spin Magazine Concert Series

Compilation album

- 2015 – Found

=== Singles ===
| Year | Title | Chart positions |
| Year | Title | UK |
|---|---|---|
| 1985 | "The Bridge" | - |
| 1986 | "Years Later" | 59 |
| 1986 | "Worlds Apart" | 58 |
| 1986 | "The Bridge" | 74 |
| 1989 | "Rebound" | - |
| 1989 | "Town Like This" | 144 |
| 1990 | "Don't Let Me Down" | - |
