= The Death of Literature =

1990 book by Alvin Kernan

- Cover of the American first edition
- Author: Alvin Kernan
- Language: English
- Subject: Literary criticism
- Publisher: Yale University Press
- Publication date: 1990
- Publication place: United States
- Media type: Print
- Pages: 230
- ISBN: 978-0300047837

The Death of Literature is a 1990 book by American literary critic and professor Alvin Kernan. In the book, Kernan considers the circumstances and causes of what be describes as the death of the "old literature" of romanticism and modernism. Among the causes he considers are recent theoretical approaches such as deconstruction, the politicization of criticism, and the rise of television culture.

== Reception ==
Richard A. Lanham, reviewing The Death of Literature in College English, noted Kernan's "splenetic despair" and found Kernan's critique of digital technologies to be misguided. "Kernan is deaf and blind throughout to how powerfully the electronic word feeds back on Western literary history," Lanham wrote. "The movement from printed book to electronic screen is making us see, for a start, the distortions we practice on poems like the Iliad, or plays like Hamlet, by fixing them in print and in the print ethos."

Lanham did, however, find strengths in Kernan's book: "Kernan also has many sensible things to say about the bureaucratization of learning, and especially of literary study. He sees clearly that literary study will undergo the same re-direction of energy and etiolation of purpose that all human activity undergoes when deeply bureaucratized. It will feel especially the embarrassing contrast between its permanently adversative stand toward constituted authority and its own increasingly bureaucratic personality and language."

Laurence Lerner, writing in Comparative Literature, found Kernan's book to be of a piece with other books written by "the eminent scholar on retirement, who places a crown upon a lifetime's effort by publishing a book on the state of literary studies today, less carefully documented than the learned works which earned his reputation, and often polemical in intent, and which, with luck, may end up on the best-seller lists. Alvin Kernan's book fits this pattern, and whether or not it becomes a best-seller, it will take its place among the best informed and best written of such works."

Peter Erickson, writing in Criticism delivered a harsh assessment of Kernan's book, finding it written at times in "catchy, superficial style of tabloid reportage." Erickson also found Kernan's view of the death of literature to be due to Kernan's neglect of minority literatures: "Contrary to Kernan's position, literature is very much alive. But its life has shifted in large measure to emergent minority literatures....Kernan can neglect major new literary developments only by seeing them as noncanonical, inferior, and incidental. This perception is implied by the ominous, condensed allusion to 'less prestigious writings' in the counterpointing of 'traditional intellectual qualities represented by the classics of literature versus social values of equality of gender and race represented by less prestigious writings.'"

J. Robert Barth wrote in CrossCurrents: "This is a strange and aggravating book." Barth went on to question the truth of Kernan's dismal assessment university literature departments. "Kernan's major argument is that a broad-based revolution, whose driving energy was 'classically Marxist,' overthrew 'the old literature with its quaint beliefs in creative geniuses, iconic works of art, myths, and eternal meanings'.... But Kernan seems to recognize no middle ground between complete capitulation to the 'revolution'—which I suggest only a very few departments have accepted—and a more responsible evaluation of the insights of new critical theory. I do not recognize the barren landscape Kernan paints as the one I have inhabited for the past thirty years."

Sanford Pinsker, reviewing the book in The Georgia Review, stated that "one comes to an attention-grabbing title like The Death of Literature with a certain amount of skepticism." Pinsker added: "[T]he salient point of Kernan's thesis is that the death of the old literature must be understood 'not as a culpable act but as part of a broad cultural change.'" Pinsker concluded: "There are good reasons to regard Kernan's witty, provocative, altogether fascinating report about the death of literature as greatly exaggerated."

D. B. Jones in Modern Language Studies found The Death of Literature to be a "brave and solid book," and stated that Kernan "supplies better arguments than many of literature's detractors for the relativism of its authority."

John Ramage reviewed the book in the Rocky Mountain Review of Language and Literature, and conclude that "[m]uch of the considerable pleasure to be gained from reading The Death of Literature derives from the vigor of Kernan's prose, which in turn follows largely from the decisiveness of Kernan's moral judgments. He is less concerned to trace his way through the labyrinthine arguments of contemporary critics than he is to judge the social consequences of their ideologies."

Frank McConnell in The Wilson Quarterly found that Kernan's book compared favorably to two other best-selling books by humanities professors both published a few years before The Death of Literature, Allan Bloom's The Closing of the American Mind (1987) and E. D. Hirsch's Cultural Literacy: What Every American Needs to Know (1987). "Kernan is more original than Bloom or Hirsch. He blames the fall of culture on the poets and critics who should be its guardians. If we are collapsing into a new barbarism, Kernan says it is in no small measure due to the asocial artist whose every utterance, however outrageous, can be justified just because he calls himself that, an artist. And the part of the literary tradition that the "artist" leaves unharmed, the critic finishes off."

Robert Hauptman, reviewing The Death of Literature in World Literature Today, concluded that "The Death of Literature is a useful, often insightful commentary on current thought on criticism, literature, and society. It will stimulate the intellect of anyone who has the self-discipline to turn off the television or computer."

== See also ==
- The Imaginary Library

== Sources ==
- Barth, J. Robert (Spring 1991). "Literature—Dead or Alive (review of The Death of Literature by Alvin Kernan )". CrossCurrents. 41 (4: Gary MacEoin Enrique Dussel): 558–559. JSTOR 24460362.
- Erickson, Peter (Spring 1991). "Review of The Death of Literature". Criticism. 33 (2): 263–265. JSTOR 23113540.
- Hauptman, Robert (Spring 1991). "Review of The Death of Literature by Alvin Kernan". World Literature Today. 65 (2: Literature and Revolution in Eastern Europe): 373–374. doi:10.2307/40147329. JSTOR 40147329.
- Jones, D. B. (Summer 1991). "Review of The Death of Literature by Alvin Kernan". Modern Language Studies. 21 (3): 107–109. doi:10.2307/3195092. JSTOR 3195092.
- Lanham, Richard A. (February 1992). "From Book to Screen: Four Recent Studies (review of Writing Space: The Computer, Hypertext, and the History of Writing by Jay David Bolter; Disappearing through the Skylight: Culture and Technology in the Twentieth Century by O. B. Hardison; The Death of Literature by Alvin Kernan; Teletheory: Grammatology in the Age of Video by Gregory Ulmer)". College English. 54 (2): 199–206. doi:10.2307/377585. JSTOR 377585.
- Lerner, Laurence (Spring 1991). "Review of The Death of Literature by Alvin Kernan". Comparative Literature. 43 (2): 171–173. doi:10.2307/1770802. JSTOR 1770802.
- McConnell, Frank (Winter 1991). "Literature and Its Discontents (review of The Death of Literature by Alvin Kernan)". The Wilson Quarterly. 15 (1): 89–91. JSTOR 40233159.
- Pinsker, Sanford (Spring 1991). "Review of The Death of Literature by Alvin Kernan". The Georgia Review. 45 (1: Writers on Writing): 186–191. JSTOR 41400154.
- Ramage, John (1992). "Review of The Death of Literature by Alvin Kernan". Rocky Mountain Review of Language and Literature. 46 (1/2): 91–93. doi:10.2307/1347641. JSTOR 1347641.
