= Engine Alley =

Irish rock music group

- Origin: Kilkenny/Dublin, Ireland
- Genres: Rock, indie rock, psychedelic pop, power pop, glam rock, art rock
- Years active: 1989–present
- Labels: Mother Records, Island Records, Polydor Ltd.
- Members: Eamonn Byrne; Brian Kenealy; Canice Kenealy; Paul O'Byrne
- Past members: Emmaline Duffy-Fallon; Kenneth Rice; Jerry Fehily; Gary Sullivan; Mark Murphy

Engine Alley are a rock band from Kilkenny, Ireland, active since the 1990s. Their biggest success came in the early 90s, with many television appearances and successful singles. They have toured the UK, United States and Europe and continue to play live shows every year.

== History ==
=== Formation and early career ===
The band was formed in 1989 in Dublin by brothers Canice (vocals/guitar) and Brian Kenealy (guitar), along with childhood friend Eamonn Byrne (bass). Having grown up in Kilkenny, the band would relocate to Dublin in the 1980s; with Brian having moved there as early as 1983. This core line-up would continue to the present day, making up the band's chief songwriting team. The band took their name from a laneway in The Liberties, an old part of Dublin's south inner-city. Having moved to Dublin, the band met drummer Emmaline Duffy-Fallon, who joined the band while still in school. The band made a demo, which was followed quickly by an appearance on national television. This led to the band doing a session with Dave Fanning.

A key figure in the early development of the band, Pete Holidai (of The Radiators from Space) discovered the band around this time, having heard the band's Fanning Session and subsequently attending one of their shows. With growing interest from record labels, Holidai helped the band cut more demos and he would later become their manager. Following on from these demos the band signed a record contract with U2's Mother Records later that year. In 1991 the band added classically trained violin player Kenneth Rice from County Kerry, who also doubled up as keyboard player. The band had quickly built up a following; largely due to their colourful and energetic live performances, in tandem with their 70s glam-inspired image. With the band making numerous appearances on prominent chat and music television programmes in Ireland, October 1992 saw the release of their full-length debut album A Sonic Holiday, produced by Steve Lillywhite (U2, Peter Gabriel, The Rolling Stones). The record would win the Best Irish Album accolade that year, awarded by Ireland's leading music magazine Hot Press. The album featured many successful singles, notable of which is Song For Someone which featured Lillywhite's then-wife Kirsty MacColl on backing vocals.

The changing musical climate of the early 90s caused problems for the band commercially – frustrated that the band had failed to mirror their domestic success overseas, it was deemed necessary by record label that the album be re-jigged and re-branded for a UK release. In 1993 the band returned to the studio with ex-Vibrators man Pat Collier (Robyn Hitchcock, The House of Love, New Model Army) acting as producer/engineer. The album was released by Polydor Records in November of that year under the title Engine Alley, the bulk of which was made up of material featured on A Sonic Holiday. This version of the album would later be released with an alternative cover in the US by Island Records. The band would, for a brief period, relocate to London (where they lived together under the same roof) before embarking on a short but successful tour of the US. Upon returning to Ireland drummer Emmaline Duffy-Fallon departed the band, being replaced by ex-Hothouse Flowers drummer Jerry Fehily. February 1995 saw the band part ways with Mother Records, following which they entered Sun Studios, Dublin to record the follow-up to their debut album – the result of which was Shot in the Light. Released 28 July 1995 on Independent Records, it was somewhat of a departure from the songs of the debut album; being more raw and displaying a darker edge. The album was a critical success but failed to match the hype and radio exposure of previous releases.

The band went on hiatus for a short time in 1996 and have not since returned to their prior level of activity, though they have continued to record and perform music as Engine Alley and otherwise. In 1997 the band line-up was bolstered by the additions of Paul O'Byrne, who replaced Gary Sullivan on drums, and Mark Murphy (guitar) of The Valleys, which had been Brian and Eamonn's interim project. Though Murphy parted ways with the band soon after, O'Byrne continues to play drums for Engine Alley at live performances. In 1999, the band released the five-song Lavender Girl EP. The band has recorded at least an album's worth of material, which has as-yet not seen an official release.

=== Later history and outside projects ===
Brian has released two solo albums; Paradise Place (2004) and Hiems Transiit (2013), and currently teaches music as a profession. In 2015 he teamed up with bassist Paul Byrne to release the album Farrago under the name Kenealy & Byrne; an eclectic mix ranging in style from country to 60s psychedelia, the foundation of which lay in bass parts that Paul had written which were then developed into full songs. Canice released a solo album under the name Clay Machine in 2002, and has also played in The Sound We Make (featuring members of Pugwash and The Duckworth Lewis Method). He currently plays in Rigmarole, who have a more unconventional approach and experimental sound with a strong emphasis on performance; using stream of consciousness delivery and spoken word coupled with the use of guitar and vocal effects. Released in March 2017 was the album State of Mind by Canice's latest band Sonic Bubonic. Eamonn has continued to play in various bands and was live bassist for Michael Flatley's Lord of the Dance tour. Emmaline released one single, Now or Never, in 1995 under the guidance of U2 manager Paul McGuinness, and more recently she founded Preachers Son with Brian Hogan (also of Kíla), whose debut album was produced by Dave Bascombe (Depeche Mode, Goldfrapp, Korn). Ken would become a member of many musical ensembles such as the Irish Chamber Orchestra and the Orchestra of the National Concert Hall, play as a live and session musician for many contemporary acts such as Bell X1, Kirsty MacColl and Idlewild, as well as composing music for film and television.

A Sonic Holiday was included in Tony Clayton Lea's tome 101 Irish Records You Must Hear Before You Die, published by Liberties Press in 2011. In 2013, A Sonic Holiday was featured as one of the 'Top 30 Irish Albums of All Time' in The Irish Independent. Writing for RTÉ, Dan Hegarty said of the band's follow-up Shot in The Light; "If 'A Sonic Holiday' was the sound of that youthful exuberance that debut albums can sometimes harness, 'Shot in the Light' captures the band in their prime. Calling it a master stroke is not false praise." Dan Hegarty would again praise the band's second album in the book Buried Treasure: Overlooked, Forgotten and Uncrowned Classic Albums published by Liberties Press, in 2015.

Engine Alley continue to play gigs every year, most frequently in Dublin and Kilkenny, and released their third album Showroom in September 2018.

== Style and influences ==
Engine Alley fused melodic pop music with hard-edged, catchy riffs. Known for their art rock tendencies, they have incorporated many styles including psychedelic pop, glam rock and punk music. The band have expressed admiration for a variety of artists such as The Beatles, David Bowie, The Clash, Neil Young, Big Star, The Smiths and Talking Heads. They have also noted some progressive rock albums as having been an inspiration, such as Jeff Wayne's Musical Version of The War of the Worlds. Being a keenly visual band they have stated that many films have influenced them, including musicals and the work of Martin Scorsese.

== Discography ==
=== Albums ===
- A Sonic Holiday (Mother Records, October 1992)
- Engine Alley (Polydor Ltd./Mother Records, November 1993)
- Engine Alley [re-issue] (Island Records/Mother Records, October 1994)
- Shot in The Light (Independent Records, 28 July 1995)
- Showroom (14 September 2018)

=== Singles & EPs ===
- "Flowerbox EP" (Mother Records, August 1991)
- "Jesus Christ" (self-released, December 1991)
- "Infamy" (Mother Records, March 1992)
- "Mrs. Winder" (Mother Records, October 1992)
- "Song for Someone" (Mother Records, June 1993)
- "Infamy" [re-issue] (Mother Records/Polydor Ltd., September 1993)
- "Switch EP" (Mother Records, November 1993)
- "Switch" (Mother Records/Polydor Ltd., November 1993)
- "Old Lovers in a Basement Flat" (Mother Records/Polydor Ltd., 1994)
- "I Can't Help You" (Independent Records, December 1995)
- "Lavender Girl EP" (Chrome Star, 7 May 1999)
