= Longpigs =

British alternative rock band

- Longpigs c. 1997; From left to right: Simon Stafford, Crispin Hunt, Richard Hawley, Dee Boyle

Background information
- Origin: Sheffield, England
- Genres: Alternative rock; indie rock; Britpop
- Years active: 1993–2000
- Label: Mother
- Past members: Crispin Hunt; Richard Hawley; Simon Stafford; Dee Boyle; Andy Cook

Longpigs were an English alternative rock band formed in Sheffield in 1993. They comprised Crispin Hunt (vocals, guitar), Richard Hawley (guitar), Simon Stafford (bass guitar) and former Cabaret Voltaire member Dee Boyle (drums), who was replaced by Andy Cook for their second studio album, Mobile Home (1999). The group received success during the Britpop movement with singles such as "She Said" and "On and On", both taken from their well-received debut album, The Sun Is Often Out (1996).

== History ==
=== Early career (1993) ===
The group initially signed with Elektra Records, although just before the release of their first single, Crispin Hunt was injured in a car accident, resulting in his being in a coma for three days. Shortly afterwards, the UK arm of the record label closed. Elektra set a price of £500,000 to release them from their recording contract.

=== The first success (1994–1996) ===
Longpigs' contract with Elektra was purchased by U2's new record label, Mother Records. The band toured extensively, opening for Echobelly, Supergrass and Radiohead in early 1995. Their first singles on Mother Records, "Happy Again", "She Said" and "Jesus Christ", all reached the lower end of the UK Singles Chart. The band played the 1995 Reading Festival. The new track "All Hype" was featured on the compilation CD Volume 14: Reading '95 Special although was never released as a single.

Their fourth single, "Far", hit the UK Top 40. In March 1996 this was followed by the ballad "On and On", which received considerable radio airplay and hit the Top 20 of the UK Singles Chart. In April 1996, the band released their debut album, The Sun Is Often Out, which was declared one of 1996's 50 best albums by both Q and Melody Maker. On the heels of their newfound success, the band repackaged and re-released "She Said", which also reached the UK Top 20 in June 1996, which was followed by "Lost Myself" (No. 22).

=== Attempted popularity in America (1997) ===
Initially things seemed promising in America. In 1997, their single "On and On" was added to the playlist of the influential Los Angeles, California alternative radio station KROQ-FM, briefly reaching the Alternative U.S. Top 10. The song was also featured on the Mission: Impossible soundtrack (although it was not used in the film). They toured America with Echo & the Bunnymen and The Dandy Warhols, and even opened for U2 on several dates of their PopMart world tour. This tour featured a new track, "Beyond Good and Evil", which was never officially released. The band also played the 1997 Glastonbury Festival, with the live track "Travel" (formerly known as "Far" B-side "Amateur Dramatics") being featured on the official BBC live Glastonbury compilation Mud for It. The song "On and On" can be found on the soundtrack to the 1997 film Face starring Robert Carlyle.

=== Decline and split (1999–2000) ===
Before the recording of the band's second album, Mobile Home, Dee Boyle left the band and was replaced by Andy Cook. Boyle's relationship with the band resulted in later conflicts with the members.

Mobile Home was released in October 1999, along with the two singles "Blue Skies" and "The Frank Sonata". After briefly reaching the Top 40 in the UK Albums Chart, sales of the album faded away. Mother Records folded in 2000, and the rest of the band split up shortly afterwards.

== Aftermath and other projects ==
Following the break-up of the band, guitarist Richard Hawley toured with Pulp, before embarking upon a successful solo career and also working with Jarvis Cocker in the electro group Relaxed Muscle. Hawley's fourth and seventh solo albums, Coles Corner and Standing at the Sky's Edge, were nominated for the Mercury Prize, although each lost out, to fellow Sheffield band Arctic Monkeys and art rock band Alt-J respectively.

Simon Stafford has also played as part of Cocker's backing band on his solo endeavours. He played in Hawley's band for a year and went on to join Joe Strummer's band The Mescaleros, playing with them until Strummer's death in 2002. He then played with Jarvis Cocker and various other bands, playing various instruments. He now plays keyboards and trombone with Liverpool-based heavy-psych rockers The Bonnacons of Doom on Rocket Records.

In 2004, Hunt lent his voice to the self-titled album by electronic band Mayonnaise, which also featured Howie B, on the Lunaticworks/BMG label. The following year Hunt joined a band called Gramercy, with Nigel Hoyle (ex–Gay Dad) and Dylan Rippon. In August 2005 the band recorded a single entitled "Hold On" (Redemption Records), which had begun to pick up airplay on BBC Radio 2 when the band split before releasing any material.

Hunt has also worked as a songwriter and record producer for Ellie Goulding, Penguin Prison, Midnight Lion, Florence and the Machine, Newton Faulkner, Kiko Bun, Natalie Imbruglia, Gabriella Cilmi, Lisa Mitchell, Lissie, Richard Walters, Josephine Oniyama, Clare Maguire, Liam Frost, Ron Sexsmith, Kate Walsh, Jake Bugg, Misty Miller, Eliza and the Bear and JP Cooper.

In 2013, a compilation album On and On: The Anthology was released, featuring material from the Longpigs' two studio albums, singles' B-sides and previously unreleased material.

In April 2017, it was reported that Dee Boyle, the band's former drummer, had died. He was 52 years old. The cause of death was unknown.

In April 2019, Hunt was announced as an MEP candidate for the newly formed Change UK - The Independent Group (TIG) political party for the 2019 European Parliament election. He was not elected.

== Discography ==
=== Albums ===
- The Sun Is Often Out (1996) UK No. 26
- Mobile Home (1999) UK No. 33

==== Compilations ====
- On and On: The Anthology (2013)

=== Singles ===
Year	Title	Peak chart positions		Album
Year	Title	UK	US Alt	Album
1995	"She Said"	67	–	The Sun is Often Out
1995	"Jesus Christ"	67	–	The Sun is Often Out
1996	"Far"	37	–	The Sun is Often Out
1996	"On and On"	16	17	The Sun is Often Out
1996	"She Said" (re-issue)	16	–	The Sun is Often Out
1996	"Lost Myself"	22	–	The Sun is Often Out
1999	"Blue Skies"	21	–	Mobile Home
1999	"The Frank Sonata"	57	–	Mobile Home
