= Lena Fiagbe =

British singer

Lena Joanne Fiagbe is a British pop-soul singer-songwriter, best known for her 1993 UK top 20 hit single, "Gotta Get It Right". She was signed to U2's record label, Mother Records.

== Chart career ==
Fiagbe's debut single, "You Come from Earth", was released in July 1993, with the single billed simply to 'Lena'. It was widely expected to chart well and had preemptive inclusion on the compilation album, Now That's What I Call Music 25, with the inner booklet predicting that the single was 'chart-bound'. However, despite inclusion on Now 25 and a playlisting on BBC Radio 1, it stalled at number 69 in the UK Singles Chart.

Fiagbe's second single, "Gotta Get It Right", was released in November 1993, with her name now being credited in full as Lena Fiagbe. The single reached the UK top 40, charting at number 25 on the rundown of 23 October 1993 and peaking at number 20 a week later. This was the second single by Fiagbe to appear on the NOW numbered series, being included on Now That's What I Call Music 26.

These singles are included on Fiagbe's debut album, Visions, which was released on Mother Records in 1994 to critical acclaim from the music press globally. It also includes the single "What's It Like to Be Beautiful", which reached number 52 in the UK in April 1994, and the title track, "Visions", which was also released as a single and reached number 48 in June 1994. "Is It Because" was the fifth and final single from the album, reaching number 87 in November. In addition to the singles, Fiagbe recorded a cover version of Barry Manilow's "Can't Smile Without You" for the Four Weddings and a Funeral soundtrack album, while in 1996, she provided guest vocals for the Wasis Diop single "African Dream", which was a minor hit, peaking at number 44 in the UK Singles Chart. "African Dream" was Fiagbe's last charting hit.

== UK chart singles discography ==
- "You Come From Earth" (1993) – UK No. 69 †
- "Gotta Get It Right" (1993) - UK No. 20
- "What's It Like to Be Beautiful" (1994) - UK No. 52
- "Visions" (1994) - UK No. 48
- "Is It Because" (1994) - UK No. 87
- "African Dream" (1996) – UK #44‡

† Credited to Lena
‡ Credited to Wasis Diop featuring Lena Fiagbe
