= South Atlantic Review =

- Discipline: Language, literature
- Language: English
- Edited by: Barton Palmer

Publication details
- Former name(s): South Atlantic Bulletin
- History: 1935-present
- Publisher: South Atlantic Modern Language Association (United States)
- Frequency: Quarterly

Standard abbreviations
- ISO 4: South Atl. Rev.

Indexing
- ISSN: 0277-335X
- LCCN: 81642104
- JSTOR: 0277335X
- OCLC no.: 58839839

Links
- Journal homepage; Online tables of content

The South Atlantic Review is a quarterly peer-reviewed academic journal published by the South Atlantic Modern Language Association. It was established in 1935 and publishes articles and reviews in the fields of language and literature. As of Summer 2014, its editor-in-chief is Barton Palmer.
