= Mother Records =

Former Irish music label

- Parent company: Island Records
- Founded: 19 October 1983
- Founder: U2
- Status: Defunct
- Genre: Alternative rock, electronic, jazz, pop, psychedelic rock, reggae, rock, soul
- Country of origin: Republic of Ireland
- Location: 92 Merrion Road, Ballsbridge, Dublin

Mother Records was a record label founded by the band U2 in 1983 and distributed by parent Island Records. As a supportive promotional platform, the label released several one-off single releases for The Hothouse Flowers, In Tua Nua and Cactus World News among others.

== History ==
The label was registered on 19 October 1983, and subsequently launched on 1 August 1984 by U2. Initially, the label released only 'one-off' singles promoting Irish artists. The debut single was In Tua Nua's "Coming Thru", and Bono's first producer credit for Cactus World News's "The Bridge".

In 1990, the label was relaunched as an independent record company. The debut artists for the revamped label were The Golden Horde, Bumble , and Engine Alley. The Golden Horde charted with the singles "Friends in Time" and "100 Boys", and their album release, produced by Daniel Rey & Andy Shernoff (eponymously 'The Golden Horde'), was voted joint #1 record with U2's Achtung Baby in the prestigious Hot Press Music Awards of 1991. Bumble's genre-bending 'West in Motion' received a re-release in 2022. Engine Alley's debut album A Sonic Holiday, produced by Steve Lillywhite, was released in 1992.

Other artists to join the label's roster were Longpigs, Alicia Bridges, Björk, Tanita Tikaram, Lena Fiagbe, Audioweb, and Adam Clayton's and Larry Mullen's "Theme From Mission: Impossible".

In 1997, the U2 PopMart Mix of M's "Pop Muzik" was released for Mother Records and was under license to Island Records on U2 releases.

The label ceased operations in 2000. Yet according to the Irish Companies Registration Office (CRO), it was dissolved only on 14 October 2011 and was registered at their former accountant's former office.
