= Stephen Fellows =

English singer, songwriter and musician

Stephen Fellows is an English singer, songwriter and musician. From 1978 to 1995, he was frontman for the band The Comsat Angels. He also managed the band Gomez and helped guide the band the Little Glitches.

Fellows' first post-Comsat Angels work was Mood X, a 1997 album consisting of 15 tracks of atmospheric guitar with no vocals. In July 2008, he posted five songs to his Myspace page that he recorded in the mid-1990s.

In January 2020 Fellows released a new 10 track solo album called Slow Glass.

Fellows lives and works in Sheffield, England.
