= Kevin Bacon (producer) =

English musician and record producer

Kevin John Bacon (born 30 March 1959 in Rotherham, Yorkshire, England) is an English musician and record producer best known for his work with Jonathan Quarmby under the moniker Bacon & Quarmby, as well as his tenure as bassist for the band the Comsat Angels. After leaving the Comsat Angels, Kevin Bacon produced for many other artists, notably Finley Quaye, Longpigs and Ziggy Marley.

A native of Alfreton, Derbyshire, Bacon's introduction to the record industry came in 1978 when he helped found the Comsat Angels. The Comsats went on to release eight albums with Bacon on the Polydor, Jive and Island labels before he departed the band in 1989 to focus on record production and artist development in partnership with Quarmby. The duo worked with artists as diverse as Finley Quaye, the Pretenders, David Bowie and Ziggy Marley, who achieved both Grammy and Brit awards. Bacon was also an A&R consultant for Island Records and developed joint venture businesses with Universal Publishing and TVT Records. Bacon and his production partner Quarmby later founded the company AWAL.

== Selected discography (as Bacon & Quarmby) ==
=== Production ===
- Ephraim Lewis – Skin (1992)
- Longpigs – The Sun Is Often Out (1996)
- Longpigs – Mobile Home (1999)
- Ziggy Marley & the Melody Makers – Fallen Is Babylon (1997)
- The Pretenders – Loose Screw (2002)
- Finley Quaye – Maverick a Strike (1997)
- Beth Rowley – Little Dreamer (2007)
- Sugababes – "Round Round" single (2002)
- Oi Va Voi – Laughter Through Tears (2004)
- Oi Va Voi – Travelling the Face of the Globe (2009)
- Beverley Knight – "Soul Survivor" (2010)
- Iwan Rheon – Changing Times EP

=== Mixing ===
- Ian Brown – "Can't See Me" single (1998)
- Eagle-Eye Cherry – "Save Tonight" single (1997)
- The Stands – All Years Leaving (2004)
