= Best Ai =

Greatest hits album by Ai
- Released: September 16, 2009
- Recorded: 2003–2009
- Genre: R&B; hip hop; J-pop
- Length: 79:13
- Label: Island; Universal Sigma

Ai chronology
Viva Ai (2009)	Best Ai (2009)	The Last Ai (2010)

Best Ai is the first greatest hits album by Japanese-American singer-songwriter Ai, released on September 16, 2009, by Island Records and Universal Sigma. The album was released in three editions: limited CD+DVD, CD only and "Arienai Price" (low-priced) editions. Best Ai debuted at number 2 on the daily Oricon albums chart but switched back and forth between number 1 and number 2 several times during its release week. The album went on to debut atop the weekly albums chart with 81,663 copies sold, beating the second-place holder Takeshi Tsuruno's Tsuruno Oto by merely 1,332 units and becoming her first number-one album.

The album is certified Platinum for shipment of 250,000 copies.

== Track listing ==
No.	Title	Lyrics	Music	Length
1.	"Story"	Ai	2 Soul	4:50
2.	"Believe"	Ai	Ai, DJ Yutaka, Jin	5:14
3.	"One"	Ai	Toshiaki Matsumoto	5:04
4.	"You Are My Star"	Ai	Ai, Uta	4:39
5.	"So Special" (with Atsushi)	Ai, Atsushi	Ai, Atsushi, Uta	4:14
6.	"Taisetsu na Mono" (大切なもの "Precious Things")	Ai	Ai, The Company	5:18
7.	"Okuribito" (おくりびと "Departures")	Ai	Joe Hisaishi	3:40
8.	"I'll Remember You"	Ai	Ai, Jonas Jeberg, Anders Bagge, Sylvia Bennett-smith, Marc Smith	4:00
9.	"My Friend" (マイ☆フレンド)	Ai	Ai, Kazunori Fujimoto	4:27
10.	"Music"	Ai	T. Kura, Ai	3:59
11.	"I Wanna Know"	Ai	Ai, DJ Watarai, Jin	4:15
12.	"Life"	Ai, Stephanie Stokes Fountain	Ai, Stephanie Stokes Fountain	4:56
13.	"E.O."	Ai	2 Soul	4:01
14.	"Another Day"	Ai	Ai, Daniel O. Morgan, Icedown	5:27
15.	"365" (featuring Deli)	Ai, Deli	Aquarius, Ai	4:10
16.	"Last Words" (最終宣告)	Ai	Ai, Lofey, Skane Management, Desert Storm	3:26
17.	"All For You" (Movie Short Version)	Ai, Daisuke "D.I" Imai	Daisuke "D.I" Imai	2:01
18.	"Story" (Re-born)	Ai	2 Soul	5:32

Limited edition DVD
No.	Title	Length
1.	"Last Words" (Music Video)
2.	"Thank U" (Music Video)
3.	"My Friend" (Music Video)
4.	"Story" (Music Video)
5.	"Believe" (Music Video)
6.	"I Wanna Know" (Music Video)
7.	Untitled (featuring Deli) (Music Video)

"Arienai Price" edition
No.	Title	Lyrics	Music	Length
1.	"Story"	Ai	2 Soul	4:50
2.	"Believe"	Ai	Ai, DJ Yutaka, Jin	5:14
3.	"One"	Ai	Toshiaki Matsumoto	5:04
4.	"You Are My Star"	Ai	Ai, Uta	4:39
5.	"So Special" (with Atsushi)	Ai, Atsushi	Ai, Atsushi, Uta	4:14
6.	"Taisetsu na Mono"	Ai	Ai, The Company	5:18
7.	"Okuribito"	Ai	Joe Hisaishi	3:40
8.	"I'll Remember You"	Ai	Ai, Jonas Jeberg, Anders Bagge, Sylvia Bennett-smith, Marc Smith	4:00
9.	"My Friend"	Ai	Ai, Kazunori Fujimoto	4:27
10.	"Music"	Ai	T. Kura, Ai	3:59
11.	"I Wanna Know"	Ai	Ai, DJ Watarai, Jin	4:15
12.	"Life"	Ai, Stephanie Stokes Fountain	Ai, Stephanie Stokes Fountain	4:56
13.	"E.O."	Ai	2 Soul	4:01
14.	"Another Day"	Ai	Ai, Daniel O. Morgan, Icedown	5:27
15.	"365" (featuring Deli)	Ai, Deli	Aquarius, Ai	4:10
16.	"Last Words"	Ai	Ai, Lofey, Skane Management, Desert Storm	3:26

== Charts ==
=== Weekly charts ===
Weekly chart performance for Best Ai
Chart (2009–2010)	Peak position
Japanese Albums (Oricon)	1
Japan Albums Chart (SoundScan) CD+DVD	2
Japan Albums Chart (SoundScan) CD-only	4
Japanese Top Albums (Billboard Japan)	1
Taiwan J-Pop Chart (G-Music)	18
Taiwan J-Pop/K-Pop Chart (Five Music)	14
South Korean Albums (Circle)	46

=== Monthly charts ===
Monthly chart performance for Best Ai
Chart (2009)	Peak position
Japanese Albums (Oricon)	5

=== Year-end charts ===
Year-end chart performance for Best Ai
Chart (2009)	Position
Japanese Albums (Oricon)	35

== Certifications ==
Certifications and sales for Best Ai
Region	Certification	Certified units/sales
Japan (RIAJ)	Platinum	250,000^{^}
^{^} Shipments figures based on certification alone.

== See also ==
- List of Oricon number-one albums of 2009
