= Still... =

- Digital single cover (Note: On the physical release, Ai and AK-69 are in different positions.)

Single by Ai featuring AK-69

from the album The Last Ai
- B-side: "For My Sister" "Wavin' Flag Coca Celebration Mix"
- Released: June 30, 2010
- Genre: Hip hop; R&B
- Length: 4:11
- Label: Island; Universal Sigma
- Songwriter(s): Takeshi Hiroki; Ai Uemura
- Producer(s): DJ Watari; Jin

Ai singles chronology
| "Fake" (2010) | "Still..." (2010) | "Nemurenai Machi" (2010) |

Music video
- "Stil..." on YouTube

"Still..." is a song recorded by Japanese-American singer-songwriter Ai featuring Japanese hip hop artist AK-69. It was released on June 30, 2010, by Island Records and Universal Sigma as the second single from Ai's eighth studio album, The Last Ai.

== Background ==
"Still..." was announced on May 10, 2010 as the second single in celebration of Ai's tenth anniversary in the music industry. The B-side of the single was also announced, "For My Sister" featuring Judith Hill. A music video was released on Universal Music Japan's YouTube channel prior to the physical and digital release of the single.

In an interview with Barks, Ai said the theme of the song was to "face our dreams".

== Track listing ==
Still... – Maxi CD single
| No. | Title | Writer(s) | Producer(s) | Length |
|---|---|---|---|---|
| 1. | "Still..." (featuring AK-69) | Ai Uemura; Takeshi Hiroki | DJ Watari; Jin | 4:11 |
| 2. | "For My Sister" (featuring Judith Hill) | Uemura; Hill | Uta | 4:08 |
| 3. | "Wavin' Flag Coca Celebration Mix" (duet with K'naan) | Keinan Abdi Warsame; Bruno Mars; Philip Lawrence; Jean Daval | The Smeezingtons | 3:39 |
| 4. | "Wavin' Flag Coca Celebration Mix" (Version Ai) | Warsame; Mars; Lawrence; Daval | Uta | 3:49 |

Still... – First Press Limited edition
| No. | Title | Length |
|---|---|---|
| 1. | "Still..." (music video and behind the scenes) |

== Charts ==
"Still..." debuted and peaked at number 15 on the Japan Oricon Singles chart, charting for five weeks. On the Billboard Japan Hot 100, the song debuted and peaked at number 27, charting for one week.

| Chart (2010) | Peak position |
|---|---|
| Japan Singles Chart (Oricon) | 15 |
| Japan Hot 100 (Billboard Japan) | 27 |
