= The Last Ai =

Studio album by Ai
- Released: December 1, 2010
- Recorded: 2009–2010
- Studio: Studio MSR (Tokyo, Japan); Azabu-O Studio (Minato); DSR (Hollywood, California); Sony Music Studios (Tokyo); Little Big Room (Burbank); Flyte Tyme Studios (Santa Monica)
- Genre: J-pop; R&B; hip hop
- Length: 41:36
- Language: Japanese; English
- Label: Island; Universal Sigma
- Producer: Uta; Jeff Miyahara; T-Kura; The Smeezingtons; DJ Watari; Suamana "Swoop" Brown

Ai chronology
Best Ai (2009)	The Last Ai (2010)	Independent (2012)

Singles from The Last Ai
- 1. "Fake" Released: March 31, 2010; 2. "Still..." Released: June 30, 2010; 3. "Nemurenai Machi" Released: August 25, 2010; 4. "Stronger" Released: October 27, 2010

The Last Ai (stylized THE LAST A.I.) is the eighth studio album by Japanese-American singer-songwriter Ai, released on December 1, 2010, by Island Records and Universal Sigma. The album features guest appearances and collaborations from Namie Amuro, Snoop Dogg, Kato Miliyah, AK-69, Judith Hill, Boyz II Men, K'naan and Chaka Khan.

Four singles were released from The Last Ai. The lead single, "Fake" was certified gold by the RIAJ, peaking at number 5 on the Billboard Japan Hot 100 while "Still..." and "Stronger" charted within the top 30 of the Japan Hot 100.

== Background ==
The reason for giving the meaningful title "Last Ai" is that "I can't say yet" ... Would you like [me] to stop singing? That's not the case! I want to aim for the Grammy Awards, and I want to send music to the world including Japan, so I'm relieved for the future.

— Ai reflecting on the future of her career

Ai previously released her 2009 compilation album, Best Ai which became her first album to chart number one on the Oricon Japanese Albums chart. Her 2009 studio album, Viva Ai, also performed well commercially.

In September 2010, the title of the album was revealed and was slated for release in December later that year. With the release of "Stronger" featuring Miliyah as the fourth single and its B-side track featuring American rapper Snoop Dogg, Ai revealed multiple artists from the west coast would be featured on the album. In November 2010, the track listing and album cover was revealed.

== Track listing ==
The Last Ai – Standard edition
No.	Title	Writer(s)	Length
1.	"Fake" (featuring Namie Amuro)	Ai Uemura; George Tashiro	4:15
2.	"Let It Go" (featuring Snoop Dogg)	Uemura; Cordell Broadus; DJ2High; Uta; Tynice Hinton	3:36
3.	"Stronger" (featuring Miliyah)	Uemura; Miliyah; T.kura	5:02
4.	"Still..." (featuring AK-69)	Uemura; AK-69	4:10
5.	"For My Sister" (English Version, featuring Judith Hill)	Uemura; Judith Hill; Uta	4:08
6.	"Incomplete" (featuring Boyz II Men)	Uemura; Jeff Miyahara	5:14
7.	"One More Try" (featuring Chaka Khan)	A.Coley; C. Mortimer; Suamana "Swoop" Brown	3:49
8.	"Family"	Uemura; Miyahara; Jeremy Soule	3:58
9.	"Nemurenai Machi" (眠れない街, Sleepless Town)	Uemura; Uta	3:41
10.	"Wavin' Flag Coca-Cola Celebration Mix" (K'naan featuring Ai)	Andrew Bloch; Bruno Mars; Edmond Dunne; Jean Duval; Keinan Abdi Warsame; Phillip Lawrence	3:38

The Last Ai – Limited edition
No.	Title	Writer(s)	Length
11.	"Through the Fire" (with Chaka Khan)	David Foster; Tom Keane; Cynthia Weil	4:52

The Last Ai – Limited edition bonus DVD
No.	Title	Director(s)	Length
1.	"Fake" (featuring Namie Amuro) (music video)	Ugichin
2.	"Still..." (featuring AK-69) (music video)	Masaki Bamba
3.	"Let It Go" (featuring Snoop Dogg) (music video)	Tanaka Taro
4.	"Behind the Scenes"	Masaki Matsuda; Takashi Mukainakano

== Personnel ==
Credits adapted from album's liner notes.

Musicians

- Ai Carina Uemura – lead vocals, songwriting
- George Tashiro – songwriting
- Uta – arrangement, production, songwriting, composition
- Namie Amuro – featured artist, vocals
- Cordell Broadus – songwriting
- DJ2High – composition
- Snoop Dogg – featured artist
- Miliyah Kato – featured artist, songwriting, vocals
- T. Kura – production
- AK-69 – featured artist, vocals, songwriting
- Jin – composition
- DJ Watarai – production, composition
- Masa Kohama – guitar
- Judith Hill – featured artist, vocals, songwriting
- Jeff Miyahara – production, songwriting
- Yuichi Hayashida – composition
- Boyz II Men – featured artist
- Nathan Morris – vocals
- Shawn Stockman – vocals
- Wanya Morris – vocals
- Suamana "Swoop" Brown – production, songwriting, instruments
- C. Mortimer – songwriting
- Alia Coley – songwriting, background vocals
- Erik Hammer – guitar
- Tim Lou – cello
- Geott Osika – bass
- Lisa Liu – violin
- Mark Robertson – violin
- Chaka Khan – featured artist, vocals
- Jeremey Soule – composition
- Andrew Bloch – songwriting
- Bruno Mars – songwriting
- Edmond Dunne – songwriting
- Jean Duval – songwriting
- Keinan Abdi Warsame – songwriting
- Phillip Lawrence – songwriting
- The Smeezingtons – production
- David Foster – songwriting
- Tom Keane – songwriting
- Cynthia Weil – songwriting

Technical

- Ai Carina Uemura – executive production
- Ryosuke Kataoka – vocal engineering
- D.O.I – mixing
- DJ2High – coordination
- Okuda Supa – vocal engineering
- Travis "Shaggy" Marshal – vocal engineering
- Yasuaki Sakuma – vocal engineering
- Neeraj Khajanchi – vocal engineering
- Hiroaki Okuda – recording engineering
- Hiroki Soshi – recording engineering assistant
- Satoshi Hosoi – mixing
- Suamana "Swoop" Brown – vocal arrangement
- Masashi Kubo – mixing
- Masato Kamata – vocal editing
- Phil Tan – mixing
- Dave McNair – mastering
- Tremaine "Six 7" Williams – vocal engineering
- Tiger – vocal direction

Visuals and imagery

- Toshiya Ohno – art direction
- Kenjiro Harigai – designer
- Kyosuke Ochiai – coordination
- Yasunari Kikuma – photography
- Noriko Goto – styling
- Akemi Ono – hair, makeup
- Akilla – tattoo designer
- Hitomi Miyamoto – artwork coordination

== Chart performance ==
The Last Ai debuted and peaked at number 14 on the Japanese Oricon Albums chart, charting for eight weeks.

Chart performance for The Last AiChart performance for The Last Ai
Chart (2010)	Peak position
Japanese Albums (Oricon)	14

== Release history ==
Release history and formats for The Last Ai
Region	Date	Format(s)	Version	Label	Ref.
Japan	December 1, 2010	CD; digital download; streaming	Original	Island; Universal Sigma	
Japan	December 1, 2010	CD; DVD	Limited	Island; Universal Sigma	
Various	December 5, 2012	CD; digital download; streaming	Original	USM Japan	
