= Nemurenai Machi =

Single by Ai

from the album The Last Ai
- B-side: "For My Sister (Japanese Version)"
- Released: September 6, 2010
- Genre: R&B; J-pop
- Length: 3:42
- Label: Island; Universal Sigma
- Songwriter(s): Ai Uemura
- Producer(s): Uta

Ai singles chronology
"Still..." (2010)	"Nemurenai Machi" (2010)	"Stronger" (2010)

Music video
- "Nemurenai Machi" on YouTube

"Nemurenai Machi" (眠れない街) is a song written and recorded by Japanese-American singer-songwriter Ai, released September 6, 2010, by Island Records and Universal Sigma. The song served as the third single from Ai's eighth studio album, The Last Ai and as the theme song for the ANB drama, Keishicho Keizoku Sosakan.

== Background ==
In celebration of her tenth anniversary in the music industry, Ai released two previous singles, "Fake" and "Still...". Both singles were commercially successful, charting within the top 20 of the Oricon Singles Chart and the top 30 on the Billboard Japan Hot 100.

== Track listing ==
All tracks produced by Uta.

Nemurenai Machi – Maxi single
No.	Title	Writer(s)	Length
1.	"Nemurenai Machi"	Ai Uemura	3:42
2.	"For My Sister" (Japanese version featuring Judith Hill)	Uemura; Hill	4:09
3.	"Nemurenai Machi" (instrumental)	Uemura	3:42

== Charts ==
"Nemurenai Machi" peaked at number 60 on the Oricon Singles Chart, charting for three weeks. On the Japan Hot 100, the song debuted and peaked at number 53 for the week of September 8, 2010. It fell off the chart after one week.

Chart (2010)	Peak position
Japan Singles Chart (Oricon)	60
Japan Hot 100 (Billboard Japan)	53
