= Back in time =

Back in time may refer to:

== Film and television ==
- Back in Time (2015 film), a 2015 American documentary directed by Jason Aron
- "Back in Time", the fourth episode of the American adult animated television series Sit Down, Shut Up
- Back in Time for..., a British lifestyle television series
- Fleet of Time (also Back in Time), a 2014 Chinese coming-of-age film

== Music ==
=== Albums ===
- Back in Time (James Blood Ulmer album), by Odyssey the Band
- Back in Time (Judith Hill album), by American recording artist Judith Hill

=== Songs ===
- "Back in Time" (Huey Lewis and the News song), written for and featured in the 1985 film Back to the Future
- "Back in Time" (Pitbull song), originally released as the lead single from the soundtrack of sci-fi film Men in Black 3
- "Back in Time", by McBusted from McBusted, 2014
- "Back in Time", the 14th track from Seventh Wonder's 2008 album Mercy Falls
- "The Roof (Back in Time)", a song by American singer-songwriter Mariah Carey
- "Regal Ruin: Back In Time", a song from the Sonic R soundtrack

== Other ==
- Back in Time (iOS software), an education book app
- Back in Time (Linux software), a backup application
