= Viva Ai =

- Digital cover

Studio album by Ai
- Released: March 4, 2009
- Recorded: 2008–2009
- Studio: Music Safety Research (Yoyogi, Tokyo); Prime Sound Studio Form (Meguro, Tokyo); Studio Blan (Setagaya, Tokyo); Purple Brain Studio (Tokyo); Jeberg & Cut Studio (Copenhagen, Denmark); Storm Studios (Oslo, Norway); Avex Studio (Tokyo); Victor Studio (Shibuya, Tokyo)
- Genre: R&B; pop; electronica; classical
- Length: 68:09
- Language: Japanese; English
- Label: Island; Universal Sigma
- Producer: Uta; Kocky; Atsushi; Bach Logic; DJ Watarai; Jonas Jeberg; Mats Valentin; DJ Watari; The Company; Joe Hisaishi

Ai chronology
| Don't Stop Ai (2007) | Viva Ai (2009) | Best Ai (2009) |

Singles from Viva Ai
- 1. "So Special" / "Okuribito" Released: September 10, 2008; 2. "You Are My Star" Released: February 4, 2009

Viva Ai (stylized as ViVa A.I.) is the seventh studio album by Japanese–American singer-songwriter Ai, released March 4, 2009, by Island Records and Universal Sigma. It featured three singles, the 2008 theme song for the film Departures, "Okuribito," a collaboration single with Exile vocalist Atsushi called "So Special" and the preceding single, "You Are My Star."

== Background and development ==
Six months after Ai released her sixth album, Don't Stop Ai, she released a re-cut single from that album, a ballad called "Taisetsu na Mono." Both of the B-sides from the single, "Feel for You" and "Touch the Sky" appear on Viva Ai. At the same time, she released a single with Anna Tsuchiya called "Crazy World," which was the first time Ai was a billed artist on a single since Suite Chic's "Uh Uh......" and Michico's "Gold Digga" in 2003.

In July 2008, Ai was featured on an R&B mid-tempo song called "So Special," by Exile member Atsushi, released on Exile's compilation album Exile Entertainment Best. The song was later re-arranged into an Ai version, and was released as one of the A-sides of her September 2009 single. The other A-side, "Okuribito," is the eponymous theme song for the Academy Award winning Yōjirō Takita film Departures.

After a gap of five months, Ai released "You Are My Star," an upbeat R&B track a month before the album.

== Writing and production ==
"So Special (Version Ai)"
Ai sung a duet with Atsushi Sato from Exile in 2008. The song was released in two versions, with the Ai version serving as a single for the album.

"Okuribito"
The vocal edition of Joe Hisaishi's orechestral theme song to Departures was one of the album's singles.

"You Are My Star"
An uptempo R&B song with a four on the floor rhythm pattern, "You Are My Star" was the preceding single before the album's release.

The album has a wide number of genres on it, including R&B, pop, rock, neoclassical and 1970s style R&B. Ai saw the album as a challenge, as she wanted to do as many new things as she could. Ai worked with Japanese producer Uta for the first time, who produced much of the album: "Kimi to Ita Basho," "Like a Bird," "So Special," "You Are My Star," and co-produced "People in the World" with DJ Watarai. Ai had not worked with DJ Watarai since 2006's "I Wanna Know." He also produced the song "Rose."

The album is the second to feature Scandinavian producers. "I'll Remember You/Brand New Day" (2007) producer Jonas Jeberg returns on the song "Fire!" new collaborators include Mats Valentin on "Day Vacation" and dance musicians Kocky (David Åström) and Trash (Patrik Jan Berggren) produced "My Angel," as well as the two remixes. Ai travelled to Sweden and Denmark for the first time, to meet with three production teams, producers and to record the songs.

Three previous collaborators were reunited with Ai for individual songs. "Nobody Like You" featured Icedown ("Mirai" (2006), "Queen" (2005)), "Feel for You" was produced by Bach Logic ("Get Up" (2007)) and "Touch the Sky" by The Company ("Butterfly." "Taisetsu na Mono" and "The Answer" from Don't Stop Ai (2007)). Two songs featured new collaborators, Kei Kumasa for "Scream," and classical pianist Joe Hisaishi for "Okuribito." The song "Okuribito" was already produced for the film, and the single version features Ai's vocals (with self-penned lyrics) layered on top of the instrumental theme. The song with Ai does not actually feature in the film, but as used in promotion for the film.

Ai collaborated with three Japanese musicians and one overseas musician on the album, "So Special" with Exile Atsushi, "Scream" featuring vocalist Jesse from Rize, and "Like a Bird" featuring reggae singer Corn Head. Ai had been friends with Atsushi since 2006, and had wanted to collaborate for some time. The idea was brought up by Atsushi, and the pair wrote and recorded the song with Uta in three weeks. The Ai version features a slightly different song structure, melody and lyrics. Trackmaker Uta made the Ai Version with a little more beat, to be more "dancable" than the Exile version.

One of the remixes was of the James Morrison song "Broken Strings," which featured Ai instead of Nelly Furtado on the Japanese version of his album, Songs for You, Truths for Me. His album was released in Japan on the same day as Viva Ai.

Recording was primarily done at Music Safety Research in Yoyogi, Tokyo, where almost all of Ai's vocals were recorded. Additional recording was performed at Prime Sound Studio Form and Studio Blan. Recording with Jesse from Rize was held at his private studio, Purple Brain Studio. Recording with Exile's Atsushi Sato was at Avex Studio, and the initial recording of the theme from Departures was recorded at Victor Studios. Recording in Europe was at Jeberg & Cut Studio in Copenhagen, and Storm Studios in Oslo.

"People in the World" was made especially for the film Lalapio, and the director requested "a little bit funky 1970s disco soul" song. "Feel for You" was inspired by the film Cloverfield, and what Ai would say if it were her last day on earth. "Rose" is a song inspired by what Ai saw on the news in 2008, similar to "I Wanna Know" in 2006.

The album title was suggested by Singaporean photographer Leslie Kee, while they were shooting the album covers together.

== Promotion and concerts ==
The album featured a wide variety of tie-ups. The two wider scale ones were "Okuribito" being used as the vocal theme for the film Departures, and "You Are My Star" in a TV commercial for Menard 'facial salon' cosmetics. Two songs were used as temporary theme songs for music shows, "So Special" was used as the Music Fighter power play song, and "You Are My Star" used as the theme of Mainichi TV's Weekly Music Magazine Hz. "People in the World" received two tie-ups. One as the film Lalapio's theme song, and the other as the fashion event Kobe Collection's 2009 Spring/Summer event theme song.

Ai first performed "Okuribito" on Music Fair, on September 6, 2008. She performed "So Special" with Atsushi on Music Station on September 12. On January 16, 2009, she performed "You Are My Star" at Music Station, and again at Music Japan on February 5. Ai sung "People in the World" at a surprise appearance at an event for Lalapio on January 28, at Club Heights in Kabukicho, Tokyo. Ai performed at Marui City mall in Shibuya to 500 people on March 5, 2009. She performed "You Are My Star," and "Scream" with Jesse.

Ai's tour for the album, Viva Ai Japan Tour, was her largest tour yet, performing at 40 dates across Japan beginning in April, and ending in July.

== Critical reception ==
Professional ratings
Review scores
| Source | Rating |
|---|---|
| Allmusic | 3.5/5 stars |
| CDJournal | (favorable) |
| Listen Japan | (favorable) |

Reviewers were generally very positive about the album. CDJournal gave a special recommendation star for the album, believing Ai was "maturing as a singer," and that her works were increasingly solid. They praised the "seductive rap" in "My Angel," he "beautiful melodies and silky vocals" of "So Special." Listen Japan reviewer Morio Mori felt it was a "colourful album" that was very "positive and challenging," and that the album should once again be another of AI's masterpieces. He felt that "Okuribito" was "an ideal ballad."

Adam Greenberg of Allmusic gave the album 3.5 stars out of 5, feeling that "some [genre experiments] succeed and some fail a bit, but [Ai] keeps the interest level fairly high." Greenberg enjoyed the second half of the album more, and fel that "So Special" was a highlight of the album, but felt vocals on "People in the World" and "Fire" were "overly stereotypical powerful-vocal R&B."

In 2009, the music video for "Okuribito" was nominated for the 2009 MTV Video Music Awards Japan award for Best Video from a Film, but lost to Remioromen's "Yume no Tsubomi."

== Chart performance ==
The album debuted at number 10 in Japan with 18,000 copies sold, her lowest first week since 2003's Original Ai. The album did not have sustained longevity, quickly dropping out of the top 10, and charting for a total of 10 weeks. It sold a total of 37,000 copies, and as of 2012, the album is Ai's second worst performing original album. The album was her first since Original Ai in 2003 to not receive a certification from the RIAJ.

In Taiwan, the album debuted at number 16 on the Japanese/Korean sub-chart, but did not chart in the top 20 for the main combination chart. The album stayed one week in the top 20.

== Track listing ==
CD
| No. | Title | Lyrics | Music | Arranger(s) | Length |
|---|---|---|---|---|---|
| 1. | "You Are My Star" | Ai | Uta, Ai | | 4:38 |
| 2. | "My Angel" | Ai | Kocky, Trash, Ai | | 4:51 |
| 3. | "So Special" (Version Ai) (featuring Exile Atsushi) | Ai, Exile Atsushi | Uta, Ai, Exile Atsushi | | 4:12 |
| 4. | "Kimi to Ita Basho" (君といた場所 "A Place I Was with You") | Ai | Uta, Ai | | 4:24 |
| 5. | "Feel for You" | Ai | Bach Logic, Ai | | 4:27 |
| 6. | "Scream" (featuring Jesse from Rize) | Ai, Jesse | Ai, Jesse | Kei Kusama | 3:22 |
| 7. | "People in the World" | Ai | DJ Watarai, Uta, Ai | | 3:14 |
| 8. | "Fire!" | Ai | Jonas Jeberg, Ai | | 3:25 |
| 9. | "Like a Bird" (featuring Corn Head) | Ai, Corn Head | Uta, Ai | | 5:27 |
| 10. | "Day Vacation" | Ai | Mats Valentin, Ai | Andreas Andersson | 3:07 |
| 11. | "Nobody Like You" | Ai | Icedown, Ai | | 4:12 |
| 12. | "Rose" | Ai | DJ Watarai, Ai | | 4:21 |
| 13. | "Touch the Sky" | Ai | The Company, Ai | | 4:38 |
| 14. | "Okuribito" (おくりびと "Senders") | Ai | Joe Hisaishi | Joe Hisaishi | 3:39 |
| 15. | "You Are My Star (Kocky & Trash Remix)" | Ai | Uta, Ai | | 4:49 |
| 16. | "Broken Strings (Kocky & Trash Remix)*" (James Morrison featuring Ai) | J. Morrison, Fraser T Smith, Nina Woodford | J. Morrison, F. Smith, N. Woodford | | 5:23 |
| Total length: | | | | | 68:09 |

DVD
| No. | Title | Length |
|---|---|---|
| 1. | "You Are My Star" (Music video) |
| 2. | "Making of VIVA A.I." |

*CD+DVD edition bonus track.

== Personnel ==
Personnel details were sourced from Viva Ai's liner notes booklet.

Managerial

- Yuki Arai – executive producer
- Naoshi Fujikura – executive producer
- Hiroaki "P. Gutta" Doi – A&R for Bach Logic (#5)
- Kaz Koike – executive producer
- Daniel Larsson – production coordination (#2, No. 10, #15, #16)
- Kenya Orita – executive producer (#2, #8, #10, #15, #16)
- Koichi Sakakibara – artist management
- Tsutomu Satoru – musician coordination (#14)
- Akira Tsukahara – production coordination (#2, #8, #10, #15, #16)
- Hide Yasuda – A&R administration

Performance credits

- Ai – vocals, background vocals
- Akira – bass (#7)
- Andreas Andersson – saxophone (#10)
- David Åström – drums, keyboards, (#2)
- Patrik Jan Berggren – drums, guitars, keyboards (#2)
- Corn Head – vocals (#9)
- Nobuo Furukawa – v. cello (#14)
- Gakushi – guitars (#13)
- Shohei Hirata – v. cello (#14)
- Masaaki Hori – percussion (#14)
- Icedown – all instruments (#11)
- Hiroya Ichi – v. cello (#14)
- Ryoji Ihara – tenor sax (#8)
- Masato Ishinari – guitars (#7)
- Jonas Jeberg – all instruments (#8)
- Daisuke Kitaguchi – v. cello (#14)
- Futoshi Kobayashi – flugelhorn, trumpet (#8)
- Erika Makioka – v. cello (#14)
- Yohei Matsuoka – v. cello (#14)
- Tomoko Matsui – timpani (#14)
- Jesse McFaddin – vocals (#6)
- Hiroshi Miyasaka – v. cello (#14)
- James Morrison – vocals (#16)
- Hiroki Nakayama – flute (#14)
- Megumi Nakayama – clarinet (#14)
- Jun Oshima – v. cello (#14)
- Kiyoshi Saito – oboe (#14)
- Masamichi Sasazaki – bassoon (#14)
- Atsushi Sato – vocals (#3)
- Yuji Shimoda – trombone (#8)
- Mikael Sörensen – trumpet (#10)
- Aya Sugira – v. cello (#14)
- Yuko Taguchi – harp (#14)
- Junko Takahashi – v. cello (#14)
- Yota Takahashi – contrabass (#14)
- Wakana Tatezumi – flute (#14)
- Mats Valentin – guitars, keyboards (#10)
- Takehiko Yamada – piano (#14)
- Osamu Yamamoto – contrabass (#14)
- Shunsuke Yamauchi – v. cello (#14)
- Junpei Yanase – v. cello (#14)

Visuals and imagery

- Leslie Kee – design, photographer

Technical and production

- Ai – vocal production (#2, No. 8, #10)
- Hiroyuki Akita – instrument recording (#14)
- Andreas Andersson – brass arrangement (#10)
- Takeshi Baba – recording (#6)
- Bach Logic – production (#5)
- C-murder – pre-production recording (#4–#5, No. 7, #12), recording (#5)
- The Company – production (#13)
- Tom Coyne – mastering
- DJ Watarai – production (#7, #12)
- D.O.I – mixing (#1–#9, #11–#14)
- Koji Haishima – conductor (#14)
- Joe Hisaishi – production (#14)
- Icedown – production, programming (#11)
- Hiromitsu Inoue – assistant recording (#14)
- Jonas Jeberg – production, recording (#8)
- Masahiro Kawata – pre-production recording (#3), recording (#3)
- Kocky & Trash – production (#2), programming (#2), remixing (#15–#16)
- Kohei Japon – pre-production recording (#12), recording (#11)
- Kei Kusama – arrangement, programming, recording (#6)
- Takamitsu Kuwano – assistant recording (#14)
- Jesse McFaddin – production (#6)
- Tomoe Nishikawa – pre-production recording (#1, #9)
- OQD – pre-production recording (#3, #11, #14), recording (#1–#4, #6–#10, #12–#14)
- Colin Suzuki – recording (#6)
- Uta – production (#1, #3–#4, #7, #9, #15)
- Mats Valentin – mixing, production, programming (#10)

== Charts ==
Chart performance for Viva Ai
| Chart (2009) | Peak position |
|---|---|
| Japan Oricon weekly albums | 10 |
| Taiwan G-Music J-Pop Chart | 16 |

== Sales and certifications ==
| Chart | Amount |
|---|---|
| Oricon physical sales | 37,000 |

== Release history ==
Release history and formats for Viva Ai
| Region | Date | Format(s) | Label | Ref. |
|---|---|---|---|---|
| Japan | March 4, 2009 | CD; digital download; streaming | Island; Universal Sigma | |
| Taiwan | March 13, 2009 | CD; digital download; streaming | Universal Taiwan | |
| Various | December 5, 2012 | CD; digital download; streaming | USM Japan | |
