= Broken Strings (song) =

Single by James Morrison featuring Nelly Furtado

from the album Songs for You, Truths for Me
- B-side: "Say It All Over Again"
- Released: 8 December 2008
- Recorded: 2008
- Studio: Metrophonic Studios (London, England); State of the Ark Studios (London, England); Iguana Recording (Toronto, ON)
- Genre: Pop rock
- Length: 4:14
- Label: Polydor
- Songwriters: Nina Woodford; James Morrison; Fraser T Smith
- Producer: Mark Taylor

James Morrison singles chronology
"You Make It Real" (2008)	"Broken Strings" (2008)	"Please Don't Stop the Rain" (2009)

Nelly Furtado singles chronology
"Win or Lose" (2008)	"Broken Strings" (2008)	"Manos al Aire" (2009)

Ai singles chronology
"Okuribito" / "So Special" (2008)	"Broken Strings" (2008)	"You Are My Star" (2009)

Music video
- "Broken Strings" on YouTube

"Broken Strings" is the second single by British musician James Morrison from his second studio album, Songs for You, Truths for Me (2008), and was released in December 2008. The song is a duet with Canadian singer-songwriter Nelly Furtado. The single became Morrison's most successful single to date, peaking at number two on the UK singles chart in January 2009, as well as in the top ten on many other European charts while topping the charts in Germany and Switzerland. It was featured in episode 16 of the second season of the American television drama The Vampire Diaries.

When the album was released in Japan in March 2009, "Broken Strings" was re-recorded as a duet with R&B singer Ai replacing Furtado, as a bonus track. A remix of the song, "Broken Strings (Kocky and Trash Remix)," was featured on Ai's album Viva Ai (2009).

== Reception ==
The song received generally positive reviews from critics. According to Michael Menachem from Billboard,

Broken Strings offers two of the most vulnerable performances yet from each artist, venting an obvious metaphor for the struggles at the close of a relationship beyond repair. Their voices are richly expressive, harmonizing in an aural marriage as the midtempo ballad quietly builds to an intense climax as they belt: "Oh the truth hurts and lies worse/How can I give anymore when I love you a little less than before?" Producer extraordinaire Mark Taylor energizes "Broken Strings" with just enough accompaniment to showcase the paralyzing performances. Morrison is a staple hitmaker overseas, but in the US, phenomenal singles like "You Give Me Something" and "Wonderful World" were snubbed. Furtado's visibility has already vaulted the song to most-added status at adult top 40. At last, Morrison gets his due.

Girls Aloud performed a cover of the song at their Out of Control Tour in 2009, and JLS performed a cover of the song in their ITV Christmas special in 2010, later appearing as the B-Side to their single "Eyes Wide Shut".

== Chart performance ==
"Broken Strings" was released as the second single from Songs for You, Truths for Me. The track was released in November 2008. It entered the UK singles chart at number seventy-three and slowly rose for four weeks before, following a performance of the song with Girls Aloud on The Girls Aloud Party, broke into the top ten at number six, giving Morrison his fourth top ten hit. The following week the song rose to a new high, rising to number four on the 2008 Christmas chart. This makes "Broken Strings" Morrison's most successful single by peak position to date in the UK as, on 11 January 2009 it climbed to number two, but was eventually kept from the #1 spot by Lady Gaga's major hit "Just Dance". It ended up selling 850,000 copies in the UK. In the week ending 30 January, it reached #1 in Germany marking his first #1 in the country and Nelly Furtado's second. On the issue date 21 February 2009 the song reached number 1 on the European Hot 100 becoming his first number one single on that chart and Furtado's third. In Canada it debuted at #95 on the Canadian Hot 100 and rose to number #41.

In Japan, the version sung with Ai was released to airplay in March 2009, reaching number 19 on the Billboard Japan Hot 100.

== Music video ==
A music video in support of "Broken Strings" made its world premiere on 17 November 2008. Directed by Micah Meisner, the video features James Morrison performing the track, with Nelly Furtado also making an appearance. Parts of the video are inspired by the film Paris, Texas, while scenes where reversed explosions occur are inspired by the film Insignificance. Furtado and Morrison filmed their parts on different days. In the video, Morrison is in a hotel room and Furtado is behind a glass window of an adjacent room. Morrison starts to sing the song and when Furtado starts to sing her part behind the glass window, things begin to break, such as Morrison's guitar, the hotel room's television and more. When the video is ending, everything that is broken goes back to normal and Furtado disappears.

== Formats and track listings ==
CD single

1. "Broken Strings" (featuring Nelly Furtado)
2. "Say It All Over Again"

Maxi-CD single

1. "Broken Strings" (featuring Nelly Furtado)
2. "Say It All Over Again"
3. "Broken Strings" (Live at Air Studios)
4. "You Make It Real" (Live at Air Studios)
5. "Broken Strings" (Video)

Promo CD single

1. "Broken Strings" (Remix) (featuring Nelly Furtado)
2. "Broken Strings" (featuring Nelly Furtado)

Japan CD single

1. "Broken Strings" (featuring Ai)

== Charts ==
=== Weekly charts ===
Weekly chart performance for "Broken Strings"
Chart (2008–2009)	Peak position
Australia (ARIA)	80
Austria (Ö3 Austria Top 40)	2
Belgium (Ultratop 50 Flanders)	12
Belgium (Ultratop 50 Wallonia)	1
Canada Hot 100 (Billboard)	41
Canada AC (Billboard)	21
Canada Hot AC (Billboard)	25
Czech Republic Airplay (ČNS IFPI)	4
Denmark (Tracklisten)	4
Europe (European Hot 100 Singles)	1
France (SNEP)	6
Germany (GfK)	1
Greece Digital Song Sales (Billboard)	10
Hungary (Editors' Choice Top 40)	6
Ireland (IRMA)	2
Israel (Media Forest)	2
Italy (FIMI)	4
Japan (Japan Hot 100) featuring Ai	19
Mexico (Billboard Ingles Airplay)	10
Netherlands (Dutch Top 40)	5
Netherlands (Single Top 100)	7
New Zealand (Recorded Music NZ)	10
Norway (VG-lista)	14
Poland (Nielsen Music Control)	5
Portugal Digital Song Sales (Billboard)	3
Scottish Singles Sales (Official Charts)	9
Slovakia Airplay (ČNS IFPI)	2
Spain (Promusicae)	11
Sweden (Sverigetopplistan)	5
Switzerland (Schweizer Hitparade)	1
UK Singles (Official Charts)	2
US Adult Pop Airplay (Billboard)	34

2025 chart performance for "Broken Strings"
Chart (2025)	Peak position
Israel International Airplay (Media Forest)	15

=== Year-end charts ===
2008 year-end chart performance for "Broken Strings"
Chart (2008)	Position
UK Singles (OCC)	96

2009 year-end chart performance for "Broken Strings"
Chart (2009)	Position
Austria (Ö3 Austria Top 40)	34
Belgium (Ultratop Flanders)	49
Belgium (Ultratop Wallonia)	15
Denmark (Tracklisten)	35
Europe (European Hot 100 Singles)	9
France (SNEP)	25
Germany (Media Control GfK)	12
Italy (FIMI)	11
Netherlands (Dutch Top 40)	11
Netherlands (Single Top 100)	43
Spain (PROMUSICAE)	42
Sweden (Sverigetopplistan)	70
Switzerland (Schweizer Hitparade)	5
UK Singles (OCC)	19

=== Decade-end charts ===
Decade-end chart performance for "Broken Strings"
Chart (2000–2009)	Position
Germany (Official German Charts)	91
UK Singles (OCC)	63

== Certifications ==
Certifications for "Broken Strings"
Region	Certification	Certified units/sales
Brazil (Pro-Música Brasil)	Gold	30,000^{‡}
Denmark (IFPI Danmark)	Platinum	90,000^{‡}
Germany (BVMI)	Platinum	300,000^{‡}
Italy (FIMI)	Gold	25,000^{‡}
New Zealand (RMNZ)	2× Platinum	60,000^{‡}
Spain (Promusicae)	Gold	10,000^{*}
Switzerland (IFPI Switzerland)	Gold	15,000^{^}
United Kingdom (BPI)	3× Platinum	1,800,000^{‡}
^{*} Sales figures based on certification alone.^{^} Shipments figures based on certification alone.^{‡} Sales+streaming figures based on certification alone.
