= Fake (Ai song) =

- Standard cover (Note: On the limited edition cover, the glasses are hot pink instead of red.)

Single by Ai featuring Namie Amuro

from the album The Last Ai
- B-side: "Family"
- Released: March 31, 2010
- Genre: Pop; R&B
- Length: 4:18
- Label: Island; Universal Sigma
- Songwriters: Ai Uemura; George Tashiro
- Producer: Uta

Ai singles chronology
"You Are My Star" (2009)	"Fake" (2010)	"Still..." (2010)

Namie Amuro singles chronology
"Wild/Dr." (2009)	"Fake" (2010)	"Break It/Get Myself Back" (2010)

Music video
- "Fake" on YouTube

"Fake" (stylized in caps) is a song recorded by Japanese-American singer-songwriter Ai. It was released on March 31, 2010, by Island Records and Universal Sigma. The song served as the lead single for Ai's eighth studio album, The Last Ai.

== Background ==
"Fake feat. Namie Amuro"
A sample of the chorus of "Fake."

This single is the first of Ai's to be released since her greatest hits collection, Best Ai, in the third term 2009. It is one of many releases intended to celebrate Ai's 10th anniversary since her debut, with many further collaborations planned.

Ai and Amuro have worked together twice in the past. Once in 2003 as part of the Suite Chic project on the song "Uh Uh......", and once again in 2006 on Zeebra's song "Do What U Gotta Do" with Namie Amuro & Mummy-D.

== Reception ==
Before the release of the physical single, the track had been downloaded 30,000 times as a cellphone full-length download, and the music video viewed over 50,000 times on YouTube. In May 2010, the RIAJ certified the song as Gold, selling over 100,000 downloads.

== Track listing ==
"Fake" track listing
No.	Title	Writer(s)	Producer(s)	Length
1.	"Fake" (featuring Namie Amuro)	Ai Carina Uemura; George Tashiro	Uta	4:18
2.	"Family"	Uta; Jeff Miyahara; Jeremy Soule	Miyahara	4:00
Total length:				8:12

"Fake" – Limited edition
No.	Title	Length
3.	"Fake" (Bachlogic Remix)	3:40
4.	"Fake" (feat. Namie Amuro) (Kocky & Trash remix)	4:18
Total length:		16:16

== Charts ==
Chart	Peak position
Adult Contemporary Airplay (Billboard Japan)	4
RIAJ Digital Track Chart Top 100	4
Japan Hot 100 (Billboard Japan)	5
Japan Singles Chart (Oricon)	8

== Certifications ==
Certifications and sales for "Fake"
Region	Certification	Certified units/sales
Japan (RIAJ) Digital	Gold	100,000^{*}
^{*} Sales figures based on certification alone.
