= Itsuka Kitto... =

2011 single by Atsushi

- "Rising Sun" / "Itsuka Kitto..." CD Only cover artwork

Single by Exile Atsushi

from the album Solo
- Released: September 14, 2011
- Length: 4:13
- Label: Rhythm Zone
- Songwriters: Atsushi, Matthew Tishler, Andrew Ang
- Producer: Matthew Tishler

Exile Atsushi singles chronology
"Itsuka Kitto..." (2011)	"Ooo Baby" (2011)

"Itsuka Kitto..." (いつかきっと…) is the debut single by Atsushi, the lead singer of the J-pop group EXILE. It was released on September 14, 2011 as a "double A-side" along with Exile's 36th single called Rising Sun / Itsuka Kitto... (Rising Sun / いつかきっと…). The single debuted at #1 on the RIAJ's Digital Tracks Chart and #1 on the Oricon Charts with first-week physical sales of 234,846. "Itsuka Kitto" has also gained popularity as the theme song for the TV Asahi drama, “Hi wa Mata Noboru“. The song was written by Atsushi Sato, Matthew Tishler and Andrew Ang.

"Itsuka Kitto..." has since become the #14 highest-selling single in Japan for 2011, with 305,001 physical sales. It was included on the Exile/Exile Atsushi album Exile Japan/Solo released on January 1, 2012.

A remixed version was made as the theme for the Japanese release of Captain America: Civil War

== Rising Sun ==
"Rising Sun"

Single by EXILE

from the album EXILE Japan
- Released: September 14, 2011
- Genre: Dance-pop
- Length: 4:58
- Label: Rhythm Zone
- Songwriter: Atsushi
- Producers: Johan Becker, Didrik Thott, Sebastian Thott, Sharon Vaughn

EXILE singles chronology
"Each Other's Way (Tabi no Tochuu)" (2011)	"Rising Sun" (2011)	"Anata e" (2011)

"Rising Sun" is a song recorded by Japanese group EXILE. The song was the official charity anthem after the tsunami disaster. It was released in September 2011 along with Atsushi's debut single "Itsuka Kitto..." The song was written by Didrik Thott, Sebastian Thott, Johan Becker, Sharon Vaughn and EXILE ATSUSHI.
