= Atsushi (musician) =

Japanese singer-songwriter (born 1980)

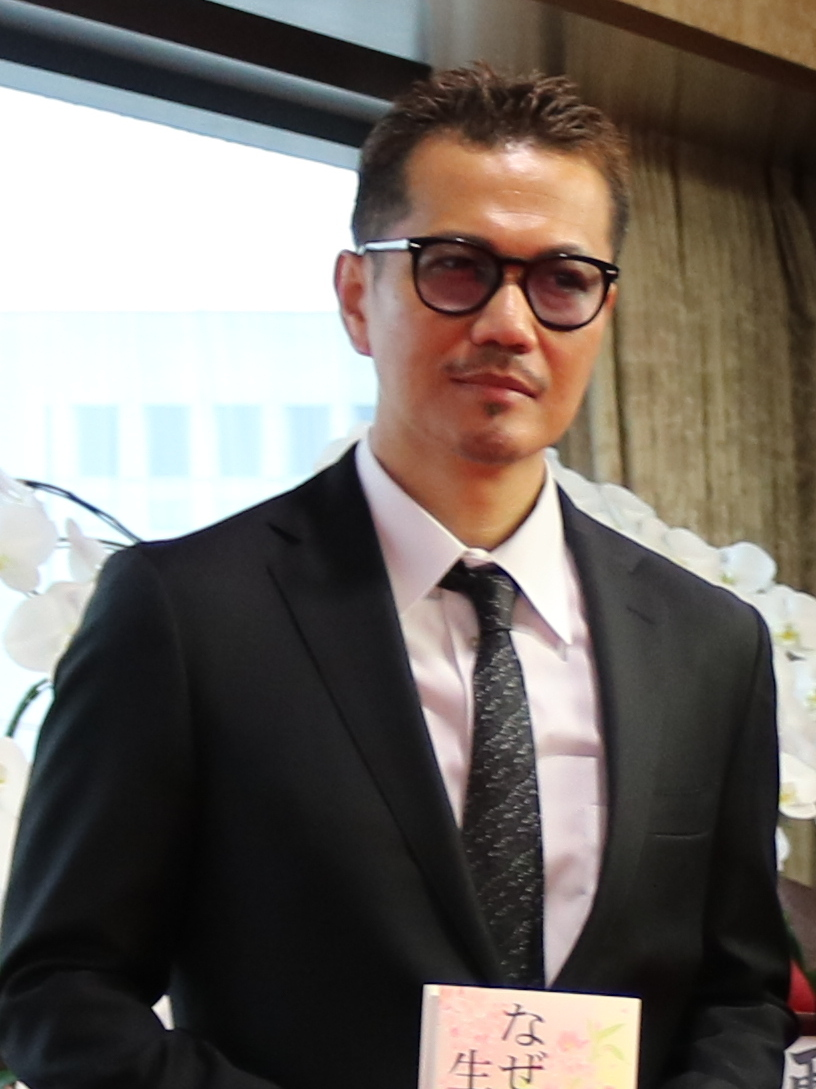
- Atsushi in 2020

Background information
- Born: Atsushi Satō; April 30, 1980 (age 46); Koshigaya, Saitama, Japan
- Origin: Japan
- Genres: Pop, R&B, jazz, crossover
- Occupations: Singer, songwriter
- Instruments: Vocals, piano, guitar
- Years active: 2001–present
- Label: Rhythm Zone
- Member of: Exile
- Website: @exile_atsushi_official

Atsushi Satō (Japanese: 佐藤 篤志, Hepburn: Satō Atsushi; born April 30, 1980), known as Atsushi or Exile Atsushi (stylized as ATSUSHI and EXILE ATSUSHI) is a Japanese singer-songwriter. Debuting as a member of the J-pop group EXILE in 2001, Atsushi is one of the main vocalists for the group. In 2004, Atsushi began working as a producer for the group Deep (then known as Color), and in 2011 released his debut solo single "Itsuka Kitto...". In 2016, he announced his temporary hiatus from EXILE and formed a new band named Red Diamond Dogs. Atsushi returned to EXILE in 2018 and later graduated from the group in December 2020 to focus on his solo activities. Atsushi rejoined the Exile Power of Wish tour on a limited basis in 2022 and announced that he would officially return to Exile's activities on the last day of the tour, 21 December 2022.

== Biography ==
Atsushi was born in Saitama on April 30, 1980. He first started playing the piano at four years of age, and at high school after joining a band decided he would rather become a vocalist. After high school, Atsushi attended the ESP Musical Academy in Tokyo to further train himself as a vocalist.

In 2000, Atsushi entered the Asayan televised talent search, making it through to the last five. In 2001, after seeing Atsushi on Asayan, Hiro of the 1990s band Zoo asked him to join a musical group he was producing, called J Soul Brothers. The group had been releasing music since 1999, however when Atsushi and vocalist Shunsuke Kiyokiba were added to the group and the group's original vocalist Sasa decided to leave the group, Hiro renamed the group Exile.

In September 2001, Exile re-debuted with the single "Your Eyes Only (Aimai na Boku no Katachi)". Used as the theme song of the Yutaka Takenouchi and Ryōko Hirosue drama Dekichatta Kekkon, the song was a commercial success, managing to be certified gold by the Recording Industry Association of Japan. In 2002, Exile released their debut album Our Style. The album featured the first song Atsushi wrote lyrics to, "Eyes in Maze", and the first song that featured him as a solo vocalist, "Konna ni mo Nagai Kimi no Fuzai" (こんなにもながい君の不在; "You've Been Away for So Long"). The theme song for the Japanese release of Captain America: Civil War is a re-recorded version of "Itsuka Kitto" by him.

Through the early 2000s, Exile continued to release hit singles, including "Choo Choo Train" (2003), a cover of the Zoo song of the same name, "Scream" (2005), a collaboration with rock band Glay and "Tada...Aitakute" (2005), a song certified million for ringtone downloads. In 2004, Atsushi began producing the vocal group Deep, and also served as one of the band's members.

In 2008, Atsushi collaborated with R&B singer Ai to release the song "So Special", found on Exile's compilation album Exile Entertainment Best (2008) and her seventh album Viva Ai (2009). In 2009, Atsushi left Deep as a full-time member, renaming the group to Color and serving solely as a producer. In September 2009, Atsushi held his first live as a solo artist, Exh Special Exile Atsushi Live Solo. This was released on DVD in March 2010, and was his first release as a solo artist.

In 2011, Atsushi released his debut single as a soloist, "Itsuka Kitto...". The song was used as the theme song for the drama Hi wa Mata Noboru, and was packaged as a split single with Exile's "Rising Sun". On January 1, 2012, Atsushi released his debut solo album Solo, packaged as a split/double album with Exile's ninth studio album Exile Japan.

In 2016, he formed a new band called Red Diamond Dogs to accompany him for his solo live tour. On July 26, Atsushi sang the Japanese national anthem at a Los Angeles Dodgers baseball game. On August 31, he announced that he will temporarily move his activities outside of Japan and will focus more on improving his craft during 2017 and that he will come back to the country in 2018. Until then, his work as part of EXILE was limited. He returned to EXILE in early 2018, for which they released six new singles and an eleventh studio album Star of Wish.

Many of Exile's hit songs have been written by Atsushi, including "Everything" (2006), "Someday" (2009), "Aisubeki Mirai e" (2009), "Yasashii Hikari" (2009), "Motto Tsuyoku" (2010), "Rising Sun" (2011), "Exile Pride (Konna Sekai o Ai Suru Tame)" (2013), "Jōnetsu no Hana" (2015), "Joy-ride (Kankino Drive)" (2016), "Reason" (2023), and "Get-go!" (2025).

On November 2, 2020, he announced his graduation from EXILE to focus on his solo career. This decision came about in part due to the COVID-19 pandemic. The fact that he turned 40 also made him re-evaluate his life. ATSUSHI then released a book, “Sign Break Away from the past. Reincarnate, Stick to One's Beliefs.”, on November 12. In the book, he discusses his thought process in leaving EXILE right before the group's 20th anniversary the following year. "Sunshine", which was initially his last single with EXILE, was released on December 16. Despite this, Atsushi provided vocals on EXILE's 2022 song "Power of Wish". In December 2022, Atsushi changed his mind and announced his return to EXILE full time, cancelling his previously-announced departure.

== Image ==
Atsushi is known for wearing sunglasses as a trademark of his image, which he began to do after reacting badly to the bright lights on television sets. He is also known for his buzz cut-style hair style, a style he has kept since 2003.

== Personal life ==
Atsushi is a huge fan of American R&B trio Boyz II Men. In addition to his native Japanese, Atsushi is fluent in English and can also speak Chinese.

== Artistry ==
=== Repertoire ===
Atsushi's repertoire contains elements of R&B, jazz, and even crossover music. For example, his 2016 dome trek Exile Atsushi Live Tour 2016: It's Showtime! is jazz-themed, as is the tour's theme song "Beautiful Gorgeous Love".

== Discography ==
=== Studio albums ===
List of albums, with selected chart positions
Title	Album details	Peak positions			Certifications
Title	Album details	JPN	TWN	TWN East Asian (Note: Positions were sourced as follows: "Itsuka Kitto" 2011 week 38, Exile Japan/Solo 2012 week 1, "Soredemo, Ikite Yuku" 2013 week 18, "Michishirube" 2013 week 40, "Sange" 2013 week 43, Music 2014 week 15, Love Ballade 2015 week 1.)	Certifications
Solo (Note: Solo was released as a split album alongside Exile's ninth studio album Exile Japan.)	Released: January 1, 2012 (JPN); Label: Rhythm Zone; Formats: 2CD, 2CD/2DVD, 2CD/4DVD, digital download	1	17	2	RIAJ: 3× Platinum
Music	Released: March 12, 2014 (JPN); Label: Rhythm Zone; Formats: CD, 2CD/2DVD, 2CD/2Blu-ray, digital download	2	—	10	RIAJ: Platinum
40 ～forty～	Released: November 4, 2020 (JPN); Label: Rhythm Zone; Formats: CD, CD/DVD, 2CD/4DVD, CD/Blu-ray, 2CD/4Blu-ray, digital download	4	—	—	
One	Released: April 30, 2022; Label: Rhythm Zone; Formats: CD, CD/DVD, digital download	4	—	—	

=== Mini-albums ===
List of albums, with selected chart positions
Title	Album details	Peak positions		Certifications
Title	Album details	JPN	TWN East Asian	Certifications
Compassion -EP-	Produced by ATSUSHI; Released: November 26, 2011 (JPN) (Note: Exclusive at "Exile Live Tour 2011 Tower of Wish".); Re-released: September 2, 2020 (JPN) (Note: Digital release.); Label: Rhythm Zone; Formats: CD, digital download	—	—	

=== Compilation albums ===
List of albums, with selected chart positions
Title	Album details	Peak positions		Certifications
Title	Album details	JPN	TWN East Asian	Certifications
Love Ballade	Released: December 3, 2014 (JPN); Label: Rhythm Zone; Formats: CD, CD/DVD, CD/Blu-ray, digital download	1	1	RIAJ: Gold
Traditional Best	Released: April 30, 2019 (JPN); Label: Rhythm Zone; Formats: CD, CD/DVD, CD/Blu-ray, digital download	6	—	

=== Singles ===
==== As a lead artist ====
List of singles, with selected chart positions
Title	Year	Peak chart positions			Certifications	Album
Title	Year	Oricon Singles Charts	Billboard Japan Hot 100 (Note: Sources for chart positions are as follows: "So Special (Version Ai)", "I'm Lovin' You", "Itsuka Kitto...", "Golden Smile", "All You Need Is Love", "Alive", "Melrose (Aisanai Yakusoku)", "Soredemo, Ikite Yuku", "Michishirube", "Sange", "Aoi Ryū", "Hane 1/2", "Make a Miracle", "Precious Love", "Sakura no Kisetsu", "Be Brave", "No More".)	TWN East Asian	Certifications	Album
"So Special" (Note: Two versions of "So Special" have been released with both Ai and Atsushi as primary artists. "Version Ai" features a different melody, structure and lyrics than "Version Exile".) (with Ai)	2008	15	14	—		Viva Ai
"I'm Lovin' You" (with Iconiq)	2009	—	47	—		Change Myself
"Itsuka Kitto..." (いつかきっと...; "Surely Someday") (Note: Released as a split single with Exile's "Rising Sun".)	2011	1	12	6	RIAJ (digital): Platinum	Solo
"Ooo Baby" (Note: Released as a split single with Exile's "Anata e".)	2011	2	—	—		Solo
"Furusato" (ふるさと; "Home Town") (Note: Digital single; cover of the children's song from 1915.)	2012	—	—	—		Music
"Melrose (Aisanai Yakusoku)" (愛さない約束; "Promise Not to Love")	2012	2	2	—	RIAJ (physical): Gold	Music
"Soredemo, Ikite Yuku" (それでも、生きてゆく; "Even So, I'll Still Live On") (with Nobuyuki Tsujii)	2013	3	5	7		Music
"Michishirube" (道しるべ; "Sign Post")	2013	7	17	13		Music
"Sange" (懺悔; "Confession") (with Joe Hisaishi)	2013	8	25	10		Music
"Aoi Ryū" (青い龍; "Blue Dragon")	2014	3	5	—		Music
"Precious Love" (Note: Digital single.)	2014	—	6	—	RIAJ (digital): Gold	Love Ballade
"Sakura no Kisetsu" (桜の季節; "Cherry Blossom Season")	2015	3	25	—		Love Ballade
"Be Brave" (with Ai)	2015	7	12	—		40 ~forty~
"No More" (with Ai)	2016	7	4	—		40 ~forty~
"Beautiful Gorgeous Love" (Note: Released as a split single with Red Diamond Dogs' "First Liners".)	2016	2	4	—		40 ~forty~
"Just the Way You Are" (Note: Cover of Bruno Mars song; covered primarily in Japanese.)	2018	6	8	—		40 ~forty~
"Suddenly" (Note: Released as a split single with Red Diamond Dogs' "Red Soul Blue Dragon".)	2018	4	16	—		40 ~forty~
"With You (Luv Merry X'mas)" (Note: Digital single; cover of LUVandSOUL song.)	2018	—	—	—		40 ~forty~
"Bounce on It" (Note: Digital single.)	2019	—	—	—		40 ~forty~
"Won't Be Long -2019-" (Note: Digital single.) (with Koda Kumi and EXILE MAKIDAI (PKCZ(R)))	2019	—	—	—		40 ~forty~
""OSAKA TOKYO" (オーサカトーキョー; "Osaka Tokyo") (Note: Digital single.) (with Koda Kumi)	2020	—	—	—		40 ~forty~
"KAZE" (Note: Digital single.)	2021	—	—	—		One
"Amazing Grace" (Note: Digital single. Cover of Christian hymn.)	2021	—	—	—		One
"Heart to Heart" (Note: Digital single.)	2021	—	—	—		One
"Night Flight" (Note: Digital single.)	2021	—	—	—		One
""I always love you ～Itsumosobani～" (I always love you ～いつもそばに～; "I always love you ～Always by my side～") (Note: Digital single.)	2021	—	—	—		One
"You Raise Me Up" (Note: Cover of the Secret Garden song; covered primarily in Japanese.)	2022	—	—	—		One
"You Own My Heart"	2022	—	—	—		TBA
"Netto Koshien" (フォトグラフ; "Photograph") (Note: Digital single.)	2023	—	—	—		TBA
"Love Thang" (Note: Released as a split single with Color's "It's Brand New".)	2025	—	—	—		TBA
"Heart to Heart Part 2" (Note: Digital single.)	2026	—	—	—		TBA
"—" denotes items that did not chart.

==== As a featured artist ====
List of singles, with selected chart positions
Title	Year	Peak chart positions		Certifications	Album
Title	Year	Oricon Singles Charts	Billboard Japan Hot 100	Certifications	Album
"Golden Smile" (Toshinobu Kubota featuring Exile Atsushi)	2011	—	49	RIAJ (digital): Gold	Gold Skool
"All You Need Is Love" (among Japan United with Music)	2012	11	11		Non-album single
"Alive" (M-Flo+Exile Atsushi)	2012	—	81		Square One
"Hane 1/2" (羽1/2; "Wing Half") (Shunsuke Kiyokiba & Exile Atsushi)	2014	—	24		Utaiya Best Vol. 1
"Summer Won't Be Back" (Mabu feat. Exile Atsushi)	2017	—	—		Brightest Dope

==== Promotional singles ====
List of promotional singles with selected chart positions
Title	Year	Peak chart positions	Certifications	Album
Title	Year	Billboard Japan Hot 100	Certifications	Album
"So Special (Version Ex)" (Exile Atsushi+Ai)	2008	—	RIAJ (digital): Gold	Exile Entertainment Best
"Make a Miracle"	2014	72		Music

=== Video albums ===
List of media, with selected chart positions
Title	Album details	Peak positions		Certifications
Title	Album details	JPN DVD	JPN Blu-ray	Certifications
EXH Special Exile Atsushi Premium Live Solo	Released: March 24, 2010 (JPN); Label: Rhythm Zone; Formats: DVD	1	—	RIAJ: Gold
Exile Atsushi Premium Live: The Roots	Released: May 11, 2011 (JPN); Label: Rhythm Zone; Formats: DVD	1	—	RIAJ: Gold
Exile Atsushi Premium Live: Inochi o Utau (命をうたう; "Singing Life")	Released: April 3, 2013 (JPN); Label: Rhythm Zone; Formats: DVD	1	—	
Exile Atsushi Live Tour 2014: Music	Released: October 29, 2014 (JPN); Label: Rhythm Zone; Formats: DVD, Blu-ray	1	3	RIAJ: Gold
Exile Atsushi Live Tour 2016: "It's Showtime ! !"	Released: February 15, 2017 (JPN); Label: Rhythm Zone; Formats: DVD, Blu-ray	1	1	
Exile Atsushi Special Night"	In collabotion with RED DIAMOND DOGS; Released: April 8, 2020 (JPN); Label: Rhythm Zone; Formats: DVD, Blu-ray	3	8	

== Works ==
=== Books ===
Year	Title	ISBN
2013	Plush Sound.	ISBN 978-4344023697
2014	SWITCH INTERVIEW - Tachi Hitotachi	ISBN 978-4835618746
2020	Sign Break Away from the past. Reincarnate, Stick to One's Beliefs.	ISBN 978-4344037052
