= Don't Stop Ai =

2007 album by Ai

- Standard cover

Studio album by Ai
- Released: December 5, 2007
- Recorded: 2006–2007
- Studio: Prime Sound Studio Form (Meguro, Tokyo); TamStar Studio (Shibuya, Tokyo); Real & Beats Studio (Tokyo); Peninsula Studio (Tokyo); Crescente Studio (Setagaya, Tokyo); Tomita Lab Studio (Tokyo); Jayjay Productions Studio (New York City); Murlyn Studios (Stockholm); 2face (Tokyo)
- Genre: R&B; hip hop; pop; pop rock
- Length: 55:04
- Language: Japanese; English
- Label: Island; Universal Sigma
- Producer: T. Kura; The Company; Toshiaki Matsumoto; Jonas Jeberg; Ty Fyffe; Bach Logic

Ai chronology
| Live Ai (2007) | Don't Stop Ai (2007) | Viva Ai (2009) |

Singles from Don't Stop Ai
- 1. "I'll Remember You" / "Brand New Day" Released: July 18, 2007; 2. "One" Released: November 7, 2007; 3. "Taisetsu na Mono" Released: June 4, 2008

Don't Stop Ai (stylized as DON'T STOP A.I.) is the sixth studio album by Japanese-American singer-songwriter Ai, released on December 5, 2007, by Island Records and Universal Sigma. It featured two successful singles, the mid-tempo R&B song "I'll Remember You" and the ballad "Taisetsu na Mono," both of which were certified gold by the Recording Industry Association of Japan.

The album is the first of Ai's on which she extensively collaborated with Japanese musicians, and her first on which she worked closely with Scandinavian producers.

== Background and development ==
The final concert for Ai's tour of her previous album, What's Goin' On Ai, was held at the Nippon Budokan stadium, which was the first time Ai performed at the venue. The Budokan recording was released as Ai's first live album, Live Ai, in March 2007. In 2007, Ai performed at several Japanese summer rock festivals, including FM802 Meet the World Beat, Rock in Japan Festival, Voices of Heart II, AP Bank Fes and Monster Bash.

Ai released three singles before the release of the album, beginning with the double A-side single "I'll Remember You" and "Brand New Day" in July ("Brand New Day" was originally released digitally in June 2007). "I'll Remember You" fared well, becoming certified gold twice by the RIAJ.

A month prior to the album's release, "One" was released as the theme song for the second series of the drama Team Medical Dragon. Ai's 2006 single "Believe" was used as the first season's theme song, and was extremely successful. However, "One" did not mirror "Believe"'s success.

== Writing and production ==
"Brand New Day"
The first digital single released from the album was an upbeat pop-R&B tune.

"I'll Remember You"
The midtempo track "I'll Remember You" was produced by Danish producer Jonas Jeberg.

"Taisetsu na Mono"
Released six months after the album, "Taisetsu na Mono" was a digital hit, being certified gold by the RIAJ.

Ai started making the album after she finished her What's Goin' On Ai tour in December 2006. Because she had just finished touring, Ai felt the strong energy from performing live, and was more conscious as to which songs would sound good performed live, compared to when creating her previous albums. Ai chose "Brand New Day" as the first song to be released from the album (a song she thought was "fun" and "non-serious"), to contrast the serious message songs on her previous album, What's Goin' On Ai (2006).

The album features an almost completely new set of producers. The one exception is T. Kura, who worked on the songs "Don't Stop" and "It's Show Time!!!." Ai worked with Japanese composer The Company on three songs, "Butterfly," "The Answer" and the single "Taisetsu na Mono." The team who worked together on the drama single "One," arranger Keiichi Tomita and composer Toshiaki Matsumoto, were the same pair who created R&B singer Misia's 2000 hit ballad "Everything." One other Japanese producer worked on the album, Bach Logic, who produced the original version of "Get Up."

For the first time, Ai worked with European songwriters. Danish producer Jonas Jeberg wrote and produced both songs on the album's first single, "I'll Remember You/Brand New Day," while Swedish producers Fredrik "Fredro" Ödesjö and Mats Berntoft produced "Feel So Good." Ai also collaborated with three American R&B/hip-hop producers: Ty Fyffe on "Ima," Troy Taylor on "My Sweet Home" and Darryl "Da Rulah" Farmer on "Move."

The album was primarily recorded at Prime Sound Studio Form and TamStar Studio Tokyo, with additional recording at Real & Beats Studio, Peninsula Studio, Crescente Studio and Tomita Lab Studio, all in Tokyo. Several songs' instrumentals were recorded overseas, at Jayjay Productions Studio, New York City and Murlyn Studios, Stockholm.

Unlike her previous studio album, What's Goin' On Ai (2006), where Ai had collaborated with four overseas musicians, she now collaborated with five Japanese musicians. On the song "Butterfly," Ai worked with three other female vocalists, rapper Anty the Kunoichi, rock musician Anna Tsuchiya and reggae artist Pushim. This was the first time Ai worked with any of these musicians. Ai was friends with all three musicians, having first met Anty the Kunoichi when she performed at a club in Nagoya, and having first met Tsuchiya on the set of the 2006 film Memories of Matsuko, where both artists had made cameo appearances. Ai was later featured on Tsuchiya's single "Crazy World" the next year. On the song "Get Up," Ai collaborated with half-brother hip-hop MCs Sphere of Influence and Zeebra. Ai had collaborated with Sphere of Influence in 2002 on his single "Luv Ya," and with Zeebra twice before ("Golden Mic (Remix)" in 2003 and "Do What U Gotta Do" in 2006).

"Don't Stop" samples the melody of the song "Hush" written by Joe South, originally performed by Billy Joe Royal, made famous by Deep Purple in the 1960s. "Brand New Day" is a track based on the same music as American High School Musical singer Corbin Bleu's song "Marchin'" from his debut album Another Side. The song was released on Bleu's album one month before Ai's full length digital release of "Brand New Day," but one month after the ringtone release of Ai's version. The song "The Answer" was originally made for Team Medical Dragon's season two theme song, however the drama producers were looking for a "peaceful" song for the theme song instead. "One" was created by Ai after hearing the creators' decision. In "I Remember You," Ai tried to write lyrics to remember the people who encouraged her to become a singer. She did not write the song with love in mind.

== Promotion and concerts ==
The four singles released from the album all received major tie-ups. "Brand New Day" was the Japan Airlines JAL+One World television commercial song, and "I'll Remember You" was used in headphone company Audio-Technica's 2007 campaign. The song was also featured in commercials for digital download provider music.jp commercials.

"One" was the theme song to the second season of Team Medical Dragon, for which Ai's "Believe" (2006) served as the theme song in the initial series. "Taisetsu na Mono" was used in a 2008 campaign for Chartis Insurance, which cheered on athletes at the 2008 Beijing Summer Olympics. It also was used as the theme song for the American drama series Heroes in Japan.

Ai debuted her single "I'll Remember You" live at the 2007 MTV Video Music Awards Japan on May 26, 2007. Ai also performed at the Live Earth charity concert on July 7, 2007, performing seven songs including "I'll Remember You" and "Brand New Day." She performed a free concert outside of the Tokyo Metropolitan Government Building on December 22, 2007, as a part of the Beijing Olympics promotion campaign.

Beginning February 2008, Ai toured the album extensively across Japan, performing 32 concerts at 28 venues on her Don't Stop Ai Japan Tour 2008. The tour ended on May 27 and May 28, with two performances at the Nippon Budokan. The final concert was released to DVD on November 26, 2008.

Ai appeared on music TV shows Music Station on June 6, 2008, and Bokura no Ongaku on June 13, 2008, performing "Taisetsu na Mono."

== Critical reception ==
Professional ratings
Review scores
| Source | Rating |
|---|---|
| Listen Japan | (favorable) |
| What's In? | (favorable) |

Listen Japan's Morio Mori called the album splendid and impressive, and felt it was a signature album of Ai's. He was impressed by the collaboration track "Butterfly," calling it a "current day "Lady Marmalade.""

What's In? reviewers called "Brand New Day" an "awesome uptempo number" that brought images of marching, with the song's "tight beats and Ai's powerful vocals." They praised the single "Taisetsu na Mono," calling the vocals "warm" and the chorus work "profound." Tetsuo Hiraga of Hot Express felt that the lyrics of "One" were "deep, kind and straight forward." CDJournal reviewers described "Brand New Day" as having "funky and fat beats."

Ai won one award for the videos from the album, and was nominated twice. She won the Best Buzz Asia – Japan award at the 2008 MTV Video Music Awards Japan for "I'll Remember You," which was also nominated for the best R&B video award. "Brand New Day" was nominated for Best Female Video at the 2008 Space Shower Music Video Awards.

== Chart performance ==
The album debuted at number four in Japan with 45,000 copies sold, underneath B'z, Kazumasa Oda and Yui Aragaki. It was not as much of a long seller album as Ai's previous works, spending only two weeks in the top 20, and 12 weeks in the top 300. The album was certified gold by the RIAJ for 100,000 physical copies shipped to stores in its month of release. As of 2012, this album is Ai's fifth most successful release, and fourth most successful original album.

== Track listing ==
CD
| No. | Title | Lyrics | Music | Arranger(s) | Length |
|---|---|---|---|---|---|
| 1. | "Intro" | | T. Kura | T. Kura | 1:46 |
| 2. | "Don't Stop" | Ai, Joe South | T. Kura, Ai, J. South | | 3:46 |
| 3. | "It's Show Time!!!" | Ai | T. Kura, Ai | | 4:40 |
| 4. | "Interlude" | | The Company | The Company | 1:01 |
| 5. | "Butterfly" (featuring Anty the Kunoichi, Anna Tsuchiya, Pushim) | Ai, Anty the Kunoichi, A. Tsuchiya, Pushim | Ai, Anty the Kunoichi, A. Tsuchiya, Masanori Mine, Pushim, The Company | | 4:22 |
| 6. | "One" | Ai | Toshiaki Matsumoto | Keiichi Tomita | 5:03 |
| 7. | "I'll Remember You" | Ai, Jonas Jeberg, Anders Bagge, Sylvia Bennett-Smith, Marc Smith | J. Jeberg, Ai | | 3:57 |
| 8. | "Feel So Good" | Ai | Fredrik Odesjo, Mats Berntoft, Ai | Fredro, Mats Berntoft | 3:14 |
| 9. | "Move" | Ai | Ai | Darryl "Darulah" Farmer | 3:09 |
| 10. | "My Sweet Home" | Ai | Ai | Troy Talor | 3:31 |
| 11. | "Ima" (イマ "Now") | Ai | Ty Fyffe, Ai | Ty Fyffe | 3:57 |
| 12. | "The Answer" | Ai | The Company, Ai | | 4:07 |
| 13. | "Taisetsu na Mono" (大切なもの "Important Things") | Ai | The Company, Ai | | 5:15 |
| 14. | "Get Up (Remix)" (featuring Sphere of Influence, Zeebra) | Ai, Sphere of Influence, Zeebra | Bach Logic, Ai | | 4:08 |
| 15. | "Brand New Day" | Ai, J. Jeberg, Simon Brenting, Damon Sharp, Greg Lawson | J. Jeberg, Ai | | 3:04 |
| Total length: | | | | | 55:04 |

DVD: Music videos
| No. | Title | Director(s) | Length |
|---|---|---|---|
| 1. | "One" | Masaki Ōkita |
| 2. | "I'll Remember You" | Masashi Mutō |
| 3. | "Brand New Day" | Ugichin |
| 4. | "One (Video Making)" |
| 5. | "I'll Remember You (Video Making)" |
| 6. | "Brand New Day (Video Making)" |

== Personnel ==
Personnel details were sourced from Don't Stop Ai's liner notes booklet.

Managerial

- Yuki Arai – executive producer
- Naoshi Fujikura – executive producer
- Masahiro "Bob" Hasegawa – chorus coordination (#6)
- Kaleb James – chorus coordination (#6)
- Justin Kalifowitz – production coordination (#10)
- Mie Kato – A&R administration
- Kaz Koike – executive producer
- Hitomi Miyamoto – artwork coordination
- Kazutaka Naya – musician coordination (#6)
- Kenya "Malu.k" Orita – chief producer (#7–#8, #15)
- Koichi Sakakibara – artist management
- Hide Yasuda – A&R administration
- Yuko Yasumoto – production coordination (#10)

Performance credits

- Ai – vocals, background vocals
- Thomas Anderson – guitars (#7)
- Erik Arvinder – strings (#8)
- Anty the Kunoichi – vocals (#5)
- Mats Berntoft – instruments (#8)
- Darryl "Darylah" Farmer – instruments (#9)
- Fredro – arrangement, production, programming (#8)
- Gakushi – keyboards (#4–#5, #12–#13)
- Kaleb James – chorus vocals (#6)
- Jonas Jeberg – all instruments (#7, #15)
- Wornell Jones – chorus vocals (#6)
- Martin G. Johnson – chorus vocals (#6)
- Chieko Kinbara Strings – strings (#6)
- Maxayn Lewis – chorus vocals (#6)
- Mataro Misawa – alto flute, clarinet, flute (#6)
- Pei Shantea – electric bass (#5)
- Sphere of Influence – rap vocals (#14)
- Argie Phine – chorus vocals (#6)
- Pushim – vocals (#5)
- Melodie Sexton – chorus vocals (#6)
- R. Stone Stafford – movie trailer voice (#1)
- Keiichi Tomita – instruments (#6)
- Anna Tsuchiya – vocals (#5)
- Takuo Yamamoto – alto flute, clarinet, flute (#6)
- Zeebra – rap vocals (#14)

Visuals and imagery

- Noriko Goto – stylist
- Yasunari Kikuma – photographer
- Misato Kumamoto – art direction, design
- Akemi Ono – hair, make-up
- Junichi Shimizu – design

Technical and production

- Bach Logic – arrangement, production (both original and remix) (#14)
- Mats Berntoft – arrangement, production, programming (#8)
- Simon Brenting – drum programming (#15)
- C-murder – recording (#5)
- The Company – arrangement, production (#4–#5, #12–#13)
- Tom Coyne – mastering
- DJ Hirakatsu – scratching (#2)
- D.O.I – mixing (#2–#5, #7–#14)
- Darryl "Darylah" Farmer – arrangement, production (#9)
- Fredro – arrangement, production, programming (#8)
- Ty Fyffe – arrangement, production (#11)
- Takeshi Hirata – recording (#5)
- Jonas Jeberg – drum programming (#15), production (#7, #15)
- T. Kura – arrangement, production (#1–#3)
- Marco – mixing (#15)
- Lyuta Mazda – recording (#6)
- Y. Morita – pre-production recording (#7–#12, #15)
- OQD – recording (#2–#3, #5, #7–#15)
- Ken Sato – recording direction (#6)
- Troy Taylor – production (#10)
- Keiichi Tomita – arrangement, instrument treatment, production, mixing, recording (#6)

== Charts ==
Chart performance for Don't Stop Ai
| Chart (2007) | Peak position |
|---|---|
| Japan Oricon weekly albums | 4 |

== Sales and certifications ==
| Chart | Amount |
|---|---|
| Oricon physical sales | 108,000 |
| RIAJ physical shipping certification | Gold (100,000+) |

== Release history ==
Release history and formats for Don't Stop Ai
| Region | Date | Format(s) | Label | Ref. |
|---|---|---|---|---|
| Japan | December 5, 2007 | CD; digital download; streaming | Island; Universal Sigma | |
| Taiwan | December 7, 2007 | CD; digital download; streaming | Universal Taiwan | |
| South Korea | March 20, 2008 | CD; digital download; streaming | Universal Korea | |
| Various | December 5, 2012 | CD; digital download; streaming | USM Japan | |
