= You Are My Star =

2009 single by Ai

- Digital and limited edition cover

Single by Ai

from the album Viva Ai
- Language: Japanese; English
- B-side: "People in the World"
- Released: February 4, 2009
- Length: 4:39
- Label: Island
- Songwriters: Ai Carina Uemura; Uta
- Producer: Uta

Ai singles chronology
"Broken Strings" (2008)	"You Are My Star" (2009)	"Fake" (2010)

Music video
- "You Are My Star" on YouTube

"You Are My Star" is a song recorded by Japanese-American singer-songwriter Ai, released on February 4, 2009, by Island Records. Serving as the second single from her seventh studio album, Viva Ai, "You Are My Star" includes "People in the World", the image song for the 2009 Japanese film adaption of Lala Pipo, as a B-side.

== Background and release ==
Shortly after the release of Ai's video album Don't Stop Ai Japan Tour, Ai announced the release of a new single in December 2008. She later appeared as a featured artist on a re-recording of "Broken Strings" with British singer James Morrison.

"You Are My Star" was released on February 4, 2009, as a single. Two physical variants were released: a standard and limited edition. The limited edition of the single includes a DVD of club performances.

== Track listing ==
- CD
1. "You Are My Star" – 4:39
2. "People in the World" (movie short version) – 2:48
- CD+DVD maxi single – limited edition
1. "You Are My Star" (Club Tour live performance video)
2. "People in the World" (Club Tour live performance video)

== Credits and personnel ==
- Ai Carina Uemura – vocals, background vocals
- Uta – production
- D.O.I – mixing
- OQD – recording engineer
- Tom Coyne – mastering

== Charts ==
Chart performance for "You Are My Star"
Chart (2009)	Peak position
Japan (Japan Hot 100)	11
Japan (Oricon)	36

== Release history ==
Release history and formats for "You Are My Star"
Region	Date	Format(s)	Version	Label	Ref.
Various	February 4, 2009	Digital download; streaming	Standard	Island; Universal Sigma	
Japan	February 4, 2009	CD	Standard	Island; Universal Sigma	
Japan	February 4, 2009	CD; DVD	Limited	Island; Universal Sigma	
