= Letters from a Black Widow =

Studio album by Judith Hill
- Released: April 26, 2024
- Length: 50:58
- Label: Regime Music Group
- Producer: Judith Hill

Judith Hill chronology
Baby, I'm Hollywood! (2021)	Letters from a Black Widow (2024)

Singles from Letters from a Black Widow
- 1. "Runaway Train" Released: September 15, 2023; 2. "Flame" Released: January 23, 2024; 3. "Dame de la Lumière" Released: March 5, 2024

Letters from a Black Widow is the fifth studio album by American singer-songwriter Judith Hill. It was released on April 26, 2024, by Regime Music Group.

== Background ==
Consisting of twelve songs, the album includes the singles, "Runaway Train", "Flame", and "Dame de la Lumière". "Runaway Train" was released on September 15, 2023, as the album's lead single. The second and third singles, "Flame" and "Dame de la Lumière", were released on January 23, 2024, and March 5, 2024.

== Reception ==
Professional ratings
Review scores
Source	Rating
AllMusic	4/5 stars

AllMusic described Letters from a Black Widow as a "cathartic album, exceptional in its writing and production" and "a mature statement of an artist who knows her worth, expresses empathy, practices acceptance, and embraces possibility." BroadwayWorld noted it as a "formidable battle cry that dives into Hill's stories of discovery, resistance and redemption, patched together with her signature unshakable soul and funk foundations," calling it Hill's "most soul-bearing work to date". Guitar World remarked "And so, with Letters from a Black Widow, she’s grabbing the bull by the horns and embracing the brunt of its impact with an equally horny-edged guitar in hand." The New York Times described it as "a concept album that reckons forcefully with her past — not just the boldfaced part, but also the myriad woes and distortions that conspired to make her feel fearful and less-than."

== Track listing ==
No.	Title	Length
1.	"One of the Bad Ones"	4:10
2.	"Flame"	3:47
3.	"My Whole Life is in the Wrong Key"	3:27
4.	"We Are the Power"	4:17
5.	"Black Widow"	5:14
6.	"Touch"	4:13
7.	"Dame De La Lumière"	4:41
8.	"Let Me Be Your Mother"	3:48
9.	"You Got it Kid"	4:09
10.	"Runaway Train"	4:15
11.	"Downtown Boogie"	3:56
12.	"More Than Love"	5:01
Total length:		50:58
