= Back in Time (Judith Hill album) =

Studio album by Judith Hill
- Released: March 23, 2015
- Recorded: January–February 2015
- Studios: Paisley Park, Chanhassen, Minnesota, US
- Genres: Funk; soul; blues
- Length: 41:14
- Label: NPG
- Producers: Judith Hill, Prince

Judith Hill chronology
Back in Time (2015)	Golden Child (2018)

Singles from Back in Time
- 1. "Cry, Cry, Cry" Released: 2015

Back in Time is the debut album by American recording artist Judith Hill. Co-produced with Prince and recorded at Paisley Park, the album was released first as a free limited promotional download on March 23, 2015, and later to other streaming services. The CD was released on October 23, 2015 by NPG Records.

== Background ==
After seeing a video clip of Grammy Award winner Hill telling a European TV show that she wanted to work with Prince, the musician and producer tracked Hill down and invited her to a listening party in Los Angeles for Prince's then-new album Art Official Age. That was the first time the two musicians had met, and Prince asked Hill to send him some of her songs. He provided her with some comments and Hill was later invited to Prince's Paisley Park studio complex to jam with his band. Hill had already written some of the songs for the album, and Prince suggested some new arrangements, which worked better for a band. The songs were recorded in two or three weeks, which Prince said was "the fastest album" he had ever produced.

== Track listing ==
All tracks are written by Judith Hill, except where noted.

No.	Title	Writer(s)	Length
1.	"As Trains Go By"		4:34
2.	"Turn Up"		3:27
3.	"Angel in the Dark"	Hill, Guy Roche, Steven Diamond	4:07
4.	"Beautiful Life"		4:01
5.	"Cure"	Hill, Stefan Skarbek	2:41
6.	"Love Trip"		3:01
7.	"My People"		2:43
8.	"Wild Tonight"		4:17
9.	"Cry, Cry, Cry"	Hill, Makeba Woods, Kerry Brothers Jr., Joel Whitley	5:06
10.	"Jammin' in the Basement"	Hill, Roche, Diamond	3:33
11.	"Back in Time"		3:45

== Credits ==
- Art direction, design – Annie Madison
- Bass – Andrew Gouche, Robert Lee Hill (track 3)
- Booking – Gayle Holcomb
- Co-producer, Drum Programming – Trooko (track 3)
- Co-producer, Programmed By – Joshua Welton (tracks 3, 11)
- Drums – John Blackwell, Kirk Johnson
- Horns – NPG Hornz
- Keyboards – Dominique "Xavier" Taplin
- Management – John Welch
- Mixed By, Mastered by – Joshua Welton
- Musical assistance – Joshua Welton
- Orchestra [Arranged by] – Michael Nelson
- Photography by – Randee St. Nicholas
- Producer – Judith Hill, Prince
- Public Relations – Bobbie Gale
- Recorded by – Booker T
- Strings (arrangement) – Judith Hill (track 3)
- Vocals, Guitar, Bass, Drums – Prince
- Vocals, Piano – Judith Hill
