= Taisetsu na Mono =

2008 single by Ai

Single by Ai

from the album Don't Stop Ai
- Language: Japanese; English
- B-side: "Feel for You"; "Touch the Sky"
- Released: June 4, 2008
- Recorded: 2007–2008
- Length: 5:17
- Label: Island; Universal Sigma
- Songwriter(s): Ai Carina Uemura; The Company
- Producer(s): The Company

Ai singles chronology
"One" (2007)	"Taisetsu na Mono" (2008)	"Crazy World" (2008)

Live performance video
- "Taisetsu na Mono" on YouTube

"Taisetsu na Mono" (大切なもの, lit. 'important things') is a song recorded by Japanese-American singer-songwriter Ai, released on June 4, 2008, by Island Records and Universal Sigma. Serving as the fourth and final single for Ai's sixth studio album Don't Stop Ai, "Taisetsu na Mono" was used in a series of commercial tie-ins.

== Release and promotion ==
Ai released "Taisetsu na Mono" as a maxi single on June 4, 2008. "Feel for You" and "Touch the Sky" were included as B-sides, however were later included on Ai's seventh studio album, Viva Ai (2009). Two editions of the single were physically released; the limited edition including a bonus live performance track of "Taisetsu na Mono".

"Taisetsu na Mono" was used in a 2008 campaign for Chartis during the 2008 Beijing Summer Olympics. It also was used as the theme song for the American drama series Heroes in Japan.

== Live performances ==
Ai appeared on music TV shows Music Station on June 6, 2008, and Bokura no Ongaku on June 13, 2008, performing "Taisetsu na Mono."

== Track listing ==
- Digital download, streaming and CD
  1. "Taisetsu na Mono" – 5:17
  2. "Feel for You" – 4:27
  3. "Touch the Sky" – 4:41
  4. "Taisestu na Mono (V.I.P Remix)" – 5:06
- Limited edition CD
  1. "Taisetsu na Mono" – 5:17
  2. "Feel for You" – 4:27
  3. "Touch the Sky" – 4:41
  4. "Taisestu na Mono (V.I.P Remix)" – 5:06
  5. "Taisetsu na Mono (live performance)" – 5:30

== Charts ==
Chart performance for "Taisetsu na Mono"
Chart (2008)	Peak position
Japan (Japan Hot 100)	9
Japan (Oricon)	22

== Certifications ==
Certifications and sales for "Taisetsu na Mono"
Region	Certification	Certified units/sales
Japan (RIAJ)	Gold	100,000^{*}
^{*} Sales figures based on certification alone.

== Credits and personnel ==
- Ai Carina Uemura – vocals, background vocals
- Gakushi – keyboard
- The Company – production
- Tom Coyne – mastering
- D.O.I. – mixing

== Release history ==
Release history and formats for "Taisetsu na Mono"
Region	Date	Format	Version	Label	Ref.
Japan	June 4, 2008	CD	Standard	Island; Universal Sigma	
Japan	June 4, 2008	CD	Limited	Island; Universal Sigma	
Various	June 4, 2008	Digital download; streaming	Standard	Island; Universal Sigma	
