= Okuribito (song) =

Single by Ai

from the album Viva Ai
- Language: Japanese
- A-side: "So Special (Version Ai)"
- Released: September 10, 2008
- Recorded: 2008
- Genre: R&B; J-pop
- Length: 3:39
- Label: Island; Universal Sigma
- Songwriters: Ai Uemura; Joe Hisaishi
- Producer: Hisaishi

Ai singles chronology
"Crazy World" (2008)	"Okuribito" / "So Special" (2008)	"Broken Strings" (2008)

Music video
- "Okuribito" on YouTube

"Okuribito" (おくりびと; lit. one who sends off) is a song recorded by Japanese-American singer-songwriter Ai, released on September 10, 2008, by Island Records and Universal Sigma. It served as the image song for the film of the same name, titled Departures in English.

== Background and release ==
After watching the Departures preview and hearing the instrumental of the image song, Ai worked with Joe Hisaishi to add lyrics to the instrumental piece. In July 2008, the song was announced. In August, the release date of the single was announced. "Okuribito" would be released physically alongside "So Special" as a double A-side single.

== Live performances ==
Ai performed the song live for the first time on September 6, 2008, at the Music Fair 21, days before the song was officially released.

== Charts ==
Chart (2008–09)	Peak position
Japan Singles Chart (Oricon)	15
Japan Hot 100 (Billboard Japan)	58
