= Brand New Day (Ai song) =

2007 single by Ai

- Digital single cover

Single by Ai

from the album Don't Stop Ai
- Language: Japanese; English
- A-side: "I'll Remember You"
- Released: July 18, 2007
- Length: 3:04
- Label: Island; Universal Sigma
- Songwriters: Ai Carina Uemura; Jonas Jeberg; Damon Sharpe; Simon Brenting; Greg Lawson
- Producers: Jonas Jeberg; Damon Sharpe

Ai singles chronology
"I Wanna Know" (2006)	"Brand New Day" / "I'll Remember You" (2007)	"One" (2007)

Music video
- "Brand New Day" on YouTube

"Brand New Day" is a song recorded by Japanese-American singer-songwriter Ai, released on July 18, 2007, by Island Records and Universal Sigma. Originally released digitally on June 13, 2007, "Brand New Day" was used by Japan Airlines for their JAL+One World television commercial.

== Background and release ==
After completing the What's Goin' On Ai Tour in December 2006, Ai became inspired to work on creating songs that would sound good performed live compared to her previous works. Wanting a song that was "fun" and "non-serious" in contrast to her previous singles from What's Goin' On Ai, Ai worked with Danish producer Jonas Jeberg to write and produce "Brand New Day".

On June 13, 2007, "Brand New Day" was released digitally ahead of its physical release. On July 18, "Brand New Day" was released alongside "I'll Remember You" as a double A-side maxi single. Two variants of "I'll Remember You" / "Brand New Day" were released. The standard edition includes the two A-side singles alongside karaoke versions of each song, a total of four tracks. A limited-edition version included a bonus DVD with the music videos for "I'll Remember You" and "Brand New Day".

== Production ==
"Brand New Day" is a track based on the same music as American High School Musical singer Corbin Bleu's song "Marchin'" from his 2007 debut album Another Side. Both recordings were produced by Jeberg and Damon Sharpe. "Marchin'" was released on Bleu's album one month before Ai's full length digital release of "Brand New Day", but one month after the ringtone release of Ai's version.

== Live performances ==
Ai performed "Brand New Day" at the Live Earth charity concert on July 7, 2007.

== Track listing ==
- Digital download, streaming and CD – Maxi single
  1. "I'll Remember You" – 3:59
  2. "Brand New Day" – 3:03
  3. "I'll Remember You" (karaoke) – 3:59
  4. "Brand New Day" (karaoke) – 3:03
- Limited edition CD and DVD
  1. "I'll Remember You" – 3:59
  2. "Brand New Day" – 3:03
  3. "I'll Remember You" (karaoke) – 3:59
  4. "Brand New Day" (karaoke) – 3:03
  5. "I'll Remember You" (music video)
  6. "Brand New Day" (music video)

== Personnel ==
- Ai – vocals
- Jonas Jeberg – production, instruments, drum programming
- Damon Sharpe – production
- Simon Brenting – drum programming
- Marco – mixing
- Y. Morita – pre-production recording
- OQD – engineering
- Tom Coyne – mastering

== Charts ==
Chart performance for "I'll Remember You" / "Brand New Day"
Chart (2007)	Peak position
Japan (Oricon)	13

== Release history ==
Release history and formats for "Brand New Day"
Region	Date	Format	Version	Label	Ref.
Various	June 13, 2007	Digital download; streaming	Digital pre-release	Island; Universal Sigma	
Japan	July 18, 2007	CD	Standard maxi single	Island; Universal Sigma	
Japan	July 18, 2007	CD; DVD	Limited maxi single	Island; Universal Sigma	
Various	July 18, 2007	Digital download; streaming	EP	Island; Universal Sigma	
