= So Special =

- CD-only cover

Single by Ai and Atsushi

from the album Viva Ai
- Language: Japanese; English
- A-side: "Okuribito"
- Released: September 10, 2008
- Recorded: 2008
- Genre: R&B; J-pop
- Length: 4:13
- Label: Island; Universal Sigma
- Songwriters: Ai Uemura; Atsushi Satō
- Producer: Uta

Ai singles chronology
"Crazy World" (2008)	"So Special" / "Okuribito" (2008)	"Broken Strings" (2008)

Music video
- "So Special (Version Ai)" on YouTube

"So Special" is a song recorded by Japanese-American singer-songwriter Ai and Japanese singer-songwriter Atsushi of Exile. It was released on September 10, 2008, alongside "Okuribito" as a double A-side single, by Island Records and Universal Sigma. The song and "Okuribito" served as the lead singles for Ai's seventh studio album, Viva Ai.

== Background ==
"So Special" was written by Ai and Atsushi as a duet. Two versions of the song were recorded, a "Version Ai" and a "Version EX". In July 2008, Avex Group announced the "Version EX" of the song was to be included on Exile's greatest hits album, Exile Entertainment Best. The band's greatest hits album was initially announced in June 2008. In August, Universal Japan announced Ai's version of the song was to be included on the physical release of "Okuribito", a song she recorded for Departures, as a double A-side single.

== Promotion and live performances ==
"So Special" was used as the Music Fighter power play song. Ai performed "So Special" with Atsushi on Music Station on September 12.

== Charts ==
Chart (2008)	Peak position
Japan Singles Chart (Oricon)	15
Japan Hot 100 (Billboard Japan)	14

== Certifications ==
Certifications and sales for "So Special"
Region	Certification	Certified units/sales
Japan (RIAJ) Digital Download	Gold	100,000^{*}
^{*} Sales figures based on certification alone.
