= AK-69 =

Japanese hip-hop artist

- Also known as: Kalassy Nikoff, Redsta
- Born: Takeshi Hiroki (武士 尋己); 1978
- Origin: Komaki, Aichi, Japan
- Genre: Hip hop
- Occupations: Rapper; singer
- Years active: 2003–present
- Label: Flying B Entertainment/Def Jam Recordings
- Website: ak-69.jp

AK-69, also known as Kalassy Nikoff (エーケーシックスティーナイン／カラシニコフ) is a Japanese hip-hop artist from Komaki, Aichi. As a rapper, AK-69 uses his stage name; while singing, he is usually known as "Kalassy Nikoff." AK-69 also goes by the alias "REDSTA." In 2004, he began producing a fashion line known as "BAGARCH." The single "Public Enemy" was nominated in 2011 for Best Hip Hop Music Video in the MTV Music Aid Japan, and won the same award at the 2011 Space Shower Music Video Awards. At the 2011 Billboard Japan Awards, AK-69 was selected as Independent Artist of the Year.

== Discography ==
=== Singles ===
1. B-ninjah & AK-69 "Red Hot Fighter" (7 March 2003)
2. Kalassy Nikoff "Never Gonna Stop／That Girl" (31 March 2004)
3. B-ninjah & AK-69 "Staaand up !!!" (19 January 2005)
4. AK-69 "69 -I'm a Player- " (21 September 2005)
5. AK-69 "Live For Da Hustle (feat. Billy Cook)" (25 October 2006)
6. AK-69 a.k.a. Kalassy Nikoff "Ding Ding Dong ～Heart's Bell (心の鐘)～" (19 September 2007)
7. AK-69 a.k.a. Kalassy Nikoff "Iron Horse-No Mark-／Let's Party" (18 February 2009)
8. AK-69 "Public Enemy" (25 August 2010)
9. AK-69 "69" (27 July 2011)
10. AK-69 "Swag in Da Bag" (21 March 2012)
11. AK-69 "Swag Walk" (26 September 2012)
12. AK-69 "The Show Must Go On" (21 November 2012)
13. AK-69 "Locker Room (ロッカールーム)-Go Hard or Go Home-" (24 September 2014)
14. AK-69 "Oh Lord (feat. Fabolous)" (17 December 2014)
15. AK-69 "Flying B" (24 February 2016)
16. AK-69 "With You / Kingpin" (6 July 2016)
17. AK-69 "I Still Shine (feat. Che'Nelle) / Stronger" (18 October 2017)
18. AK-69 "Brave feat. Toshl (X Japan)" (14 May 2018)

=== Albums ===
1. B-ninjah & AK-69 From the Street (25 October 2003)
2. B-ninjah & AK-69 Da Real Thing -from the street- (6 December 2003)
3. Kalassy Nikoff Paint the World (23 June 2004)
4. B-ninjah & AK-69 Natural Nine (24 March 2005)
5. AK-69 a.k.a. Kalassy Nikoff Redsta -The Rap Attacker- (22 February 2006)
6. Kalassy Nikoff Redsta -The Melodizm- (22 February 2006)
7. AK-69 a.k.a. Kalassy Nikoff Best of Redsta (20 December 2006)
8. Kalassy Nikoff The Story of Redsta (28 February 2007)
9. AK-69 The Story of Redsta (21 March 2007)
10. AK-69 a.k.a. Kalassy Nikoff Triumphant Return ～Redsta iz back～ (23 January 2008)
11. AK-69 a.k.a. Kalassy Nikoff The Story of Redsta ～Tour Final '08～ Chapter 1 (10 December 2008)
12. AK-69 a.k.a. Kalassy Nikoff The Story of Redsta ～Tour Final '08～ Chapter 2 (14 January 2009)
13. AK-69 The Cartel from Streets (2 September 2009)
14. AK-69 The Story of Redsta -Red Magic Tour 2009– Chapter 1 (24 February 2010)
15. AK-69 The Story of Redsta -Red Magic Tour 2009– Chapter 2 (24 March 2010)
16. AK-69 The Red Magic (26 January 2011)
17. AK-69 The Independent King (9 January 2013)
18. AK-69 The Throne (25 March 2015)
19. AK-69 Dawn (23 November 2016)
20. AK-69 The Anthem (27 February 2019)

=== DVD ===
1. "The Story of Redsta-69 Party-" (28 March 2008)
2. "THE STORY OF REDSTA -The Red Magic 2011– Chapter 1" (28 December 2011)
3. "THE STORY OF REDSTA -The Red Magic 2011– Chapter 2" (2 February 2012)
4. "THE MOVIE ～Road to The Independent King～" (10 July 2013)
5. "1:43372 Road to The Independent King ～THE ROOTS & THE FUTURE～" (30 July 2014)
6. "HALL TOUR 2015 FOR THE THRONE FINAL-COMPLETE EDITION-" (1 January 2016)
7. "Zepp Tour 2016 〜Flying B〜" (8 March 2017)

=== Guest appearance ===
- II-J "PLAY ON THE STREET" (22 January 2003) ※featuring B-ninjah & AK-69
- DS455 "Summer Sweetz" (7 July 2004)
- B-ninjah "SOUND TRACK 4 LIFE ～Life Music (人生音楽)～" (22 July 2004)
- Takehiro Kunugi"The Man The Fiddler" (22 July 2004)
- DJ 4-SIDE "THUGS 4 LIFE" (7 August 2004)
- II-J "PLAY ON THE STREET REMIX" (24 August 2004)
- DJ PMX "D'z Nuts FM Station VOL.1" (2 February 2005)
- DJ Ryow "PROJECT DREAMS"' (31 March 2005)
- "E"qual "The Rock City ～M.O.S.A.D.'s Town～"' (21 September 2005)
- SYGNAL ENDLESS FILE "Beginning of Legend"' (26 October 2005)
- DJ RYOW&TOMOKIYO(GRAND BEATZ) "PROJECT DREAMS pt.2" (15 August 2006)
- DJ 4-SIDE "THUGS 4 LIFE II" (16 August 2006)
- GDX "SLOW BURNING" (4 October 2006)
- ANARCHY "ROB THE WORLD" (13 December 2006)
- sand "NUTHIN’BUT A BITTER MOUTH" (10 March 2007)
- GIPPER "Gip-code" (23 May 2007)
- YORK "SOLDIER" (30 May 2007)
- BIG RON "MISTA XXXXXL" (6 June 2007)
- II-J "NEW OLD STOCK" (13 June 2007)
- DJ RYOW&TOMOKIYO(GRAND BEATZ) "PROJECT DREAMS PT.3~Since 2002・・・~" (27 June 2007)
- EL LATINO "LOS 13 ANGELES" (18 July 2007)
- "E"qual "KING & QUEEN" (18 July 2007)
- HOKT "BAD BOY PARADISE" (8 August 2007)
- DJ RYOW&TOMOKIYO(GRAND BEATZ) "PROJECT DREAMS PT.4" (15 August 2007)
- DJ GO"730 RAIDERS" (19 September 2007)
- GANXTA CUE"DAWN OF NEW ERA" (19 September 2007)
- DJ PMX "THE ORIGINAL" (24 September 2008)
- YORK "Brotherhood" (26 September 2008)
- "E"qual "TV Crushman & Radio JackerTV Crushman & Radio Jacker" (26 November 2008)
- Spicy Chocolate "This Road (この道を) REMIX" (23 December 2008)
- Horai "Heisei Zipangu(平成ジパング)" (3 December 2008)
- Rowshi "PRIDE" (3 December 2008))
- EXTRIDE "It's My Life" (21 January 2009))
- Koda Kumi "Trick" (28 January 2009)
- twenty4-7 "PROGRESS" (18 February 2009)
- DJ RYOW&TOMOKIYO(GRAND BEATZ) "PROJECT DREAMS PT.5" (25 March 2009)
- Lisa Yamaguchi "Sunshine" (1 July 2009)
- DJ MAYUMI "PARADISE" (29 July 2009)
- RIKI "National Domination " (全国制覇)(7 October 2009)
- Shion "Truth" (7 October 2009)
- G.CUE "G.A.N.X.T.A." (11 November 2009)
- DJ Ryow "BEST OF TOKONA-X mixed by DJ RYOW " (25 November 2009)
- HI-D "It's Not Over" (23 December 2009)
- DJ RYUUKI "CONSPIRACY" (20 January 2010)
- AKIRA "VICE" (25 January 2010)
- MOST MAJESTIC MIND "NO WAY DUDE" (5 April 2010)
- NATO "13 BEATS TO DIE" (12 May 2010)
- COMA-CHI "Beauty or the Beast?" (26 May 2010)
- KJI "GH -The First Gate-" (24 June 2010)
- ZANG HAOZI "SIN" (21 July 2010)
- YORK "Key of Life" (25 August 2010)
- DJ MOTO "052 BIG BOSS" (15 September 2010)
- G.B.L. "Lucky Child" (8 December 2010)
- DS455 "TRIBUTE TO DS455" (8 December 2010)
- ROWSHI "AFFECTION & HATE" (18 May 2011)
- DJ RYOW "MORE THAN MUSIC" (25 May 2011)
- SIMON "twice born" (8 June 2011)
- HORI "K.O.N" (29 June 2011)
- ALLY & DIAZ "ALLY & DIAZ" (29 June 2011)
- SPICY CHOCOLATE "Shibuya RAGGA SWEET COLLECTION" (14 September 2009)
- DJ☆GO "THE BLUE LINE" (21 September 2011)
- SAY "Virgo" (12 October 2011)
- Lisa Yamaguchi "LOVE & PRIDE" (25 January 2012)
- A-1 "NEVER MIND" (25 January 2012)
- Tinashe "Player" (25 April 2018)
