= I'll Remember You (Ai song) =

2007 single by Ai

- CD limited and digital edition cover

Single by Ai

from the album Don't Stop Ai
- Language: Japanese; English
- A-side: "Brand New Day"
- Released: July 18, 2007
- Label: Island; Universal Sigma
- Songwriters: Ai Carina Uemura; Jonas Jeberg; Anders Bagge; Sylvia Bennet-Smith; Marc Smith
- Producer: Jonas Jeberg

Ai singles chronology
"I Wanna Know" (2006)	"I'll Remember You" / "Brand New Day" (2007)	"One" (2007)

Music video
- "I'll Remember You" on YouTube

"I'll Remember You" is a song recorded by Japanese-American singer-songwriter Ai, released on July 18, 2007, by Island Records and Universal Sigma. A midtempo recording, "I'll Remember You" was used in a series of commercial tie-ins, peaking at number 13 on the Oricon Singles Chart upon its release.

== Background and release ==
Ai teased "I'll Remember You" at the 2007 MTV Video Music Awards Japan, performing the song live during the ceremony. A physical maxi single was announced for release in July, with "I'll Remember You" serving as an A-side alongside "Brand New Day", which was released to digital platforms as a promotional single in June.

Two variants of "I'll Remember You" / "Brand New Day" were released. The standard edition includes the two A-side singles alongside karaoke versions of each song, a total of four tracks. A limited-edition version included a bonus DVD with the music videos for "I'll Remember You" and "Brand New Day".

== Promotion ==
"I'll Remember You" was used in a 2007 campaign by Audio-Technica. Digital music media provider Music.jp used "I'll Remember You" in a series of commercials.

== Live performances ==
Ai performed "I'll Remember You" for the first time prior to its release at the 2007 MTV Video Music Awards Japan. She also performed the song at the Live Earth charity concert in Tokyo. Holding a free concert outside the Tokyo Metropolitan Government Building, she performed "I'll Remember You" as part of the Beijing Olympics campaign.

== Track listing ==
- Digital download, streaming and CD
  1. "I'll Remember You" – 3:59
  2. "Brand New Day" – 3:03
  3. "I'll Remember You" (karaoke) – 3:59
  4. "Brand New Day" (karaoke) – 3:03
- Limited edition CD and DVD
  1. "I'll Remember You" – 3:59
  2. "Brand New Day" – 3:03
  3. "I'll Remember You" (karaoke) – 3:59
  4. "Brand New Day" (karaoke) – 3:03
  5. "I'll Remember You" (music video)
  6. "Brand New Day" (music video)

== Credits and personnel ==
- Ai Carina Uemura – vocals
- Thomas Anderson – guitar
- Jonas Jeberg – instruments, production, drum programming
- Y. Morita – pre-production engineering
- OQD – engineering
- D.O.I. – mixing
- Tom Coyne – mastering

== Charts ==
Chart performance for "I'll Remember You" / "Brand New Day"
Chart (2007)	Peak position
Japan (Oricon)	13

== Certification ==
Certifications and sales for "I'll Remember You"
Region	Certification	Certified units/sales
Japan (RIAJ) Physical	Gold	100,000^{^}
Japan (RIAJ) Digital	Gold	100,000^{*}
^{*} Sales figures based on certification alone.^{^} Shipments figures based on certification alone.

== Release history ==
Release history and formats for "I'll Remember You"
Region	Date	Format	Version	Label	Ref.
Japan	July 18, 2007	CD	Standard	Island; Universal Sigma	
Japan	July 18, 2007	CD; DVD	Limited	Island; Universal Sigma	
Various	July 18, 2007	Digital download; streaming	Standard	Island; Universal Sigma	
