= Judith Hill =

American singer-songwriter

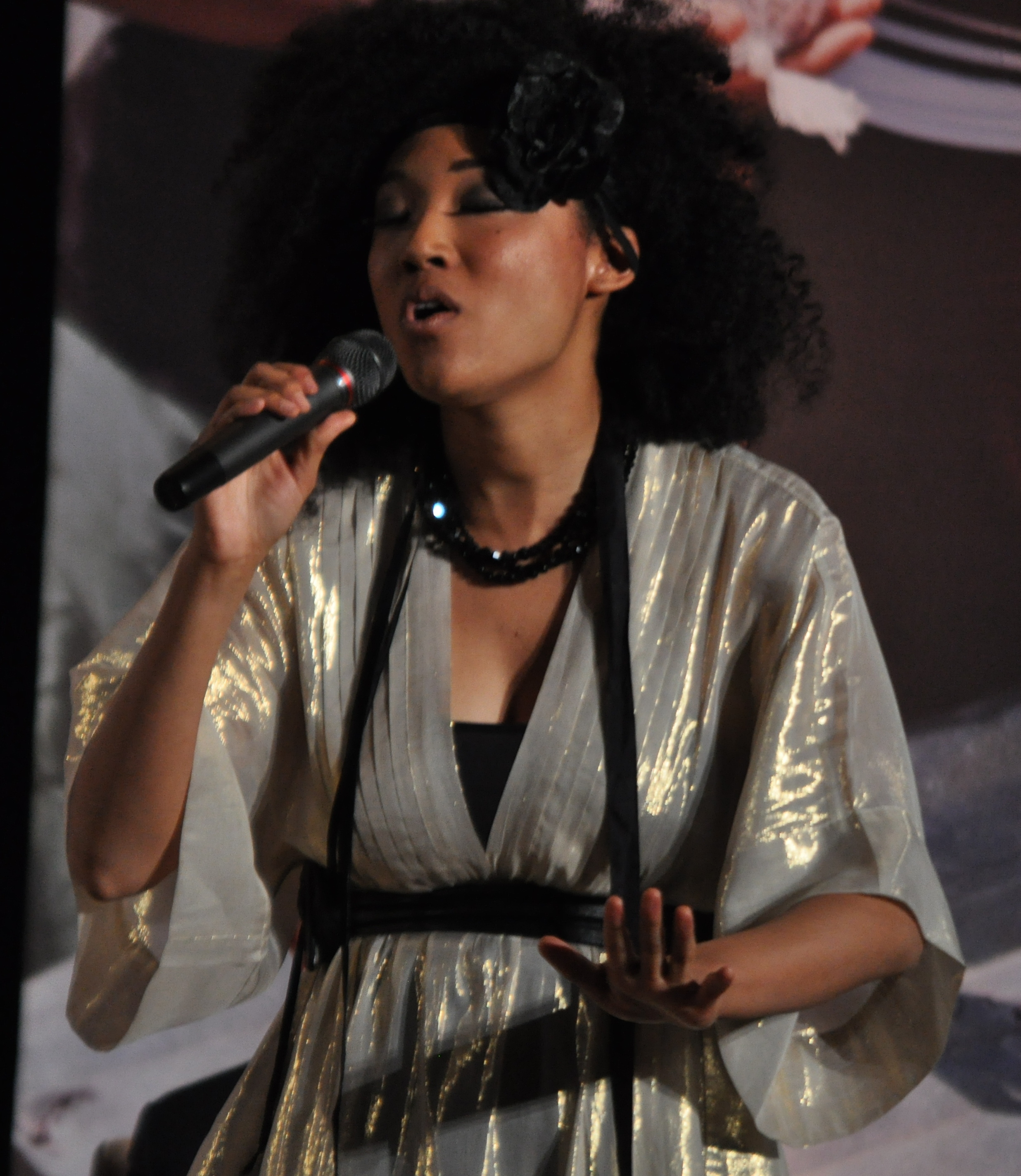
- Hill performing at the 2011 International Women of Courage ceremony

Background information
- Born: Judith Glory Hill; May 6, 1984 (age 42); Los Angeles, California, U.S.
- Genres: Pop, soul, Contemporary R&B, neo-soul, funk, jazz
- Occupations: Singer-songwriter, musician, composer
- Instruments: Vocals, piano, guitar, bass
- Years active: 2007–present
- Label: Sony Music NPG
- Website: judithhill.com

Judith Glory Hill (born May 6, 1984) is an American singer-songwriter from Los Angeles, California. She has provided backing vocals for such artists as Michael Jackson, Prince, and Josh Groban. In 2009, Hill was chosen as Jackson's duet partner for the song "I Just Can't Stop Loving You" during his This Is It rehearsals. After Jackson's death in 2009, she, along with the rest of the This Is It cast members, performed at Jackson's memorial service and attracted global attention when she sang the lead on the song "Heal the World". Hill's rise to fame is recounted in 20 Feet from Stardom, a documentary film that tells the untold story of the backup singers behind some of the "greatest musical legends of the 21st century". She is also a featured artist on the film's soundtrack. She won the Grammy Award for Best Music Film for her performance.

A number of Hill's original ballads, including "Desperation", were featured in the 2012 Spike Lee film Red Hook Summer. In March 2013, Hill became a contestant during the fourth season of The Voice. Hill opened for Josh Groban during the third leg of his All That Echoes World Tour (North America) in Fall 2013. She also performed two duets with him in his set for "The Prayer" and "Remember When It Rained", the latter of which was released as a single. She also toured with John Legend on the UK leg of his #AllOfMe tour in the Fall of 2014.

Her debut album Back in Time, recorded at Paisley Park with Prince as co-producer, was officially released as a free download on Judith Hill's WeTransfer account on March 23 and made available until March 25, 2015, via a Livenation email with a note from Prince.

== Life and career ==
Hill's mother Michiko Hill (née Yoshimura) is a pianist from Tokyo, Japan, who met Hill's father Robert Lee "Pee Wee" Hill in a funk group in the 1970s. Judith's mother is Japanese and her father is African-American. She can speak and sing in both English and Japanese and is also fluent in French and Spanish. Hill is a 2002 YoungArts alumnus.

After a degree in music composition from Biola University, Hill went to France in 2007 to perform with the French singer Michel Polnareff. She began a career as a singer-songwriter when she returned to the United States.

According to Tom Meek of LA Weekly, Hill's voice is distinctive, soulful and has an earthy quality that makes it unique. She moves easily from R&B to funk to hip-hop to jazz to gospel.

Hill is credited for singing backing vocals and/or choir for Gregg Allman (Low Country Blues); Anastacia (Freak of Nature); Patrizio Buanne (Patrizio); Andraé Crouch (The Journey); Harold Faltermeyer (Copout); Josh Groban (All That Echoes); Taylor Hicks (Taylor Hicks); Carole King (A Holiday Carole); Evelyn "Champagne" King (Open Book); Mike Oldfield (Man on the Rocks); Barry Manilow (15 Minutes); Dave Stewart (The Ringmaster General and The Blackbird Diaries); Rod Stewart (Soulbook); Robbie Williams (Intensive Care); Incubus (Trust Fall (Side A), song "Dance Like You're Dumb").

She is a featured vocalist for albums such as Inspiration: A Tribute to Nat King Cole by George Benson, I'll Take Romance by Steve Tyrell, The Last Ai by Ai and That's Life by Landau Eugene Murphy Jr. She has also provided vocals for soundtracks such as Dr. Seuss' The Lorax: Original Songs from the Motion Picture and Happy Feet Two (Soundtrack).

A number of Hill's original ballads, including "Desperation" produced by Brian West, were featured in the 2012 Spike Lee film Red Hook Summer, which premiered at the 2012 Sundance Film Festival. About Hill, Lee said to Rolling Stone: "She's a phenomenal talent. She can sing with the best of them."

Hill signed a record deal with Sony Music in 2013.

On February 9, 2014, Hill appeared as a back-up singer in the CBS show The Beatles: A Night That Changed America.

Hill was the featured singer on Gerard Way's original song titled "Here Comes the End", released on July 8, 2020, which appears on the second season of The Umbrella Academy.

Hill was a featured vocalist on Eric Clapton's single "How Could We Know", released on July 14, 2023. Other featured guests on the song are Simon Climie on vocals and Daniel Santiago on acoustic guitar. November 17, 2023 in Atlantic City, she performed lead vocals for Chicago and Friends.

On June 21, 2024, in Minneapolis, The Revolution welcomed Hill as a special guest vocalist when they reunited to celebrate 40 Years of Prince's album Purple Rain. Joe Lynch of Billboard stated that when she took lead on the yearning, lusty vocal showcase "The Beautiful Ones", "Hill offered up effortlessly silky runs and skyscraping, soulful peaks, absolutely dominating a song that's near impossible to cover."

=== Solo recording career ===
Judith Hill's debut solo album, Back In Time released in 2015. The 11-track album was written by Hill and produced by Prince. Livenation.com offered it as a free download to subscribers and received 50,000 downloads on the first day.

2021's Baby, I'm Hollywood! garnered acclaim from SPIN. That year, Hill also penned a guest essay for Atwood Magazine about the culture of music.

On September 15, 2023, Hill released "Runaway Train", the first single from her studio album Letters from a Black Widow, which was released April 26, 2024.

=== Michael Jackson ===
In 2009, Hill was selected as Michael Jackson's duet partner for the This Is It concerts; she practiced for months with Jackson up until his death on June 25, 2009.

Michael Jackson's death caused the concerts to be cancelled. Along with the rest of the This Is It cast members, Hill performed at Jackson's memorial service at the Staples Center in downtown Los Angeles on July 7, 2009. She attracted global attention when she sang the lead on the song "Heal the World", which was one of the climactic moments of the service.

Hill also released a tribute to Jackson, "I Will Always Be Missing You", named after her duet with Jackson "I Just Can't Stop Loving You" in the to-be This Is It concert. It was given as a free download from her website starting late 2009, and was released on iTunes on January 26, 2010 (the same day as the This Is It DVD release) — with all proceeds going to Childhelp US.

=== The Voice ===
Hill auditioned for the fourth season of The Voice. In the first episode of the season broadcast on March 25, 2013, she sang "What a Girl Wants" by Christina Aguilera with all four judges, Adam Levine, Shakira, Usher and Blake Shelton pressing their "I Want You" button and turning their chairs. After a hard decision, she chose to join Team Adam. "She's going to be a Grammy-winning superstar, and she's on my team", Levine stated.

For the battle rounds, Hill faced off with Karina Iglesias, singing "It's a Man's Man's Man's World", which along with Amanda Brown and Trevin Hunte's "Vision of Love" and also Jesse Campbell and Anthony Evan's "If I Ain't Got You", was considered one of the best battles in Voice history. Levine chose her to move on from his team, thus entering the Knockout Rounds. In the Knockout Rounds, Hill was paired against Sasha Allen and won. Therefore, she entered the top 16, the start of the live shows. She was considered a frontrunner in the competition; however, after her Top 8 performance, she was eliminated on May 28, 2013. She and her teammate Sarah Simmons' eliminations at the Top 8 show was considered one of the most shocking of the season. Said Katy Kroll of Rolling Stone: "It's a sad loss for the show, as Judith had the type of vocal chops and stage presence that should really be rewarded by such a competition."

Performances on The Voice:

– Studio version of performance reached the top 10 on iTunes

Stage	Song	Original Artist	Date	Order	Result
Blind Audition	"What a Girl Wants"	Christina Aguilera	March 25, 2013	1.14	All four chairs turned Joined Team Adam
Battle Rounds	"It's a Man's Man's Man's World" (vs. Karina Iglesias)	James Brown	April 15, 2013	7.6	Saved by Coach
Knockout Rounds	"Always on My Mind" (vs. Orlando Dixon)	Brenda Lee	April 29, 2013	11.5	Saved by Coach
Live Playoffs	"Feeling Good"	Nina Simone	May 6, 2013	14.8	Saved by Public Vote
Live Top 12	"You've Got a Friend"	James Taylor	May 13, 2013	17.9	Saved by Public Vote
Live Top 10	"The Way You Make Me Feel"	Michael Jackson	May 20, 2013	20.2	Saved by Public Vote
Live Top 8	"#thatPOWER"	will.i.am feat. Justin Bieber	May 27, 2013	22.1	Eliminated

=== 20 Feet from Stardom ===
Hill and several backup singers are featured in the documentary film 20 Feet from Stardom, which debuted at the 2013 Sundance Film Festival and opened in US theaters on June 14, 2013. The movie won the 2014 Oscar & Critics Choice Award for documentary feature and Hill won a Black Reel Award for Outstanding Original Song for "Desperation". 20 Feet from Stardom also won the 2015 Grammy Award for Best Music Film, with the award being presented to the featured artists as well as the production crew.

=== Josh Groban ===
Hill sings backing vocals on three of Josh Groban's songs for the album All That Echoes and was the opening act during the third leg of his All That Echoes World Tour (North America) in Fall 2013. She also performed two duets with him in his set for "The Prayer" and "Remember When It Rained", the latter of which was released as a single. She appears in Groban's official video for his song "Brave".

=== John Legend ===
Hill was the opening act for John Legend on his #AllOfMe Tour in the UK in the autumn of 2014.

=== Gordon Goodwin's Big Phat Band ===
Hill is the featured vocalist on her composition "Party Rockers", which appears on Gordon Goodwin's Big Phat Band's album Life in the Bubble. The song was nominated for a 2015 Grammy Award for Best Arrangement, Instrumental and Vocals.

=== Prince ===
On March 22, 2015, Prince invited representatives from several Minnesota media outlets to preview Hill's debut album at Paisley Park. Six selections were played from Back in Time, which Hill recorded in two or three weeks at Paisley Park with Prince as producer. "It's the fastest album I've ever made," he said. Surprisingly, Prince did not discover Hill on The Voice or in the Michael Jackson movie This Is It, where she was featured as a backup singer in rehearsal for his upcoming tour. He learned about her when he saw a video clip of her being interviewed on a Revolt TV show and she mentioned that she would like to work with Prince. He went on to produce her debut album, Back In Time (2015).

Hill sang "Nothing Compares 2 U" on February 20, 2026, at halftime of a game between the Minnesota Timberwolves and Dallas Mavericks.

== Discography ==
=== Studio albums ===
- 2015: Back in Time
- 2018: Golden Child
- 2019: Studio Live Session
- 2021: Baby, I'm Hollywood!
- 2024: Letters from a Black Widow

=== Singles ===
- 2009: "I Will Always Be Missing You"
- 2013: "Desperation"
- 2014: "Remember When It Rained" Duet with Josh Groban
- 2014: "Party Rockers" on Gordon Goodwin's Big Phat Band's album Life in the Bubble
- 2015: "Cry Cry Cry" from the Back in Time album
- 2018: "Abracadabra"
- 2019: "Upside"
- 2020: "Here Comes the End" with Gerard Way
- 2023: "Runaway Train"
- 2024: "Flame"
- 2024: "Dame De La Lumière"
- 2024: "Black Widow"

=== Soundtracks ===
- 2012: Red Hook Summer (Songs from the Original Motion Picture Soundtrack)

== Filmography ==
Year	Film	Role
2009	Michael Jackson's This Is It	Herself
2013	20 Feet from Stardom	Herself

== Awards ==
- 2014: Black Reel Award – Outstanding Original Song, "Desperation", Twenty Feet from Stardom
- 2015: 57th Annual Grammy Awards – Grammy Award for Best Music Film
- 2016: Nominated for NAACP Award Outstanding New Artist
- 2026: NAMM She Rocks Award
