= James Morrison discography =

Discography of James Morrison

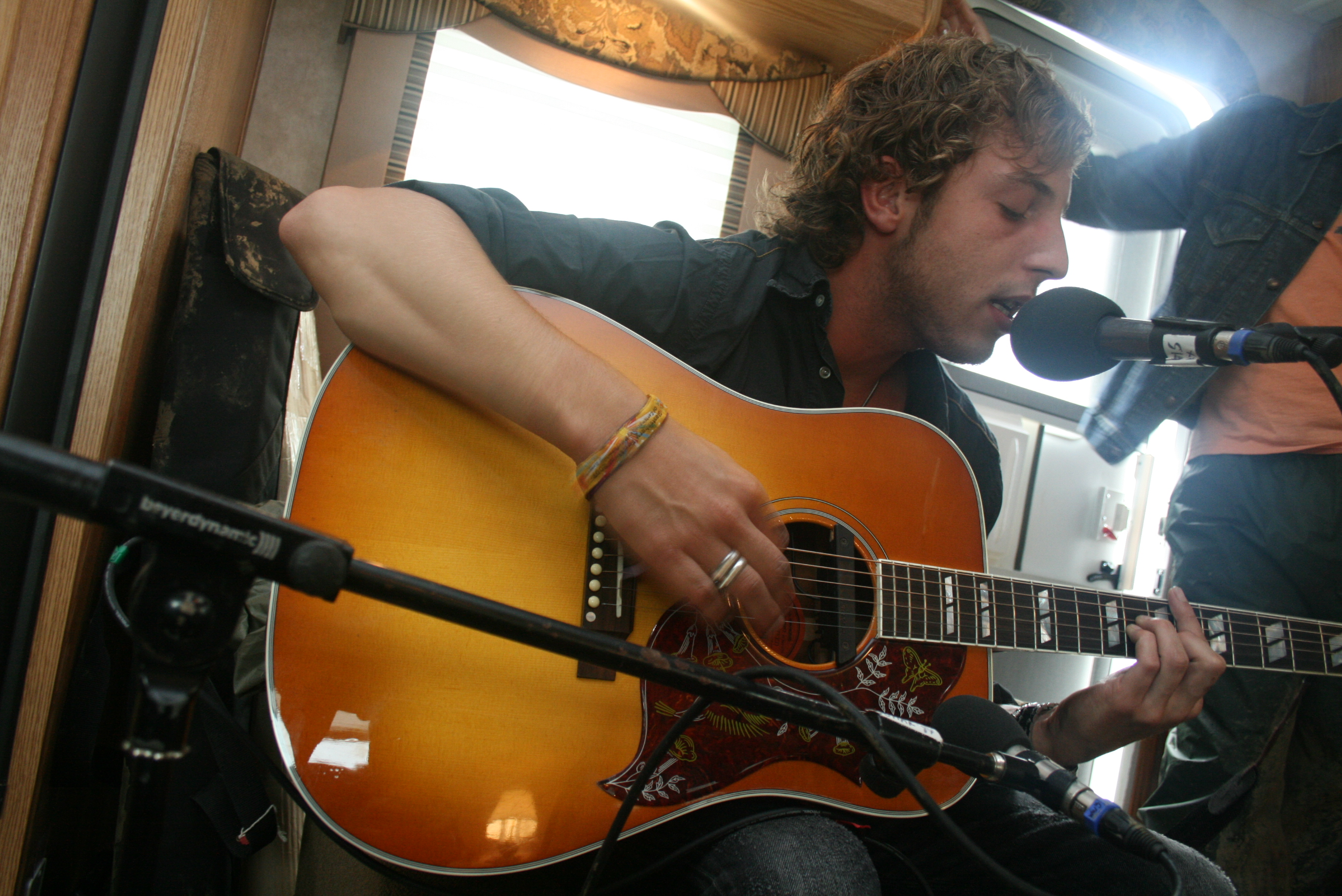
- Morrison performing at the 2007 Glastonbury Festival
- Studio albums: 6
- Extended plays: 2
- Singles: 20
- Music videos: 21

The discography of James Morrison, an English singer, songwriter, and guitarist, consists of six studio albums, two EPs, twenty singles, twenty-one music videos, and a number of other appearances.

Morrison released Undiscovered, his debut album, in 2006. It topped the UK Albums Chart and reached the top ten in other countries and was certified three times platinum by the British Phonographic Industry. Morrison was also the biggest-selling British male solo artist in 2006. His debut single was also his most successful; "You Give Me Something" reached the top ten in nine countries including peaks of number five on the UK Singles Chart and number one in New Zealand. Morrison's second album, Songs for You, Truths for Me, was released in September 2008. It reached number three in the UK, and the top 20 in six other countries. The two albums have sold some 4.5 million copies. In September 2011 Morrison released his third album The Awakening, which debuted at number one in the UK.

== Albums ==
=== Studio albums ===
List of albums, with selected chart positions and certifications
Title	Details	Peak chart positions										Certifications
Title	Details	UK	AUS	AUT	GER	IRE	NLD	NZ	SWE	SWI	US	Certifications
Undiscovered	Released: 10 July 2006; Label: Polydor (#9878240); Format: CD, digital download	1	17	14	13	5	5	4	10	15	24	BPI: 5× Platinum; ARIA: Platinum; BVMI: Gold; IRMA: Platinum; NVPI: Gold; RMNZ: Platinum; IFPI SWI: Gold
Songs for You, Truths for Me	Released: 26 September 2008; Label: Polydor (#1779250); Format: CD, digital download	3	21	26	13	1	11	19	25	12	49	BPI: 3× Platinum
The Awakening	Released: 23 September 2011; Label: Island; Format: CD, digital download	1	9	5	11	2	7	29	7	1	49	BPI: Platinum; ARIA: Gold; BMVI: Gold; IFPI AUT: Gold
Higher Than Here	Released: 30 October 2015; Label: Island; Format: CD, digital download	7	94	33	22	45	15	—	—	3	—	BPI: Silver
You're Stronger Than You Know	Released: 8 March 2019; Label: Stanley Park; Format: CD, digital download, streaming	14	— (Note: You're Stronger Than You Know did not enter the ARIA Albums Chart, but peaked at number 48 on the ARIA Digital Album Chart.)	52	37	—	58	—	—	12	—	
Fight Another Day	Released: 3 October 2025; Label: Cooking Vinyl; Format: CD, digital download, streaming	5	—	—	—	—	—	—	—	63	—	
"—" denotes album that did not chart or was not released.

=== Compilation albums ===
Title	Details	Peak chart positions
Title	Details	UK
Greatest Hits	Released: 11 February 2022; Label: Believe; Format: cassette, CD, digital download, streaming	6

== Extended plays ==
Title	Details
Live from Air Studios, London	Released: 5 May 2009; Label: Polydor; Format: digital download
iTunes Festival: London 2011	Released: 5 August 2011; Label: Island; Format: digital download

== Singles ==
=== As lead artist ===
Title	Year	Peak chart positions										Certifications	Album
Title	Year	UK	AUS	AUT	GER	IRE	NL	NOR	NZ	SWE	SWI	Certifications	Album
"You Give Me Something"	2006	5	7	8	31	14	2	10	1	25	4	BPI: Platinum; RMNZ: Gold	Undiscovered
"Wonderful World"	2006	8	—	57	87	31	8	—	16	—	35	BPI: Gold	Undiscovered
"The Pieces Don't Fit Anymore"	2006	30	—	—	—	—	30	—	—	—	—	—	Undiscovered
"Undiscovered"	2007	63	—	—	—	—	30	—	—	—	—		Undiscovered
"One Last Chance"	2007	—	—	—	—	—	—	—	—	—	—		Undiscovered
"You Make It Real"	2008	7	100	—	71	38	18	—	—	—	—	BPI: Gold	Songs for You, Truths for Me
"Broken Strings" (featuring Nelly Furtado)	2008	2	80	2	1	2	5	14	10	5	1	BPI: 3× Platinum; BVMI: Platinum; IFPI SWI: Gold; RMNZ: Gold	Songs for You, Truths for Me
"Please Don't Stop the Rain"	2009	33	—	—	—	44	20	—	—	—	51		Songs for You, Truths for Me
"Nothing Ever Hurt Like You"	2009	149	—	—	—	—	9	—	—	—	—		Songs for You, Truths for Me
"Get to You"	2009	104	—	—	—	—	25	—	—	—	—		Songs for You, Truths for Me
"I Won't Let You Go"	2011	5	13	1	11	11	55	8	—	42	3	BPI: Platinum; ARIA: 4× Platinum; BVMI: Gold; FIMI: Platinum	The Awakening
"Up" (featuring Jessie J)	2011	30	—	24	19	—	43	—	—	—	37		The Awakening
"Slave to the Music"	2012	—	—	—	—	—	10	—	—	—	—		The Awakening
"One Life"	2012	159	—	—	—	—	—	—	—	—	—		The Awakening
"Beautiful Life"	2012	—	—	—	—	—	42	—	—	—	—		The Awakening
"Demons"	2015	— (Note: "Demons" failed to enter the UK Singles Chart, but peaked at number 73 on the UK Singles Sales Chart.)	—	—	—	—	29	—	—	—	—		Higher Than Here
"Stay Like This"	2015	—	—	—	—	—	54	—	—	—	—		Higher Than Here
"I Need You Tonight"	2016	—	—	—	—	—	—	—	—	—	—		Higher Than Here
"My Love Goes On" (featuring Joss Stone)	2019	— (Note: "My Love Goes On" failed to enter the UK Singles Chart, but peaked at number 98 on the UK Singles Sales Chart.)	—	—	—	—	—	—	—	—	—		You're Stronger Than You Know
"Power"	2019	—	—	—	—	—	—	—	—	—	—		You're Stronger Than You Know
"So Beautiful"	2019	—	—	—	—	—	—	—	—	—	—		You're Stronger Than You Know
"Who's Gonna Love Me Now?"	2021	—	—	—	—	—	—	—	—	—	—		Greatest Hits
"Don't Mess with Love"	2022	— (Note: "Don't Mess with Love" failed to enter the UK Singles Chart, but peaked at number 48 on the UK Singles Sales Chart.)	—	—	—	—	—	—	—	—	—		Greatest Hits
"Fight Another Day"	2025	— (Note: "Fight Another Day" failed to enter the UK Singles Chart, but peaked at number 50 on the UK Singles Sales Chart.)	—	—	—	—	—	—	—	—	—		Fight Another Day
"The Man Who Can't Be Loved"	2025	—	—	—	—	—	—	—	—	—	—		Fight Another Day
"Little Wings"	2025	—	—	—	—	—	—	—	—	—	—		Fight Another Day
"Cry Your Tears on Me"	2025	—	—	—	—	—	—	—	—	—	—		Fight Another Day
"Driftwood" (with Seafret)	2026	—	—	—	—	—	—	—	—	—	—		Fear of Emotion
"—" denotes a release that did not chart or was not released.

=== As featured artist ===
Title	Year	Peak chart positions	Album
Title	Year	UK	Album
"Stop Crying Your Heart Out" (as BBC Radio 2's Allstars)	2020	7	Non-album single

== Other charted songs ==
Title	Year	Peak	Album
Title	Year	UK	Album
"Sitting on a Platform"	2008	136	"You Make It Real" single

== Music videos ==
Title	Year	Director(s)
"You Give Me Something"	2006	Phil Andalman, Magali Selosse
"You Give Me Something" (second version)	2006	Sam Brown
"Wonderful World"	2006	Sam Brown
"The Pieces Don't Fit Anymore"	2006	David Mould
"Undiscovered"	2007	Mark Wordsworth
"One Last Chance"	2007	—N/a
"You Make It Real"	2008	Daniel Wolfe
"Nothing Ever Hurt Like You"	2008	Nick and Fred
"Broken Strings" (featuring Nelly Furtado)	2008	Micah Meisner
"Please Don't Stop the Rain"	2009	David Edwards
"Get to You"	2009	Daniel Wolfe
"I Won't Let You Go"	2011	Phil Griffin
"Up" (featuring Jessie J)	2011	Leanne Stott
"Slave to the Music"	2011	Phil Griffin
"One Life"	2012	Alex Grazioli
"Beautiful Life"	2012	N/A
"Right by Your Side"	2012	N/A
"Demons"	2015	Greg & Lio
"Stay Like This"	2015	—N/a
"I Need You Tonight"	2016	Alex Grazioli
"My Love Goes On" (featuring Joss Stone)	2019	—N/a
"Don't Mess with Love"	2022	—N/a

== Songwriting credits ==
Title	Year	Artist	Album
"Heart on My Sleeve"	2010	Olly Murs	Olly Murs
"My Love Is Like a Star"	2011	Demi Lovato	Unbroken
"Meaning of Life"	2017	Kelly Clarkson	Meaning of Life

== Other appearances ==
Title	Year	Title
"It's Too Late" (Carole King cover)	2006	Take It Easy: 15 Soft Rock Anthems (Q Playlist)
"Come Back and Stay" (Paul Young cover)	2007	Radio 1 Established 1967
"Details in the Fabric" (with Jason Mraz)	2008	We Sing. We Dance. We Steal Things.
"Watch and Wait"	2009	Männerherzen (Original Motion Picture Soundtrack)
"A Change Is Gonna Come" (Sam Cooke cover)	2010	The Imagine Project
