= Undiscovered =

Undiscovered may refer to:

- Undiscovered (film), a 2005 film starring Steven Strait, Ashlee Simpson and Carrie Fisher.
- Undiscovered (Brooke Hogan album), 2006
- Undiscovered (James Morrison album), 2006
  - "Undiscovered" (song), the title song
- "Undiscovered", a song by Ashlee Simpson from Autobiography, 2004
- "The Undiscovered", a 1997 short story by William Sanders
- Undiscovered (podcast) a show produced by Science Friday and WNYC Studios

== See also ==
- Discovery (disambiguation)
