= Fight Another Day (album) =

Studio album by James Morrison
- Released: 3 October 2025
- Genre: Pop
- Length: 46:17
- Label: Cooking Vinyl
- Producers: Adam James; Paul Meehan; Kjetil Mørland; Andy Platts; Steve Robson; Mark Taylor; Eg White

James Morrison chronology
You're Stronger Than You Know (2019)	Fight Another Day (2025)

Singles from Fight Another Day
- 1. "Fight Another Day" Released: 13 June 2025; 2. "The Man Who Can't Be Loved" Released: 27 June 2025; 3. "Little Wings" Released: 25 July 2025; 4. "Cry Your Tears on Me" Released: 27 August 2025

Fight Another Day is the seventh album by English singer James Morrison, released on 3 October 2025 by Cooking Vinyl.

== Background and music ==
In an interview for The Line of Best Fit, Morrison told Max Gayler he loved doing cover versions, noting that while "Busking, playing pubs, you always had to play a cover. I think it's a good gauge of what an artist really is when they sing another version of someone else's song".

== Reception ==
Professional ratings
Review scores
Source	Rating
Rolling Stone Germany	3/5 stars

Writing for Rolling Stone Germany, Marc Vetter wrote Morrison "focuses on his strengths. These lie, as always, in (polished) blues and soul. Of course, some power ballads flirt with dangerous kitsch territory, but when this is done with a heartfelt nod to Stevie Wonder, as in "Little Wings", it's perfectly fine". AllMusic's biography of Morrison, written by Mark Deming, states that it is a "deeply personal album that found him coming through a difficult period, including the death of his former partner, being a father and working through his own emotional struggles"

== Track listing ==
Fight Another Day track listing
No.	Title	Writer(s)	Length
1.	"Fight Another Day"	James Morrison; Kjetil Mørland; Paul Meehan	3:51
2.	"Save a Place for Me"	Morrison; Mørland; Meehan	2:50
3.	"The Man Who Can't Be Loved"	Adam James; Morrison; Mørland	3:23
4.	"Cry Your Tears on Me"	Morrison; Mørland; Meehan	3:46
5.	"Little Wings"	Morrison; Andy Platts; Connor Reeves	4:05
6.	"Ten Thousand Men"	Morrison; Mørland; Meehan	3:24
7.	"Closest Thing to Love"	Morrison; James; Mørland	3:47
8.	"Something That I Can't Forget"	Morrison; James; Meehan	3:49
9.	"Slow Heart Attack"	Morrison; Steve Robson; Tim Deal	3:23
10.	"Silver Lining"	Morrison; James; Meehan	4:01
11.	"Made of Man"	Morrison; James; Reeves	3:55
12.	"New Day"	Morrison; Daniel Merriweather; Matthew David Zara	2:38
13.	"Fill My Glass"	Morrison; Francis Anthony White	3:30
Total length:			46:17

=== Notes ===
- Daniel Merriweather is misspelled as Daniel Merryweather.

== Credits and personnel ==
Credits adapted from Tidal:

=== Performers ===
- James Morrison – vocals, guitar
- Rocco Palladino – bass guitar (tracks 1–4, 6–10)
- Adam Phillips – guitar (tracks 1–10)
- Paul Meehan – keyboards (tracks 1–10)
- Conner Reeves – background vocals (tracks 5, 11)
- Cameron Dawson – bass guitar (track 5)
- Pat Levett – harmonica (track 5)
- Kjetil Mørland – keyboards (track 9)
- Andy Platts – drums (track 11)
- Shawn Lee – drums (track 11)
- Terry Lewis – guitar (track 11)

=== Production ===
- Kjetil Mørland – production (tracks 1–4, 6–8, 10)
- Mark Taylor – production (tracks 1–4, 6–8, 10), mixing (all tracks)
- Paul Meehan – production (tracks 1–4, 6–8, 10)
- Andy Platts – production (track 5,11)
- Steve Robson – production (track 9)
- Matt Zara – production (track 12)
- Eg White – production (track 13)
- Tom Oxley – photography
- Martin O'Neill – sleeve illustration

== Charts ==
Chart (2025)	Peak position
Belgian Albums (Ultratop Flanders)	127
Swiss Albums (Schweizer Hitparade)	63
UK Albums (Official Charts)	5
