= Get to You =

Get to You may refer to:

- "Get to You" (James Morrison song), a 2009 song by British pop singer James Morrison
- "Get to You" (Michael Ray song), a 2017 song by American country music singer Michael Ray
- "Get to You", a song in 5/4 time signature on the Byrds' 1968 album The Notorious Byrd Brothers
- "Get to You" (Dan Reed Network song), a 1988 single by American band Dan Reed Network
