= Adam James =

Adam James may refer to

- Adam James (actor) (born 1972), British actor
- Adam James (singer), Australian country singer

== See also ==
- James Adam (disambiguation)
