= Nina Woodford =

Swedish/American song writer

Nina Woodford-Wells is a Swedish-American songwriter.

== Career ==
Nina Woodford (born 13 July 1979) Stockholm, is the daughter of the Swedish music producer Sten Sandahl, and the Black American social anthropologist Prudence Woodford-Berger. At the age of 16, she began her career singing backing vocals for Swedish artists Eric Gadd, Titiyo, and The Navigators. She also featured on the Britney Spears album Oops!... I Did It Again. By the age of 20 she had a publishing deal as a songwriter with Murlyn Music in Stockholm.

At age 25, In 2004, she relocated to London where she accumulated over 130 writing and arrangement credits, establishing herself as a prominent figure in the UK's pop songwriting community.

Woodford wrote the European Hot 100 #1 smash hit, Broken Strings, by James Morrison from his album Songs for You, Truths for Me. The song is the biggest single of Morrison's career.

Woodford co-wrote "Get Over You" by Sophie Ellis-Bextor, which peaked at number 3 in 2002, and has contributed to numerous releases by major artists including Britney Spears, Christina Milian, and The Wanted.

Nina co-wrote the theme song for the 2019 Special Olympics, titled "Right Where I'm Supposed To Be", which was executive produced by Quincy Jones.

Nina was asked by Sesame Street in 2021 to compose a song honoring Juneteenth, a federal holiday in the United States commemorating the emancipation of African-American slaves.

She has also written for Leona Lewis, Idina Menzel, Tom Jones, Sugababes, The Saturdays, and Jay Sean.

Woodford noted that Kate Bush "makes me feel free to dare to try different things.".

== Personal life ==
Nina grew up in Stockholm's Södermalm borough. Today she lives in Los Angeles and is married to record producer Greg Wells. They lost their home in January 2025 during the Palisades Fire.

== Honours ==
In 2010, Woodford was awarded the SKAP Stipendium by the Swedish Society of Popular Music Composers (SKAP), an organization dedicated to supporting Swedish popular music creators.

The award was presented at SKAP's ceremonial event on 6 December 2010 at F12 Salongen in Stockholm.

Also in 2010, Woodford was nominated at the Ivor Novello Awards for Most Performed Work category for "Broken Strings," performed by James Morrison featuring Nelly Furtado.
