= Get to You (James Morrison song) =

"Get To You"

Single by James Morrison

from the album Songs for You, Truths for Me (Deluxe Edition)
- Released: 16 November 2009
- Recorded: 2008
- Genre: Pop rock
- Length: 3:33
- Label: Polydor
- Songwriter(s): James Morrison; Fraser T Smith; Nina Woodford
- Producer(s): Mark Taylor

James Morrison singles chronology
"Nothing Ever Hurt Like You" (2009)	"Get To You" (2009)	"I Won't Let You Go" (2011)

"Get To You" is a song by British singer James Morrison, released on 16 November 2009 as the fifth overall single from the deluxe edition of his second studio album, Songs for You, Truths for Me. Despite the song peaking at number 104 on the UK Singles Chart, and having moderate success around the world, it was only released as a single in certain areas of Europe. The music video focuses on a couple who are trying to escape from a 'web of intrigue', where James is sitting in a square, observing at all times. When their partner arrives, they manage to escape from Morrison, who is chasing. The music video for the song premiered on Morrison's YouTube channel on 23 December 2009.

== Track listing ==
Digital download
No.	Title	Length
1.	"Get to You"	3:33

== Chart performance ==
Chart (2009)	Peak position
Belgium (Ultratip Bubbling Under Wallonia)	7
Netherlands (Dutch Top 40)	25
UK Singles (The Official Charts Company)	104
