= Jeremy McCoy =

American bass guitar player (born 1978)

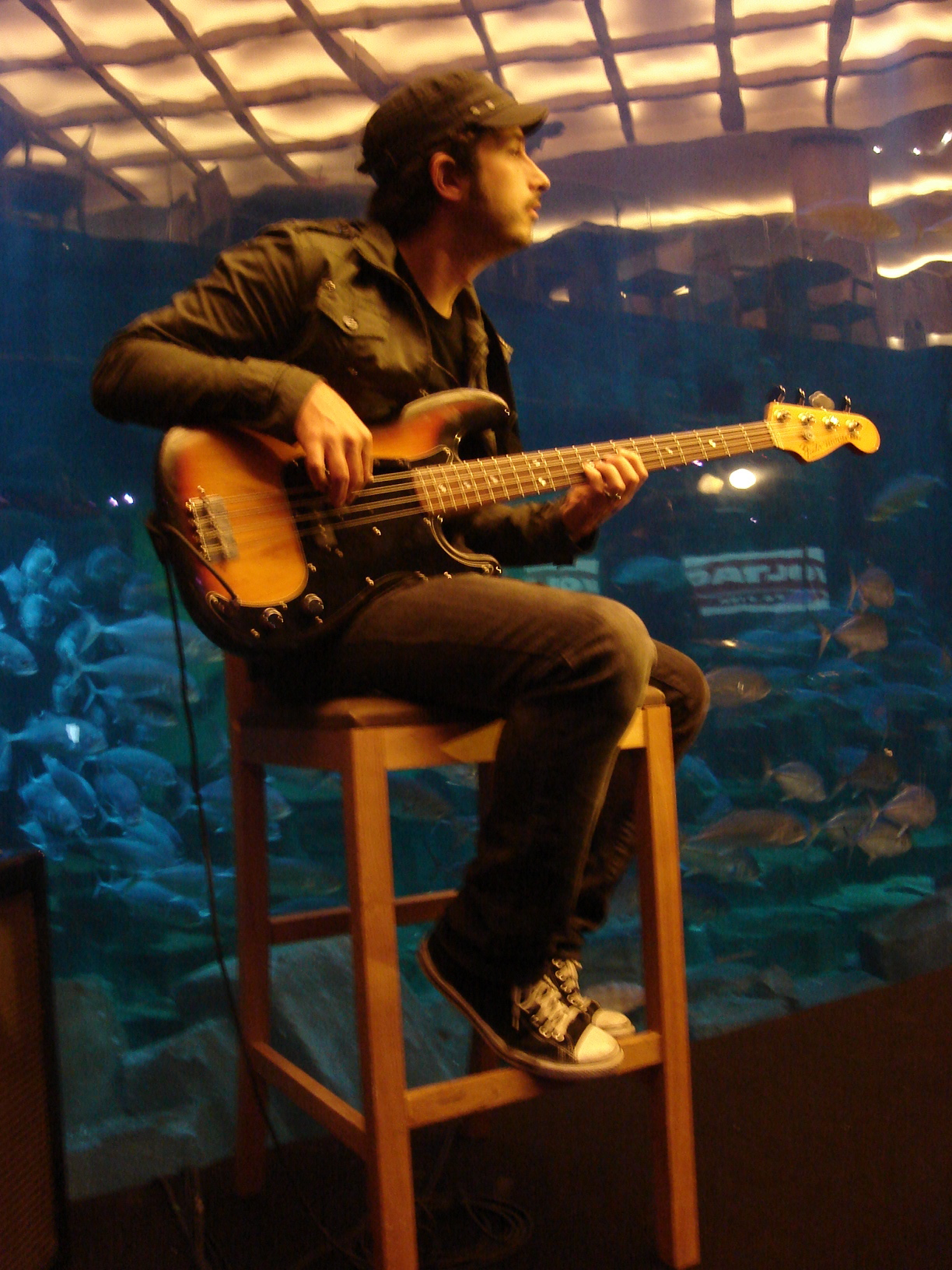

Background information
- Also known as: TheJBasser
- Born: January 19, 1978 (age 48)
- Genres: Rock
- Instruments: Bass, percussion
- Spouse: Darci (Stebbins) McCoy (from 2008)

Jeremy McCoy (born January 19, 1978) is an American bass guitar player, known for playing on the road and in the studio with several artists around the world.

== Beginning career ==
Born in Nashville, Tennessee, Jeremy spent his childhood and youth in the north-side suburban town of Gallatin. Jeremy's father, Larry McCoy moved the family there in the late 1970s, just before Jeremy was born, during his time playing piano for country music legend Johnny Cash. Jeremy started playing bass at 12 years old. He went on to play for the Gallatin High School performance band for 3 years. After high school, he traveled throughout the Western United States and in Europe playing bass with the inspirational group Up With People. From Fall - 1999 to Spring - 2000, Jeremy attended Lee University, where he played bass for the school's Campus Choir and was a member of Upsilon Xi. Jeremy left Lee University to play bass on the road with Gotee Recording artist Jeff Deyo from 2001 to 2006. During this time, Jeremy recorded bass on Jeff's "Saturate", "Light", and "Surrender" records. He has also done tours with Christian recording artists Rebecca St. James and Vicky Beeching.

== Recent career ==
In November 2008, Jeremy began traveling with Interscope Recordsl recording artist OneRepublic. Jeremy would play bass for Brent Kutzle when Brent moved to Cello during the live performances. As of February 2009, Jeremy is playing bass on the road with Epic Records artists The Fray. With The Fray, Jeremy has made television appearances on the Late Show with David Letterman, The Tonight Show with Jay Leno, The Tonight Show with Conan O'Brien, The Ellen DeGeneres Show, Good Morning America, Today (NBC program), and Late Night with Jimmy Fallon. Jeremy has also toured and/or recorded for other artists including - Kelly Clarkson, Mat Kearney, James Morrison, and James Blunt.

== Discography ==
=== With Jeff Deyo (Gotee Records) ===
- Saturate (March 26, 2002) - All Tracks
- Light (February 10, 2003) - All Tracks
- Surrender (August 8, 2005) Live album - All Tracks

=== With James Morrison (Polydor Records) ===
- Songs for You, Truths for Me (2008) - Track 4, "Please Don't Stop The Rain"

=== With OneRepublic (Interscope Records) ===
- iTunes exclusive "Hit 3 Pack: Stop and Stare - Video EP (The Stripped Sessions)" (2008) - Tracks 2 and 3

=== With Jonathan Lee (1CN Records) ===
- Let Them Hear (2009) - All Tracks

== Writing credits ==
- Saturate (March 26, 2002) - "Let it Flow", "You Are Good"
- Light (February 10, 2003) - "Take Me To You", "Show The Wonder"
