= Slave to the Music (James Morrison song) =

Single by James Morrison

from the album The Awakening
- B-side: "The Person I Should Have Been"
- Released: 20 February 2012
- Recorded: 2011
- Genre: Soul
- Length: 3:23
- Label: Island
- Songwriters: James Morrison; Toby Gad
- Producer: Toby Gad

James Morrison singles chronology
"Up" (2011)	"Slave to the Music" (2012)	"One Life" (2012)

"Slave to the Music" is a song by British singer-songwriter James Morrison, released as the third single from his third studio album, The Awakening. The single was due for release on 20 February 2012 in the United Kingdom, however, the song received an advanced release on 5 August 2011 in the Netherlands. The music video was uploaded to Morrison's official YouTube account on 19 August 2011 and included on the bonus DVD contained within the Tesco deluxe edition of The Awakening.

== Background ==
In an interview for Digital Spy, James described the track:

"Slave to the Music' is one where when I finished writing it, I thought it was pretty cool. It's the first song that I've written where I can imagine it getting played in a club. Normally I would never imagine any of my songs getting played in a club! So that was a first for me."

== Critical reception ==
Allmusic's Jon O'Brien perceived that "only on the funky R&B beats and Michael Jackson-esque chorus of "Slave to the Music," where Morrison begins to show some of the invention that was allegedly so heavily restricted on his previous effort." Pip Elwood wrote for "Entertainment Focus" that the song is a "standout track, where Morrison explores deeper rhythms."

== Chart performance ==
The song debuted at the Dutch Top 40 chart, at number fifty-four. In the second week, it climbed to number twenty-one. In the third week, it climbed again to number nineteen. In the fourth week, it reached number fifteen, where it stayed for another week. In the sixth week, it peaked at number nine. Later, it fell to number seventeen and in the last week, it fell to number twenty-two.

== Track listing ==
Digital download
No.	Title	Length
1.	"Slave to the Music"	3:23
2.	"The Person I Should Have Been"	4:03
3.	"Slave to the Music" (Music Video)

CD single
No.	Title	Length
1.	"Slave to the Music"	3:23
2.	"The Person I Should Have Been"	4:03

== Charts ==
=== Weekly charts ===
Chart (2011)	Peak position
Belgium (Ultratip Bubbling Under Flanders)	7
Belgium (Ultratip Bubbling Under Wallonia)	2
France (SNEP)	90
Netherlands (Dutch Top 40)	10
Netherlands (Single Top 100)	9

=== Year-end charts ===
Chart (2011)	Position
Netherlands (Dutch Top 40)	45
Netherlands (Single Top 100)	53

== Release history ==
Country	Release date	Format	Label
Netherlands	5 August 2011	Digital download	Island Records
Germany	17 February 2012	CD single	Island Records
United Kingdom	20 February 2012	Digital download	Island Records
