= Nothing Ever Hurt Like You =

Single by James Morrison

from the album Songs for You, Truths for Me
- Released: 15 November 2008
- Recorded: 2007–2008
- Genre: Pop rock
- Length: 3:53
- Label: Polydor
- Songwriter(s): James Morrison; Paul Barry; Mark Taylor
- Producer(s): Mark Taylor

James Morrison singles chronology
"Please Don't Stop the Rain" (2009)	"Nothing Ever Hurt Like You" (2008)	"Get to You" (2009)

"Nothing Ever Hurt Like You" is a song written by James Morrison, teaming up with Paul Barry and Mark Taylor. The single, released in the U.S. only on 2008, is listed on his second major studio album Songs for You, Truths for Me, which has been available for U.K. purchase since 29 September via Polydor. The song enjoyed modest success in the U.S. thanks to AAA Radio, in which the song remained in the Top 20 for most of 2009, peaking at number 1 on the chart. The song was released as the UK fourth single from the album in July.

== Music video ==
A music video in support of James Morrison's "Nothing Ever Hurt Like You" made its world premiere on 15 November 2008. The video features him performing the new track with his band in a studio with huge lamps illuminating the room from the background.

== Charts ==
=== Weekly charts ===
Chart (2008)	Peak position
U.S. Billboard Triple A Songs	3

Chart (2009)	Peak position
Netherlands (Dutch Top 40)	9
Netherlands (Single Top 100)	37

=== Year-end charts ===
Chart (2009)	Position
Netherlands (Dutch Top 40)	50

=== All-time charts ===
Chart (1995–2021)	Position
US Adult Alternative Songs (Billboard)	79
