= Please Don't Stop the Rain =

2009 single by James Morrison

"Please Don't Stop The Rain"

Single by James Morrison

from the album Songs for You, Truths for Me
- Released: 30 March 2009
- Genre: Pop rock
- Length: 3:54
- Label: Polydor
- Songwriter(s): James Morrison; Ryan Tedder

James Morrison singles chronology
"Broken Strings" (2008)	"Please Don't Stop The Rain" (2009)	"Nothing Ever Hurt Like You" (2009)

"Please Don't Stop The Rain" is the eighth single by James Morrison, and the third from his second album, Songs for You, Truths for Me (2008). Morrison co-wrote the song with Ryan Tedder, from OneRepublic, who also sings backing vocals. The single was released on 30 March 2009.

== Track listing ==
- Digital download
1. "Please Don't Stop The Rain" (Live From Air Studios) – 3:54
2. "Please Don't Stop The Rain" – 3:56
- German CD single
1. "Please Don't Stop The Rain" (Radio Edit)
2. "Once When I Was Little" (Live From Air Studios)

== Music video ==
The music video for "Please Don't Stop The Rain" is available to view on Morrison's official YouTube channel. It begins with Morrison walking in a hilly area. Half-way through the chorus, Morrison is suddenly walking through fog, with sparks 'raining' down upon him. This happens for the rest of the song, joined with several shots of a husky running around in the same foggy conditions.

== Critical reception ==
Mayer Nissim from digitalspy gave a mixed review for the single and gave 2 out of 5 stars. He wrote, "The third single from James Morrison's platinum-selling second album Songs For You, Truths For Me doesn't stray too far from the template of his previous releases. Morrison's voice is fine enough and the production sounds sleek and expensive, but unfortunately the music itself is quite unmemorable. Please Don't Stop The Rain' begins with a Coldplay-esque piano riff and an anaemic melody that improves little by the time it reaches the chorus. You're forced to look to the lyrics for a reason to keep listening, but the earnestness of each clumsy metaphor quickly tries the patience ("I can see the skies are changing, no longer shades of blue" [sic]). Morrison's pleasingly gruff tones deserve some decent writing to tease them out, but sadly this isn't up to the job".

== Charts ==
In the United Kingdom, "Please Don't Stop The Rain" entered the charts at number 68, rising to 39 two weeks later. On the issue dated 19 April 2009, the song rose to #33, and the following week, it started to fall, going down to #34. The week after, the song fell to #42. However, despite not reaching the commercial success of previous singles, it has become a big radio hit in Britain.

Chart (2009)	Peak Position
Belgium (Ultratip Bubbling Under Wallonia)	5
Dutch Top 40	20
Ireland (IRMA)	44
Switzerland (Schweizer Hitparade)	51
UK Singles (OCC)	33
