= Up (James Morrison song) =

Single by James Morrison featuring Jessie J

from the album The Awakening
- Released: 16 November 2011
- Recorded: 2010–11
- Genre: Pop
- Length: 3:38
- Label: Island
- Songwriters: James Morrison, Toby Gad
- Producer: Mark Taylor

James Morrison singles chronology
"I Won't Let You Go" (2011)	"Up" (2011)	"Slave to the Music" (2012)

Jessie J singles chronology
"Who You Are" (2011)	"Up" (2011)	"Laserlight" (2012)

"Up" is the second single released by singer-songwriter James Morrison from his third studio album, The Awakening. The song is a duet with English singer and songwriter Jessie J. The song was written by Morrison, Toby Gad and produced by Mark Taylor, who helmed Morrison's previous hook up with a female vocal partner Nelly Furtado, "Broken Strings". The single has peaked at number 30 in UK Singles Chart.

== Background ==
Though the first person Morrison himself thought of for the duet was Adele, it was his longstanding A&R man, Colin Barlow who actually suggested the collaboration with Jessie J. "Not that I was doubting Jessie's ability in any way," the singer said, "But I was worried whether she was the right character for the song. She got in the booth and did all this stuff that was amazing – she is a ridiculously good singer, so in tune she's like Autotune. I wanted to tap into the side of her character that is just a normal girl. I was like, you're a Ferrari, Jessie, you're in fifth gear – take it down to third. In the end it worked amazingly: she sang the chorus the way I should've sung it!"

== Composition ==
Lyrically, the song was inspired by Morrison's strained relationship with his late father, Paul. He died in 2010 from heart failure after a protracted and painful battle with alcoholism. "It was basically me saying to him: 'I'm not going to put up with your s--t, but I want you to know you have got the strength to turn it around for yourself' the singer said. "I didn't explain any of that to Jessie, though – I'd only just met her. We just focused on her delivering a s--t-hot vocal."

== Critical reception ==
Lewis Corner of Digital Spy gave the song a negative review stating, "Hoping to continue his streak of success, the Rugby-born crooner has called upon the services of diva-du-jour Jessie J for his new single. Morrison pleas in his distinct gravelly tones before giving way to a run of Jessie J ad-libbing that yo-yos faster than an Alton Towers rollercoaster. That said, when it's put against a dreary backdrop of weeping guitars and a melancholy beat, the result is about as tedious as those pesky theme park queues. As such, there's an agonising sense of anticipation, but it just doesn't go anywhere fast." The soft-focus pop soul duet with Jessie J is simply a repeat run of his collaboration with Nelly Furtado, right down to the lack of chemistry between the two singers. Meanwhile, producer Bernard Butler is content to keep things slick, smooth, safe and sellable."

== Music video ==
Jessie J and Morrison in the music video for 'Up'.

The music video was directed by Phil Griffin and was premiered on 15 October 2011. The video follows James Morrison wandering his way through an abandoned-looking building, visiting Jessie J at her top-floor apartment and finally both of them end the song singing on the rooftop. The duo performed the song together at Children in Need Rocks Manchester in 2011. They also performed the song live at Wembley arena on Strictly Come Dancing's results show.

== Track listing ==
Digital download
No.	Title	Length
1.	"Up" (featuring Jessie J)	3:38
2.	"Up" (Live from Metropolis Studios)	3:51
3.	"Lithium" (BBC Radio 1 Live Lounge Session)	4:04
4.	"Come Back to Me"	3:28

CD single
No.	Title	Length
1.	"Up" (featuring Jessie J)	3:38
2.	"Up" (Live from Metropolis Studios)	3:51

== Charts ==
Chart (2011)	Peak position
Austria (Ö3 Austria Top 40)	24
Belgium (Ultratip Bubbling Under Flanders)	4
Belgium (Ultratip Bubbling Under Wallonia)	4
Germany (GfK)	19
Netherlands (Single Top 100)	70
Switzerland (Schweizer Hitparade)	37
UK Singles (OCC)	30

== Release history ==
Region	Date	Label	Format
United Kingdom	16 November 2011	Island Records	Digital download
Germany	13 January 2012	Universal Records	CD single
