= I Won't Let You Go (James Morrison song) =

2011 single by James Morrison

Single by James Morrison

from the album The Awakening
- B-side: "Right by Your Side"
- Released: 25 August 2011 (Belgium); 16 September 2011 (Germany)
- Recorded: 2011
- Genre: Pop rock; soul
- Length: 3:49
- Label: Island
- Songwriters: James Morrison; Steve Robson; Martin Brammer
- Producer: Mark Taylor

James Morrison singles chronology
"Get to You" (2009)	"I Won't Let You Go" (2011)	"Up" (2011)

Music video
- "James Morrison - I Won't Let You Go (Official Video)" on YouTube

"I Won't Let You Go" is a song by British singer James Morrison. The song was released as the first single from his third studio album, The Awakening. The song was first released on 25 August 2011, with the first country receiving a release being Belgium. According to Songfacts, Morrison wrote the mid-tempo ballad about Gill, his long-term girlfriend and the mother of his daughter. The song was used as a promo for the 2012 season of Home and Away.

== Critical reception ==
Robert Copsey of Digital Spy gave the song an average review stating: ""Take a little time to hold yourself/ Take a little time to feel around," he insists in his unmistakable gruff tones, before the lilting guitars and gentle piano riff shift gear for the swaying, '60s slow-dance chorus. Truth be told there are more adventurous songs in his catalogue, but given his situation, we'd be inclined to play it safe too."

Jon O'Brien wrote for AllMusic that ""I Won't Let You Go" follows the same heartfelt, acoustic, tearjerker template as his previous two lead singles;." Pip Elwood wrote a positive review for "Entertainment Focus", stating that "The album’s lead single is a progression from Morrison’s usual sound. The stripped-back song is a heart-wrenching track with a passionate vocal from Morrison."

== Chart performance ==
The song debuted at number five on the UK Singles Chart, becoming his third top-five hit and biggest hit since "Broken Strings" (2008). In the second week, the song dropped only one spot, falling to number six. Elsewhere in Europe, the song attained a lot of success. On the Austrian Singles Chart, the song was Morrison's first number-one single, surpassing his previous peak of number two, with the song "Broken Strings". In Australia, the song reached 13, Morrison's first appearance in the top 20 since "You Give Me Something" which reached number 7 in 2006.

== Music video ==
A music video to accompany the release of "I Won't Let You Go" was first released onto YouTube on 4 August 2011 at a total length of three minutes and fifty-nine seconds. The video was shot at Wimbledon Studios, and directed by Phil Griffin. In the clip, Morrison wakes up to an empty bed, while somewhere in the city, his loved one is lying alone in the middle of the street. When he runs into her, he quickly offers his comfort and lies beside her.

== Track listing ==
Digital download
No.	Title	Length
1.	"I Won't Let You Go"	3:49
2.	"Broken Strings" (Live at the iTunes Festival, London 2011)	5:29
3.	"Undiscovered" (Live at the iTunes Festival, London 2011)	4:04

CD single
No.	Title	Length
1.	"I Won't Let You Go"	3:49
2.	"Right by Your Side" (Live at Church Studios)	4:58

== Charts ==
=== Weekly charts ===
Weekly chart performance
Chart (2011–2012)	Peak position
Australia (ARIA)	13
Austria (Ö3 Austria Top 40)	1
Belgium (Ultratop 50 Flanders)	36
Belgium (Ultratop 50 Wallonia)	49
Finland (Suomen virallinen lista)	20
Germany (GfK)	11
Ireland (IRMA)	11
Italy (FIMI)	4
Japan (Japan Hot 100)	25
Norway (VG-lista)	8
Romania (UPFR)	76
Scottish Singles Sales (Official Charts)	5
Sweden (Sverigetopplistan)	42
Switzerland (Schweizer Hitparade)	3
UK Singles (Official Charts)	5

=== Year-end charts ===
Annual chart rankings
Chart (2011)	Position
Austria (Ö3 Austria Top 40)	41
Germany (Official German Charts)	91
Italy (Musica e dischi)	28
Switzerland (Schweizer Hitparade)	44
UK Singles (OCC)	100

Chart (2012)	Position
Australia (ARIA)	41

== Certifications ==
Certifications and sales
Region	Certification	Certified units/sales
Australia (ARIA)	4× Platinum	280,000^{‡}
Germany (BVMI)	Gold	150,000^{‡}
Italy (FIMI)	Platinum	30,000^{*}
New Zealand (RMNZ)	Platinum	30,000^{‡}
Sweden (GLF)	Platinum	40,000^{‡}
United Kingdom (BPI)	Platinum	600,000^{‡}
^{*} Sales figures based on certification alone.^{‡} Sales+streaming figures based on certification alone.

== Release history ==
Country	Release date	Format	Label
Belgium	August 25, 2011	Digital download	Island Records
Ireland	September 16, 2011	Digital download	Island Records
Germany	September 16, 2011	CD single	Island Records
United Kingdom	September 18, 2011	Digital download	Island Records

== Other versions ==
In 2013, Australian singer Taylor Henderson recorded a version for his album Taylor Henderson.

In April 2012, Daniel Evans, a finalist on The X Factor UK released an acoustic version on his YouTube channel. It also featured on his 2013 album Wicked Game.
