= Songs for You, Truths for Me =

Studio album by James Morrison
- Released: 29 September 2008
- Genres: Pop rock; soft rock; blue-eyed soul
- Length: 45:44
- Label: Polydor
- Producers: Eg White; Steve Robson; John Shanks; Mark Taylor; Ryan Tedder; Martin Terefe

James Morrison chronology
Undiscovered (2006)	Songs for You, Truths for Me (2008)	Live from Air Studios, London (2009)

Singles from Songs for You, Truths for Me
- 1. "You Make It Real" Released: 22 September 2008; 2. "Broken Strings" Released: 8 December 2008; 3. "Please Don't Stop the Rain" Released: 30 March 2009; 4. "Nothing Ever Hurt Like You" Released: 23 July 2009 (UK & Europe); 5. "Get to You" Released: 16 November 2009

Professional ratings
Review scores
Source	Rating
AllMusic	3.5/5 stars
Artistdirect	4/5 stars
BBC Music	(Positive)
Digital Spy	2/5 stars
The Guardian	1/5 stars
MTV Asia	7/10
The Times	2/5 stars

Songs for You, Truths for Me is the second album by English singer, songwriter and guitarist James Morrison, released on 29 September 2008. The album was a commercial success in the UK where it entered the album charts at number three and in Ireland where it topped the charts. It has been certified triple Platinum by the British Phonographic Industry.

== Album information ==
On 29 September 2008, Morrison's second album entitled Songs for You, Truths for Me was released. In the writing process for this album he worked with Dan Wilson, Ryan Tedder, Martin Terefe, Martin Brammer, Chris Braide, Mark Taylor and Steve Robson. The album also features a duet with Nelly Furtado entitled "Broken Strings", co-written with Fraser T Smith and Nina Woodford. From October 2008 until the end of the year Morrison has toured throughout Europe. When talking about the album at 4Music Presents, Morrison stated that the music had 'moved on' a lot from the first album but that not to the point where fans of his previous album wouldn't be able to 'get it'.

The album was re-released on 16 November 2009, featuring two brand new tracks: "On the Same Side" and "Get to You" (which was the first single of the re-issue of the album and was released on the same day) and a second disc, The Basement Sessions, with acoustic versions of six of his own songs and a Michael Jackson cover "Man in the Mirror".

== Chart performance ==
Songs for You, Truths for Me was released on the 12 September 2008. The album entered the UK Album Chart at number three, being held off the top two spots by new albums from the Kings Of Leon and Will Young. The album was not a huge success initially and dropped out of the top ten after three weeks. The album made a gradual descent down the chart until the release of the second single of the album, "Broken Strings". Following the success of the single, the album steadily rose back up the charts before jumping from number twenty-four back into the top ten, reaching number seven.

The album was a commercial success in Ireland as well. It entered the Irish Album Chart at number fourteen before dropping off the chart completely after a couple of weeks. Then, following the success of "Broken Strings" the album re-entered the chart at number seventy-three and rose through the charts until it leaped from number fourteen to number one, giving Songs for You, Truths for Me its first number one chart placing where it stayed for one week.

== Track listing ==
=== Original release ===
All tracks are written by James Morrison, additional writers are noted.

No.	Title	Additional writer(s)	Length
1.	"The Only Night"	Martin Terefe	3:37
2.	"Save Yourself"	Chris Braide, Steve Robson, Wayne Hector	3:01
3.	"You Make It Real"	Paul Barry	3:31
4.	"Please Don't Stop the Rain"	Ryan Tedder	3:54
5.	"Broken Strings" (featuring Nelly Furtado)	Fraser T Smith, Nina Woodford	4:10
6.	"Nothing Ever Hurt Like You"	Barry, Mark Taylor	3:51
7.	"Once When I Was Little"	Dan Wilson, Terefe	4:42
8.	"Precious Love"	John Shanks	3:37
9.	"If You Don't Wanna Love Me"	Martin Brammer, Steve Robson	4:15
10.	"Fix the World Up for You"	Brammer, Robson	3:35
11.	"Dream on Hayley"	Francis White	3:33
12.	"Love Is Hard"	Brammer, Robson	3:53
13.	"Sitting on a Platform" (bonus track)	White	3:05

Japanese bonus tracks
No.	Title	Additional writer(s)	Length
13.	"Movin' On"	Martin Terefe, Dan Wilson	3:50
14.	"Broken Strings" (featuring Ai)	Fraser T Smith, Nina Woodford	4:13

=== Deluxe edition CD+DVD ===
A deluxe edition of the album was released with an additional DVD on 24 November 2008.

All tracks are written by James Morrison, additional writers are noted.

Deluxe edition DVD: Live at Air Studios
No.	Title	Additional writer(s)	Length
1.	"Broken Strings"	Smith, Woodford
2.	"If You Don't Wanna Love Me"	Martin Brammer, Steve Robson
3.	"Once When I Was Little"	Wilson, Terefe
4.	"Please Don't Stop the Rain"	Tedder
5.	"Precious Love"	Shanks
6.	"Save Yourself"	Braide, Steve Robson, Hector
7.	"You Make It Real"	Barry

=== 2-disc deluxe edition ===
Another deluxe edition of the album was released on 16 November 2009, with two new songs on disc one, and a seven track disc with acoustic versions of Morrison songs, and a Michael Jackson cover version.

All tracks are written by James Morrison, additional writers are noted.

Disc one
No.	Title	Additional writer(s)	Length
1.	"The Only Night"	Terefe	3:37
2.	"Get to You"	Fraser T Smith, Nina Woodford	3:33
3.	"You Make It Real"	Barry	3:31
4.	"Broken Strings" (featuring Nelly Furtado)	Smith, Woodford	4:10
5.	"On the Same Side"	Steve Robson, Martin Brammer	4:07
6.	"Nothing Ever Hurt Like You"	Barry, Taylor	3:51
7.	"Please Don't Stop the Rain"	Tedder	3:54
8.	"Save Yourself"	Braide, Steve Robson, Hector	3:01
9.	"Once When I Was Little"	Wilson, Terefe	4:42
10.	"Precious Love"	Shanks	3:37
11.	"If You Don't Wanna Love Me"	Brammer, Steve Robson	4:15
12.	"Fix the World Up for You"	Brammer, Steve Robson	3:35
13.	"Dream on Hayley"	White	3:33
14.	"Love Is Hard"	Brammer, Steve Robson	3:53

Disc two: The Basement Sessions
No.	Title	Writer(s)	Length
1.	"You Make It Real" (acoustic version)	Morrison, Barry	3:45
2.	"Once When I Was Little" (acoustic version)	Morrison, Wilson, Terefe	5:03
3.	"If You Don't Wanna Love Me" (acoustic version)	Morrison, Brammer, Steve Robson	4:19
4.	"You Give Me Something" (acoustic version)	Morrison, White	4:40
5.	"Broken Strings" (acoustic version)	Morrison, Smith, Woodford	4:44
6.	"Wonderful World" (acoustic version)	Morrison, White	3:28
7.	"Man in the Mirror" (acoustic version)	Siedah Garrett, Glen Ballard	4:04

== Personnel ==
- James Morrison – vocals, guitars (1–4, 6, 7, 9–12), backing vocals (3, 11)
- Nikolaj Torp – acoustic piano (1), Hammond organ (1), additional keyboards (4)
- Steve Robson – keyboards (2, 9, 10), bass (2, 9, 10), drums (2), acoustic piano (12), melodica (12), percussion (12), glockenspiel (12)
- Paul Barry – Wurlitzer electric piano (3, 6), bass (3, 6)
- Ryan Tedder – acoustic piano (4), Rhodes electric piano (4)
- Mark Taylor – programming (5), percussion (6)
- Dan Wilson – acoustic piano (7), bass (7), backing vocals (7)
- Charles Judge – keyboards (8)
- John Shanks – keyboards (8), guitars (8), bass (8)
- Paul Beard – Hammond organ (10)
- Eg White – keyboards (11), guitars (11), Moog bass (11), drums (11), backing vocals (11)
- Martin Terefe – guitars (1, 7), bass (1), Wurlitzer electric piano (7)
- Luke Potashnick – guitars (2, 10, 12)
- Adam Phillips – guitars (3, 5, 6)
- Alex Smith – guitars (3, 5), bass (5), keyboards (6), percussion (6)
- Seton Daunt – additional guitars (4)
- Jeremy McCoy – bass (4)
- Arnulf Linder – bass (12), cello (12)
- Kristoffer Sonne – drums (1, 7)
- Ash Soan – drums (3, 5, 6)
- Eddie Fisher – drums (4)
- Jeff Rothschild – drums (8)
- Karl Brazil – drums (9, 10)
- Joaquin Betancourt – horn arrangements (1)
- José Luís Hernández – saxophones (1)
- Chris Farr – tenor saxophone (8)
- Greg Riley – tenor saxophone (8)
- Andy Ross – tenor saxophone (10)
- Amaury Perez – trombone (1)
- Neil Sidwell – trombone (6)
- Matt Colman – trombone (10)
- Alexander Abreu – trumpet (1)
- John Thirkell – trumpet (6)
- Matt Gallagher – trumpet (8)
- Mike Jarosz – trumpet (8)
- Dominic Glover – trumpet (10)
- Rita Ora – backing vocals (2, 10)
- Donovan Blackwood – backing vocals (3)
- Ayak Thiik – backing vocals (3)
- Nelly Furtado – vocals (5)
- Julia Tillman Waters – backing vocals (8)
- Maxine Waters Willard – backing vocals (8)

String sections

- Chris Elliott – string arrangements (2)
- Cliff Masterson – string arrangements (3)
- Mark Taylor – string arrangements (3)
- David Davidson – string arrangements (7, 11)
- Larry Gold – string arrangements (8)

The London Session Orchestra (Tracks 2, 3 & 9)

- Everton Nelson – string leader (2, 9)
- David Daniels – cello (3)
- Bruce White – viola (3)
- Perry Montague-Mason – violin (3)
- Emlyn Singleton – violin (3)

The Love Sponge Strings (Tracks 7 & 11)

- John Catchings – cello
- Kristin Wilkinson – viola (7)
- Monisa Angell – viola (11)
- David Angell – violin
- David Davidson – violin

String players (Track 8)

- Jennie Lorenzo – cello
- Ruth Frazier – viola
- Alexandra Leem – viola
- Ghislaine Fleischmann – violin
- Emma Kummrow – violin
- Luigi Mazzocchi – violin
- Charles Parker – violin
- Igor Szwec – violin
- Gregory Teperman – violin

Production

- Martin Terefe – producer (1, 7)
- Steve Robson – producer (2, 9, 10, 12)
- Mark Taylor – producer (3, 5, 6)
- Ryan Tedder – producer (4)
- John Shanks – producer (8)
- Eg White – producer (11)
- Shari Sutcliffe – project coordinator, music contractor
- Studio Fury – art direction, design
- Lee Strickland – photography
- James Morrison – liner notes
- Paul McDonald – management
- Kristie Young – management

Technical credits

- Naweed Ahmed – mastering at Whitfield Mastering (London, UK)
- Tom Elmhirst – mixing (1–3, 5–7, 9–12)
- Dyre Gormsen – recording (1, 7)
- Iain Hill – recording (1, 7)
- Jonathan Shakhovsky – engineer (2, 9, 10, 12)
- Alex Smith – recording (3, 5, 6)
- Ren Swan – recording (3, 5, 6)
- Mark Taylor – recording (3, 5, 6)
- Colin Heldt – engineer (4)
- Giuseppe Salvadori – engineer (4)
- Ryan Tedder – engineer (4)
- Neil Tucker – engineer (4)
- Richard Woodcraft – engineer (4)
- Ash Howes – mixing (4)
- John Nazario – recording (5)
- Jeff Rothschild – recording (8), mixing (8)
- Richard Flack – engineer (10, 12)
- Jose-Raul Varonay – additional recording (1)
- Baeho Bobby Shin – additional recording (7), string recording (11)
- Daniel Parry – mix assistant (1–3, 5–7, 9–12)
- Helen Atkinson – assistant engineer (4)
- Dave Hagen – assistant engineer (4)
- Douglas Lott – assistant engineer (4)
- Rob Haggett – Pro Tools editing (4)
- Lars Fox – Pro Tools editing (8)

== Charts ==
=== Weekly charts ===
Chart (2008)	Peak position
Australian Albums (ARIA)	21
Austrian Albums (Ö3 Austria)	26
Belgian Albums (Ultratop Flanders)	27
Belgian Albums (Ultratop Wallonia)	44
Danish Albums (Hitlisten)	17
Dutch Albums (Album Top 100)	11
French Albums (SNEP)	35
German Albums (Offizielle Top 100)	13
Irish Albums (IRMA)	1
Italian Albums (FIMI)	33
New Zealand Albums (RMNZ)	19
Spanish Albums (Promusicae)	55
Swedish Albums (Sverigetopplistan)	25
Swiss Albums (Schweizer Hitparade)	12
UK Albums (Official Charts)	3
US Billboard 200	49

=== Year-end charts ===
Chart (2008)	Position
French Albums (SNEP)	135
Swiss Albums (Schweizer Hitparade)	62
UK Albums (OCC)	51

== Certifications ==
Region	Certification	Certified units/sales
Denmark (IFPI Danmark)	Platinum	20,000^{‡}
Germany (BVMI)	Gold	100,000^{‡}
Netherlands (NVPI)	Gold	30,000^{^}
United Kingdom (BPI)	3× Platinum	900,000^{*}
^{*} Sales figures based on certification alone.^{^} Shipments figures based on certification alone.^{‡} Sales+streaming figures based on certification alone.

== Release history ==
Region	Date	Label	Format	Catalog
Europe	29 September 2008	Polydor	CD	178 375-5
United States	30 September 2008	Interscope	CD	B0012070-02
Brazil	7 October 2008	Universal	CD	602517837560
Japan	4 March 2009	Universal Japan	CD	UICP-1105
United Kingdom	16 November 2009	Polydor	2 CD	
Brazil	28 November 2009	Universal	2 CD	602527259161
United Kingdom	24 November 2008	Polydor	CD/DVD	
