= Demons (James Morrison song) =

Single by James Morrison

from the album Higher Than Here
- Released: 4 September 2015
- Genre: Pop; soul pop
- Length: 3:17
- Label: Island
- Songwriters: James Morrison; Jim Eliot; Mima Stilwell
- Producer: Jim Eliot

James Morrison singles chronology
"Beautiful Life" (2012)	"Demons" (2015)	"Stay Like This" (2015)

"Demons" is a song by English recording artist James Morrison. It was written by Morrison along with Mima Stilwell and Jim Eliot for his fourth studio album Higher Than Here (2015).

== Music video ==
The music video for the song begins with Morrison singing while lying on his back on a street in a London with a location identifiable as Choumet Road Peckham. A few seconds later, he gets up and continues singing while walking towards Bellenden Road, visiting The Victoria Inn on the corner of Choumet Road and Bellenden Road. He sees various people during his walk, each of them being manipulated by a doppelgänger of themselves with "demonic" white eyes. Midway through the video, it is revealed that Morrison was the victim of a hit-and-run car accident, implying that the protagonist is actually Morrison's ghost. In the last scene, Morrison returns to his unconscious self, still lying on the street and being resuscitated, and kneels down behind him. When he looks back up, his eyes have become demonic and he makes a "shhh!" sign.

The location of the incident is identifiable by a red dot on a hand-drawn map in chalk on the blackboard on the wall of the bar in The Victoria Inn.

The seven deadly sins appear throughout the video, spelt out in various ways:

- Greed: a capital G added with a felt-tip marker to a road sign for "Reed Street".
- Gluttony: spelt out by the labels of eight beer bottles lined up on a counter.
- Wrath: written on a blackboard using a drawing of a rat flanked by a capital W and a capital H.
- Sloth: on the name tag of a waitress and her demonic doppelgänger.
- Pride: painted in red on a wall by a graffiti artist and his demonic doppelgänger.
- Envy: a brand name on a TV set, using the same typography as Sony.
- Lust: a tattoo on a girl's arm (also worn by her demonic doppelgänger).

At 2:10 into the video, the graffiti artist's demonic doppelgänger snaps his fingers and the song stops for about 12 seconds (it resumes with a fade-in at 2:22). This makes the full video clock in at 3:33, rather than the 3:17 of the standard song - an apparent reference either to the Illuminati or to Choronzon, a demon figure in the Aleister Crowley-founded philosophical movement Thelema.

== Charts ==
=== Weekly charts ===
Chart (2015)	Peak position
Netherlands (Dutch Top 40)	29
Scotland Singles (OCC)	50
