= The Awakening (James Morrison album) =

Studio album by James Morrison
- Released: 23 September 2011
- Recorded: 2010–11
- Genres: Soul; pop
- Length: 46:24
- Label: Island
- Producer: Bernard Butler

James Morrison chronology
iTunes Festival: London (2011)	The Awakening (2011)	Higher Than Here (2015)

Singles from The Awakening
- 1. "I Won't Let You Go" Released: 16 September 2011; 2. "Up" Released: 16 November 2011; 3. "Slave to the Music" Released: 20 February 2012; 4. "One Life" Released: 26 March 2012

The Awakening is the third album by English singer, songwriter and guitarist James Morrison, it was released on 26 September 2011. "I Won't Let You Go" was the first single released from the album in the United Kingdom. The album was certified Gold in the United Kingdom just two weeks after release. The album has been certified platinum in the UK for sales over 300,000 copies and has sold 1,000,000 copies worldwide.

== Background ==
"It feels like the first album to me, like the other two were my practice shots and this is the real thing."

— James Morrison telling about his new album for "Music Week".

The Awakening is the first album by Morrison to be released with Island Records after he recently parted ways with Polydor, his label of six years. Three years in the making, the album is influenced by the death of his father, as well as Morrison’s own steps into parenthood. It also sees him form a new creative relationship with producer Bernard Butler, who has further advanced Morrison's foray into a classic but contemporary soul sound. "I don’t want to put across that, yeah, the album is about my dad, losing my dad; some of it is but the other half is this sense of being woken up to what I wanted to achieve," he said in the interview by Music Week. Meanwhile, speaking of the title itself, he told Blues & Soul: "I basically just wanted it to feel like a first album, in the sense of me having woken up as an artist and person – you know, I wanted to forget that Broken Strings kind of pop side of me a little bit. And so, with me having actually written a SONG called 'The Awakening', that title also just kind of neatly fitted the album TOO."

== Composition ==
"To me the album is positive. Even the songs about my dad are positive. I didn't want to write songs that were downer songs but I wanted to capture that fucking deep ache that I had from losing my dad because that was the most powerful emotion I've ever felt – apart from having a kid, which is harder to write about because it's happiness..."

— James Morrison telling about the inspiration for the album's songs.

Bernard Butler has produced 10 tracks on the album, with Mark Taylor helming the remaining two. Taylor was behind Morrison's "Broken Strings" (his biggest hit single to date). Taylor's tracks were the first two singles from the new album: "I Won't Let You Go" and "Slave to the Music". Co-writers include long-term collaborators Martin Brammer and Steve Robson, who have worked with Morrison since his debut, as well as Dan Wilson and Toby Gad. English singer-songwriter Jessie J is featured on the track "Up".

== Critical reception ==
Professional ratings
Review scores
Source	Rating
Allmusic	3/5 stars
BBC Music	(favorable)
Entertainment Focus	4/5 stars
Daily Express	(favorable)
The Observer	2/5 stars
The Independent	1/5 stars
The Scotsman	2/5 stars

Mike Diver wrote for BBC Music that "The Awakening is lacking the grandstanding moment it needs to elevate it above reserved recommendation." Diver also noted that "Morrison has a truly great album in him – he's the emotional baggage to craft it, should he let locked-away demons loose – but for the third time in a row, this isn't it." Jon O'Brien wrote for Allmusic that "lyrically, he's never been better, but until Morrison manages to infuse some of this raw honesty and emotion into his sound, he's always going to struggle to create that one great record that his impassioned and soulful voice deserves." Andy Gill wrote a negative review for The Independent, stating that "It's as if he's learnt the technical grammar and inflective vocabulary of soul-style singing, but isn't able to make it into a coherent language that actually unlocks the emotions." Ally Carnawalth wrote a mixed review for The Observer, stating that "Strings and expensive-sounding gloss are applied by producer Bernard Butler but unfortunately it's Duffy-era Butler, rather than the sweeping soul of his mid-90s David McAlmont collaborations." Fiona Shepherd wrote for The Scotsman that "The Awakening follows mildly in the throwback direction of Aloe Blacc, paying tribute initially to the classic string-soaked strains of Marvin Gaye but bottling it and blanding out as the album veers towards the middle-of-the-daytime-radio road. The soft-focus pop soul duet with Jessie J is simply a repeat run of his collaboration with Nelly Furtado, right down to the lack of chemistry between the two singers. Meanwhile, producer Bernard Butler is content to keep things slick, smooth, safe and sellable." Pip Elwood wrote a very positive review from Entertainment Focus, writing that "The Awakening will be one of the biggest-selling albums of 2011 and we suspect it'll match the success of his previous two albums. Morrison is in a niche of his own and appeals to a wide audience. His voice is incredible, his songs emotive and his music timeless. Whilst everyone else is busy jumping on a bandwagon James Morrison is happy to just be himself and for that we commend him."

== Singles ==
- "I Won't Let You Go" was released as the album's lead single on 16 September 2011. It also received an advance release in the Netherlands on 25 August.
- "Up", featuring vocals from Jessie J, was released as the album's second single on 16 November 2011. It was later released in Germany on 13 January 2012.
- "Slave to the Music" was released as the album's third single on 20 February 2012. The song also received an advance release in the Netherlands and the United States on 5 August 2011.
- A music video for the song "Right by Your Side" was released on Morrison's official VEVO account on 18 July 2011, prior to the release of the album and lead single.

== Chart performance ==
The album debuted at number-one on the UK Albums Chart. Morrison previously scored a number one with his 2006 debut Undiscovered. The album sold almost twice that of last week's number-one, Kasabian's Velociraptor!. In the second week, the album holds at number-one, despite strong competition early in the week from Surrey rockers You Me at Six.

== Track listing ==
No.	Title	Writer(s)	Producer(s)	Length
1.	"In My Dreams"	Morrison, Dan Wilson	Bernard Butler	4:44
2.	"6 Weeks"	Morrison, Martin Brammer, Steve Robson	Butler	3:13
3.	"I Won't Let You Go"	Morrison, Martin Brammer, Steve Robson	Mark Taylor	3:49
4.	"Up" (featuring Jessie J)	Morrison, Toby Gad	Taylor	3:38
5.	"Slave to the Music"	Morrison, Gad	Butler	3:23
6.	"Person I Should Have Been"	Morrison	Butler	3:46
7.	"Say Something Now"	Morrison, Brammer, Greg Kurstin	Butler	4:01
8.	"Beautiful Life"	Morrison, Brammer, Kurstin	Butler	2:42
9.	"Forever"	Morrison, Eg White, Fraser T. Smith	Butler	3:41
10.	"The Awakening"	Morrison, Wilson	Butler	5:10
11.	"Right by Your Side"	Morrison, Robson, Claude Kelly	Butler	4:59
12.	"One Life"	James Morrison, Gad	Butler	3:18
13.	"All Around the World" (bonus track)	Morrison, Martin Terefe	Butler	3:17

Japanese bonus track
No.	Title	Length
14.	"One Life" (Metropolis Studios Live)	3:33

US bonus track
No.	Title	Length
14.	"In My Dreams" (Acoustic Version)	3:34

Deluxe edition bonus DVD
No.	Title	Length
1.	"Slave to the Music" (music video)
2.	"I Won't Let You Go" (music video)
3.	"Man Behind the Music" (Documentary)

Digital deluxe edition
No.	Title	Length
14.	"Slave to the Music" (Live at the iTunes Festival, London 2011)	4:25
15.	"The Awakening" (Live at the iTunes Festival, London 2011)	6:06
16.	"Person I Should Have Been" (Live at the iTunes Festival, London 2011)	5:22
17.	"Right by Your Side" (Live at the iTunes Festival, London 2011)	5:22
18.	"In My Dreams" (Live at the iTunes Festival, London 2011)	5:18
19.	"Person I Should Have Been" (acoustic version)	4:56

== Charts ==
=== Weekly charts ===
Chart (2011)	Peak position
Australian Albums (ARIA)	9
Austrian Albums (Ö3 Austria)	5
Belgian Albums (Ultratop Flanders)	21
Belgian Albums (Ultratop Wallonia)	20
Canadian Albums (Billboard)	58
Danish Albums (Hitlisten)	17
Dutch Albums (Album Top 100)	7
Finnish Albums (Suomen virallinen lista)	43
French Albums (SNEP)	77
German Albums (Offizielle Top 100)	11
Greek Albums (IFPI)	14
Irish Albums (IRMA)	2
Italian Albums (FIMI)	13
New Zealand Albums (RMNZ)	29
Norwegian Albums (VG-lista)	8
Portuguese Albums (AFP)	25
Scottish Albums (Official Charts)	1
Spanish Albums (Promusicae)	37
Swedish Albums (Sverigetopplistan)	7
Swiss Albums (Schweizer Hitparade)	1
UK Albums (Official Charts)	1
US Billboard 200	49

=== Year-end charts ===
Chart (2011)	Position
Austrian Albums (Ö3 Austria)	53
Dutch Albums (Album Top 100)	70
German Albums (Offizielle Top 100)	70
Swiss Albums (Schweizer Hitparade)	30
UK Albums (OCC)	36

Chart (2012)	Position
Australian Albums (ARIA)	41
UK Albums (OCC)	169

== Certifications ==
Region	Certification	Certified units/sales
Australia (ARIA)	Gold	35,000^{^}
Austria (IFPI Austria)	Gold	10,000^{*}
Germany (BVMI)	Gold	100,000^{^}
New Zealand (RMNZ)	Gold	7,500^{‡}
United Kingdom (BPI)	Platinum	300,000^{^}
^{*} Sales figures based on certification alone.^{^} Shipments figures based on certification alone.^{‡} Sales+streaming figures based on certification alone.

== Release history ==
Region	Date	Label	Format
Belgium	23 September 2011	Island Records	CD, digital download
Ireland	23 September 2011	Island Records	CD, digital download
Netherlands	23 September 2011	Island Records	CD, digital download
France	26 September 2011	Island Records	CD, digital download
United Kingdom	26 September 2011	Island Records	CD, digital download
Australia	30 September 2011	Island Records	CD, digital download
New Zealand	3 October 2011	Island Records	CD, digital download
