= You Make It Real =

2008 single by James Morrison

Single by James Morrison

from the album Songs for You, Truths for Me
- Released: 22 September 2008
- Genre: Pop rock
- Length: 3:31
- Label: Polydor
- Songwriter(s): Paul Barry; James Morrison
- Producer(s): Mark Taylor

James Morrison singles chronology
"One Last Chance" (2007)	"You Make It Real" (2008)	"Broken Strings" (2008)

"You Make It Real" is the sixth single by English singer James Morrison, and the first from his second album, Songs for You, Truths for Me. The single was released on 22 September 2008; a week before the release of the album. The song was covered by Akon on the Live Lounge on BBC Radio 1. The song appeared on the international soundtrack to the Brazilian soap opera Três Irmãs, and on the soundtrack for the film, He's Just Not That Into You. It was also featured on a commercial for Overstock.com, as well as being featured on the first episode in Season 5 of the television programme Brothers and Sisters.

== Music video ==
The video was released in September and showed Morrison in places throughout Los Angeles. One shot shows the sign for the "110 Freeway" which runs through the Downtown Los Angeles area. The video begins with Morrison inside a cab and then shows him by a pool. After he arrives at a hotel, he sings on stage. The video also has shots of Morrison in a bar and coffee shop. The video ends with him walking alone.

== Formats and track listings ==
CD single

1. "You Make It Real"
2. "Sitting on a Platform"

Maxi-CD single

1. "You Make It Real" (Radio version)
2. "Sitting on a Platform"
3. "Movin' On"
4. "You Make It Real" (Live and acoustic)
5. "You Make It Real" (Video)

== Charts ==
=== Chart performance ===
The song debuted in the UK Singles Chart at number seven on 28 September 2008, giving Morrison his third top ten hit and it spent eight weeks in the chart. The song also broke in the top twenty of the Dutch Top 40, peaking at number eighteen. The song also appeared in the lower reaches of several European music charts

=== Weekly charts ===
Chart (2008–2009)	Peak position
Australia (ARIA)	100
Belgium (Ultratip Bubbling Under Flanders)	16
Belgium (Ultratip Bubbling Under Wallonia)	12
Germany (GfK)	71
Ireland (IRMA)	38
Netherlands (Dutch Top 40)	18
Netherlands (Single Top 100)	41
UK Singles (OCC)	7

=== Year-end charts ===
Chart (2008)	Position
Netherlands (Dutch Top 40)	88
UK Singles (OCC)	146

== Certifications ==
Region	Certification	Certified units/sales
Denmark (IFPI Danmark)	Gold	45,000^{‡}
New Zealand (RMNZ)	Gold	15,000^{‡}
United Kingdom (BPI)	Gold	400,000^{‡}
^{‡} Sales+streaming figures based on certification alone.
