= Adam James (singer) =

Indigenous Australian country singer

- Genres: Country
- Instrument: Vocals

Adam James is an Indigenous Australian country singer from Moreton Bay, Queensland, Australia. He is the host of Letterbox, a TV series broadcast on Fox and NITV. James won a Deadly in 2008 for Best New Talent and was a finalist at the 2008 Toyota Star Maker Quest in Tamworth.

== Discography ==
- Messages and Memories (2007)
- "Many Who Pretend"
- "The Country Singer" (2008)
- Children of the Sunrise (2010)
