= You're Stronger Than You Know =

Studio album by James Morrison
- Released: 8 March 2019
- Length: 45:38
- Label: Stanley Park
- Producer: Mark Taylor

James Morrison chronology
Higher Than Here (2015)	You're Stronger Than You Know (2019)	Fight Another Day (2025)

Singles from You're Stronger Than You Know
- 1. "My Love Goes On" Released: February 6, 2019; 2. "Power" Released: February 22, 2019; 3. "So Beautiful" Released: September 13, 2019

You're Stronger Than You Know is the fifth studio album by English singer-songwriter James Morrison. It was released by Stanley Park Records on 8 March 2019.

== Critical reception ==
Professional ratings
Review scores
Source	Rating
AllMusic	3.5/5 stars

AllMusic editor Neil Z. Yeung rated the album three and a half out of five stars. He found that "While much of the first half of the album is designed to spark warm fuzzies and butterflies, Morrison doesn't shy away from the messy, uncertain moments of life [...] Taking the wisdom from lessons learned in his hitherto thirtysomething years on Earth, Morrison pushes positivity and maturity with this simple and utterly relatable collection."

== Track listing ==
All lyrics are written by James Morrison.

You're Stronger Than You Know track listing
No.	Title	Music	Length
1.	"My Love Goes On" (featuring Joss Stone)	James Morrison; Paul Meehan; Josh Breaks	3:36
2.	"Brighter Kind of Love"	Morrison; Jonathan Quarmby; Fiona Bevan	3:24
3.	"So Beautiful"	Morrison; Gary Barlow; Steve Mac	4:03
4.	"Feels Like the First Time"	Morrison; Taylor; Patrick Mascall	4:13
5.	"Glorious"	Morrison; Nina Woodford; Busbee	3:24
6.	"Power"	Morrison; Eg White	4:09
7.	"Slowly"	Morrison; White	3:54
8.	"Ruins"	Morrison; Martin Brammer; Jon Green; Stephen Robson	3:42
9.	"I Still Need You"	Morrison; Paul Barry; Taylor	4:39
10.	"Don't Wanna Lose You Now"	Morrison; Barry; Taylor	4:09
11.	"Cross the Line"	Morrison; White	2:59
12.	"Until the Stars Go Out"	Morrison; Barry; Taylor	3:26
Total length:			45:37

== Personnel ==
Credits adapted from Tidal.

- James Morrison – vocals, guitar
- Mark Taylor – production
- Rocco Palladino – bass
- Ash Soan – drums
- Adam Phillips – guitar
- Rich Milner – keyboards
- Martin Hollis – engineering
- Josh Tyrrell – studio assistance
- Rowan McIntosh – studio assistance
- Roger Rich – photography

== Charts ==
Chart (2019)	Peak position
Australian Digital Albums (ARIA)	48
Austrian Albums (Ö3 Austria)	52
Belgian Albums (Ultratop Flanders)	164
Dutch Albums (Album Top 100)	58
French Albums (SNEP)	120
German Albums (Offizielle Top 100)	37
Scottish Albums (OCC)	9
Spanish Albums (PROMUSICAE)	87
Swiss Albums (Schweizer Hitparade)	12
UK Albums (OCC)	14
