= Higher Than Here =

Studio album by James Morrison
- Released: 30 October 2015
- Length: 56:47 (deluxe) 45:03 (standard)
- Label: Island
- Producers: Tim Bran; Fred Cox; Jim Eliot; Jon Green; LL BLU; Roy Kerr; Malay; Reuben Morgan; MyRiot; Steve Robson; Jarrad Rogers; Martin Terefe

James Morrison chronology
The Awakening (2011)	Higher Than Here (2015)	You're Stronger Than You Know (2019)

Singles from Higher Than Here
- 1. "Demons" Released: 4 September 2015; 2. "Stay Like This" Released: 23 October 2015; 3. "I Need You Tonight" Released: 6 March 2016

Higher Than Here is the fourth studio album by English singer-songwriter James Morrison. It was released on 30 October 2015 by Island Records.

== Critical reception ==
Professional ratings
Review scores
Source	Rating
AllMusic	3/5 stars

AllMusic editor Neil Z. Yeung rated the album three out of five stars. He called Higher Than Here "a comforting collection of soul-folk tunes that is pleasing and enjoyable. Much like Morrison himself, the songs are likable. His voice still carries that gorgeous, husky grit, so full of smoky soul and yearning, most expertly executed on "Stay Like This" and "Just Like a Child." Elsewhere, he ventures into some OneRepublic/Script territory with the catchy hip-pop lead single "Demons"."

== Track listing ==
Standard version
No.	Title	Writer(s)	Producer(s)	Length
1.	"Demons"	James Morrison; Mima Stilwell; Jim Eliot	Eliot	3:18
2.	"Stay Like This"	Morrison; Francis White	Fred Cox	3:39
3.	"Heaven to a Fool"	Morrison; Martin Terefe; James Ryan Ho	Terefe; Malay	4:16
4.	"Right Here"	Morrison; Jarrad Rogers; Reuben Morgan	Tim Bran; Roy Kerr	3:51
5.	"Reach Out"	Morrison; Cox; Martin Brammer	Cox	3:14
6.	"We Can"	Morrison; White	Bran; Kerr	3:43
7.	"Too Late for Lullabies"	Morrison; Simon Aldred	Cox	4:16
8.	"Something Right"	Morrison; Jonny Lattimer	Cox	3:49
9.	"Easy Love"	Morrison; White	Bran; Kerr	3:36
10.	"I Need You Tonight"	Morrison; Mark Taylor; Paul Barry	Taylor	5:02
11.	"Just Like a Child"	Morrison; Martin Brammer; Steve Robson	Robson	3:17
12.	"Higher Than Here"	Morrison; Jon Green	Green	3:03

Deluxe version (bonus tracks)
No.	Title	Writer(s)	Producer(s)	Length
13.	"In the Shadow of a Dream"	Morrison; Aldred	Eliot	4:29
14.	"Naked With You"	Morrison; Tom Hull; Bran; Kerr	MyRiot	3:30
15.	"Lonely People" (iLL BLU featuring James Morrison)	Morrison; Darius Ellington Forde; James Grant; Brammer; Robson	iLL BLU	3:36

== Charts ==
Chart (2015)	Peak position
Australian Albums (ARIA)	94
Austrian Albums (Ö3 Austria)	33
Belgian Albums (Ultratop Flanders)	78
Belgian Albums (Ultratop Wallonia)	69
Dutch Albums (Album Top 100)	15
German Albums (Offizielle Top 100)	22
Irish Albums (IRMA)	45
Italian Albums (FIMI)	48
Scottish Albums (Official Charts)	8
Swiss Albums (Schweizer Hitparade)	3
UK Albums (Official Charts)	7
UK Album Downloads (Official Charts)	5

== Certifications ==
Region	Certification	Certified units/sales
United Kingdom (BPI)	Silver	60,000^{‡}
^{‡} Sales+streaming figures based on certification alone.
