= The Pieces Don't Fit Anymore =

Single by James Morrison

Single by James Morrison

from the album Undiscovered
- Released: 18 December 2006
- Recorded: 2006
- Genre: Chamber pop; soft rock
- Label: Polydor
- Songwriter(s): James Morrison; Martin Brammer; Steve Robson
- Producer(s): Steve Robson

James Morrison singles chronology
"Wonderful World" (2006/2007)	"The Pieces Don't Fit Anymore" (2006)	"Undiscovered" (2007)

"The Pieces Don't Fit Anymore" is a song by British singer James Morrison, from his debut album Undiscovered. It was released on 18 December 2006 as his third single.

The song is a break up/letting go song, with Morrison commentating that the song is an ode to a point in a relationship where "no matter what [you] try, it just does not seem to work out anymore".

The song appeared in the second episode of the fourth season of The O.C..

== Track listing ==
1. "The Pieces Don't Fit Anymore"
2. "Don't Close Your Eyes"

== Charts ==
Chart (2006)	Peak position
Dutch Top 40	30
UK Singles Chart	30
