= Wonderful World (James Morrison song) =

2006 single by James Morrison

Single by James Morrison

from the album Undiscovered
- Released: 23 October 2006
- Length: 3:30
- Label: Polydor
- Songwriter(s): James Morrison, Eg White
- Producer(s): Eg White

James Morrison singles chronology
"You Give Me Something" (2006)	"Wonderful World" (2006)	"The Pieces Don't Fit Anymore" (2006)

"Wonderful World" is the second single by British singer James Morrison. The song is the second to be released from his debut album, Undiscovered, which was released on 31 July 2006. The song peaked at number 8 on the UK singles chart in October, following the CD single release. A version appears on the 2007 compilation album The Saturday Sessions: The Dermot O'Leary Show.

== Track listing ==
2-track single

1. "Wonderful World" – 3:30
2. "My Uprising" – 3:44

CD-Maxi

1. "Wonderful World" – 3:30
2. "You Give Me Something" (Live in Tokyo) – 3:41
3. "Better Man – 3:51
4. "Wonderful World" (Video)

== Music video ==
The music video shows James Morrison sitting by a swimming pool with his guitar with many beautiful women sunbathing by a mansion. The video then goes on to reveal that the seemingly ideal life going on is just an illusion – the women in fact are in a mental ward.

== Charts ==
=== Weekly charts ===
Chart (2006–07)	Peak position
Austria (Ö3 Austria Top 40)	57
Belgium (Ultratop 50 Flanders)	40
Belgium (Ultratop 50 Wallonia)	31
France (SNEP)	29
Germany (GfK)	87
Netherlands (Dutch Top 40)	8
Netherlands (Single Top 100)	18
New Zealand (Recorded Music NZ)	16
Romania (Romanian Top 100)	67
Switzerland (Schweizer Hitparade)	35
UK Singles (OCC)	8

=== Year-end charts ===
Chart (2006)	Position
UK Singles (OCC)	135
Chart (2007)	Position
Netherlands (Dutch Top 40)	54

== Certifications ==
Region	Certification	Certified units/sales
Denmark (IFPI Danmark)	Gold	4,000^{^}
United Kingdom (BPI)	Gold	400,000^{‡}
^{^} Shipments figures based on certification alone.^{‡} Sales+streaming figures based on certification alone.
