= Undiscovered (song) =

Single by James Morrison

from the album Undiscovered
- Released: (United Kingdom) 12 March 2007
- Recorded: 2006
- Genre: Pop rock
- Length: 3:29
- Label: Polydor
- Songwriter(s): James Morrison; Martin Brammer; Steve Robson
- Producer(s): Steve Robson

James Morrison singles chronology
"The Pieces Don't Fit Anymore" (2006/2007)	"Undiscovered" (2007)	"One Last Chance" (2007)

"Undiscovered" is a song written by British singer James Morrison, Martin Brammer, Steve Robson and performed by Morrison. The song appears on Morrison's debut album Undiscovered and was released as his fourth single on 12 March 2007. "Undiscovered" was featured in the soundtrack for She's Out of My League.

== Track listing ==
iTunes UK Download

1. "Undiscovered" (Live In Tokyo)

== Charts ==
Chart (2007)	Peak position
Belgium Tip Chart (Flanders)	18
Belgium Tip Chart (Wallonia)	13
Dutch Top 40	30
UK Singles Chart	63
