= Undiscovered (James Morrison album) =

Studio album by James Morrison
- Released: 10 July 2006
- Recorded: 2006
- Genre: Pop; soul
- Length: 51:07
- Label: Polydor
- Producer: Jimmy Hogarth; Steve Robson; Martin Terefe; Eg White

James Morrison chronology
Undiscovered (2006)	Songs for You, Truths for Me (2008)

Singles from Undiscovered
- 1. "You Give Me Something" Released: 17 July 2006; 2. "Wonderful World" Released: 16 October 2006; 3. "The Pieces Don't Fit Anymore" Released: 18 December 2006; 4. "Undiscovered" Released: 12 March 2007; 5. "One Last Chance" Released: 2 July 2007

Professional ratings
Review scores
Source	Rating
AllMusic	3.5/5 stars
BBC Music	(Mixed)
Billboard	(Positive)
Entertainment Weekly	(B)
The Guardian	2/5 stars
PopMatters	(4/10)
Yahoo! Music UK	6/10 stars

Undiscovered is the debut album by English singer-songwriter James Morrison, released in the United Kingdom on 10 July 2006. In its first week, the album sold 84,611 units in the UK, peaking atop the UK Albums Chart. The album also moderately entered the US Billboard 200 at number 24 on the chart. By the end of 2006, the album had sold 847,135 copies in the UK and certified multi-platinum; as of 2020, its total sales count was over 1,500,000 units.

The album saw commercial success in other countries: it has been certified platinum in Australia and Ireland. It was particularly successful in New Zealand, where the first single off the album, "You Give Me Something", reached number one and the album was certified gold. Lyrically, Undiscovered discusses romantic relationships, heartache, and biographical coming-of-age scenarios.

== Album information ==
When James Morrison was in New Zealand, and appeared on the New Zealand Idol show, the two finalists asked Morrison about the meaning behind the song "You Give Me Something", and Morrison said that it was intended to be a 'harsh love song', and the lyrics mean that the protagonist of the song does not love the person as much as she loves him, but is willing to give the relationship a try.

Several of the album's songs were featured in TV shows. The album's lead single, "You Give Me Something", appeared in an episode of American television series Ugly Betty, an episode of Doctor Who, and a promo for FX. The song "This Boy" appeared in an episode of the CW show One Tree Hill (Series 4, Episode 17). The bonus track "Better Man" was played in an episode of What About Brian and in an episode of Grey's Anatomy.

== Track listing ==
Standard version
No.	Title	Writer(s)	Producer(s)	Length
1.	"Under the Influence"	James Morrison; Jimmy Hogarth; Steve McEwan	Martin Terefe	4:07
2.	"You Give Me Something"	Morrison; Francis White	Eg White	3:33
3.	"Wonderful World"	Morrison; White	Terefe	3:30
4.	"The Pieces Don't Fit Anymore"	Morrison; Martin Brammer; Steve Robson	Robson	4:17
5.	"One Last Chance"	Morrison; Tim Kellett; Kevin Andrews	Terefe	4:47
6.	"Undiscovered"	Morrison; Brammer; Robson	Robson	3:29
7.	"The Letter"	Morrison; Wayne Hector; David Frank	Terefe	3:14
8.	"Call the Police"	Morrison; White	Terefe	3:46
9.	"This Boy"	Morrison; Kellett	Terefe	3:54
10.	"If the Rain Must Fall"	Morrison; Terefe	Terefe	4:05
11.	"The Last Goodbye"	Morrison; Hogarth; McEwan	Terefe	5:12

UK version
No.	Title	Writer(s)	Producer(s)	Length
11.	"How Come"	Morrison; Hogarth; McEwan	Hogarth	3:26
12.	"The Last Goodbye"	Morrison; Hogarth; McEwan	Terefe	5:12
13.	"Better Man"	Morrison; Julian Gallagher; Kim Richie	Terefe	3:52

US version
No.	Title	Writer(s)	Producer(s)	Length
11.	"Better Man"	Morrison; Julian Gallagher; Kim Richie	Terefe	3:52
12.	"The Last Goodbye"	Morrison; Hogarth; McEwan	Terefe	5:12

Japanese iTunes version
No.	Title	Writer(s)	Producer(s)	Length
11.	"How Come"	James Morrison; Hogarth; McEwan	Hogarth	3:26
12.	"The Last Goodbye"	Morrison; Hogarth; McEwan	Terefe	5:12
13.	"My Uprising"	Morrison; Hogarth; McEwan	Hogarth	3:42
14.	"Better Man"	Morrison; Julian Gallagher; Kim Richie	Terefe	3:52

== Charts ==
=== Weekly charts ===
Chart (2006–07)	Peak position
Australian Albums (ARIA)	17
Austrian Albums (Ö3 Austria)	14
Belgian Albums (Ultratop Flanders)	28
Belgian Albums (Ultratop Wallonia)	15
Canadian Albums (Billboard)	81
Danish Albums (Hitlisten)	6
Dutch Albums (Album Top 100)	5
French Albums (SNEP)	9
German Albums (Offizielle Top 100)	13
Italian Albums (FIMI)	16
New Zealand Albums (RMNZ)	4
Norwegian Albums (VG-lista)	14
Portuguese Albums (AFP)	17
Swedish Albums (Sverigetopplistan)	10
Swiss Albums (Schweizer Hitparade)	15
UK Albums (OCC)	1
US Billboard 200	24

=== Year-end charts ===
Chart (2006)	Position
Dutch Albums (Album Top 100)	35
UK Albums (OCC)	10
Chart (2007)	Position
Belgian Albums (Ultratop Flanders)	95
Belgian Albums (Ultratop Wallonia)	65
Dutch Albums (Album Top 100)	28
French Albums (SNEP)	82
Swiss Albums (Schweizer Hitparade)	78
UK Albums (OCC)	23
Chart (2008)	Position
UK Albums (OCC)	185
Chart (2009)	Position
UK Albums (OCC)	109

== Certifications ==
Region	Certification	Certified units/sales
Australia (ARIA)	Platinum	70,000^{^}
Denmark (IFPI Danmark)	2× Platinum	40,000^{‡}
Europe (IFPI)	Platinum	1,000,000^{*}
Germany (BVMI)	Gold	100,000^{^}
Ireland (IRMA)	Platinum	15,000^{^}
Japan (RIAJ)	Gold	100,000^{^}
Netherlands (NVPI)	Platinum	70,000^{^}
New Zealand (RMNZ)	Gold	7,500^{^}
Switzerland (IFPI Switzerland)	Gold	15,000^{^}
United Kingdom (BPI)	5× Platinum	1,500,000^{^}
^{*} Sales figures based on certification alone.^{^} Shipments figures based on certification alone.^{‡} Sales+streaming figures based on certification alone.
