= You Give Me Something (James Morrison song) =

2006 single by James Morrison

Single by James Morrison

from the album Undiscovered
- B-side: "Is There Anybody Home?"; "Burns Like Summer Sun"
- Released: 17 July 2006
- Length: 3:33
- Label: Polydor
- Songwriters: James Morrison; Eg White
- Producer: Eg White

James Morrison singles chronology
"You Give Me Something" (2006)	"Wonderful World" (2006)

"You Give Me Something" is a song by English singer James Morrison, released on 17 July 2006 as his debut single. The song is featured on his 2006 debut album, Undiscovered. The single reached number one in New Zealand and charted within the top 10 in several nations, including Australia, the Netherlands, Switzerland, and the United Kingdom. The song was nominated for a BRIT Award in the category Best British Single Shortlist in 2007. This song was ranked number 100 on MTV Asia's list of the "Top 100 Hits of 2007".

== Meaning ==
When James Morrison was in New Zealand and appeared on New Zealand Idol, the two finalists asked Morrison what the meaning behind the song was, and Morrison said that it was intended to be a "harsh love song". The lyrics mean that the protagonist of the song does not love the person as much as she loves him, but is willing to give the relationship a try.

== Music videos ==
The music video takes place in a studio where Morrison is seated in a chair, surrounded by microphones while singing and playing guitar. His backing orchestra plays behind curtains that show only their shadows. Watching him are a woman with a lollipop, a group of girls skipping rope and a group of showgirls.

A second version of the video was released in early 2007. It features Morrison performing the song for pedestrians in New York City's Chinatown. It was filmed on the corner of Lafayette Street and Canal Street. A New York University bus is briefly visible in the background.

== Track listings ==
UK and European CD single

1. "You Give Me Something" – 3:36
2. "Is There Anybody Home?" – 3:57

UK 7-inch single

A. "You Give Me Something" – 3:36
B. "Burns Like Summer Sun" – 3:50

European maxi-CD single

1. "You Give Me Something" – 3:36
2. "Is There Anybody Home?" – 3:57
3. "Burns Like Summer Sun" – 3:50
4. James Morrison Playsoftware (videos and images)

Australian CD single

1. "You Give Me Something" – 3:36
2. "Is There Anybody Home?" – 3:57
3. "Burns Like Summer Sun" – 3:50
4. "You Give Me Something" (video)

== Charts ==
=== Weekly charts ===
Chart (2006–2007)	Peak position
Australia (ARIA)	7
Austria (Ö3 Austria Top 40)	8
Belgium (Ultratop 50 Flanders)	7
Belgium (Ultratop 50 Wallonia)	34
CIS Airplay (TopHit)	105
Europe (Eurochart Hot 100)	18
Germany (GfK)	31
Ireland (IRMA)	14
Italy (FIMI)	13
Netherlands (Dutch Top 40)	2
Netherlands (Single Top 100)	3
New Zealand (Recorded Music NZ)	1
Norway (VG-lista)	10
Russia Airplay (TopHit)	100
Scotland Singles (OCC)	7
Sweden (Sverigetopplistan)	25
Switzerland (Schweizer Hitparade)	4
UK Singles (OCC)	5
US Adult Pop Airplay (Billboard)	33
Venezuela Pop Rock (Record Report)	2

=== Year-end charts ===
Chart (2006)	Position
Australia (ARIA)	84
Netherlands (Dutch Top 40)	19
Netherlands (Single Top 100)	27
Switzerland (Schweizer Hitparade)	66
UK Singles (OCC)	25

Chart (2007)	Position
Belgium (Ultratop 50 Flanders)	64

== Certifications ==
Region	Certification	Certified units/sales
Brazil (Pro-Música Brasil)	Gold	30,000^{‡}
Denmark (IFPI Danmark)	Platinum	90,000^{‡}
New Zealand (RMNZ)	Platinum	30,000^{‡}
United Kingdom (BPI)	Platinum	600,000^{‡}
^{‡} Sales+streaming figures based on certification alone.

== Release history ==
Region	Date	Format(s)	Label(s)	Ref.
United Kingdom	17 July 2006	CD	Polydor	
Australia	23 October 2006	CD	Polydor	
