= James Morrison (singer) =

British singer (born 1984)

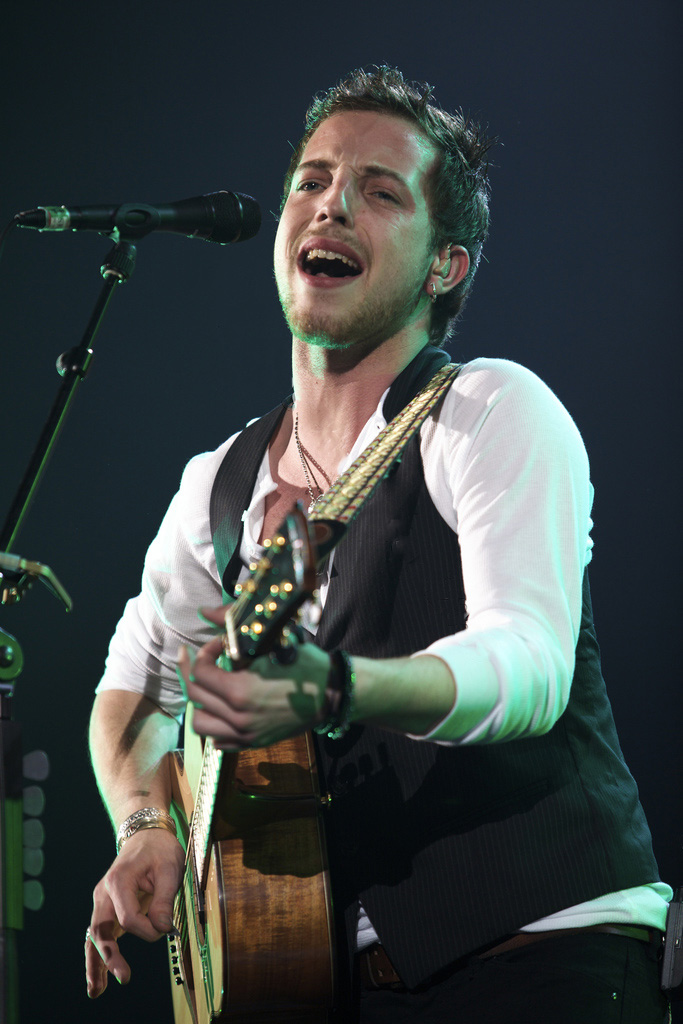
- Morrison performing at the Hammersmith Apollo in 2009

Background information
- Born: James Morrison Catchpole; 13 August 1984 (age 42); Rugby, Warwickshire, England
- Genres: Soul; pop rock; alternative rock
- Occupations: Singer; musician
- Instruments: Vocals; guitar; piano
- Years active: 2006–present
- Labels: Stanley Park; Island; Interscope; Polydor
- Spouse: Gill Catchpole (m. 2006; died 2024)
- Children: 2
- Website: jamesmorrisonmusic.com

Logo
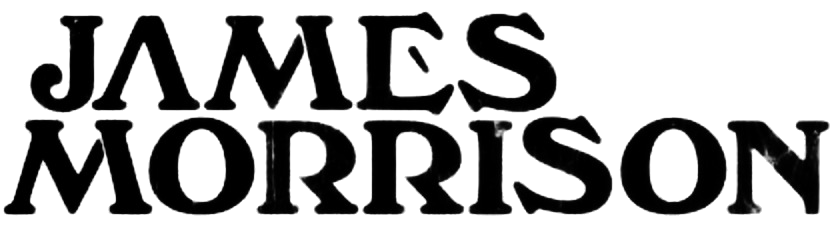

James Morrison Catchpole (born 13 August 1984) is an English singer. He rose to recognition for his 2006 debut single "You Give Me Something", which peaked within the top five on the UK Singles Chart, received platinum certification by the British Phonographic Industry (BPI), and became a hit song in several European regions. Following its success, he signed with Polydor Records to release his debut studio album Undiscovered (2006), which peaked atop the UK Albums Chart. At the Brit Awards 2007, Morrison won the Brit Award for Best British Male from three total nominations, namely British Breakthrough Act and Song of the Year for the aforementioned.

His second album, Songs for You, Truths for Me (2008) entered the top five of the UK Albums Chart and peaked the Irish Albums Chart. It was supported by the UK top ten singles "You Make It Real" and "Broken Strings" (featuring Nelly Furtado). After its release, he departed Polydor in favour of Island Records. His third album, The Awakening (2011) peaked atop the chart once more, while his fourth album, Higher Than Here (2015) peaked within the top ten.

Outside of his recording career, Morrison has been credited with songwriting work for other artists including Demi Lovato, Olly Murs, Kelly Clarkson, and Clay Aiken. He wrote Italian singer Marco Carta's 2010 single "Quello che dai", which debuted atop the Federazione Industria Musicale Italiana, the country's native music chart.

== Early life ==
Morrison was born in the town of Rugby, Warwickshire, where he was surrounded by the influence of his parents' record collection; his mother was a fan of soul and his father enjoyed folk and country. He began playing guitar when his uncle Joe showed him how to play a blues riff. As a teenager he started busking when he lived in Porth, Newquay, Cornwall, in a local pub called the Phoenix, Watergate Bay. He used to practise playing his guitar on the promenade looking over Porth beach. He took GCSE music at Treviglas Community College. After some years of covering other musicians' songs, he eventually started to write his own. He attributes his distinctive voice to a severe bout of whooping cough that nearly killed him when he was a baby.

Morrison has alluded to an unhappy childhood affected by poverty and illness; he said of his hometown, "The best thing is I've got memories of being a kid there, and the worst thing is I've got memories of being a kid there." When Morrison was only a few weeks old, he contracted whooping cough and was given a 30% chance of survival from doctors, who believed that if he survived he would be severely brain damaged. He states that he "went blue and stopped breathing and [doctors] had to resuscitate me four times." After the experience, his parents divorced when he was four years old, and he suffered from low self esteem at school, where he was ostracized for being involved in music rather than sports. He finally gained confidence when he moved to Cornwall as a teenager, where people were more accepting of his musical inclinations.

According to Morrison, he was influenced by music from a very young age, listening to artists such as Stevie Wonder, Otis Redding, Van Morrison, and Al Green. Morrison said that the first time he heard Stevie Wonder's voice he was close to tears, and he has since been fascinated by the way he uses his voice.

Working in Derby, Morrison found an Irish bar called Ryan's Bar & Scream, which runs an open mic night on Wednesdays and Sundays. Ben Wilson and Morrison became acquainted with Kevin Andrews, who produced Morrison's first demo tape and co-wrote the song "One Last Chance," which later was re-recorded and appeared on his debut studio album, Undiscovered. His demos were eventually picked up by Polydor Records.

== Career ==
=== Breakthrough and Undiscovered ===
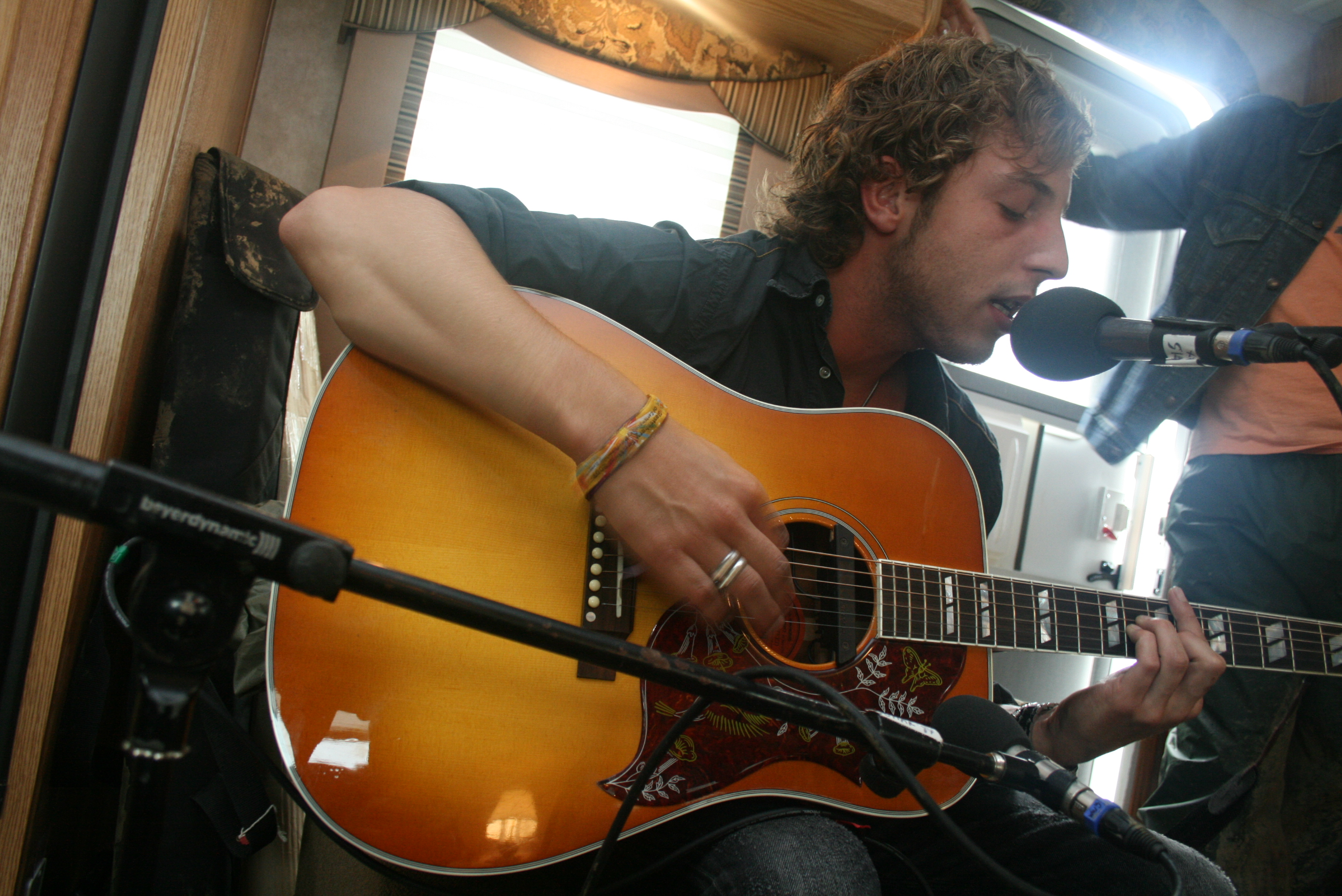
Morrison on 24 June 2007 at the Glastonbury Festival

He achieved worldwide success with debut single "You Give Me Something", which reached No. 2 in the Netherlands and the No. 5 spot in the UK. He released his debut album Undiscovered on 31 July 2006. The album received generally positive reviews, with The Sun claiming, "There isn't a bad track on it". An equally positive review by The Times stated that "Undiscovered may prove to be the least apposite album title for years". It topped the UK Albums Chart on its first week of its release. The album sold over one million copies around the world by the end of 2006., making him the best-selling male solo artist of 2006 in the UK.

The album's second single was "Wonderful World", which broke into the top ten in the UK after its CD single release, peaking at No. 8. The song fared just as well in the Netherlands, where it peaked at No. 8. This was his second top ten single after the success of "You Give Me Something". On 18 December 2006 Morrison's third single, "The Pieces Don't Fit Anymore," was released. It peaked at No. 30 in the UK. The fourth single from Undiscovered was the title song, "Undiscovered," which was released on 13 March 2007. "Undiscovered" peaked at No. 63. The song fared better in the Netherlands, where it peaked at No. 30.

Morrison was scheduled to play at the 2006 V Festival in one of the smaller tents. The audience was much larger than expected and could not fit into the tent allocated for him. As a result, he had a ten-minute set on the main stage before Hard-Fi came on (Weston Park). At the 2007 V Festival he played his full set on the main stage. He also performed "You Give Me Something" at the 2006 Royal Variety Performance before Prince Charles and The Duchess of Cornwall. He appeared on Live from Abbey Road after his live recording session at Abbey Road Studios on 5 January 2007.

After the release of Undiscovered, Morrison made his first appearance on national TV in the United States, on the Jimmy Kimmel Live! show, in addition to appearing on NBC's Today Show on 16 March 2007, performing "You Give Me Something" with just guitar and Wurlitzer piano. The album debuted at No. 24 in the US, with 24,000 copies in its first week.

In 2007 Morrison was nominated for three BRIT Awards and won the Best British Male Solo Artist category. (Other nominations were for the Best British Breakthrough Act and Best British Single Shortlist.) On 4 April 2007, he was awarded the title of an AOL Breaker artist, a contest that was voted on by the British public.

At the Concert for Diana on 1 July 2007, he performed the songs "Wonderful World" and "You Give Me Something" in honour of Princess Diana. During the summer of 2007, Morrison headlined the Forestry Commission's Forest Tour. His fifth UK single, One Last Chance, was released on 2 July 2007 as a download only. The video was shown on The Hits, The Box and Smash Hits music channels. The video was shot in Canada in April 2007. On 29 November 2007, he performed in KL Convention Center for the Acoustic Live&Loud KL '07, a music festival in Malaysia. Morrison performed alongside Rick Price and local singer Dayang Nurfaizah.

=== Songs for You, Truths for Me ===
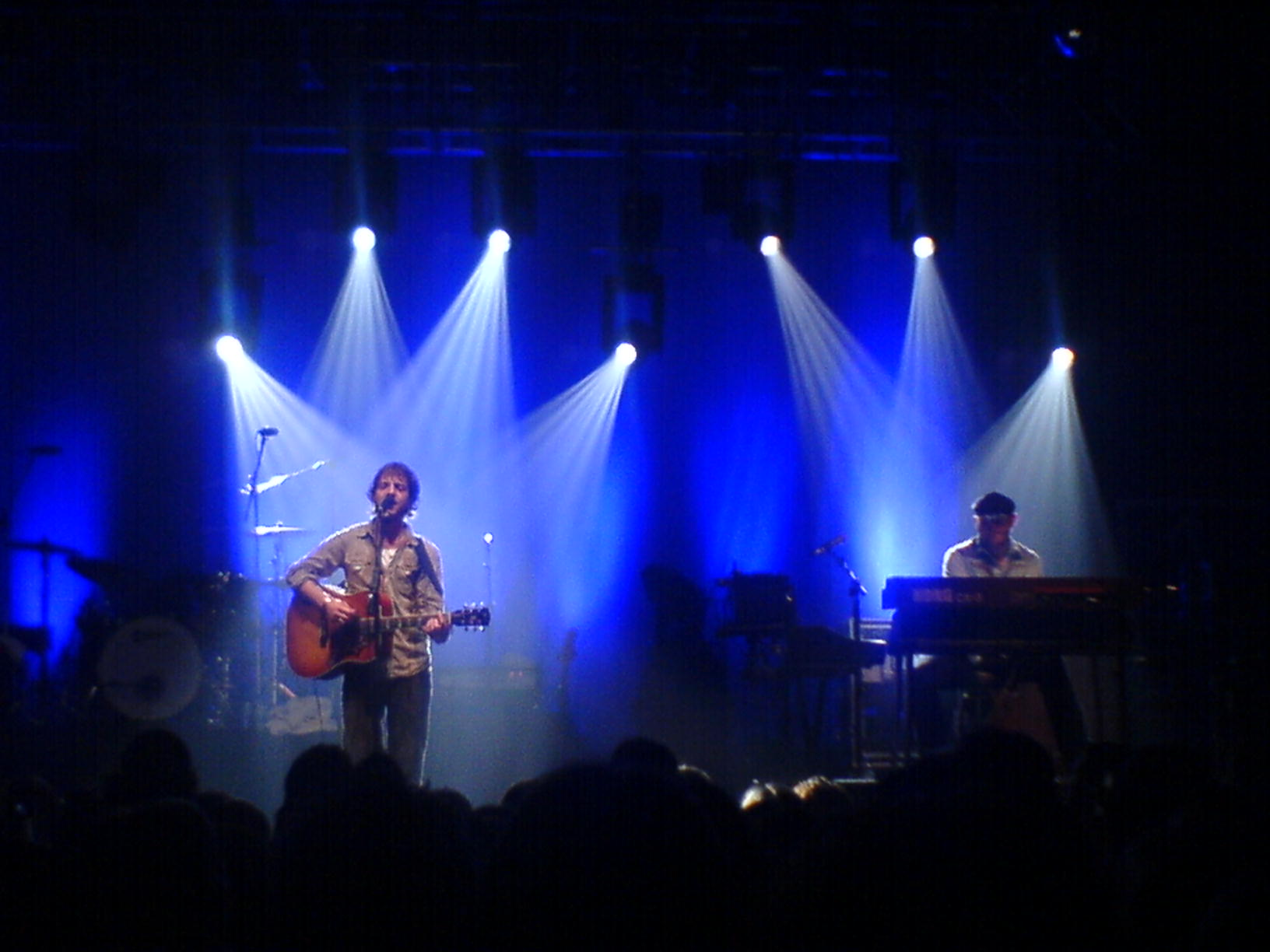
Morrison playing at the Newcastle Carling Academy

Morrison collaborated with Jason Mraz on the track "Details in the Fabric" on Mraz's studio album, We Sing. We Dance. We Steal Things., which was released on 13 May 2008.

On 29 September 2008, Morrison's second album, Songs for You, Truths for Me, was released. In writing this album he worked with Ryan Tedder, Dan Wilson, Martin Terefe, Martin Brammer, Chris Braide, and Steve Robson. The album also features a duet with Nelly Furtado titled "Broken Strings," co-written with Fraser T Smith and Nina Woodford. From October 2008 until the end of the year Morrison toured throughout Europe. The album performed well, debuting in the top three of the UK Albums Chart and spending 5 weeks in the top ten. When talking about the album, Morrison stated that the music had "moved on" a lot from the first album but not to the point where fans of his previous album wouldn't be able to "get it".

"You Make It Real" was released a week before the release of the album as the lead single. As part of the promotion, Morrison performed the single on GMTV, Radio 1's Live Lounge, and the BBC Children in Need charity appeal. The song debuted at number 7 on the UK Singles Chart, giving Morrison his third top ten hit. "You Make It Real" spent a total of eight weeks on the chart. The second single of the album was "Broken Strings," the collaboration with Nelly Furtado. The single was released on 15 December 2008. It entered the singles charts at number 73 and slowly rose for four weeks until, after a performance of the song with Girls Aloud on The Girls Aloud Party, it broke into the top ten at number 6, giving Morrison his fourth top ten hit. The next week the song hit a new high, rising to number 4 on the 2008 Christmas chart. This makes Broken Strings Morrison's most successful single by peak position to date in the UK as on 11 January 2009 it climbed to number two, being held off the top spot by Just Dance, the debut single from Lady Gaga. The song's highest entry was in Germany's Single Top 100, where it entered the chart in the top spot.

After initial success, Broken Strings, which had been gradually descending the album chart, made a leap from number forty-eight to twenty-nine and then, two weeks later, re-entered the top ten at number seven. It rose again the next week to number four and was charting at number five, twenty weeks after release. The same effect allowed Songs For You, Truths For Me to gain success in Ireland. After dropping off the Irish Albums Chart completely, it re-entered the chart at number seventy-three. It rose for several weeks until it was charting at number thirteen. The next week the album climbed to the top of the chart, entering the top ten at number one. This gave Songs For You, Truths For Me its first number one chart placement and gave Morrison his second number one album.

On 30 April 2009, it was announced on Take That's official site that Morrison would be supporting the band at some venues and dates on their 2009 tour. Morrison performed along with singer Gary Go at the Sunderland Stadium of Light on 5 June, the Coventry Ricoh Arena on 9 June, the Cardiff Millennium Stadium on 16 June and 17, the Glasgow Hampden Park on 20 June, the Manchester Old Trafford Cricket Ground on 26 June, and London's Wembley Stadium on 1 July. That same year, Morrison wrote a song, "Watch and Wait", for the German comedy film Men in the City.

In 2010 Morrison wrote a song called "Quello Che Dai" for Italian singer Marco Carta from his upcoming album "Il Cuore Muove". On 25 June 2010, Morrison performed a cover of Michael Jackson's Man in the Mirror live near the River Thames in London as part of CBS's The Early Show special remembrance event, titled "The King of Pop: One Year Later." The song was released as a single on iTunes on 24 June 2010 and in the November 2009 European double CD re-issue of Songs For You, Truths For Me. On 26 June 2010 he performed as part of the bill for the second day of Hard Rock Calling, which included Corinne Bailey Rae, Jamiroquai, and headliner Stevie Wonder, who was celebrating his 60th birthday that day.

=== The Awakening ===
In 2010, Morrison announced that he had been working on his third studio album. In a June 2010 interview he stated, "I've sung too many love ballads. I want to go a bit deeper than that and find more substance. I still don't feel confident enough to write by myself, but that is my aim. I just keep convincing myself that I'm not good enough. There are plenty of good singers out there – it's writing that's the key thing. When I'm working with other people I've heard them say 'Let's try to write a James Morrison chorus.' I want to pretend that I haven't made any albums at all and start afresh." Morrison worked with Kara DioGuardi and Toby Gad for this album.

He announced one of the tracks on the album might be called "The Awakening," saying, "I want to write about this idea of an awakening of some kind. I've written a song with that title, which I'm really happy with. There's some funky digeridoo going on".

In May he stated on his Facebook page that he had almost finished his album and would be releasing it very soon.

On 11 July, he stated on Twitter that the new album was called "The Awakening" and was due to release on 26 September. The first single was "I Won't Let You Go". The track list includes a duet with Jessie J on a track called "Up". Regarding the album's lyrics, Morrison has admitted that its themes draw on recent events in his personal life, which include becoming a father while losing his own father after the latter's long battle with alcoholism and depression.

To promote the album, he ran a competition in conjunction with NUS and MUZU TV to offer students across the UK the chance for him to play live in their living room.

Morrison worked on Demi Lovato's third album, Unbroken, released on 20 September 2011.

=== Higher Than Here ===
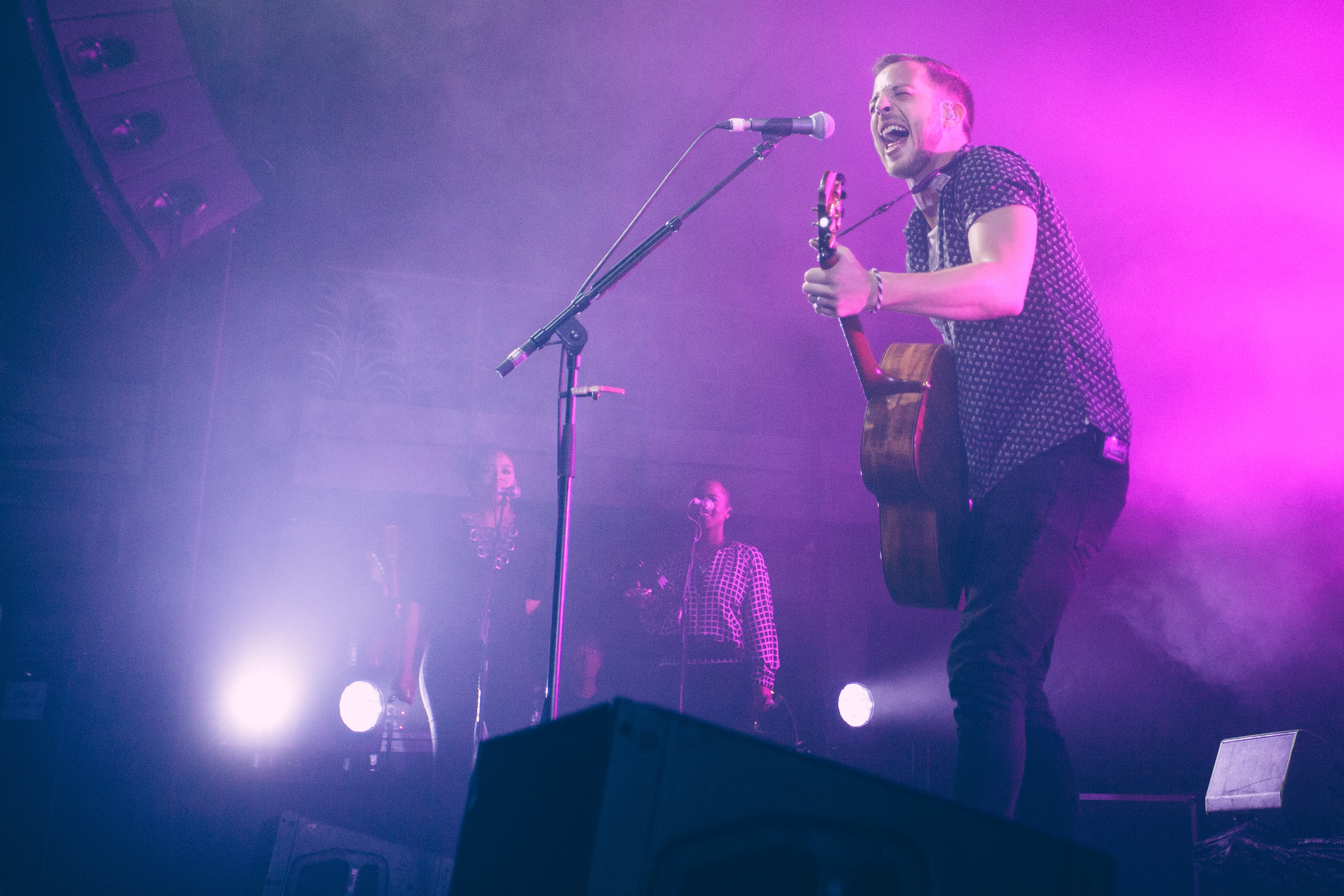
Morrison performing at a concert in Germany

Morrison's fourth studio album, Higher Than Here, was released on 30 October 2015.

The lead single, "Demons," had its official music video premiere on 10 September 2015. The music video for second single, "Stay Like This," premiered on 23 October 2015. "I Need You Tonight", the third single, was released as a music video on 6 March 2016.

=== You're Stronger Than You Know ===
Morrison's fifth studio album, You're Stronger Than You Know, was released on 8 March 2019. The album spawned 2 singles, "My Love Goes On", which features Joss Stone, and "Feels Like The First Time". He completed tours in South Africa, Australia, the UK and Europe in 2019 as well as playing festivals across the UK and Europe, including Glastonbury.

== Personal life ==
Morrison's partner Gill Catchpole took her own life on 5 January 2024 at the couple's home in Whitminster, Gloucestershire. The couple have two daughters.

== Discography ==
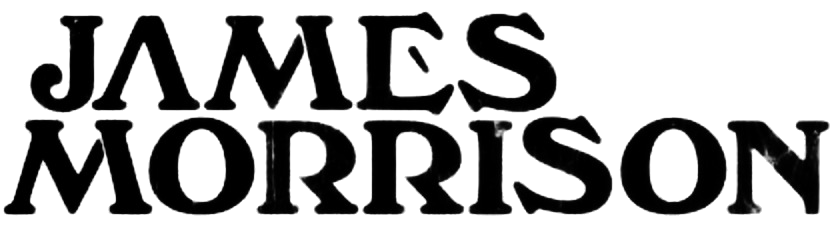
Morrison's general marketing logo, used since 2006

Albums

- Undiscovered (2006)
- Songs for You, Truths for Me (2008)
- The Awakening (2011)
- Higher Than Here (2015)
- You're Stronger Than You Know (2019)
- Fight Another Day (2025)

== Awards and nominations ==
Award	Year	Category	Nominee(s)	Result	Ref.
Brit Awards	2007	British Single of the Year	"You Give Me Something"	Nominated	
Brit Awards	2007	British Breakthrough Act	Himself	Nominated	
Brit Awards	2007	British Male Solo Artist	Himself	Won	
Brit Awards	2009	British Male Solo Artist	Himself	Nominated	
Brit Awards	2012	British Male Solo Artist	Himself	Nominated	
Echo Music Prize	2007	Best International Newcomer	Himself	Nominated	
Echo Music Prize	2012	Best International Male	Himself	Nominated	
Ivor Novello Awards	2010	Most Performed Work	"Broken Strings" (with Nelly Furtado)	Nominated	
Pop Awards	2020	Song of the Year	"My Love Goes On" (with Joss Stone)	Nominated	
RTHK International Pop Poll Awards	2012	Top Male Singer	Himself	Silver	
The Record of the Year	2009	Record of the Year	"Broken Strings" (with Nelly Furtado)	Nominated	
UK Festival Awards	2007	Festival Pop Act	Himself	Nominated	
Virgin Media Music Awards	2011	Hottest Male	Himself	Nominated	
Vodafone Live Music Awards	2007	Live Male	Himself	Nominated	
