= The First Take =

Japanese YouTube channel

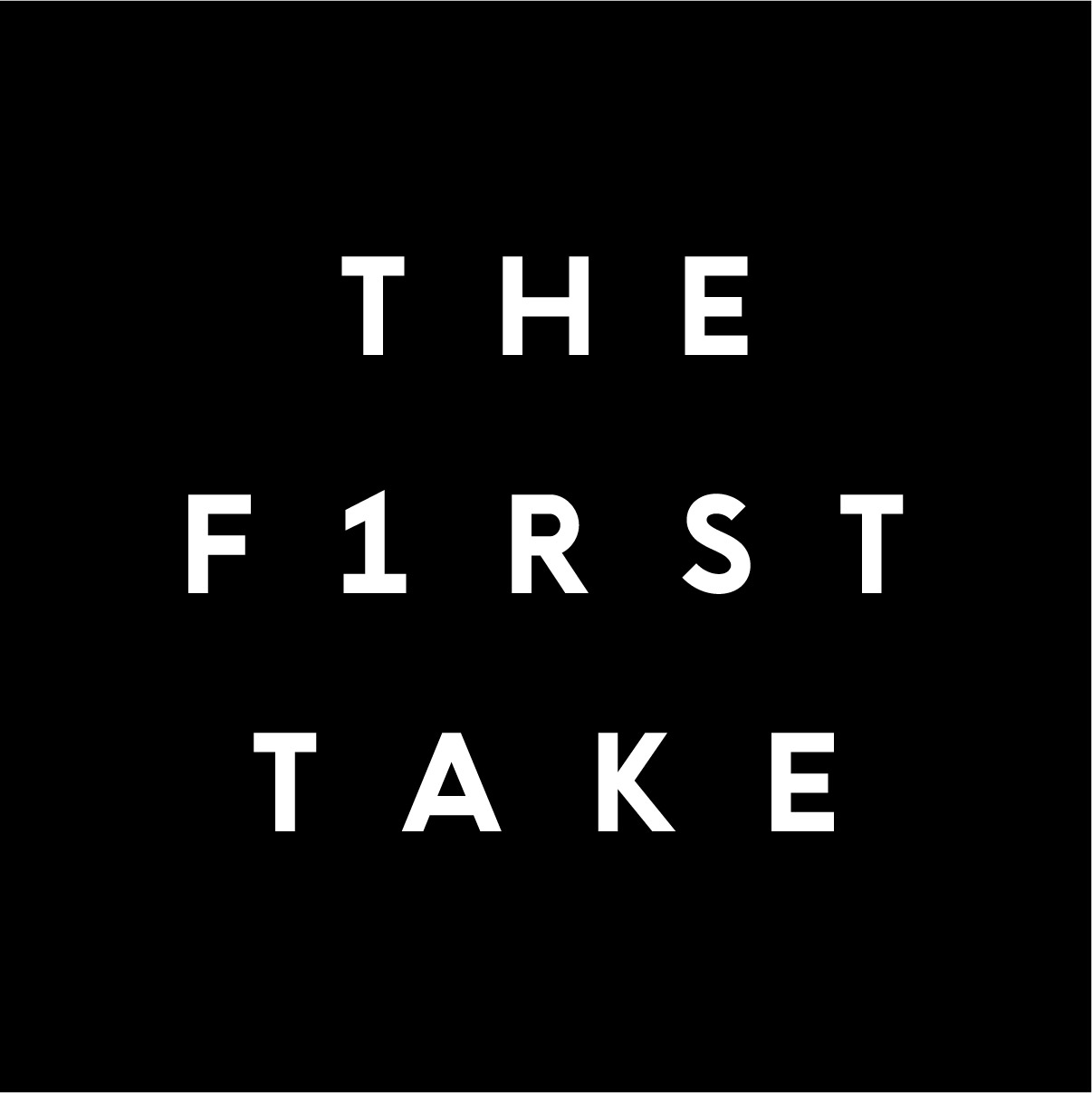

YouTube information
- Channel: The First Take
- Years active: 2019–present
- Genre: Music
- Subscribers: 12.5 million
- Views: 7.8 billion
- Last updated: November 15, 2026
- Website: www.thefirsttake.jp

The First Take (stylized as THE F1RST TAKE) is a Japanese YouTube channel that invites singers to perform a song recorded in one take in a white studio. The First Take is a trademark of Sony Music Entertainment Japan.

== Concept ==
The main concept of the channel is its simple presentation without any foreign element other than the high resolution camera and good audio quality to deliver the music's qualities to the viewers. Videos on The First Take are filmed in a studio, alternating between medium and close-up shots of only the performing singer and a microphone, set to a background that is usually white. The footage is recorded in 4K resolution with high quality audio. According to creative director Keisuke Shimizu, singers are asked to treat the filming as a live performance, The Japan Times writer Patrick St. Michel notes that The First Take's success demonstrates a shift in musical preferences in the public, suggesting that "slick, manicured pop is out and authenticity — or at least the veneer of authenticity — is in."

== History ==
On November 15, 2019, the channel published its first video featuring "Narratage" by Adieu. On December 6, Lisa's performance of "Gurenge" went viral and gained more views than the song's original music video, and is credited with popularizing the channel. Several recordings on the channel are available digitally; notably, Dish//'s performance of "Neko" peaked at 11th on the Billboard Japan Hot 100 and also placed 28th on the Year-End chart. As of August 2025, 549 episodes and almost 300 individuals or groups have appeared on the channel; six videos have more than 100 million views: "Gurenge" by Lisa, "Neko" by Dish//, "Dry Flower" by Yuuri, "Bling-Bang-Bang-Born" by Creepy Nuts, and "Yoru ni Kakeru", "Gunjō" by Yoasobi.

As a response to the lockdowns during the COVID-19 pandemic, several videos in 2020 were filmed inside the singer's home/private studio and titled "The Home Take". In June 2020, South Korean boy band Stray Kids performed "Slump" (Japanese version) on the channel, becoming the first foreign and Korean artists to appear, and was the first video to be shot remotely. The group appeared again to perform "Mixtape: Oh" in October 2021, marking the first non-Japanese song to perform on the channel.

In February 2022, singer-songwriter Ai performed her song "Aldebaran", becoming the first solo American artist to appear on the channel. The first American group to appear on the channel was Pentatonix in January 2021. On April 1, the channel published its first recording featuring non-human characters, Sesame Street muppets Elmo, Julia, and Cookie Monster, who performed "Ue o Muite Aruko" with Hinatazaka46 members Shiho Katō, Hinano Kamimura, and Mikuni Takahashi. In June, English singer Harry Styles appeared on the 225th episode, performing "Boyfriends". Styles was one of the few Western artists to appear on the channel. In September 2022, Canadian singer Avril Lavigne performed "Complicated" on the channel. In October 2022, singer-songwriter Sury Su performed her song "Liao (The Phoenix)", becoming the first solo Chinese artist to appear on the channel.

In January 2023, Hololive Production member Hoshimachi Suisei, performing her song "Stellar Stellar", became the first virtual YouTuber to perform on the channel.

On August 18, 2024, the channel exceeds 10 million subscribers, becoming the first Japanese music YouTube channel to do so.

On November 28, 2025, The Idolmaster character Chihaya Kisaragi (voiced by Asami Imai) became the first video game or anime character to perform on the channel, with the song "Yakusoku". Within three weeks on December 10, Chihaya Kisaragi would once again perform on the channel singing the song M@STERPIECE.

== List of performances ==
Key
Indicates performances by non-Japanese artists (including collaboration with Japanese artists)

=== 2019 ===
List of 2019 performances on The First Take
No.	Date	Artist(s)	Song(s)
1	November 15	Adieu	"Narratage"
2	November 23	Rude-Alpha	"It's Only Love"
3	November 29	Cö Shu Nie	"Asphyxia" (piano version)
4	December 4	Adieu	"Tenki"
5	December 6	Lisa	"Gurenge"
6	December 11	Rude-Alpha	"Wonder"
7	December 13	Huwie Ishizaki	"Sayonara Elegy"
8	December 18	Cö Shu Nie	"Inertia"
9	December 20	Little Glee Monster	"Itoshisa ni Ribbon o Kakete"
10	December 25	Lisa	"Unlasting"
11	December 27	Miliyah Kato	"Aitai"

=== 2020 ===
List of 2020 performances on The First Take
No.	Date	Artist(s)	Song(s)
12	January 10	Little Glee Monster	"Echo"
13	January 15	Huwie Ishizaki	"Kabin no Hana"
14	January 17	Sōshi Sakiyama	"Samidare"
15	January 22	Miliyah Kato	"Honto no Boku o Shitte"
16	January 24	Kana Adachi	"Hitori Yogari"
17	January 29	Sōshi Sakiyama	"Geshi"
18	January 31	Wacci (Yohei Hashiguchi)	"Betsu no Hito no Kanojo ni Natta yo"
19	February 5	Kana Adachi	"Hanashi ga Aru"
20	February 7	Queen Bee	"Ka'en"
21	February 12	Wacci (Yohei Hashiguchi)	"Tarinai"
22	February 14	The Gospellers	"Hitori"
23	February 19	Queen Bee	"BL"
24	February 21	Sayuri	"Kōkai no Uta"
25	February 26	The Gospellers	"Voxers"
26	February 28	Kiro Akiyama	"Monologue"
27	March 4	Sayuri	"Mikazuki"
28	March 6	Asca	"Resister"
29	March 11	Kiro Akiyama	"Saruagari City Pop"
30	March 13	Kana-Boon (Maguro Taniguchi), Necry Talkie (Mossa)	"Nai Mono Nedari"
31	March 18	Asca	"Koe"
32	March 20	Dish// (Takumi Kitamura)	"Neko"
33	March 25	Kana-Boon (Maguro Taniguchi)	"Marble"
34	March 27	SawanoHiroyuki[nZk]:Yosh (Survive Said the Prophet)	"Belong"
35	April 1	Dish// (Takumi Kitamura)	"Shape of Love"
36	April 3	Macaroni Empitsu (Hattori)	"Seishun to Isshun" (string version)
37	April 8	SawanoHiroyuki[nZk]:Mizuki	"Aliez"
38	April 10	TK from Ling Tosite Sigure	"Unravel"
39	April 15	Macaroni Empitsu	"Hope"
40	April 17	Ryokuoushoku Shakai	"Shout Baby"
41	April 22	TK from Ling Tosite Sigure	"Copy Light"
42	April 24	Ryokuoushoku Shakai	"Sabotage"
43	June 26	Stray Kids	"Slump" (Japanese version)
44	August 7	Sumika	"Fanfare"
45	August 14	Creepy Nuts	"Nariwai"
46	August 19	Sukima	"End Roll"
47	August 21	Masayuki Suzuki featuring Airi Suzuki	"Daddy! Daddy! Do!"
48	August 26	Creepy Nuts	"Katsute Tensai Datta Oretachi e"
49	August 28	Eir Aoi	"Ignite"
50	September 2	Masayuki Suzuki	"Koibito" + "Michi (Kōsaten)"
51	September 4	Blue Encount	"Yumemigusa"
52	September 9	Eir Aoi	"I Will..."
53	September 11	Dai Hirai	"Inoribana" (2020)
54	September 16	Kami wa Saikoro wo Franai (Shūsaku Yanagita)	"Utakata Hanabi"
55	September 18	Chico, HoneyWorks	"Sekai wa Koi ni Ochiteiru"
56	September 24	Dai Hirai	"Boku ga Kimi ni Dekiru Koto"
57	September 25	SKY-HI, Tanaka featuring Boku no Lyric no Bōyomi	"Nanisama"
58	September 25	Chico, HoneyWorks	"Shiawase"
59	October 2	Rei	"Call Me Sick"
60	October 10	Reona	"Anima"
61	October 10	Rei, Shinya Kiyozuka	"Shirayukihime"
62	October 16	Lisa	"Homura"
63	October 21	Reona	"Niji no Kanata ni"
64	October 23	Ren	"We'll Be Fine"
65	October 28	Lisa	"Catch the Moment"
66	October 30	Yuuri	"Dry Flower"
67	November 4	Ren	"Life Saver"
68	November 6	Lisa, Uru	"Saikai" (produced by Ayase)
69	November 20	Def Tech	"My Way"
70	Unpublished (Note: The First Take performance of "Niji" was included on the limited edition of the CD single "Niji".)	Masaki Suda	"Niji"
71	November 25	SKY-HI	"Luce"
72	November 27	Flower Companyz	"Shin'ya Kōsoku"
73	December 2	Def Tech	"Like I Do"
74	December 4	JO1 (Junki Kono)	"Infinity"
75	December 9	Flower Companyz	"Tokyo Tower"
76	December 11	Yuta Orisaka	"Asagao"
77	December 16	JO1 (Junki Kono)	"Voice (Kimi no Koe)"
78	December 18	Yama	"Haru o Tsugeru"
79	December 23	Yuta Orisaka	"Torch"
80	December 25	Ai Hashimoto	"Momen no Handkerchief"

=== 2021 ===
List of 2021 performances on The First Take
No.	Date	Artist(s)	Song(s)
81	January 1	Group Tamashii	"Kimi ni Juice o Katte Ageru"
82	January 8	Juju	"Yasashisa de Afureru Yō ni"
83	January 13	Yama	"Masshiro"
84	January 15	Group Tamashii	"Mō Sukkari No Future!"
85	January 20	Juju	"Kono Yoru o Tomete yo"
86	January 22	Aina the End	"Orchestra"
87	January 27	Little Glee Monster featuring Pentatonix	"Dear My Friend"
88	January 29	Tomorrow X Together	"Crown" (Japanese version)
89	February 3	Aina the End	"Kinmokusei"
90	February 5	Super Beaver	"Hito to Shite"
91	February 10	Tomorrow X Together	"Force"
92	February 12	Zutomayo	"Byōshin o Kamu"
93	February 17	Super Beaver	"I Love You"
94	February 19	Sirup	"Loop"
95	February 24	Zutomayo	"Can't Be Right"
96	February 26	Yoasobi	"Gunjō"
97	March 3	Sirup	"Thinkin About Us"
98	March 5	Rei Yasuda featuring H Zettrio	"Brand New Day"
99	March 10	Yoasobi	"Yasashii Suisei"
100	March 12	HY	"366 Nichi"
101	March 17	Rei Yasuda	"Not the End"
102	March 19	Jun. K	"My House" (acoustic version)
103	March 24	HY	"Good Bye"
104	March 26	Fumiya Fujii	"Koi Suru Kalen"
105	March 31	Jun. K	"This Is Not a Song, 1929"
106	April 2	Da-ice (Yudai Ohno, Sota Hanamura)	"Citrus"
107	April 7	Fumiya Fujii	"Another Orion"
108	April 9	Motohiro Hata	"Uroko"
109	April 14	Da-ice (Yudai Ohno, Sota Hanamura) featuring Takahito Uchisawa (Androp)	"Love Song"
110	April 16	Who-ya Extended	"Vivid Vice"
111	April 21	Motohiro Hata	"Nakiwarai no Episode"
112	April 23	Exile Takahiro	"Lovers Again"
113	April 28	Who-ya Extended	"Q-vism"
114	April 30	Adieu	"Yoru no Ato"
115	May 5	Exile Takahiro, Harami-chan	"Motto Tsuyoku"
116	May 7	Hentai Shinshi Club	"Yokaze"
117	May 12	Adieu	"Aitte"
118	May 14	Amazarashi	"Kisetsu wa Tsugitsugi Shindeiku"
119	May 19	Hentai Shinshi Club	"Suki ni Yaru"
120	May 21	Awesome City Club	"Wasurena"
121	May 26	Amazarashi	"Long Hope Philia"
122	May 28	Novelbright (Yudai Takenaka)	"Tsukimisō
123	June 3	Awesome City Club	"Matataki"
124	June 4	Chai	"N.E.O."
125	June 9	Novelbright	"Sunny Drop"
126	June 11	Shota Shimizu	"Hanataba no Kawari ni Melody Wo"
127	June 16	Chai featuring YMCK	"Ping Pong!"
128	June 18	Maharajan	"Sailor Muntarō"
129	June 23	Shota Shimizu	"Koi Uta"
130	June 25	Fomare	"Nagai Kami"
131	June 30	Maharajan	"Eden"
132	July 2	Sora Amamiya	"Paradox"
133	July 7	Fomare	"Tobacco"
134	July 9	Reina	"Boku Dake o"
135	July 15	Sora Amamiya	"Eien no Aria"
136	July 16	Shiritsu Ebisu Chugaku	"Nanairo"
137	July 23	Asian Kung-Fu Generation	"Soranin"
138	July 28	Shiritsu Ebisu Chugaku, Huwie Ishizaki	"Jump"
139	July 30	Ryuto Kazuhara (Generations)	"Love You More"
140	August 4	Asian Kung-Fu Generation (Masafumi Gotoh), Hiroko Sebu	"Empathy"
141	August 6	Hiromi Go	"240,000,000 no Hitomi (Exotic Japan)"
142	August 11	Ryuto Kazuhara (Generations), Kenny (Spicysol)	"Beautiful Sunset"
143	August 18	Hiromi Go	"Bells of St. Augustine"
144	August 20	Miwa	"Hikari e"
145	August 25	Maisondes featuring Wanuka, Asmi	"Yowanehaki"
146	August 27	Atarayo	"10 Gatsu Mukuchi na Kimi o Wasureru"
147	September 1	Miwa	"Kanna"
148	September 3	Porno Graffitti	"Saudade"
149	September 8	Atarayo	"Natsugasumi"
150	September 10	Nogizaka46 (Sakura Endō)	"Kikkake"
151	September 15	Porno Graffitti	"Theme Song"
152	September 15	Ikimonogakari	"Kimagure Romantic"
153	September 22	Nogizaka46 (Erika Ikuta, Shiori Kubo, Haruka Kaki)	"Yasashii Dake Nara"
154	September 24	Okamoto's	"90's Tokyo Boys"
155	September 29	Ikimonogakari	"Kyō kara, Koko kara"
156	October 1	Yuuri	"Shutter"
157	October 6	Okamoto's	"Sprite"
158	October 8	Spyair	"Imagination"
159	October 13	Yuuri	"Betelgeuse"
160	October 16	Saucy Dog	"Itsuka"
161	October 20	Spyair	"Samurai Heart (Some Like It Hot!!)"
162	October 22	Taiiku Okazaki	"Nani o Yatte mo Akan wa"
163	October 27	Saucy Dog	"Yui"
164	October 29	Stray Kids	"Mixtape: Oh"
165	November 3	Taiiku Okazaki	"Ossan"
166	November 5	Mika Nakashima	"Yuki no Hana"
167	November 10	Stray Kids	"Scars"
168	November 12	Glay	"Winter, Again"
169	November 17	Mika Nakashima	"Boku ga Shinō to Omotta no wa"
170	November 19	Misia	"Ashita e"
171	November 24	Glay	"Bad Apple"
172	November 26	Moroha	"Kakumei"
173	December 1	Misia	"Higher Love"
174	December 3	Tomoyasu Hotei	"Bambina"
175	December 8	Moroha	"Rokumonsen"
176	December 10	Super Beaver featuring Haruko Nagaya	"Tokyo"
177	December 15	Tomoyasu Hotei	"Kochia"
178	December 17	Milet, Aimer, Lilas Ikuta	"Omokage" (produced by Vaundy)
179	December 24	Skirt, Punpee	"Oddtaxi"

=== 2022 ===
List of 2022 performances on The First Take
No.	Date	Artist(s)	Song(s)
180	January 1	SixTones	"Imitation Rain"
181	January 6	Punpee	"Friends"
182	January 12	SixTones	"Everlasting"
183	January 14	Iri	"Wonderland"
184	January 19	Maisondes featuring Pii, Meiyo	"Rally, Rally"
185	January 21	The Rampage from Exile Tribe (Riku, Kazuma Kawamura, Hokuto Yoshino)	"My Prayer"
186	January 27	Iri	"Matenrō"
187	January 28	Aimer	"Kataomoi"
188	February 2	The Rampage from Exile Tribe (Riku, Kazuma Kawamura, Hokuto Yoshino)	"Starlight"
189	February 5	Milet, Cateen	"Ordinary Days"
190	February 9	Aimer	"Zankyōsanka"
191	February 11	Chemistry	"You Go Your Way"
192	February 16	Milet, Cateen	"Fly High"
193	February 19	Ai	"Aldebaran"
194	February 19	Chemistry	"My Gift to You"
195	February 25	Tatsuya Kitani featuring N-buna	"Chiharu"
196	March 2	Ai	"Welcome Rain"
197	March 5	Sangatsu no Phantasia	"Seishun Nante Iranai wa"
198	March 10	Tatsuya Kitani	"Two Drifters"
199	March 11	Tamio Okuda	"Sasurai"
200	March 16	Sangatsu no Phantasia	"Hanabie Ressha"
201	March 18	Kana-Boon featuring Takahiro Yamada	"Silhouette"
202	March 23	Tamio Okuda	"Taiyō ga Miteiru"
203	March 26	Tani Yuuki	"W / X / Y"
204	March 30	Kana-Boon featuring Daisuke Kanazawa (Fujifabric)	"Starmarker"
205	April 1	Sesame Street, Hinatazaka46 (Shiho Katō, Hinano Kamimura, Mikuni Takahashi)	"Sukiyaki"
206	April 7	Tani Yuuki	"Ai Kotoba"
207	April 8	JO1	"Bokura no Kisetsu"
208	April 15	Hitsujibungaku	"Aimai de Ii yo"
209	April 20	JO1	"Move the Soul"
210	April 22	Chanmina	"Bijin"
211	April 28	Hitsujibungaku featuring Ohzora Kimishima	"Hikaru Toki"
212	April 29	Ryokuoushoku Shakai	"Character"
213	May 4	Chanmina	"Harenchi"
214	May 6	Hinatazaka46 (Shiho Katō, Kumi Sasaki, Mirei Sasaki, Suzuka Tomita)	"Do Re Mi Sol La Si Do"
215	May 11	Ryokuoushoku Shakai	"Hi wa Mata Noboru Kara"
216	May 13	Chehon	"Impact"
217	May 18	Hinatazaka46 (Kyōko Saitō)	"Boku Nanka"
218	May 20	Lilas Ikuta	"Sparkle"
219	May 25	Chehon	"Champion Road"
220	May 27	Daichi Miura	"Hikōsen"
221	May 27	Lilas Ikuta	"Lens"
222	June 3	Masayuki Suzuki featuring Suu	"Giri Giri"
223	June 8	Daichi Miura	"Sansan"
224	June 10	Nobodyknows+	"Kokoro Odoru"
225	June 13	Harry Styles	"Boyfriends"
226	June 15	Masayuki Suzuki	"Chigau, Sō Janai"
227	June 17	Kazuyoshi Saito	"Utautai no Ballad"
228	June 22	Nobodyknows+	"Hero's Come Back!!"
229	June 24	Huwie Ishizaki	"Hanataba"
230	June 29	Kazuyoshi Saito	"Ashita Daisuki na Rock 'n' roll Band ga Kono Machi ni Yattekurunda"
231	July 6	Sōshi Sakiyama, Huwie Ishizaki	"Kokuhaku"
232	August 3	Asmi	"Paku"
233	August 5	Nishina	"Heavy Smoke"
234	August 11	XIIX featuring Ai Hashimoto	"Mabataki no Tochū
235	August 12	Creepy Nuts	"Nobishiro"
236	August 17	Nishina	"Seiran Yu'ei"
237	August 17	Yuuri	"Leo"
238	August 24	Creepy Nuts	"Daten"
239	August 27	Kep1er	"Wa Da Da" (Japanese version)
240	August 27	Yuuri	"Onigokko"
241	September 2	Avril Lavigne	"Complicated"
242	September 7	Kep1er	"Wing Wing"
243	September 9	Nana Mori	"Smile"
244	September 14	Avril Lavigne	"Bite Me"
245	September 16	Endrecheri	"Machi"
246	September 21	Nana Mori	"Bye-bye Myself"
247	September 23	Wacci, Kōhei Matsushita	"Koi daro"
248	September 28	Endrecheri	"Kore Dake no Hi o Matai de Kita no Dakara"
249	September 30	ClariS	"Connect"
250	October 5	Breimen	"Musica"
251	October 7	Unison Square Garden	"Orion o Nazoru"
252	October 10	Sury Su	"The Phoenix"
253	October 12	ClariS	"Alive"
254	October 14	Wednesday Campanella	"Edison"
255	October 18	Sury Su	"Seize the Light"
256	October 20	Unison Square Garden	"Kaleido Proud Fiesta"
257	October 22	Nobuyuki Suzuki	"Futari Nori"
258	October 26	Wednesday Campanella	"Buckingham"
259	October 28	King Giddra	"Unstoppable"
260	November 3	Tooboe	"Shinzō"
261	November 5	Lisa	"Issei no Kassai"
262	November 8	WeiBird	"Red Scarf"
263	November 9	King Giddra featuring Sugizo	Raising Hell
264	November 12	Yama	"Shikisai"
265	November 16	Lisa featuring Yuki Kajiura	"Shirogane"
266	November 18	=Love	"Ano Ko Complex"
267	November 21	WeiBird	"R.I.P."
268	November 23	STU48 (Chiho Ishida)	"Hana wa Dare no Mono?"
269	November 25	Puffy	"Ai no Shirushi"
270	December 1	Skoop On Somebody	"Sha La La"
271	December 2	Higuchi Ai	"Akuma no Ko"
272	December 7	Anly featuring Matt Cab, Matz	"Kara no Kokoro"
273	December 9	Kaela Kimura	"Butterfly"
274	December 14	Higuchi Ai	"Kanashii Uta ga Aru Riyū"
275	December 16	NiziU	"Make You Happy"
276	December 21	Kaela Kimura	"Magnetic"
277	December 23	Awich featuring Keiju	"Remember"
278	December 28	NiziU	"Blue Moon"

=== 2023 ===
List of 2023 performances on The First Take
No.	Date	Artist(s)	Song(s)
279	January 4	Awich, SugLawd Familiar, Chico Carrlito	"Longiness Remix"
280	January 6	Macaroni Empitsu	"Nan de mo Nai yo"
281	January 13	Little Glee Monster	"Sekai wa Anata ni Waraikaketeiru"
282	January 16	Jason Chan	"Lies Between Us"
283	January 18	Macaroni Empitsu	"Rinjyū Love"
284	January 20	Hoshimachi Suisei	"Stellar Stellar"
285	January 25	Little Glee Monster	"Join Us!"
286	January 27	Flow	"Go!!!"
287	January 30	Jason Chan	"One Day"
288	February 1	Hoshimachi Suisei	"Michizure"
289	February 3	Mai Shiraishi, Ayaka	"Nijiiro"
290	February 8	Flow	"Sign"
291	February 10	Uru	"Sore o Ai to Yobu Nara"
292	February 15	Ayaka	"Mikazuki"
293	February 17	Kandytown	"Curtain Call"
294	February 22	Uru	"Furiko"
295	February 24	Stray Kids	"Case 143" (Japanese version)
296	March 1	Kandytown	"Kold Chain"
297	March 3	Ano	"Chu, Tayōsei"
298	March 8	Stray Kids	"Lost Me"
299	March 10	Babymetal	"Monochrome" (piano version)
300	March 10	Ano	"Fuhen"
301	March 17	Satoshi (voiced by Rica Matsumoto)	"Mezase Pokémon Master (with My Friends)"
302	March 22	Yoake featuring Rinne	"Nee"
303	March 24	Nulbarich	"New Era"
304	March 29	J.Fla	"The Hare"
305	March 31	Galileo Galilei, Ai Kayano	"Aoi Shiori"
306	April 5	Nulbarich	"Tokyo"
307	April 7	Atarashii Gakko!	"Otonablue"
308	April 12	Galileo Galilei	"Natsuzora"
309	April 14	Babymetal	"The One" (unfinished version)
310	April 17	Maluma	"Hawái"
311	April 19	Tota	"Tsumugu"
312	April 21	Yang Skinny	"Honto wa ne"
313	April 24	Maluma	"Junio"
314	April 26	Anly	"Courage" (Pink cover)
315	April 28	Da-ice	"Star Mine"
316	May 3	Yang Skinny	"Sekai ga Boku o Kirai ni Natte mo"
317	May 5	Mirror	"Stellar Moments of Humankind"
318	May 10	Da-ice	"Dandelion"
319	May 12	Be:First	"Bye-Good-Bye"
320	May 17	Mirror	"Rumours"
321	May 19	Koshi Inaba (featuring Duran)	"Hane"
322	May 24	Be:First	"Smile Again"
323	May 26	Keina Suda	"Charles"
324	May 31	Koshi Inaba	"Stray Hearts"
325	June 2	Man with a Mission, Milet	"Kizuna no Kiseki"
326	June 5	Jolin Tsai	"Womxnly"
327	June 7	Keina Suda	"Darling"
328	June 9	My First Story	"I'm a Mess"
329	June 14	Man with a Mission	"Raise Your Flag"
330	June 16	Yu-ka	"Hoshizukiyo"
331	June 19	Jolin Tsai	"Untitled"
332	June 21	My First Story	"Home"
333	June 23	Super Beaver	"Gradation"
334	June 28	Orange Spiny Crab	"Kinmokusei"
335	June 30	Takashi Fujii	"Nanda Kanda"
336	July 5	Super Beaver	"Hakanakunai"
337	July 7	Frederic	"Oddloop"
338	July 10	CDGuntee	"Microphone"
339	July 12	Takashi Fujii	"Headphone Girl (Tsubasa ga Nakute mo)
340	July 14	Queen Bee	"Mephisto"
341	July 19	Frederic	"Sparkle Dancer"
342	July 21	TrySail	"Adrenaline!!!"
343	July 24	CDGuntee	"Loneliness"
344	July 26	Queen Bee	"Teppeki"
345	July 28	Sambomaster	"Dekikkonai o Yaranakucha"
346	August 2	TrySail	"SuperBloom"
347	August 4	Tatsuya Kitani	"Where Our Blue Is"
348	August 9	Sambomaster	"Future Is Yours"
349	August 11	Shōnan no Kaze	"Junrenka"
350	August 16	Spicy Chocolate featuring R-Shitei, Chehon	"Agari Sagari"
351	August 18	Reol	"The Sixth Sense"
352	August 23	Shōnan no Kaze	"Ōgon Soul"
353	August 25	Monkey Majik	"Sora wa Marude"
354	August 30	Reol	"Edge"
355	September 1	Ryokuoushoku Shakai	"Summer Time Cinderella"
356	September 6	Monkey Majik	"Around the World"
357	September 8	Porno Graffitti	"The Day"
358	September 13	Ryokuoushoku Shakai	"Magic Hour"
359	September 15	(G)I-dle	"Queencard"
360	September 18	V	"Slow Dancing"
361	September 20	Porno Graffitti	"Agehachō"
362	September 22	Imase	"Night Dancer"
363	September 27	(G)I-dle	"I Do"
364	September 29	Sōshi Sakiyama	"Akari"
365	October 4	Imase	"Utopia"
366	October 6	Six Lounge	"Rica"
367	October 11	Yena	"Smiley" (Japanese version)
368	October 13	Does	"A Cloudy Sky"
369	October 18	Kyrie (Aina the End)	"Awaremi no Sanka"
370	October 20	Shoko Nakagawa	"Sorairo Days"
371	October 25	Does	"Bakuchi Dancer"
372	October 27	Itzy	"Wannabe (Japanese version)
373	November 1	Shoko Nakagawa	"Shoko Nakagawa"
374	November 3	Kotaka	"Sonna Jinsei o Tannō Shitai"
375	November 8	Itzy	"Ringo"
376	November 10	Chico Carlito featuring Shuto	"Let Go"
377	November 15	Kishidan	"One Night Carnival"
378	November 17	Kid Phenomenon	"Wheelie"
379	November 22	Kishidan	"Tomo yo"
380	November 24	Wanima	"Tomo ni"
381	November 27	&Team	"Under the Skin"
382	November 29	Kid Phenomenon	"Existence"
383	December 1	Ikimonogakari	"Blue Bird"
384	December 6	Wanima	"Natsuake"
385	December 8	Hitsujibungaku	"More Than Words"
386	December 11	&Team	"Dropkick"
387	December 13	Ikimonogakari	"Tokimeki"
388	December 15	XG	"Shooting Star"
389	December 20	Hitsujibungaku	"1999"
390	December 22	XG	"Winter Without You"
391	December 29	Sakurazaka46 (Karin Fujiyoshi)	"Start Over!"

=== 2024 ===
List of 2024 performances on The First Take
No.	Date	Artist(s)	Song(s)
392	January 3	Kanjani Eight	"Zukkoke Otoko Michi", "Tomoyo"
393	January 5	SixTones	"Kokkara"
394	January 8	Hiroshi Kitadani	"We Are!"
395	January 10	Sakurazaka46 (Ten Yamasaki)	"Samidare yo"
396	January 12	Nami Tamaki	"Believe"
397	January 17	SixTones	"Kimi ga Inai"
398	January 19	Måneskin	"I Wanna Be Your Slave"
399	January 24	Kanjani Eight	"Osaka Romanesque"
400	January 26	Gao	"Ending"
401	January 31	Måneskin	"Honey (Are U Coming?)"
402	February 2	T.M.Revolution	"White Breath"
403	February 7	Cö Shu Nie	"Yume o Misete"
404	February 9	Spyair	"Genjō Destruction"
405	February 14	Takanori Nishikawa	"Freedom"
406	February 16	Omoinotake	"Ikuokukonen"
407	February 19	Bad Hop	"Champion Road"
408	February 19	Bad Hop	"Kawasaki Drift"
409	February 21	Spyair	"Orange"
410	February 23	Angela Aki	"Tegami (Haikei Jūgo no Kimi e)"
411	February 28	Yusuke	"Himawari (Ōenka)"
412	March 1	Nokko	"Friends"
413	March 4	Phil Lam	"Mountains and Valleys"
414	March 6	Angela Aki, Natsumi Kon, Sakurako Ohara	"Kono Sekai no Achikochi ni"
415	March 8	Creepy Nuts	"Bling-Bang-Bang-Born"
416	March 11	Loren Allred, Nobuo Uematsu ConTiki	"No Promises to Keep"
417	March 13	Nokko	"Ningyo"
418	March 15	Zerobaseone	"In Bloom" (Japanese version)
419	March 20	Phil Lam, Cath Wong, Mischa Ip	"Art and Science"
420	March 22	Riize	"Get a Guitar"
421	March 27	Airi Suzuki featuring Sorane, Taku Takahashi (M-Flo)	"Koi ni Ochitara"
422	March 29	Loren Allred	"Never Enough"
423	April 3	Riize	"Love 119" (Japanese version)
424	April 5	Creepy Nuts	"Biriken"
425	April 5	A-Lin	"A Kind of Sorrow"
426	April 12	West	"Ee Janai ka"
427	April 17	A-Lin	"Best Friend"
428	April 19	Yuki Chiba	"Team Tomodachi"
429	April 24	West	"Heart"
430	April 26	Hitorie	"Unknown Mother-Goose"
431	May 1	Fruits Zipper	"Watashi no Ichiban Kawaii Tokoro"
432	May 3	Tsuyoshi Nagabuchi	"Tonbo"
433	May 8	Hitorie	"On the Front Line"
434	May 10	Ano featuring Lilas Ikuta	"Zezezezettai Seiiki"
435	May 15	Tsuyoshi Nagabuchi	"Black Cloak and Red Apple"
436	May 17	Psychic Fever, JP the Wavy	"Just Like Dat"
437	May 22	Lilas Ikuta featuring Ano	"Seishun Ōka"
438	May 24	Dozan11 AKA Dōzan Miki	"Lifetime Respect"
439	May 29	Lex & Lana	"Akarui Heya"
440	May 31	Wands	"Sekai ga Owaru Made wa..."
441	June 5	Kimaguren	"Life"
442	June 7	Kessoku Band	"Guitar, Loneliness and Blue Planet"
443	June 12	Chō Tokimeki Sendenbu	"Saijōkyū ni Kawaii no!"
444	June 14	ALI featuring Hannya	"Professionalism"
445	June 19	Kessoku Band	"Shine as Usual"
446	June 21	INI	"Fanfare"
447	June 26	Da-ice	"I Wonder"
448	June 28	Noa	"Any Angle"
449	July 1	SB19	"Gento"
450	July 3	INI	"I'm a Dreamer"
451	July 5	Asian Kung-Fu Generation	"Haruka Kanata"
452	July 8	JxW	"Last Night" (acoustic version)
453	July 10	Noa	"My Lovely Killer"
454	July 12	Ai Otsuka	"Planetarium"
455	July 15	SB19	"Mapa"
456	July 17	Asian Kung-Fu Generation	"Rock'n Roll, Morning Light Falls on You"
457	July 19	Hakushi Hasegawa	"Somoku"
458	July 22	BoyNextDoor	"Earth, Wind & Fire" (Japanese version)
459	July 24	Ai Otsuka	"Sakuranbo (Cocktail)"
460	July 26	Rikondensetsu	"Love Is More Mellow"
461	July 28	Hakushi Hasegawa	"Outside"
462	August 2	Neguse	Nichijō Kakumei
463	August 7	Rikondensetsu	"Honjitsu no Osusume"
464	August 9	Aqua Timez	"Niji"
465	August 12	Aespa	"Supernova"
466	August 14	Neguse	"Zutto Suki da kara"
467	August 16	Bakufu Slump	"Runner"
468	August 21	Aqua Timez	"Senno Yoru o Koete"
469	August 23	Umeda Cypher	"Switch (Be the Monsterr)"
470	August 26	Aespa	"Hot Mess"
471	August 28	=Love	"Zettai Idol Yamenaide"
472	August 30	Kocchi no Kento	"Hai Yorokonde"
473	September 4	Umeda Cypher	"Rodeo13"
474	September 6	Bird	"Soul"
475	September 11	TWS	"If I'm S, Can You Be My N?"
476	September 13	Bim	"Bonita"
477	September 18	Bird	"Sora no Hitomi"
478	September 20	Wednesday Campanella	"Charlotte"
479	September 25	Bim featuring Kohjiya, Punpee	"DNA"
480	September 27	Natsuko Nisshoku	"Water Flow Rock"
481	October 9	Kiyoshi Ryujin 25	"Will You Marry Me?"
482	October 11	Zarame	"Sixth Magnitude Star"
483	October 16	Kiro Akiyama	"Caffeine"
484	October 18	Shota Shimizu	"Home"
485	October 23	ClariS	"Hitorigoto"
486	October 25	Marcy	"Love Song"
487	October 28	Laufey	"From the Start"
488	October 30	Shota Shimizu	"Puzzle"
489	November 1	Lana	"It's Okay"
490	November 6	Marcy	"Present"
491	November 8	The Bonez	"Straight Up" featuring KJ
492	November 11	Laufey	"Goddess"
493	November 13	Lana featuring Watson	"Still Young More Rich"
494	November 20	Dragon Ash featuring Jesse	"Straight Up"
495	November 22	Morning Musume '24	"Ren'ai Revolution 21"
496	November 27	Gemn	"Fatal"
497	November 29	Tate McRae	"Greedy"
498	December 4	Morning Musume '24	"Wake-up Call～Mezameru Toki～"
499	December 6	Ryokuoushoku Shakai	"Be a flower"
500	December 13	Cutie Street	"Kawaii Dake Ja Damedesu Ka?"
501	December 18	Ryokuoushoku Shakai	"Bokurawa Iki Monodakara"
502	December 20	Yuuri	"Bilimillion"
503	December 25	Babymonster	"Drip"
504	December 27	adieu	"Ana Aki no Sora"

=== 2025 ===
List of 2025 performances on The First Take
No.	Date	Artist(s)	Song(s)
505	January 3	Yuuri	"DiNA"
506	January 8	Adieu	"Awabuki"
507	January 10	NiziU	"Sweet Nonfiction"
508	January 15	Ikimonogakari	"Koisuru Otome"
509	January 17	Yu Takahashi	"Ashita wa Kitto ii Hi ni Naru"
510	January 20	NuNew	"Anything"
511	January 22	NiziU & Motoki Ohmori	"AlwayS"
512	January 24	Omoinotake	"Last Note"
513	January 27	Mao Fujita	"Beethoven: Piano Sonata No.23 F minor Op.57 'Appassionata' Mov.3"
514	January 29	Yu Takahashi	"Kiseki"
515	January 31	Shinsei Kamattechan	"Rock n' Roll wa Nari Yamanai"
516	February 3	NuNew	"First date at Shibuya"
517	February 5	Omoinotake	"Iolite"
518	February 7	Conton Candy	"Fuzzy Navel"
519	February 10	Mao Fujita	"Chopin: 24 Preludes Op.28 No.24 D minor"
520	February 12	Shinsei Kamattechan	"Yozora no Ryusei"
521	February 14	Crychic	"Haruhikage"
522	February 17	Tate McRae	"2 Hands"
523	February 19	Conton Candy	"Futsuu"
524	February 21	Masayoshi Oishi	"Kimi Janakya Dame Mitai"
525	February 26	MyGO!!!!!	"Senzaihyoumei"
526	February 28	Dai Hirai	"Mata au hi made"
527	March 5	Masayoshi Oishi	"Uni-Verse"
528	March 7	Hayato Sumino	"7 Variations on Twinkle Twinkle Little Star"
529	March 12	Dai Hirai	"Shiawase no Recipe"
530	March 14	AKINO from bless4	"Genesis of Aquarion"
531	March 19	Hayato Sumino	"Ravel: Bolero"
532	March 21	Naotaro Moriyama	"Sakura"
533	March 26	Ai Kawashima	"Asu e no Tobira"
534	March 28	Nogizaka46 (Nagi Inoue, Aruno Nakanishi)	"Kimi no Na wa Kibou"
535	April 2	Naotaro Moriyama	"Ano Umini Kakaru Nijiwo Kimiwa Mitaka ~ Bye Bye"
536	April 9	Nogizaka46 (Nagi Inoue, Aruno Nakanishi)	"Navel Orange"
537	April 11	Nanao Akari feat. Sou	"Turing Love"
538	April 16	Rake	"Hyakuman Kai no I Love You"
539	April 18	Shiritsu Ebisu Chugaku	"Karikeiyaku no Cinderella"
540	April 21	Awich featuring Ferg	"Butcher Shop"
541	April 23	Nanao Akari	"Good Luck to Me Tomorrow"
542	April 25	QWER	"T.B.H"
543	April 30	Asterism & Marty Friedman	"Gyutto!!"
544	May 2	Hikaru Utada	"Mine or Yours"
545	May 9	Shytaupe	"Rendezvous"
546	May 14	Hikaru Utada	"First Love"
547	May 16	Chanmina & No No Girls finalists	"Sad Song"
548	May 21	Shytaupe	"It's Myself"
549	May 23	Candy Tune	"Baibai Fight!"
550	May 28	Chanmina	"Work Hard"
551	May 30	Superfly	"Ai o Komete Hanataba o"
552	June 2	IVE	"After Like"
553	June 4	Swetty & Elle Teresa	"I Just"
554	June 6	m-flo	"Come Again"
555	June 11	Superfly	"Hitotoshite"
556	June 13	reGretGirl	"Whiteout"
557	June 16	IVE	"Dare Me"
558	June 18	m-flo loves Zico & Eill	"Eko Eko"
559	June 20	Stray Kids	"Chk Chk Boom (Japanese ver.)"
560	June 25	reGretGirl	"Daydream"
561	June 27	Spira Spica	"Sun Sun Days"
562	June 30	Damiano David	"Born with a Broken Heart"
563	July 2	Stray Kids	"Hollow"
564	July 4	Hana	"Rose"
565	July 7	Damiano David feat. d4vd	"Tangerine"
566	July 9	Spira Spica & Real Akiba Boyz	"Ai no Kirameki"
567	July 11	Kana Nishino	"Aitakute Aitakute"
568	July 14	d4vd	"Here With Me"
569	July 16	Hana	"Blue Jeans"
570	July 18	Orange Range	"Ikenai Taiyou"
571	July 23	Kana Nishino	"Magical Starshine Makeup"
572	July 30	Orange Range	"Hana"
573	August 1	Mao Abe	"I Wanna be Your Girlfriend"
574	August 4	Vincy	"Sora"
575	August 6	Aina The End	"On the Way"
576	August 8	Kome Kome Club	"Roman Hikou"
577	August 11	UMI	"Remember Me"
578	August 13	Mao Abe	"Stalker's Song -3rd Street, Around Your Home-"
579	August 15	Anisama Friends (Angela, Masayoshi Oishi, Masami Okui, TrySail & FLOW )	"Butter-Fly"
580	August 18	Lagchun	"Flyin' For Your Love 2882:85"
581	August 20	Kome Kome Club	"Kimiga Irudakede"
582	August 22	Rip Slyme	"Nettaiya"
583	August 25	UMI	"Mango Sticky Rice"
584	August 27	Anisama Friends (Angela, Masayoshi Oishi, Masami Okui, TrySail & FLOW)	"ONENESS"
585	August 29	Reira Ushio	"Sentimental Kiss"
586	September 3	Rip Slyme	"One"
587	September 5	Kroi	"Sesame" & "Fire Brain"
588	September 10	Reira Ushio	"Harenohini"
589	September 12	STUTS feat. PUNPEE	"Yoru wo Tsukaihatashite"
590	September 17	Kroi	"Method"
591	September 19	SKY-HI	"To The First"
592	September 24	STUTS feat. Kohjiya, Hana Hope	"99 Steps"
593	September 26	toe feat. Asako Toki & Seigen Tokuzawa	"Goodbye"
594	September 29	BoyNextDoor	"If I Say, I Love You"
595	October 1	SKY-HI feat. STARGLOW	"At The Last"
596	October 3	Illit	"Magnetic"
597	October 6	BoyNextDoor	"Count to Love"
598	October 8	toe	"Chiaroscuro"
599	October 10	Hanako Oku	"Kawaranai Mono"
600	October 15	Illit	"Almond Chocolate"
601	October 17	Lars Huang	"Grow Up"
602	October 20	SB19	"Dam"
603	October 22	Hanako Oku	"Garnet"
604	October 24	Be:First	"Muchu"
605	October 29	Lars Huang	"Doppler Longings"
606	October 31	Tani Yuuki	"Okaeri"
607	November 3	SB19	"Time"
608	November 5	Be:First	"I Want You Back"
609	November 7	Juice=Juice	"'You can live on your own.' Is this a compliment or what?"
610	November 12	Tani Yuuki	"Moshimonogatari"
611	November 14	Babymonster	"Sheesh"
612	November 19	Juice=Juice	"More! Mi Amore"
613	November 21	HoneyWorks	"Kawaikute Gomen"
614	November 26	Babymonster	"We Go Up"
615	November 28	Chihaya Kisaragi	"Yakusoku"
616	December 3	HoneyWorks	"Kessen Spirit"
617	December 5	Domoto	"Ai no Katamari"
618	December 10	Chihaya Kisaragi	"M@sterpiece"
619	December 12	Kiyoshi Hikawa	"Kiyoshi no Zundokobushi"
620	December 15	Silica Gel	"No Pain"
621	December 17	Akeboshi	"Wind"
622	December 19	Kiyoshi Hikawa	"Shirosuiren"
623	December 24	Kana-Boon	"Silhouette New Go-Line ver."
624	December 26	Lilas feat. Marasy	"Koikaze"
625	December 29	Silica Gel	"Big Void"

=== 2026 ===
List of 2026 performances on The First Take
No.	Date	Artist(s)	Song(s)
626	January 1	Phantom Siita	"Fleeting Lullaby", "Just Wanna ×××× With You", "Readymade", "Otomodachi"
627	January 1	Ado	"Usseewa"
628	January 7	Zico, Lilas Ikuta	"Duet"
629	January 9	Chocolate Planet	"FCKY-People canceling their baths"
630	January 14	Pxrge Trxxxper	"Revenge"
631	January 16	NMIXX	"O.O"
632	January 21	Chocolate Planet	"Mr. Parka Jr. - Be Quiet! Remix"
633	January 23	Airi Suzuki	"Hatsukoi Cider"
634	January 26	Phantom Siita	"Zoku Zoku"
635	January 28	NMIXX	"Spinnin' on It"
636	January 30	Humbreaders	"Ginga Kousoku"
637	February 4	Airi Suzuki	"The Magic of 'I'm Home'"
638	February 6	Thelma Aoyama feat. SoulJa	"Soba ni Iru ne"
639	February 11	Humbreaders	"Paragraph of Love"
640	February 13	Humbert Humbert	"Smiles and Stumbles"
641	February 20	Okamoto's & KEIJU	"Seasons"
642	February 25	Humbert Humbert	"Tora"
643	February 27	Seamo	"Mata Aimashou"
644	March 6	Miwa	"Sakuramitainakoinanda"
645	March 9	Remioromen	"Sangatsu Kokonoka"
646	March 13	Tokyo Ska Paradise Orchestra vs. Koshi Inaba	"Action"
647	March 16	Ado feat. Phantom Siita	"AiAiA"
648	March 18	Miwa	"Kataomoi"
649	March 19	SO-SO	"This Is 8bit"
650	March 20	MAZZEL	"Only You"
651	March 23	Remioromen	"Saa Hajimeyo"
652	March 27	Flow	"Colors"
653	April 1	MAZZEL	"Get Up And Dance"
654	April 8	Flow	"Hero -Kibou no Uta-"
655	April 10	Miliyah Kato	"Sayonara Baby"
656	April 15	LANA, Elle Teresa	"Days Like This"
657	April 17	NOMELON NOMELON	"Midnight Reflection"
658	April 22	Miliyah Kato	"HEART BEAT"
659	April 24	MON7A	"Boku no kawaikochan"
660	April 29	NOMELON NOMELON	"Mitemite"
661	May 1	Yūko Natsuyoshi, Saori Hayami	"Ray (Cosmic Princess Kaguya)"
662	May 4	Ca7riel & Paco Amoroso feat. Yu Seki, Kazuki Arai from King Gnu	"Baby Gangsta"
663	May 6	MON7A	"Oyasumi Taxi"
664	May 8	Kariyushi58	"Anma"
665	May 11	No Na	"Shoot"
666	May 13	Yūko Natsuyoshi, Saori Hayami	"World is Mine (CPK!Remix)"
667	May 15	Sekai no Owari	"Nemuri Hime (Happy Ending Version)"
668	May 18	No Na	"Rollerblade"
669	May 20	Kariyushi58	"Owarihajimari"
670	May 22	Halcali	"Otsukare Summer"
671	May 27	Sekai no Owari	"Habit"
672	May 29	Kyary Pamyu Pamyu	"Kimi ni 100 Percent"
673	June 3	Yasuyuki Okamura, Kento Nakajima	"Shunpatsuteki ni Koi Shiyou"
674	June 5	Orange Range	"Champione"
675	June 10	JI BLUE	"Keshiki"
676	June 12	Little Glee Monster	"Jupiter"
677	June 17	Orange Range	"1000%"
678	June 19	Sweet Steady	"Sweet Step"
679	June 24	Little Glee Monster	"Ichirin"
680	June 26	Ca7riel & Paco Amoroso	"Muero"
681	July 1	Kvi Baba ft. Kreva	"BPM"
682	July 3	Six Lounge	"Kimi ga Mabushii kara Boku wa Hoshi ga Mienai"
683	July 6	Taeyang	"1AM (Japanese version)"
684	July 8	Passcode	"Ray"
685	July 10	T.M.Revolution	"Hot Limit"
686	July 15	Magokoro Brothers	"Summer Nude"
687	July 17	Yabai T-shirts yasan	"Happy Wedding Mae Song"
688	July 20	Taeyang	"Life Fast Die Slow"
689	July 22	T.M.Revolution	"Thunderbird"
690	July 24	Snow Man	"Good Time"
691	July 31	≠Me	"Ai Kudasai Mase"
692	August 3	Hearts2Hearts	"Rude! (Japanese version)"
693	August 5	Yabai T-shirts yasan	"Algorithm no Inu"
694	August 8	Super Eight with The Inazuma Sentai	"Musekinin Hero"
695	August 12	Shiritsu Ebisu Chugaku × Hattori (from Macaroni Empitsu)	"Ai no Rental"
696	August 17	Sasane	"Mosi Mosi? LEESOL (KiiiKiii) Remix"
697	August 19	Super Eight	"Omoidama"
698	August 21	The Spellbound × Boom Boom Satellites	"Kick It Out"
699	August 24	Hearts2Hearts	"Iconic Heart"
700	August 28	Do As Infinity	"Hi no Ataru Sakamichi"
701	September 2	The Spellbound × Boom Boom Satellites	"Brand New Drive"
702	September 4	Macaroni Empitsu	"Route 16"
703	September 7	TWS	"Overdrive"
704	September 9	Do As Infinity	"Fukai Mori"
705	September 11	Six Lounge	"Mary Lou"
706	September 16	Macaroni Empitsu	"Unmei Sagashi"
707	September 18	Luna Nakagawa	"Asa ni Naranai de"
708	September 21	TWS	"Soda Soda"
709	September 23	Ms.Ooja	"Be…"
710	September 25	Lee Jisoo (Hana)	"Mismatch"
711	September 28	Kiss of Life	"Sticky"
712	October 2	Nana Mori	"Cafe au lait"
713	October 7	Lee Jisoo (Hana)	"Movie Star"
714	October 9	Wasureranneyo	"I Love You"
715	October 12	Kiss of Life	"Sweat"
716	October 14	FictionJunction	"Kanata"
717	October 16	Kazuya Kamenashi	"Kizuna"
718	October 21	Wasureranneyo	"Nannmonee"
719	October 23	SiM	"The Rumbling"
720	October 28	Kazuya Kamenashi	"POMPEII"
721	October 30	Original Love	"Seppun"
722	November 4	SiM	"DALALA"
723	November 6	Hump Back	"Haikei Shounenyo"
724	November 11	Original Love	"Love is a Torch"
725	November 13	Ayumu Imazu	"musubi"
726	November 15	Hiromi Go × Atarashii Gakko!	"Oyome Samba"

=== Other performance ===
==== The Home Take ====
List of performances on The Home Take
No.	Date	Artist(s)	Song(s)
1	May 1, 2020	Miwa	"Don't Cry Anymore"
2	May 8, 2020	Milet	"Us"
3	May 15, 2020	Yoasobi	"Yoru ni Kakeru"
4	May 22, 2020	Shunichi Tanabe (Blue Encount)	"Polaris"
5	May 29, 2020	Omoinotake	"One Day"
6	June 3, 2020	Dish//	"Neko" (The First Take version)
7	June 5, 2020	Milet	"Inside You"
8	June 10, 2020	Kotaro Oshio, Depapepe, Sōshi Sakiyama	"Guitar Session" ("Cyborg" + "One" + "Samidare")
9	June 12, 2020	Super Beaver	"Hitori de Ikiteita Naraba"
10	June 19, 2020	Rinne	"Snow Jam"
11	July 3, 2020	Kami wa Saikoro wo Franai (Shūsaku Yanagita)	"Yonaga Uta"
12	July 10, 2020	Yuuri	"Kakurenbo"
13	July 17, 2020	Tatsuya Kitani	"Hide and Seek"
14	July 24, 2020	Tani Yuuki	"Myra"
15	July 29, 2020	My First Story	"Hyena"
16	July 31, 2020	Ryujin Kiyoshi	"Itai yo"

==== The First Take Fes ====
List of performances on The First Take Fes
Vol.	No.	Date	Artist(s)	Song(s)
1	1	January 10, 2020	ALI (Note: ALI's The First Take Fes performance were removed due to drummer Kahadio being arrested for fraud.)	"Wild Side"
1	1	January 10, 2020	ALI	"Better Days"
1	2	January 10, 2020	Taiiku Okazaki	"Yes"
1	2	January 10, 2020	Taiiku Okazaki	"Eclair"
1	3	January 10, 2020	Okamoto's	"Welcome My Friend"
1	3	January 10, 2020	Okamoto's	"No More Music"
2	4	November 18, 2020	Anna Takeuchi	"Free! Free! Free!"
2	5	November 18, 2020	Cö Shu Nie	"Zettai Zetsumei"
2	5	November 18, 2020	Cö Shu Nie	"Black Sand"
2	6	November 18, 2020	Ryokuoushoku Shakai	"Mela!"
2	6	November 18, 2020	Ryokuoushoku Shakai	"Ladybug"
2	7	November 18, 2020	Yui	"Tokyo"
2	7	November 18, 2020	Yui	"Cherry"
3	8	August 13, 2021	Burnout Syndromes	"Phoenix"
3	9	August 13, 2021	Umeda Cypher	"Umeda Night Fever '19"
3	9	August 13, 2021	Umeda Cypher featuring H.Teflon	"Travolta Custom"
3	10	August 13, 2021	Yama	"Mahi"
3	10	August 13, 2021	Yama	"A.M.3:21
3	11	August 13, 2021	Chemistry	"Pieces of a Dream"
3	11	August 13, 2021	Chemistry	"Point of No Return"

==== Inside the First Take ====
List of performances on Inside the First Take
No.	Date	Artist(s)	Song(s)
1	July 1, 2022	ALI featuring Aklo	"Lost in Paradise"
2	July 8, 2022	Yama	"Sekai wa Utsukushii Hazunanda"
3	July 13, 2022	Da-ice	"Promise"
4	July 15, 2022	Creepy Nuts	"2Way Nice Guy"
5	July 20, 2022	Sōshi Sakiyama	"Kuni"
6	July 23, 2022	Reona	"Life Is Beautiful"
7	July 27, 2022	Hentai Shinshi Club	"Tameiki"
8	July 27, 2022	Miwa	"Sparkle"

==== Flash the First Take ====
List of performances on Flash the First Take
No.	Date	Artist(s)	Song(s)
1	August 10–11, 2024	Adieu	"Back"
2	August 12–14, 2024	Umeda Cypher	"Idaten S**t"
2	August 12–14, 2024	Umeda Cypher	"Rodeo13"
3	August 15, 2024	MFS	"Combo"
3	August 16, 2024	MFS	"Don't"
4	August 17, 2024	Osage	"My Diary"
4	August 19, 2024	Osage	"Nokoriga"
5	August 24, 2024	Asmi	"Lobius"
5	August 26, 2024	Asmi	"Utage"
6	August 31, 2024	Tooboe	"Itai no Itai no Tondeike"
6	September 2, 2024	Tooboe	"Jōzai"
7	September 7, 2024	Regal Lily	"Kirakira no Hai"
7	September 9, 2024	Regal Lily	"Moonlight Reverse"
8	September 14, 2024	Myuk	"Arcana" (Eureka version)
8	September 16, 2024	Myuk	"Arcana" (acoustic version)
9	September 21, 23, 2024	Idom	"B.M.S."
10	September 16, 2024	Wednesday Campanella	"Charlotte"
11	September 28, 2024	O.J.O	"People Demon"
11	September 30, 2024	O.J.O	"Bah!"
12	October 5, 2024	Ushio Reira	"Sentimental Kiss"
12	October 7, 2024	Ushio Reira	"Miso Soup and Butter"
13	October 12, 2024	MHRJ	"Kimi no Hen"
13	October 14, 2024	MHRJ	"Ii Koto ga Shitai"
14	October 19, 2024	Wez Atlas	"40°C"
14	October 21, 2024	Wez Atlas	"One Life"
15	October 26, 2024	Asterism	"Metal"
15	October 28, 2024	Asterism	"Planet of Metal"
16	November 2, 2024	Reaction the Buttha	"Drama no Atode – Retake"
16	November 4, 2024	Reaction the Buttha	"Inside You"
17	November 9, 2024	Kana-Boon	"Song of the Dead"
17	November 11, 2024	Kana-Boon	"Bakemono"
18	November 16, 2024	Aile the Shota	"Sayonara City Light"
18	November 18, 2024	Aile the Shota	"Odorimasen ka?"
19	November 23, 2024	Yutori	"One Room"
19	November 25, 2024	Yutori	"Anminzai"
