= Dream (Ai album) =

2022 studio album by Ai

Studio album by Ai
- Released: February 23, 2022
- Recorded: 2019–2021
- Studios: Sound Inn Studio (Tokyo, Japan); Studio MSR (Tokyo); Studio Mech (Tokyo); Black Star Music (Studio City, California)
- Genres: Pop; R&B
- Length: 33:27
- Languages: Japanese; English
- Label: EMI
- Producers: Ai Uemura; Uta; Daichi Miura; Neko Saito; Bernard "Harv" Harvey; Kes Kross; Derek Anderson; DJ Ryow; Space Dust Club; Julian Le; C3prod; Nao'ymt

Ai chronology
It's All Me, Vol. 2 (2021)	Dream (2022)	Respect All (2023)

Singles from Dream
- 1. "The Moment" Released: June 28, 2021; 2. "In the Middle" Released: August 13, 2021; 3. "Aldebaran" Released: November 1, 2021

Dream is the twelfth studio album by Japanese-American singer-songwriter Ai, released on February 23, 2022, by EMI Records. Ai collaborated with various Japanese and American producers, including longtime collaborator Uta and Bernard "Harv" Harvey, the latter produced her 2021 extended play, It's All Me, Vol. 2.

Three singles were released from the album. The first single, "The Moment" featured Japanese rapper Yellow Bucks and was released in June 2021. "In the Middle", a collaboration with Daichi Miura was released in August 2021. The third single was "Aldebaran", which served as the theme song for the Japanese television drama Come Come Everybody. "Aldebaran" was a modest hit in Japan, debuting and peaking at number 37 on the Billboard Japan Hot 100 and at number 6 on the Oricon Digital Singles Chart. In 2022, "Aldebaran" won the Best Drama Song award at the 111th Television Drama Academy Awards.

== Background and promotion ==
The logo of the album

Following the release of the extended play It's All Me, Vol. 2, Ai hinted on social media she was working on new music. In June 2021, she released "The Moment" with Japanese rapper Yellow Bucks. In early August, Ai announced she was working on a new single. The single was revealed to be a song with Daichi Miura, titled "In the Middle". In September, Ai announced her next single, titled "Aldebaran". The song would serve as theme song for the NHK drama, Come Come Everybody. She revealed the song was written by Naotarō Moriyama and featured arrangements by Neko Saito. The song was sent to radio in October, with the radio edit being uploaded to Ai's official YouTube channel to promote the song. Following the release of the full song in November, "Aldebaran" has received critical acclaim. In December, Ai announced her twelfth studio album would be released in February 2022. She stated that "Aldebaran" and "In the Middle" would be included on the album. Ai also announced the Dream Tour, which took take place in Japan from May to December 2022. In February, a special site was launched for the album by Universal Japan, revealing the full track listing of the album.

== Music and lyrics ==
Musically, Dream is a pop and R&B album with gospel and hip hop influences. Three songs, "First Time", "Lessons" and "We Have a Dream" were recorded entirely in English while the rest of the songs feature bilingual lyrics. The lyrics for "First Time" are based on when Ai first started her career and how she was able to find success through many trials. "Welcome Rain" features a delicate melody about loved ones, similar to "Aldebaran".

== Commercial performance ==
Dream debuted at number 12 on the Oricon Daily Albums chart for February 22, 2022. It rose to number 7 on February 23. On the weekly Oricon charts, Dream debuted and peaked at number 12, charting for 18 consecutive weeks. The album sold more copies than her previous studio album, Wa to Yo, and her extended plays, It's All Me Vol, 1 and It's All Me, Vol. 2.

== Track listing ==
Dream track listing
No.	Title	Writer(s)	Producer(s)	Length
1.	"Aldebaran" (アルデバラン)	Naotarō Moriyama	Ai Uemura; Neko Saito	4:26
2.	"In the Middle" (featuring Daichi Miura)	Uemura; Miura; Uta	Uta; Uemura; Miura	4:27
3.	"The Moment" (featuring Yellow Bucks)	Uemura; Kazu Sakaguchi; DJ Ryow; Space Dust Club	Uemura; DJ Ryow; Space Dust Club	3:22
4.	"Welcome Rain"	Naoaki Yamata	Nao'ymt	4:31
5.	"First Time" (featuring Riehata)	Uemura; Felisha "Fury" King; Fallon King	Bernard "Harv" Harvey	3:01
6.	"Lessons"	Kes Kross	Derek Anderson	2:33
7.	"Be with You"	Uemura; Julian Le	Le; Uemura	3:45
8.	"Dear Papa" (パパへ "Papa e")	Uemura; C3prod	C3prod; Uemura	2:50
9.	"We Have a Dream"	Uemura; Nelson Babin-Coy; Kim; Uta	Uta; Uemura	4:29

Dream – limited edition DVD / Blu-ray bonus live performances from the It's All Me Tour
No.	Title	Writer(s)	Length
1.	"Opening"
2.	"I Wanna Know"	Uemura
3.	"Voice"	Uemura
4.	"Not So Different"	Uemura; Rachel West; Vincent Van den Ende; Scott Storch
5.	"Hope"	Uemura
6.	"Gift"	Uemura
7.	"My Friend"	Uemura
8.	"Believe"	Uemura
9.	"Music Is My Life"	Uemura
10.	"Life"	Uemura; Stephanie Stokes Fountain
11.	"Dear Mama"	Uemura
12.	"Kira Kira"	Uemura
13.	"Minna ga Minna Eiyū"	Makoto Shinohara
14.	"I Have Nothing"	David Foster; Linda Thompson
15.	"Story"	Uemura
16.	"The Moment"	Uemura; Sakaguchi; DJ Ryow; Space Dust Club
17.	"Not So Different" (remix featuring Awich)	Uemura; West; Akiko Urasaki; Van den Ende; Storch
18.	"Aldebaran" (encore)	Moriyama
19.	"Happiness" (encore)	Uemura
20.	"Ai Birthday Special Behind the Scenes"

Dream – limited edition DVD / Blu-ray bonus music videos
No.	Title	Director(s)	Length
1.	"Aldebaran" (music video)
2.	"In the Middle" (music video)	Yoshiharu Seri
3.	"The Moment" (music video)	Yue
4.	"Not So Different" (remix music video)

Notes

- Tracks 1–20 of the limited edition bonus DVD / Blu-ray are noted as "Ai 20th Anniversary Tour It's All Me -Ai Birthday Special- @ Tokyo International Forum 2021.11.1"

== Personnel ==
Credits adapted from album's liner notes and Tidal.

=== Musicians ===
- Ai Carina Uemura – lead vocals, songwriting, production
- Uta – production, songwriting
- Julian Le – production, songwriting
- Naotarō Moriyama – songwriting
- Neko Saito – production, arranging
- Daichi Miura – featured artist, songwriting, production
- Yellow Bucks – featured artist, songwriting
- Nao'ymt – songwriting, production
- Felisha "Fury" King – songwriting
- Fallon King – songwriting
- Kes Kross – songwriting
- Derek Anderson – production
- Kim – songwriting
- Nelson Babin-Coy – songwriting
- Midorin – drums
- Tomohiko Ohkanda – bass
- Fumio Yanagisawa – guitar
- Satoshi Onoue – guitar
- Hideaki "Lanbsy" Sakai – latin percussion
- Tomoyuki Asakawa – harp
- Great Eida – concertmaster, strings
- Jo Kuwata – violin
- Nagisa Kiriyama – violin
- Haruko Yano – violin
- Yukinori Murata – violin
- Akane Irie – violin
- Ayumu Koshikawa – violin
- Akiko Maruyama – violin
- Yui Kaneko – violin
- Masahiro Miyake – violin
- Yuji Yamada – viola
- Mayu Takashima – viola
- Ayano Kasahara – cello
- Yoshihiko Maeda – cello
- Space Dust Club – production, songwriting
- DJ Ryow – production, songwriting
- C3prod – production, songwriting
- Bernard "Harv" Harvey – production

=== Technical ===
- Mizuo Miura – vocal recording, vocal production
- Keisuke Narita – assistant vocal recording, assistant vocal production
- Taji Okuda – vocal recording, vocal production, mixing
- Keisuke Fujimaki – vocal recording, vocal production
- Shohei Ishikawa – vocal recording, vocal production
- Masahiro Abo – vocal recording, vocal production
- D.O.I – mixing
- Mark Parfitt – mixing
- Randy Merrill – mastering

=== Visuals and imagery ===
- Tatsuki Ikezawa – art director
- Shoji Uchihada – photographer
- Kanako Sato – retouching
- Shinji Konishi – hair, makeup
- Kumiko Iijima – stylist
- Machi Kagawa – designing
- Hirotaka Maeda – shooting coordination
- Erika Hiyama – shooting coordination
- Akiko Kawabata – AW production coordination

== Charts ==
=== Weekly charts ===
Weekly chart performance for Dream
Chart (2022)	Peak position
Japanese Albums (Oricon)	12
Japanese Combined Albums (Oricon)	12
Japanese Digital Albums (Oricon)	11
Japanese Hot Albums (Billboard Japan)	11

=== Monthly charts ===
Monthly chart performance for Dream
Chart (2022)	Peak position
Japanese Albums (Oricon)	45

== Release history ==
Release history and formats for Dream
Region	Date	Format(s)	Version	Label	Ref.
Various	February 23, 2022	Digital download; streaming	Standard	EMI; Universal	
Japan	February 23, 2022	CD	Standard	EMI; Universal Japan; Def Jam	
Japan	February 23, 2022	CD; DVD	Limited	EMI; Universal Japan; Def Jam	
Japan	February 23, 2022	CD; Blu-ray	Limited	EMI; Universal Japan; Def Jam	
