= Welcome Rain =

- The First Take cover

Song by Ai

from the album Dream
- Language: Japanese; English
- Released: February 23, 2022
- Recorded: 2021
- Genre: R&B
- Length: 4:31
- Label: EMI
- Songwriter(s): Naoki Yamata
- Producer(s): Nao'ymt

Live performance video
- "Welcome Rain" on YouTube

"Welcome Rain" is a song recorded by Japanese-American singer-songwriter Ai from her twelfth studio album, Dream. Written and produced by Nao'ymt, the song has been used in web commercials for Asahi Breweries. Lyrically, the song is about communication through a difficult situation. Critics have compared the song to "Aldebaran".

== Background ==
"Welcome Rain" was included on Ai's twelfth studio album Dream as its fourth track. Although not released as a single, Ai teamed up with Asahi Breweries to promote the song. In March 2022, The First Take revealed they would be releasing a live recording of Ai performing the song on their official YouTube channel. The performance would serve as her second appearance on the channel, her first previous appearance was a week prior performing "Aldebaran". The performance premiered on March 2. On March 6, EMI Records announced Ai's First Take version of "Welcome Rain" would impact digital stores on March 25. In promotion of the live performance, Asahi Breweries released a limited version of their beer with the design of The First Take logo on the can, along with a QR code to watch the performance on YouTube.

== Music and lyrics ==
Barks has described "Welcome Rain" as a song with a "delicate" melody with a "deep message", comparing it to Ai's 2021 single, "Aldebaran". Natalie Music has described the lyrics having the theme of spring.

== Live performances ==
Ai performed "Welcome Rain" live for The First Take. Ai additionally performed the song at her Dream Tour.

== Personnel ==
Credits adapted from Dream liner notes and Tidal.

Original version

- Ai Uemura – lead vocals
- Naoaki Yamata – production, songwriting
- D.O.I – mixing
- Randy Merrill – mastering

The First Take version

- Ai Uemura – lead vocals
- Naoaki Yamata – production, songwriting
- Taji Okuda – vocal engineering, mastering

== Release history ==
Release history and formats for "Welcome Rain"
Region	Date	Format	Version	Label	Ref.
Various	February 23, 2022	Digital download; streaming	Original	EMI; Universal	
Various	March 25, 2022	Digital download; streaming	First Take	EMI; Universal	
