= Come Come Everybody =

Japanese television drama

- Promotional poster
- Original title: カムカムエヴリバディ
- Genre: Drama
- Written by: Yuki Fujimoto
- Directed by: Mojiri Adachi; Shinichiro Hashizumea; Kazufumi Matsuoka; Takamasa Izunami
- Starring: Mone Kamishiraishi; Eri Fukatsu; Rina Kawaei; Kanata Hongō; Hokuto Matsumura; Nijiro Murakami; Mikako Ichikawa; Gaku Hamada; Masashi Sada; Onoe Kikunosuke V; YOU; Takehiro Murata; Mari Hamada; Masahiro Kōmoto; Yutaka Matsushige; Yasunori Danta; Joe Odagiri
- Narrated by: Yu Shirota
- Opening theme: "Aldebaran" by Ai
- Composer: Takahiro Kaneko
- Country of origin: Japan
- Original language: Japanese
- No. of episodes: 112

Production
- Executive producers: Reijiro Horinouchi; Masaru Sakurai
- Producers: Yuya Kasai; Kana Hashimoto; Asuka Saito
- Running time: 15 minutes
- Production company: NHK Osaka

Original release
- Network: NHK
- Release: November 1, 2021 – April 8, 2022

Come Come Everybody (Japanese: カムカムエヴリバディ, Hepburn: Kamu Kamu Evuribadi) is a Japanese television drama series and the 105th NHK Asadora series, following Welcome Home, Monet. It premiered on November 1, 2021, and concluded on April 8, 2022. The story is about three generations of a family, Yasuko (grandmother), Rui (mother), and Hinata (daughter) who worked with a radio English course during the Shōwa, Heisei, and Reiwa eras. The drama is set in Okayama, Osaka and Kyoto.

== Plot ==
The story is about a three generations of a family, Yasuko (grandmother), Rui (mother) and Hinata (daughter) who worked with a radio English course during the Shōwa, Heisei, and Reiwa eras. While facing the challenges of the Shōwa, Heisei, and Reiwa eras, the three find their own way of life in love, work, and marriage. The story unfolds in a heroine relay system.

Yasuko Tachibana was born in Okayama City in 1925, the year radio broadcasts began in Japan. Yasuko grows up in a warm family who owns a Japanese sweets shop in the shopping district of Okayama city. Her family wishes for her to inherit the shop but the war changed her fate. Her story is Japanese sweets and baseball-themed.

Yasuko's daughter, Rui's story begins in Osaka in 1955 with jazz as its theme. Rui separates from her mother for some reason and opens the way to live under her own will and power, even though she is hurt and lost. Rui hates her mother and English.

Meanwhile the story of Hinata, Rui's daughter and Yasuko's granddaughter, sets off in Kyoto in 1965 as a historical drama. Unlike her grandmother, Hinata was born in a peaceful time, and is a sweetheart. Hinata is a little useless but she plays an important role in this three-generation family story.

== Cast ==
=== Heroines ===
- Mone Kamishiraishi as Yasuko Tachibana / Yasuko Kijima
  - Ibuki Amimoto as young Yasuko
  - Ryoko Moriyama as old Yasuko, also known as Annie Hirakawa
- Eri Fukatsu as Rui Kijima, Yasuko's daughter
  - Misaki Nakano as young Rui (from age three to five)
  - Rin Furukawa as young Rui (age seven)
- Rina Kawaei as Hinata Otsuki, Rui's daughter and Yasuko's granddaughter
  - Chise Niitsu as young Hinata

=== Tachibana Family ===
- Masahiro Kōmoto as Kinta Tachibana, Yasuko's father
- Naomi Nishida as Koshizu Tachibana, Yasuko's mother
- Gaku Hamada as Santa Tachibana, Yasuko's older brother
- Shinya Owada as Kinetarō Tachibana, Yasuko's grandfather
- Machiko Washio as Hisa Tachibana, Yasuko's grandmother

=== Kijima Family ===
- Yasunori Danta as Senkichi Kijima
- YOU as Midori Kijima, Senkichi's wife
- Hokuto Matsumura as Minoru Kijima, Senkichi's elder son / Yasuko's husband
- Nijiro Murakami as Isamu Kijima, Senkichi's younger son / Yasuko's friend
  - Yūki Meguro as old Isamu Kijima
- Yui Okada as Yukie, Kijima family's helper
  - Yumi Takigawa as old Yukie
- Kanoko Nishikawa as Tami Murano, Kijima family's helper

=== People from Shopping Street ===
- Karin Ono as Kinu Mizuta, Yasuko's friend
- Goe Asagoe as Uhei Mizuta, the owner of Mizutaya tofu shop
- Megumi Komaki as Hanako Mizuta, Uhei's wife
- Keisuke Horibe as Kichibee Akanishi, the owner of Akanishi hardware shop, and adult Kichiemon.
- Mai Miyajima as Kiyoko Akanishi, Kichibee's wife
  - Chieko Matsubara as old Kiyoko
- Seiichiro Nakagawa as Kichiemon Akanishi, Kichibee's son
- Yūki Tokunaga as Kichinojō Akanishi, Kichibee's grandson
- Masanori Sera as Teiichi Yanagisawa, the owner of Dippermouth Blues cafe
- Tomoya Maeno as Kenichi Yanagisawa, Teiichi's son
- Oideyasu Oda as Shinpei Morioka

=== Others from Okayama ===
- Masashi Sada as Tadaichi Hirakawa, an English radio lecturer
- Tatsumasa Murasame as Robert Rosewood, an Expeditionary Army Officer / American man who loves Yasuko
- Mahiru Konno as Sumiko Ogawa, a housewife
- Yuu Tokui as Kowamote no Tanaka, a debt collector
- Midori Wakai as Ogura Kuma, a Minoru's Boarding House landlord
- Sō Takei as Kanda Takeshi, an imperial soldier

=== People in Osaka ===
- Joe Odagiri as Joichiro "Joe" Otsuki, Rui's husband
- Mikako Ichikawa as Ichiko "Berry" Noda, a female customer at Jazz cafe
- Tōko Miura as Ichie Noda, Ichiko's daughter
- Taichi Saotome as Kitazawa ”Tommy” Tomio, a musician
- Takehiro Murata as Heisuke Takemura, the owner of Takemura Cleaning Shop
- Mari Hamada as Kazuko Takemura, Heisuke's wife
- Yoshimasa Kondo as Yosuke Kogure, a bartender and owner of Jazz cafe
- Shohei Shofukutei as Futoshi Nishiyama

=== Others ===
- Onoe Kikunosuke V as Kennosuke Momoyama I, a movie star, and Kennosuke Momoyama II
- Kanata Hongō as Bunshirō Igarashi
- Yua Shinkawa as Sayoko Fujii, Hinata's friend

== Production ==
This is the first time in the history of a serial television novel that three actresses play the three main characters as different heroines. The heroine baton will be passed down to the next generation in a relay system.

The title Come Come Everybody is the title of the opening song of the NHK Radio English course, commonly known as "kamu kamu eigo" by Tadaichi Hirakawa, that once dominated Japan immediately after the end of the war. When the lyrics "Come come everybody" and the melody of the Japanese children's song "Shojoji no Tanukibayashi" started, children and elderly people all over Japan were hooked and encouraged by the cheerful voice. It conveyed Hirakawa's desire to "brighten" the dark postwar Japan. The title was made with the wish that the slogan "Come Come Everybody" would be a power word to open up the future to live in the present.

Mone Kamishiraishi and Rina Kawaei were selected as heroines through an audition which received 3061 applicants. Eri Fukatsu was chosen by NHK. This is Mone Kamishiraishi and Eri Fukatsu's first appearance in an asadora. Rina Kawaei already appeared in the asadora Toto Neechan (2016).

On July 21, 2021, it was announced that the broadcast would start on November 1, 2021. On September 27, it was announced that the theme song for Come Come Everybody would be "Aldebaran", a song recorded by Japanese-American singer-songwriter Ai that was released on November 1, 2021. The song, written Naotarō Moriyama features arrangements by Neko Saito and was produced by Ai and Saito. The song originally was about environmental issues and was titled "Daphnia Pulex". "Aldebaran" was not intended to be the theme song for Come Come Everybody until Moriyama allowed Ai to record the song with reworked lyrics. "Aldebaran" was later included on Dream, Ai's twelfth studio album.

On October 7, 2021, the main poster of the drama was released. The poster photo was taken by photographer Takehide Niitsubo. The theme of the three heroines is "Family Tree", and it is expressed through an image of a family photo that transcends three generations of parents and children.

== TV schedule ==
Week	Episodes	Title	Directed by	Original airdate	Rating
1	1–5	1925–1939	Mojiri Adachi	November 1–5, 2021	15.5%
2	6–10	1939–1941	Mojiri Adachi	November 8–12, 2021	16.0%
3	11–15	1942–1943	Shin'ichirō Hashizume	November 15–19, 2021	15.7%
4	16–20	1943–1945	Mojiri Adachi	November 22–26, 2021	16.5%
5	21–25	1946–1948	Shin'ichirō Hashizume	November 29– December 3, 2021	17.0%
6	26–30	1948	Daisuke Futami	December 6–10, 2021	17.0%
7	31–35	1948–1951	Shin'ichirō Hashizume and Mojiri Adachi	December 13–17, 2021	16.9%
8	36–40	1951–1962	Mojiri Adachi	December 20–24, 2021	17.1%
9	41–42	1962	Mojiri Adachi	December 27–28, 2021	17.1%
10	43–47	1962	Kazufumi Matsuoka	January 3–7, 2022	15.4%
11	48–52	1962–1963	Takamasa Izunami	January 10–14, 2022	17.2%
12	53–57	1963–1964	Kazufumi Matsuoka	January 17–21, 2022	17.6%
13	58–62	1964–1965	Mojiri Adachi	January 24–28, 2022	18.0%
14	63–67	1965–1976	Daisuke Futami	January 31– February 4, 2022	18.1%
15	68–72	1976–1983	Shin'ichirō Hashizume	February 7– 11, 2022	17.6%
16	73–77	1983	Shin'ichirō Hashizume	February 14– 18, 2022	17.6%
17	78–82	1983–1984	Mojiri Aadachi	February 21– 25, 2022	17.1%
18	83–87	1984–1992	Shin'ichirō Ishikawa	February 28– March 4, 2022	17.2%
19	88–92	1992–1993	Kazufumi Matsuoka	March 7– 11, 2022	17.1%
20	93–97	1993–1994	Mojiri Aadachi	March 14– 18, 2022	18.5%
21	98–102	1994–2001	Shin'ichirō Hashizume	March 21– 25, 2022	17.5%
22	103–107	2001–2003	Takashi Fukagawa	March 28– April 1, 2022	17.9%
23	108–112	2003–2025	Mojiri Aadachi	April 4– 8, 2022	18.6%
Average rating 17.1% - Rating is based on Japanese Video Research (Kantō region).

== Awards and nominations ==
Year	Organization	Award/work	Recipient	Result	Ref.
2022	111th Television Drama Academy Awards	Best Drama	Come Come Everybody	Won	
2022	111th Television Drama Academy Awards	Best Actress	Mone Kamishiraishi	Won	
2022	111th Television Drama Academy Awards	Best Supporting Actor	Hokuto Matsumura	Won	
2022	111th Television Drama Academy Awards	Best Drama Song	Ai	Won	
2022	111th Television Drama Academy Awards	Best Scenario	Yuki Fujimoto	Won	
2022	15th Tokyo Drama Awards	Best Drama	Come Come Everybody	Nominated	
2022	15th Tokyo Drama Awards	Best Supporting Actor	Joe Odagiri	Won	
2022	15th Tokyo Drama Awards	Best Drama Song	Ai	Won	
2022	15th Tokyo Drama Awards	Best Scenario	Yuki Fujimoto	Won	

Preceded by Okaeri Mone	Asadora; November 1, 2021 – April 8, 2022	Succeeded by Chimudondon
