= Tadaichi Hirakawa =

Japanese radio announcer (1902–1993)

Tadaichi Hirakawa 平川 唯一
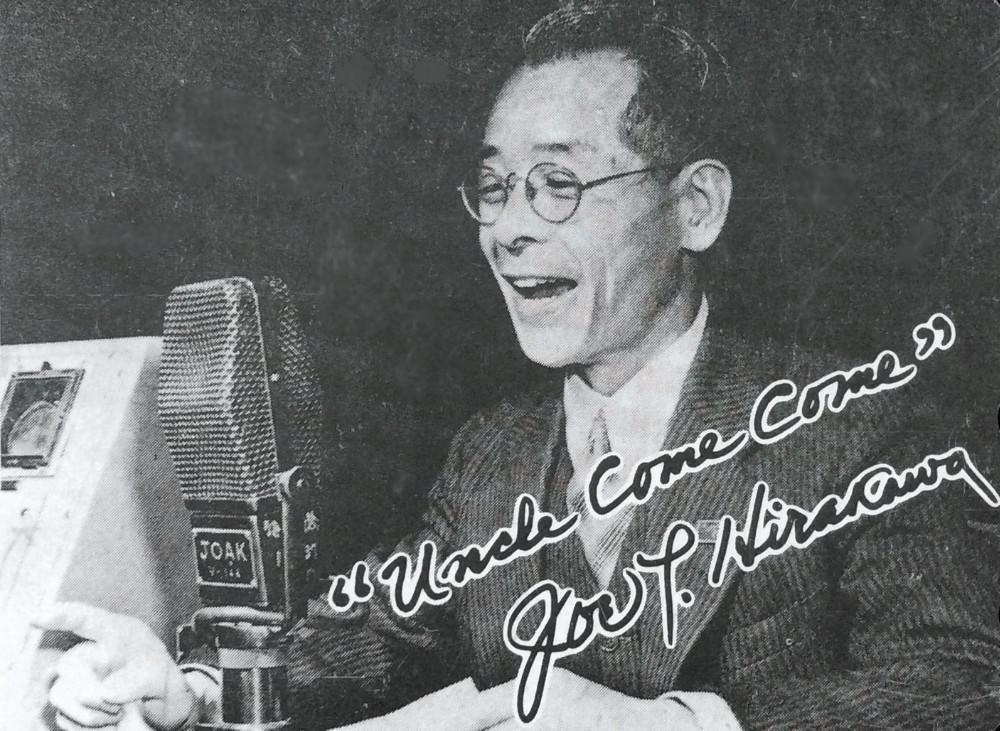
- Ca. 1947, Hirakawa on air at NHK
- Born: February 13, 1902; Okayama Prefecture, Japan
- Died: August 25, 1993 (aged 91); Tokyo, Japan
- Other names: Uncle Come Come; Joe Hirakawa
- Occupations: NHK broadcaster, actor, educator
- Years active: 1930s–1993
- Notable work: English teaching method called "Family Conversation"

Tadaichi Hirakawa (平川 唯一, February 13, 1902 – August 25, 1993) was a broadcaster and radio instructor of English conversation courses for the NHK. Nicknamed "Uncle Come Come," he was in charge of the popular radio program "English Conversation (Eikaiwa 英会話)" from 1946 to 1951. The program is also known as "Come Come English". He came from Takahashi City, Okayama Prefecture, Japan and studied in the United States before World War II. In 2021, NHK produced a TV drama, Come Come Everybody, featured Hirakawa and his life and family.

== Early life and education ==
Hirakawa was born in 1902, the second son of a farmer, in Tsugawa Village (now Takahashi City), Okayama Prefecture. After completion of the upper second grade (a secondary school course) of Tsugawa Elementary School in 1916, he engaged in family farming for some time. At the age of 17, in 1919, he followed his father who had been migrating to the United States for several years with his brothers, not knowing his ABCs. In the United States, he first worked in Portland, Oregon, for about half a year as a railroad construction worker, and then moved to Seattle, Washington, to work as a clerk at a Japanese store for half a year.

In 1919, at the age of 17, he moved in with an American family in a high-class residential area as a school boy to study English, and entered an elementary school, where he skipped grades, and graduated in three years. After completing Broadway High School (now Seattle Central College) in four years, enrolled in the University of Washington, where he switched his major from physics to theater, graduating summa cum laude from the theater department with a B.A. in 1931. As for the twelve years or so of hard study, Hirakawa said that for someone who had struggled as a farmer in his childhood, the life in which he was allowed to go to school during the day, clean his room after returning home, and study freely at night after dinner was "more of an easy life than a hard life."

== Career ==
=== In the United States ===
After graduating from the University of Washington, he became an associate pastor at St. Mary's Episcopal Church (961 S. Mariposa Avenue) in Los Angeles, working to promote Japanese and American culture, and in 1935 married Yone Takita, a native of Kanda, Tokyo, whom he met at the church. During this time, he also appeared as an actor under the name Joe Hirakawa in Hollywood films such as Madame Butterfly and The Mystery of Diamond Island (original title: Rip Roaring Riley), as well as at the Pasadena Community Playhouse (now Pasadena Playhouse).

=== In Japan ===
Returning to Japan in 1936, he applied for the English-language newscaster at NHK, where he worked for eight years until his retirement at the end of September 1945 as chief newscaster of international broadcasts. During World War II, he was involved in the war-weary propaganda against American soldiers as the head of the broadcast team in the Division of the U.S. Counterparts. At the end of the war, he translated the Hirohito surrender broadcast (玉音放送, Gyokuon-hōsō) into English and read it out by himself to the world on NHK International Broadcast (now NHK World).

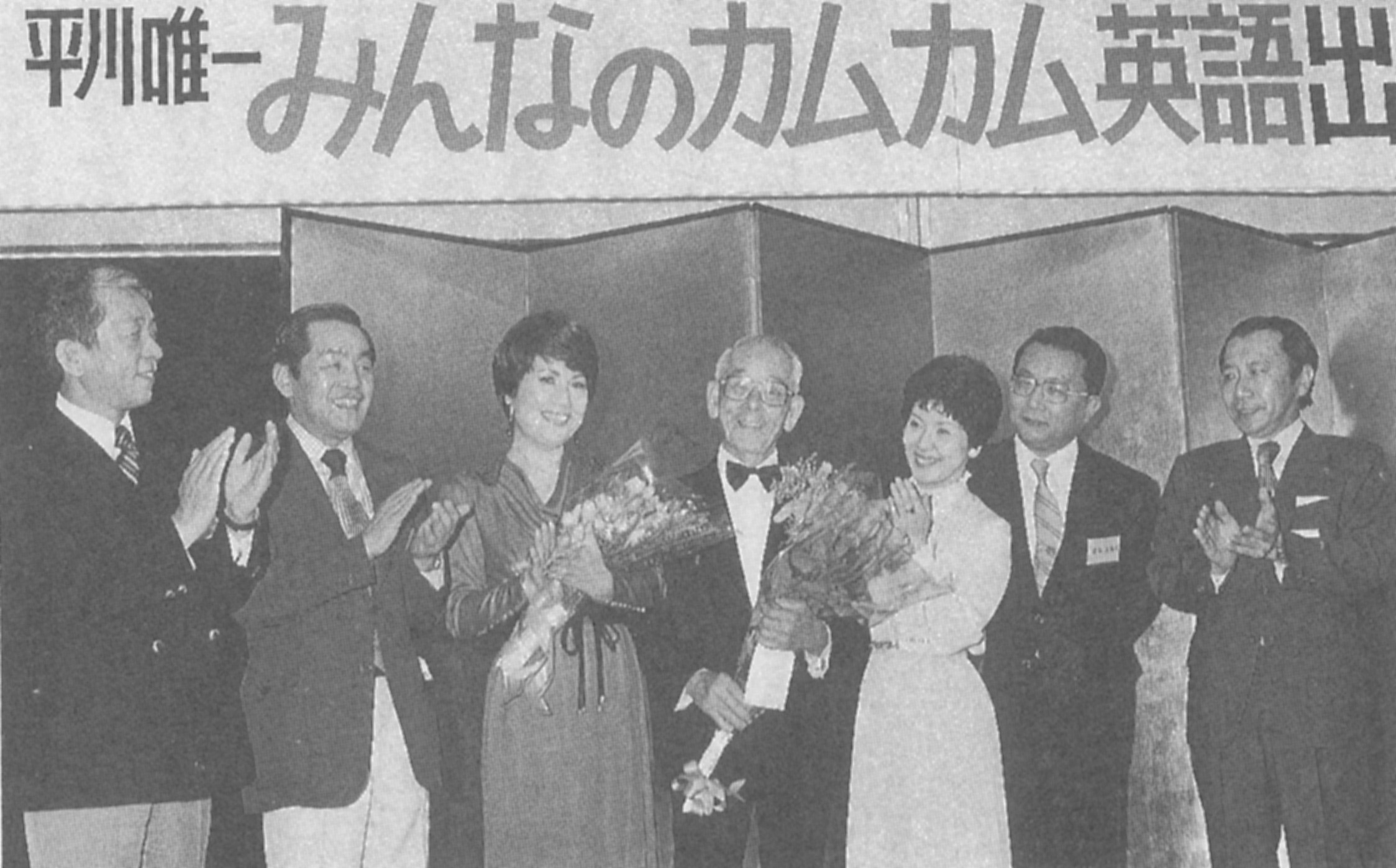
Tadaichi Hirakawa (bowtie and bouquet) and Peggy Hayama (bouquet) at the party of his publication in April 1981.

For five years from February 1946, Hirakawa was in charge of the 15-minute "English Conversation" program on NHK's First Broadcasting System at 6 pm. He wrote the theme song Come, Come, Everybody, which became a national favorite song. After retiring from NHK as "English Conversation" instructor, Hirakawa continued his "Come Come English" at the other broadcast stations: Radio Tokyo (now TBS Radio) and Nippon Cultural Broadcasting (文化放送). At the end of 1957, he was welcomed by Pacific Television (ja:太平洋テレビジョン), where he became the head of the translation department and then Vice President of the station.

Hirakawa's English conversation education has two characteristics. The first is the emphasis on family conversations, and the second is the use of Japanese furigana for pronunciation in the text.

== Personal life and family ==
Hirakawa died of pneumonia at the age of 91 in 1992. His wife was Yone よね (née: Takita 滝田) from Kanda, Tokyo, and they have two sons and two daughters. Their oldest son was Sumio 壽美雄 (1936 – 2018), born in Los Angeles, California, graduated from Everett High School in Everett, Washington, University of Washington, and New York University Law School. He was a manager of the Seattle Branch of Mitsubishi Bank. His second son, Kiyoshi 冽 (1941– ), born in Setagaya, Tokyo, is a ukulele player. He wrote a biography of his father.

Hirakawa's youngest daughter, Mary Mariko Ohno, is a traditional Japanese music (naga-uta shamisen) and dance teacher. She owns her own school known as Kabuki Academy, an American branch of Kine-ie school in Tokyo, Japan. She is known for her talents and expertise in Japanese arts and is sought after for her dance and shamisen performances. She has students all over the world. Many of them in the United States as well as several in Europe.

== In popular culture ==
Tadaichi Hirakawa is portrayed by Masashi Sada in the 2021 NHK TV drama, Come Come Everybody.

== See also ==
- Teaching English as a second or foreign language
- List of radio stations in Japan
- Hirohito surrender broadcast
