= In the Middle (Ai song) =

2021 single by Ai featuring Daichi Miura

Single by Ai featuring Daichi Miura

from the album Dream
- Language: Japanese; English
- Released: August 13, 2021
- Recorded: 2021
- Length: 4:27
- Label: EMI; Universal
- Songwriter(s): Ai Uemura; Daichi Miura
- Producer(s): Uta; Uemura; Miura

Ai singles chronology
"The Moment" (2021)	"In the Middle" (2021)	"Aldebaran" (2021)

Daichi Miura singles chronology
"Candy" (2021)	"In the Middle" (2021)	"Shinkokyu" (2021)

Music video
- "In the Middle" on YouTube

"In the Middle" (stylized in caps) is a song recorded by Japanese-American singer-songwriter Ai featuring Daichi Miura. It was released on August 13, 2021, through EMI Records and Universal Music Group.

== Background ==
In early August 2021, Ai shared an image on social media teasing her next single. A longtime friend with Miura, "In the Middle" will serve as their first collaboration. About the song, Ai commented, "There is no right, left, top, or bottom. I want to always be in the middle with the compassion that many people want to be equal, not which is worse or which is better."

== Music video ==
A music video directed by Yoshiharu Seri was released on August 13, 2021.

In a behind the scenes video, Ai commented, "This is the first music video that made me cry so much."

== Live performances ==
Ai and Miura performed the song during CDTV's live summer festival on August 16, 2021.

== Charts ==
Chart performance for "In the Middle"
Chart (2021)	Peak position
Japan Digital Singles Chart (Oricon)	41
Japan Download Songs (Billboard Japan)	42
