= Dream Tour =

2022 concert tour by Ai

- Tour by Ai
- Associated album: Dream
- Start date: May 14, 2022
- End date: December 9, 2022
- No. of shows: 33

Ai concert chronology
- It's All Me Tour (2021); Dream Tour (2022); Respect All Tour (2023–24)

The Dream Tour was the eleventh headlining concert tour by Japanese-American singer-songwriter Ai and was in support of her twelfth studio album, Dream (2022). The tour began on May 14, 2022, in Koshigaya, Japan and concluded on December 9, 2022, in Tokyo, Japan.

== Background ==
On November 1, 2022, Ai performed her final show of the It's All Me Tour at the Tokyo International Forum. On that same day, her single "Aldebaran" was released digitally, which became a moderate success in Japan. In December 2021, Ai announced the tour with limited pre-order tickets for her fan club members through January 10, 2022. A few days later, she announced her twelfth studio album, Dream. Auditions for background dancers were held from December 17 to January 3, 2022.

The tour initially was set to conclude on October 22, 2022. Additional performance dates were added for September 30, October 8 and November 4 and 6. A final tour performance was added for December 9. Choreography was handled by Riehata, Luther Brown and Elysandra Quinones.

== Concert synopsis ==
The show featured a series of special lighting effects and four dancers. Reviewers at Barks noted the highlights of the tour were "definitely the dancing". The opening number of the performance was "Not So Different". While performing "Last Words", Ai commented on the age of the song. During the performance of "Soul Train", the costumes and stage are set in a style of the 1970's. During the second half, Ai performs her English songs, including "Moriagaro" and "Let It Go". The performance closed with "We Have a Dream" from Ai's twelfth studio album, Dream. Encore performances included "Aldebaran" and "Happiness".

== Setlist ==
Setlist

This set list is representative of the show on June 5, 2022 in Matsudo. It is not intended to represent all concerts for the tour.

1. "Not So Different"
2. "Last Words"
3. "Independent Woman"
4. "Story"
5. "Dear Mama"
6. "Dear Papa"
7. "Soul Train"
8. "Moriagaro"
9. "Welcome to My City"
10. "Let It Go"
11. "We Have a Dream"

Encore

12. "Aldebaran"
13. "365"
14. "Happiness"

== Tour dates ==
Tour dates for the Dream Tour.

Date	City	Country	Venue
May 14, 2022	Koshigaya	Japan	Sun City Koshigaya City
May 21, 2022	Oita	Japan	Iichiko Gran Theater
May 22, 2022	Miyazaki	Japan	Miyazaki Shimin Bunka
June 5, 2022	Matsudo	Japan	Hall of the Forest 21
June 11, 2022	Saga	Japan	Saga City Culture Hall
June 18, 2022	Nagoya	Japan	Aichi Prefectural Art Theater
June 19, 2022	Yokkaichi	Japan	Yokkaichi City Cultural Center
June 25, 2022	Otsu	Japan	Biwako Hall
June 26, 2022	Himeji	Japan	Himeji Cultural Convention Center
July 2, 2022	Sendai	Japan	Sendai Sun Plaza
July 3, 2022	Niigata	Japan	Niigata Prefectural Civic Center
July 10, 2022	Tokyo	Japan	Tokyo International Forum
July 21, 2022	Osaka	Japan	Festival Hall
August 6, 2022	Kanazawa	Japan	Honda no Mori Hall
August 7, 2022	Takasaki	Japan	Takasaki City Theatre
August 11, 2022	Shizuoka	Japan	Shizuoka Citizens Cultural Center
August 14, 2022	Chikusei	Japan	The Hirosawa City Hall
August 20, 2022	Sapporo	Japan	Sapporo Cultural Arts Theater
August 21, 2022	Sapporo	Japan	Sapporo Cultural Arts Theater
August 27, 2022	Kagoshima	Japan	Kagoshima Arena
August 28, 2022	Kagoshima	Japan	Kagoshima Arena
September 3, 2022	Nagasaki	Japan	Nagasaki Brick Hall
September 4, 2022	Fukuoka	Japan	Fukuoka Sun Palace
September 10, 2022	Koriyama	Japan	Koriyama Cultural Center
September 17, 2022	Kanazawa	Japan	Kanagawa Kenmin Hall
September 30, 2022	Kofu	Japan	YCC Prefectural Citizen's Culture Hall
October 8, 2022	Nagoya	Japan	Nagoya Congress Center
October 15, 2022	Morioka	Japan	Morioka Shimin Bunka Hall
October 16, 2022	Aomori	Japan	Link Station Hall Aomori
October 22, 2022	Hiroshima	Japan	Hiroshima Bunka Gakuen HBG Hall
November 4, 2022	Sakai	Japan	Fenice Sacay
November 6, 2022	Kyoto	Japan	ROHM Theatre Kyoto
December 9, 2022	Tokyo	Japan	Tokyo International Forum
