= The Moment (Ai song) =

2021 single by Ai featuring Yellow Bucks

Single by Ai featuring Yellow Bucks

from the album Dream
- Released: June 28, 2021
- Recorded: 2021
- Genre: J-pop; pop rap
- Length: 3:22
- Label: EMI; Universal
- Songwriters: Ai Uemura; Kazu Sakaguchi
- Producers: Uemura; DJ Ryow; Space Dust Club

Ai singles chronology
"Not So Different" (2020)	"The Moment" (2021)	"In the Middle" (2021)

Yellow Bucks singles chronology
"Go Ahead" (2021)	"The Moment" (2021)	"Check Me Out" (2021)

Music video
- "The Moment" on YouTube

"The Moment" (stylized in capital letters) is a song recorded by Japanese-American singer-songwriter Ai, featuring Japanese rapper Yellow Bucks. Written by Ai and Yellow Bucks, it was released on June 28, 2021 by EMI Records and Universal Music Group.

== Background ==
Ai previously appeared on producer DJ Ryow's "Never Change" from his 2021 studio album, Still Dreamin'. In mid-June, Ai shared photos of herself in a recording studio on various social media. She officially announced the single on June 21, 2021 and shared an excerpt of the song on her YouTube channel.

== Release and promotion ==
"The Moment" was released digitally as a single on June 28, 2021. Ai performed the song with Yellow Bucks and DJ Ryow on CDTV, a Japanese TV channel by TBS.

== Music video ==
A music video for "The Moment" was released on July 5, 2021. Directed by Yue, it starred Ai, Yellow Bucks, DJ Ryow, Riehata, Thelma Aoyama, Luna, Sid, and Tee. Throughout the video, Ai and Yellow Bucks are seen singing and rapping throughout various locations in a city.

== Release history ==
Release history and formats for "The Moment"
Region	Date	Format(s)	Label	Ref.
Various	June 28, 2021	Digital download; streaming	EMI; Universal	
