= Aldebaran (song) =

2021 single by Ai

Single by Ai

from the album Dream
- Language: Japanese; English
- Released: October 4, 2021
- Recorded: 2021
- Genre: Orchestral
- Length: 4:26 (original version); 2:52 (radio version)
- Label: EMI
- Songwriter: Naotarō Moriyama
- Producers: Neko Saito; Ai Uemura

Ai singles chronology
"In the Middle" (2021)	"Aldebaran" (2021)	"Start Again" (2022)

Music video
- "Aldebaran" on YouTube

"Aldebaran" (アルデバラン, Arudebaran) is a song recorded by Japanese-American singer-songwriter Ai. Initially released to radio on October 4, 2021, the song was later released digitally on November 1, 2021, via EMI Records. "Aldebaran" served as the theme song for the Japanese television drama, Come Come Everybody and subsequently served as the third single from Ai's twelfth studio album, Dream.

Upon its release, "Aldebaran" received critical acclaim from critics for its composition and lyrics. The song debuted and peaked at number 37 on the Billboard Japan Hot 100 and number 6 on the Oricon Digital Singles Chart. In May 2022, "Aldebaran" was certified Gold by the Recording Industry Association of Japan.

== Background ==
Aldebaran
A 24-second sample of "Aldebaran". The song was Ai's first to chart on the Billboard Japan Hot 100 since her 2017 single "Kira Kira"

It's a song I want to convey to people who are working hard in this era, with the life of the main character of the drama, and in this era, various things are happening...

— Ai's thoughts on the lyrics of Aldebaran

On September 27, 2021, Ai announced on her social media of a song she recorded for an upcoming NHK TV series. Written by Naotarō Moriyama and featuring arrangements by Neko Saito, the song is named after the star of the same name in the Taurus constellation. Regarding the song, Mone Kamishiraishi, one of the actresses to be in the film, commented that the song was "beautiful" and "nice and encouraging". Eri Fukatsu also commented she was wary of Ai's recording but stated, "My heart was shaken, robbed and filled." Actress Rina Kawaei, also an actress in the film, commented that she was "impressed by the gentle singing and the wonderful lyrics". The song was originally written by Moriyama on New Years in 2021 about environmental issues and was originally titled "Daphnia Pulex". "Aldebaran" was not intended to be the theme song for Come Come Everybody until Moriyama allowed Ai to record the song with reworked lyrics.

== Promotion ==
To promote "Aldebaran", Ai was to appear on NHK's Utacon to preview the song on September 28, 2021, however the event was cancelled and moved to October 4 due to an emergency deceleration. Universal Japan issued a compilation chapter titled Self Selection "Piano Ballad" on the same day the single was announced. On TikTok, a 30 second television version was released to the service. On October 4, a radio edit of "Aldebaran" was sent to Japanese radio stations. An official audio of the radio edit was uploaded to Ai's YouTube channel. On October 26, Ai performed the song on an NHK broadcast show.

== Commercial performance ==
"Aldebaran" debuted at number 5 on the Oricon Daily Digital Singles chart on November 2. The song later peaked at number 4 on the Daily Digital Singles chart. On the weekly Oricon Digital Singles chart, "Aldebaran" debuted at number 11. For the week of November 16, 2021, "Aldebaran" reached a new peak at number 6 with 8,331 total downloads. On the Billboard Japan Hot 100, "Aldebaran" debuted and peaked at number 37. "Aldebaran" marked Ai's first appearance on the Billboard Japan Hot 100 since her 2017 single, "Kira Kira". In March 2022, "Aldebaran" peaked at number 12 on the Billboard Japan Top User Generated Songs chart. The song was later ranked at number 29 on the Billboard Japan Top Download Songs year-end chart for 2022.

== Accolades ==
Year	Organization	Award/work	Result	Ref.
2022	The Television Drama Academy Awards	Best Drama Song	Won	
2022	15th Tokyo Drama Awards	Theme Song Award	Won	

== Music video ==
A music video for "Aldebaran" was announced on October 25, 2021, and premiered on YouTube on November 5.

== Live performances ==
Ai performed "Aldebaran" on the day of its release during her 20th anniversary tour It's All Me at the Tokyo International Forum Hall. Ai performed "Aldebaran" at the 72nd NHK Kōhaku Uta Gassen on December 31, her fourth appearance on the show. Ai appeared on 193rd episode of The First Take, a YouTube channel where singers perform a song recorded in one take. She performed an excerpt of "Story" prior to "Aldebaran". It marked her first appearance on the channel.

== Credits and personnel ==
Credits adapted from Dream liner notes and Tidal.

- Ai Carina Uemura – lead vocals, production
- Naotarō Moriyama – songwriting
- Neko Saito – production, arranging
- Midorin – drums
- Tomohiko Ohkanda – bass
- Fumio Yanagisawa – guitar
- Satoshi Onoue – guitar
- Hideaki "Lanbsy" Sakai – latin percussion
- Tomoyuki Asakawa – harp
- Great Eida – concertmaster, strings
- Jo Kuwata – violin
- Nagisa Kiriyama – violin
- Haruko Yano – violin
- Yukinori Murata – violin
- Akane Irie – violin
- Ayumu Koshikawa – violin
- Akiko Maruyama – violin
- Yui Kaneko – violin
- Masahiro Miyake – violin
- Yuji Yamada – viola
- Mayu Takashima – viola
- Ayano Kasahara – cello
- Yoshihiko Maeda – cello
- Taiji Okuda – mixing
- Randy Merrill – mastering

== Charts ==
=== Weekly charts ===
2021 chart performance for "Aldebaran"
Chart (2021)	Peak position
Japan Hot 100 (Billboard Japan)	37
Japan Digital Singles Chart (Oricon)	6

2023 chart performance for "Aldebaran"
Chart (2023)	Peak position
Japan Top Download Songs (Billboard Japan)	72

=== Year-end charts ===
Year-end chart performance for "Aldebaran"
Chart (2022)	Position
Japan Top Download Songs (Billboard Japan)	29

== Certifications ==
Certifications for "Aldebaran"
Region	Certification	Certified units/sales
Japan (RIAJ) Single track	Gold	100,000^{*}
Streaming
Japan (RIAJ)	Gold	50,000,000^{†}
^{*} Sales figures based on certification alone.^{†} Streaming-only figures based on certification alone.

== Release history ==
Release history and formats for "Aldebaran"
Region	Date	Format	Version	Label	Ref.
Japan	October 4, 2021	Radio airplay	Radio edit	Universal Japan	
Various	November 1, 2021	Digital download; streaming	Original	EMI; Universal	
Various	March 11, 2022	Digital download; streaming	First Take	EMI; Universal	
