= Dōmoto =

Dōmoto, Domoto or Doumoto (written: 堂本) is a Japanese surname. Notable people with the surname include:

- Akiko Dōmoto (堂本 暁子; born 1932), Japanese politician
- Inshō Dōmoto (堂本 印象; 1891–1975), Japanese painter
- Kaneji Domoto (堂本 兼次; 1912–2002), Japanese architect and landscape architect
- Koichi Domoto (堂本 光一; born 1979), Japanese idol, singer-songwriter, composer, lyricist, television personality, voice actor and actor
- Tsuyoshi Domoto (堂本 剛; born 1979), Japanese idol, singer, songwriter, actor and television personality

== See also ==
- Domoto (band), a Japanese music duo formerly known as KinKi Kids
- 4975 Dohmoto, a main-belt asteroid
