= Daichi Miura =

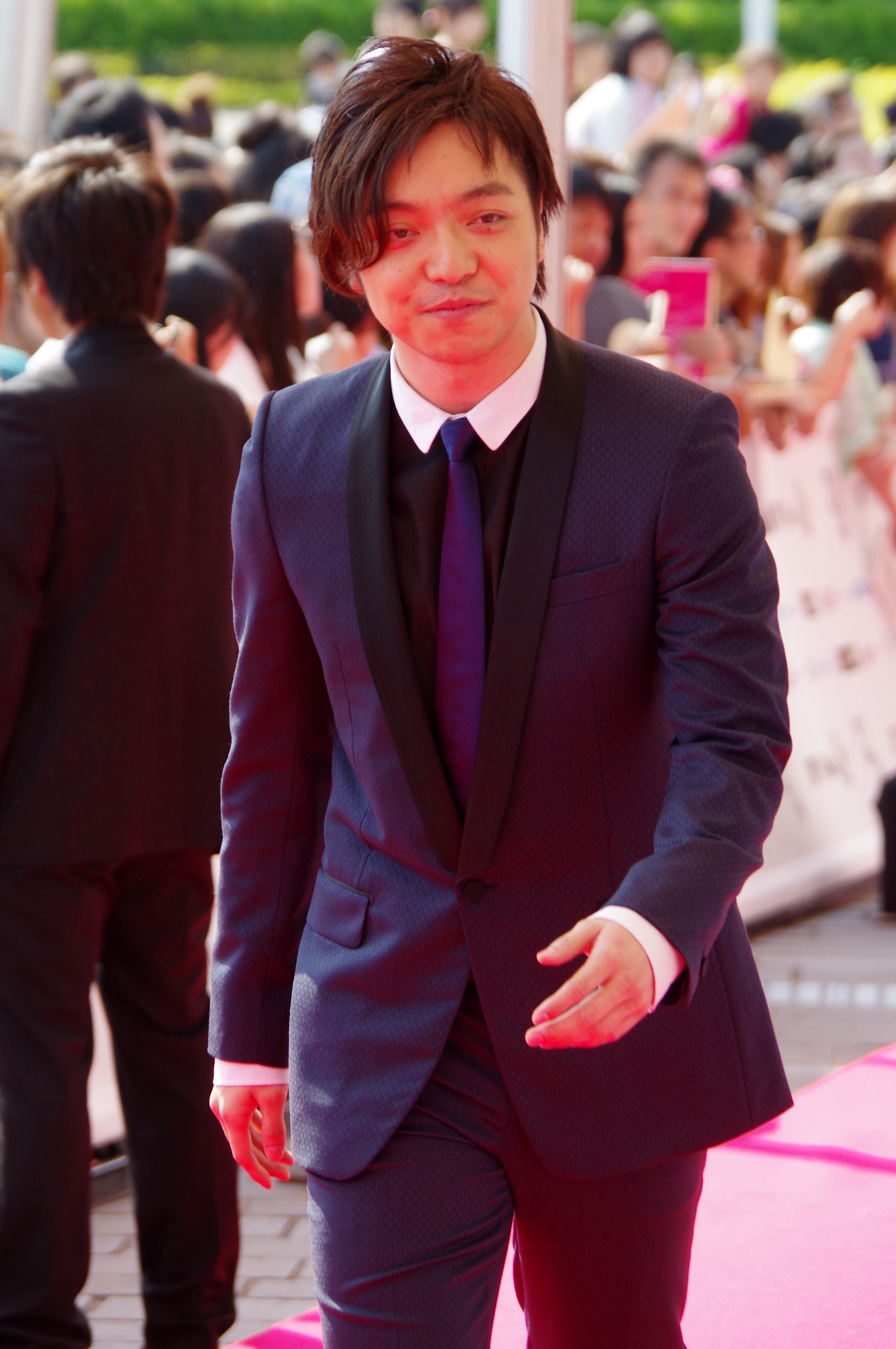
- Miura at the 2014 MTV Video Music Awards Japan

Background information
- Born: Daichi Miura; 24 August 1987 (age 39); Okinawa, Japan
- Genres: Pop; R&B; dance; Progressive House; Dubstep; Drumstep; Future Bass
- Occupations: Singer-songwriter; dancer; choreographer
- Instruments: Vocals; piano; guitar
- Years active: 1997–present
- Labels: Sonic Groove; Rising Production

Daichi Miura (三浦 大知, Miura Daichi; born 24 August 1987) is a Japanese singer, songwriter, dancer, and choreographer. He also directs his own concerts. He belongs to Rising Production and has a record contract with Avex. He is from Okinawa Prefecture, Japan. He has an official fan club called "Daichishiki" (大知識).

== Music ==
=== Influences ===
When Miura was eight years old, he bought a CD for the first time (HIStory by Michael Jackson). Daichi Miura, like Michael Jackson, debuted as a child and later became a solo artist. When Miura saw Jackson dance in various countries on the video of "Black or White", he noticed Jackson kept his uniqueness in everything. Although still a child, Miura admired Jackson's originality. He later said he aspired to climb a different mountain but reach the same height as Jackson.

During the hiatus after leaving the group Folder, Miura was given an Usher album by a staff member. The style of Usher's dancing and singing became the foundation for his solo career. Miura has also mentioned Justin Timberlake as one of his influences. In addition, the lyrics of "Chicken Rice" written by Hitoshi Matsumoto taught him the artistic possibilities of Japanese language.

=== Live performances ===
During his solo concerts, while singing, he has played piano, acoustic guitar, drums, and cajón. He also performed using Ableton Push.

== Career ==
=== Before debut ===
When Miura was six, his mother saw him dance to the theme songs of TV shows such as various anime, The Super Sentai Series, and Kamen Rider. This gave her the idea of bringing him to the Okinawa Actors' School. At the school, they taught him to sing and dance. In 1996, a television program (NHK Education's Yumediago Kodomojuku) featured Miura commuting to the dance school 90 minutes by bus from home. Due to Miura's father's job as a member of Self-Defense Force, the family moved often. First they moved to another part of Okinawa, then to Etajima in Hiroshima. Before Miura left the group Folder, they moved to Ayase city in Kanagawa.

=== Debut as a member of Folder ===
In 1997, Miura started his career as a member of Folder. At age nine, he debuted as the main vocalist "DAICHI" and the group released the single "Parachuter". He also became a regular in the TV show Ponkikkies. Afterwards, as "Daichi Miura", he released solo singles such as "Big Heart ~Theme of Microman~" .

In 2000, he took a hiatus from Folder due to his voice change. The group's name was changed to Folder5. (Miura did not participate in Folder5.) During the hiatus, Miura refrained from voice training and concentrated on dance practice. During the same period, he went to a junior high school where he became a member of the volleyball team (it involved harsh physical training).

=== 2004: Comeback concert as Daichi Miura ===
On 1 August 2004, at Harajuku Astro Hall (VISION FESTA vol.2), he changed his stage name back to Daichi Miura and held a comeback concert.

In the summer of 2004, J.Que (Patrick J.Que Smith, the composer of Usher's "Yeah!") came to Japan to write songs for Miura. During the week in the studio, they produced a few songs together. Miura was amazed by Smith's world class songwriting. J.Que nicknamed Miura "D-ROCK".

On 9 December 2004, Miura traveled to Los Angeles to shoot the music video of the debut song "Keep It Goin' On".

On 16 December 2004, Miura danced with top dancers including the backup dancers for Beyonce, Usher etc. as well as the hip hop dancer Crazy Legs of Rock Steady Crew in his music video.

=== 2005–2006: Solo debut with D-Rock with U ===
==== 2005 ====
On 19 January, at Shibuya O-WEST, the first solo concert Chapter-O was held.

On 30 March, the first solo debut single "Keep It Goin' On" was released. Miura said "I want to popularize a solo style of R&B singing and dancing that is still rare in Japan".

On 1 April, he was chosen as the first "Advance Artist" by MTV's Advanced Warning.

On 22 April, Chapter-1 national tour started.

On 1 June, the 2nd single "Free Style" was released.

On 17 July, the solo concert Summer Seminar 2005 ~Eve of Marine Day Festival~ was held.

On 12 October, the 3rd single "Southern Cross" was released.

==== 2006 ====
On 11 January, the 4th single "No Limit featuring Utamaru (from RHYMESTER)" was released.

On 25 January, the first album D-ROCK with U was released.

On 5 February, the live tour Chapter-2 D-ROCK with U started.

On 29 March, the live DVD LIVE D-ROCK with U ~DAICHI MIURA LIVE Chapter-2~ was released.

The monthly concert D-ROCK JAM started.

=== 2007–2009: Who's the Man ===
==== 2007 ====
On 29 April, the national tour covering eight cities started.

ON 18 July, the 5th single "Flag" was released.

On 29 July, Miura performed at the anniversary event of the legendary breaking and hip hop group Rock Steady Crew 30th Anniversary in New York.

On 24 August, SUMMER SEMINAR '07 ~Jump into the 20th~ was held.

On 22 November, Miura performed on the popular TV dance program Super Chample. The show featured Chris Brown as a guest and Daichi danced his own choreography to "Gimme That" in front of Chris Brown himself.

==== 2008 ====
On 9 July, the 12-inch analog record including the remix of "Inside Your Head" by FORCE OF NATURE's DJ KENT was released.

On 23 July, the 6th single "Inside Your Head" was released. Starting with this song, Miura continued to choreograph most of his own songs. He also started writing music and lyrics frequently for himself around this time.

On 26 November, the remix CD WHAT'S R&B? that included the remix of "Inside Your Head" by DJ KOMIRI was released.

==== 2009 ====
On 11 Feb., the 7th single "Your Love feat. KREVA" was released.

On 20 May, the 8th single "Delete My Memories" was released.

On 18 July, the solo concert SUMMER SEMINAR ~Encore of Our Love was held. KREVA was invited as a guest.

On 16 September, the second album Who's The Man and the concert DVD DAICHI MIURA LIVE 2009 -Encore of Our Love- was released simultaneously. The concert event at LAZONA Kawasaki was held.

On 18 October, the national tour Who's The Man started.

On 9 December, Mellow Disney -R&B Revisited- in which Miura participated was released.

On 29 December, J-WAVE YEAH END SPECIAL LIVE DAICHI MIURA "Who's The Man; Returns" was held.

=== 2010–2011: D.M. ===
==== 2010 ====
On 1 February, Miura was nominated for SPACE SHOWER MUSIC VIDEO AWARDS 10 in THE BEST CHOREOGRAPHY category.

On 10 February, BoA's album IDENTITY including "Possibility duet with Daichi Miura" was released.

In May, the solo concert DAICHI MIURA LIVE 2010 ~Emotion~ was held.

On 18 August, the 9th single "The Answer" was released.

In August, the live concert DAICHI MIURA SUMMER SEMINAR'10 ~The Answer?~ was held.

On 31 October, the concert tour in 10 cities DAICHI MIURA LIVE TOUR 2010 ~GRAVITY~ started.

On 15 December, the 10th single "Lullaby" was released.

On 29 December, YEAR END SPECIAL LIVE DAICHI MIURA "Zero GRAVITY" was held.

==== 2011 ====
On 9 March, the lecca's mini album Hakofune -ballads in me- including the collaboration song "First Sight feat. Daichi Miura" was released.

On 3 August, The SUGAR SHACK FAMILY's album SUGAR SHACK FACTORY featuring Miura was released.

On 6 August, the national tour DAICHI MIURA LIVE TOUR 2011 ~Synesthesia~ started.

On 24 August, the 11th single "Turn Off The Light" was released. The song was written by lecca.

On 8 September, the KREVA's album GO including "Shinkirō featuring Daichi Miura" was released.

On 30 November, the third album D.M. was released.

On 14 December, the charity song "H♡PE" featuring Miura was released.

=== 2012–2013: Nippon Budokan concert and The Entertainer ===
==== 2012 ====
On 2 May, the 12th single "Two Hearts" was released. "Two Hearts" was used as the theme song of the drama series Answer~Keishicho Kensho Sousakan. This was the first time Miura's song was used for a drama.

On 3 May, the first Nippon Budokan concert was held.

On 12 December, the 13th single "Right Now/Voice" was released.

==== 2013 ====
On 10 July, the 14th single "Go for It" was released.

On 31 July and 1 August, Miura participated in Quincy Jones's The 80th Celebration Live in JAPAN at The Tokyo International Forum.

On 8 September, the first Yokohama Arena concert was held. 12,000 people attended.

On 20 November, the 4th album, The Entertainer, was released.

=== 2014–2015: Fever ===
==== 2014 ====
On 5 March, the 15th single "Anchor" was released. "Anchor" was used as the theme song of the drama Yoru no Sensei.

On 14 March, the Western music cover album Covers EP was released.

On 1 April, the national tour DAICHI MIURA LIVE TOUR 2014 - THE ENTERTAINER started.

On 18 June, KREVA's 'Best Of' album KX including "Zensokuryoku (feat. Daichi Miura)" was released.

On 23 October, Miura won the MTV EMA 2014 Best Japan Act.

On 3 December, the 16th single "Fureau dakede ~Always with you~/IT'S THE RIGHT TIME" was released.

==== 2015 ====
On 25 February, the 17th single "Unlock" was released.

On 28 February and 1 March, LIVE -En Dance Studio × Daichi Miura- was held.

On 1 April, the DREAM COMES TRUE's cover album WATASHI TO DORIKAMU 2 -DORIKAMU WONDERLAND 2015 KAISAI KINEN BEST COVERS- including Miura's cover of "Mirai Yosouzu II" was released.

On 17 June, the 18th single "music" was released.

On 2 September, the 5th album, FEVER, was released.

On 10 September, the national tour DAICHI MIURA LIVE TOUR 2015 "FEVER" started.

22 - 23 November, Miura participated in the nation's largest scale street dance event Shibuya Street Dance Week 2015. This event was produced by SHOTA, one of Miura's exclusive dancers. Miura's song "music" was used as the theme song of the event.

=== 2016–2017: First appearance on Music Station and Kohaku Uta Gassen, Hit album ===
==== 2016 ====
On 30 March, the 19th single "Cry & Fight" was released.

On 6 May, Miura appeared on Music Station (Asahi TV) for the first time.

On 15 September, the national tour DAICHI MIURA LIVE TOUR 2016 (RE)PLAY started.

On 4 November, the music video of the 20th single "(RE)PLAY" was released.

On 23 November, the 20th single "(RE)PLAY" was released.

==== 2017 ====
On 18 January, the 21st single "EXCITE" was released. "EXCITE" was used as the theme song of the TV drama series Kamen Rider Ex-Aid.

On 22 January 12,000 people attended the special encore concert from the (RE)PLAY tour at Yoyogi National Gymnasium. On the same date, Miura appeared on the KanJam Kanzen Nen SHOW.

On 22 March, the 6th album, Hit, and the concert DVD DAICHI MIURA LIVE TOUR 2016 (RE)PLAY was released simultaneously.

On 15 April, Miura participated in the concert event AbemaTV 1st ANNIVERSARY LIVE.

On 13 May, the invitational concert Daichi Miura X TSUTAYA Premium Acoustic Live was held.

On 2 August, the 22nd single "U" was released. "U" was used as the theme song of the drama Nou ni Sumaho ga Umerareta!.

On 16 September, the national tour Daichi Miura Best Hit Tour 2017 started.

On 14 October, Miura was featured on the TV show "Okamura Offer Series" of Mechax2 Iketeru! (Fuji TV).

On 31 December, Miura performed on the 68th NHK Kōhaku Uta Gassen (NHK) for the first time.

=== 2018–present: Best and Kyutai (Sphere) ===
==== 2018 ====
On 20 February, Miura appeared on the cover of Music Magazine, March issue.

On 7 March, the first 'Best Of' album BEST was released.

From April, Miura was featured in the promotional contents as a campaign character for NHK World Japan on NHK World.

On 9 May, the SOIL&"PIMP" SESSION's album DRAPPER including "comrade feat. Daichi Miura" was released.

On 11 July, the album Kyutai (Sphere) was released.

On 22 August, the 23rd single "Be Myself" was released.

On 22 September, the national tour DAICHI MIURA LIVE TOUR 2018 ONE END started.

On 26 September, the Lekishi's 6th album, Mukishi, including "GOEMON feat. Bigmonzaemon (Daichi Miura)" was released.

On 10 October, Miura participated as a guest on the Apple Music's original show Tokyo, Music & Us 2017-2018 hosted by Kenji Ozawa.

On 19 December, the 24th single "Blizzard" was released. "Blizzard" was used as the theme song of the animation film Dragon Ball Super: Broly.

On 31 December, Miura participated in the 69th NHK Kohaku Uta Gassen for the second time.

==== 2019 ====
On 7 February, the encore arena concert tour DAICHI MIURA LIVE TOUR 2018-2019 ONE END started.

In February, Miura became the ambassador for the sports brand New Balance.

On 24 February, Miura participated in The Commemoration Ceremony of the Thirtieth Anniversary of His Majesty the Emperor's Accession to the Throne, held by the Japanese government. Miura sang "Utagoe no Hibiki" (Lyrics written by the Emperor Akihito, Music composed by the Empress Michiko) to commemorate.

On 12 June, the 25th single "Katasumi/Corner" and the concert DVD DAICHI MIURA LIVE TOUR ONE END in Osaka-jo Hall were released.

On 29 July, Miura participated in the ASEAN-Japan Music Festival 2019 in VIETNAM—prayer for peace—. The event was produced by the actor Ryotaro Sugi who is also the Japan-Vietnam and the Japan-ASEAN Special Ambassador.

On 1 August, the new campaign "Runs in the Family" by New Balance featuring the brand ambassador Daichi Miura and the supporting dancers started.

On 16–18 August, Miura performed at the Reading Orchestra Concert ~Hikari wo Kike~: Riku Onda's Honeybees and Distant Thunder, winner of the Naoki Award and Bookstore.

On 12 September, at Tokyo Game Show 2019, it was announced that Miura would appear as one of the preppers in the video game DEATH STRANDING by director Kojima Hideo, (8 November release).

From 21 September, starting from the Makuhari Event Hall in Chiba, to 5 November at Yoyogi National Gymnasium in Tokyo (a the total of four venues), six arena concerts of DAICHI MIURA LIVE TOUR 2019-2020 COLORLESS were held.

On 31 December, Miura performed on the 70th NHK Kohaku Uta Gassen for the third time.

==== 2020 ====
On 15 January, the 26th single "I'm Here" was released. "I'm Here" was written for the TBS Friday Drama Series Byoshitsu de Nembutsu o Tonaenaide Kudasai. On 31 January, its music video was released on YouTube.

On 31 January, the encore hall concert tour DAICHI MIURA LIVE TOUR 2019-2020 COLORLESS started.

On 28 February, Miura started singing on Instagram on the dates DAICHI MIURA LIVE TOUR 2019-2020 COLORLESS was scheduled but was postponed indefinitely for the fans who were planning to go to his concerts. Later, he started a project titled "1 Song Home Live" where he released a video of himself singing one song at his home on each concert date.

On 18 March, DJ DAISHIZEN Presents Daichi Miura NON STOP DJ MIX Vol.2 was released.

On 9 April, due to the spread of COVID-19, 31 shows (out of 36) from DAICHI MIURA LIVE TOUR 2019-2020 COLORLESS tour from 28 February to 17 June were indefinitely postponed.

From 29 April to 28 May, DAICHI MIURA LIVE TOUR ONE END in Osakajo Hall was viewable on YouTube as a part of the event titled YouTube Music Week STAY HOME #Withme.

On 17 June, DAICHI MIURA LIVE TOUR COLORLESS at Yoyogi National Gymnasium was released digitally on Amazon Prime Video.

On 18 June, the digital distribution of "Yours" started.

On 7 July, the digital distribution of "Negaiboshi" (a collaboration song with Ayaka) started.

On 23 July, "Sphere" Solo Performance was shown on YouTube Premiere for the second time. On 24 August (Miura's birthday), "Yours" Choreo Video was released.

On 10 September, Miura became the ambassador for Shibuya StreetDance Week 2020. "Yours" was used as the theme song.

On 29 September, it was announced that "Not Today" is the tie-in song for BS-NHK's Parasports animation project "AnimeXPara" Wheelchair Basketball Edition.

On 10 October, his first online concert DAICHI MIURA Online LIVE The Choice is_____ was held.

On 11 November, the 27th single "Antelope" was released. The single contains two other tracks: "Yours" and "Not Today".

== Image ==
He often writes the lyrics and music to his songs, himself. Most of his songs were choreographed by himself since "Inside Your Head" was released.

== Personal life ==
Miura announced his marriage to a non-celebrity woman on 1 January 2015. His first son was born on 9 December 2016.

== Discography ==
=== Studio albums ===
List of studio albums, with selected chart positions
Title	Album details	Peak chart positions		Sales
Title	Album details	JPN Oricon	JPN Billboard	Sales
D-Rock with U	Released: 25 January 2006; Label: Sonic Groove; Format: CD	18	—	JPN: 12,815
Who's the Man	Released: 16 September 2009; Label: Sonic Groove; Formats: CD, digital download	27	—	JPN: 5,604
D.M.	Released: 30 November 2011; Label: Sonic Groove; Formats: CD, digital download	7	—	JPN: 25,776
The Entertainer	Released: 20 November 2013; Label: Sonic Groove; Formats: CD, digital download	5	—	JPN: 34,868
Fever	Released: 2 September 2015; Label: Sonic Groove; Formats: CD, digital download	3	4	JPN: 24,713
Hit	Released: 22 March 2017; Label: Sonic Groove; Formats: CD, digital download	4	3	JPN: 59,503
Kyuutai (球体;, Sphere)	Released: 11 July 2018; Label: Sonic Groove; Formats: CD, digital download	5	4	JPN: 21,533
Over	Released: 14 February 2024; Label: Sonic Groove; Formats: CD, digital download	6	6	
"—" denotes items which did not chart.

=== Compilation albums ===
List of compilation albums, with selected chart positions
Title	Album details	Peak chart positions		Sales	Certifications
Title	Album details	JPN Oricon	JPN Billboard	Sales	Certifications
DJ Daishizen Presents Daichi Miura Non Stop DJ Mix (DJ 大自然 Presents 三浦大知 Non Stop DJ Mix)	Released: 17 February 2016; Label: Sonic Groove; Format: Digital download	—	—	—N/a	
Best	Released: 7 March 2018; Label: Sonic Groove; Formats: CD, LP, digital download	1	1	JPN: 104,480	RIAJ: Gold
DJ Daishizen Presents Daichi Miura Non Stop DJ Mix Vol.2 (DJ Daishizen Presents 三浦大知 Non Stop DJ Mix Vol.2)	Released: 18 March 2020; Label: Sonic Groove; Formats: CD, digital download	18	14	JPN: 5,045	
Archive	Released: 25 March 2026; Label: Sonic Groove; Formats: 3×CD, digital download	14	—	JPN: 4,151	
"—" denotes items which did not chart.

=== Extended plays ===
List of extended plays, with selected details
Title	EP details
Covers EP	Released: 14 March 2014; Label: Sonic Groove; Format: Digital download

=== Singles ===
List of singles, with selected chart positions and certifications
Title	Year	Peak chart positions		Sales	Certifications	Notes	Album
Title	Year	JPN Oricon	JPN Hot 100	Sales	Certifications	Notes	Album
"Big Heart"	1999	—	—	—N/a		OP for the anime Microman: The Small Giant.	Non-album single
"Keep It Going' On"	2005	14	—	JPN: 24,542			D-Rock with U
"Free Style"	2005	19	—	JPN: 15,102			D-Rock with U
"Southern Cross"	2005	34	—	JPN: 3,061			D-Rock with U
"No Limit" (featuring Utamaru of Rhymester)	2006	29	—	JPN: 2,714		Image song for the video game Project Gotham Racing 3.	D-Rock with U
"Flag"	2007	62	—	—N/a			Who's The Man
"Everlasting Love 2007"	2007	—	—	—N/a		Digital distribution only.	Non-album single
"Inside Your Head"	2008	48	—	JPN: 2,291			Who's The Man
"Your Love" (featuring Kreva)	2009	20	20	JPN: 3,800			Who's The Man
"Delete My Memories"	2009	36	86	JPN: 3,414			Who's The Man
"The Answer"	2010	24	25	JPN: 6,601			D.M.
"Lullaby"	2010	16	12	JPN: 6,767			D.M.
"Turn Off the Light"	2011	16	34	JPN: 8,114			D.M.
"Two Hearts"	2012	9	6	JPN: 20,167			The Entertainer
"Right Now / Voice"	2012	7	15	JPN: 23,702			The Entertainer
"Go for It"	2013	8	14	JPN: 24,095			The Entertainer
"Anchor"	2014	7	22	JPN: 18,329			Fever
"Fureau Dake De –Always with You– / It's the Right Time" (ふれあうだけで 〜Always with You〜 / It's the Right Time)	2014	6	23	JPN: 17,736 (CD); JPN: 100,000 (DL)	RIAJ (DL): Gold	"It's the Right Time" as ED for the anime Parasyte –The Maxim–.	Fever
"Unlock"	2015	8	17	JPN: 13,271		OP for the Japanese drama Ghost Writer.	Fever
"Music"	2015	11	17	JPN: 14,272			Fever
"Cry & Fight"	2016	9	8	JPN: 15,990			Hit
"(Re)Play"	2016	10	12	JPN: 16,030 (CD); JPN: 100,000 (DL)	RIAJ (DL): Gold		Hit
"Excite"	2017	1	2	JPN: 45,639 (CD); JPN: 250,000 (DL)	RIAJ (DL): Platinum; RIAJ (streaming): Gold	OP for the Japanese tokusatsu drama Kamen Rider Ex-Aid.	Hit
"U"	2017	8	8	JPN: 15,143			Best
"Be Myself"	2018	12	11	JPN: 12,742			Non-album singles
"Blizzard"	2018	4	2	JPN: 22,826 (CD); JPN: 100,000 (DL)	RIAJ (DL): Gold	Theme song for the anime film Dragon Ball Super: Broly.	Non-album singles
"Katasumi / Corner" (片隅 / Corner)	2019	12	22	—N/a			Non-album singles
"I'm Here"	2020	6	23	JPN: 16,228			Non-album singles
"Antelope"	2020	3	—	JPN: 11,516 (CD)			Non-album singles
"Backwards"	2021	7	47	JPN: 9,655 (CD)			Non-album singles
"San San"	2022	—	1				Non-album singles
"Horizon Dreamer" / "Polytope"	2025	9	—	JPN: 7,919 (CD)			Non-album singles
"Original Fake"	2026	—	45				I Know I Don't Know
"—" denotes items which did not chart.

=== Videography ===
Title	Released	Details
LIVE D-ROCK with U ~DAICHI MIURA LIVE Chapter-2~ @Shibuya AX 5th February	29 March 2006	Formats: DVD
DAICHI MIURA LIVE 2009 -Encore of Our Love-	16 September 2009	Formats: DVD
DAICHI MIURA LIVE TOUR 2010 ~GRAVITY~	25 May 2011	Formats: DVD, BD
DAICHI MIURA LIVE TOUR 2011 ~Synesthesia~	22 February 2012	Formats: DVD, BD
DAICHI MIURA LIVE 2012 ~D.M.~ in BUDOKAN	22 August 2012	Formats: DVD, BD
DAICHI MIURA "exTime Tour 2012"	16 January 2013	Formats: DVD, BD
DAICHI MIURA "Choreo Chronicle 2008-2011 Plus"	20 March 2013	Formats: DVD, BD
DAICHI MIURA LIVE TOUR 2013 -Door to the unknown- in YOKOHAMA ARENA	29 January 2014	Formats: DVD, BD
DAICHI MIURA LIVE TOUR 2014 - THE ENTERTAINER	1 October 2014	Formats: DVD, BD
DAICHI MIURA "Choreo Chronicle 2012-2015 Plus"	16 December 2015	Formats: DVD, BD
DAICHI MIURA LIVE TOUR 2015"FEVER"	10 February 2016	Formats: DVD, BD
DAICHI MIURA LIVE TOUR 2016"(RE)PLAY"	22 March 2017	Formats: DVD, BD
DAICHI MIURA Live Chronicle 2005-2017	27 December 2018	Formats: DVD, BD
DAICHI MIURA BEST HIT TOUR in Japan Budokan	27 June 2018	Formats: DVD, BD
DAICHI MIURA LIVE TOUR ONE END in Osaka-Jo Hall	12 June 2019	Formats: DVD, BD
DAICHI MIURA LIVE COLORLESS / The Choice is	23 December 2020	Formats: DVD, BD
DAICHI MIURA ARENA LIVE 2024 + LIVE TOUR 2023「OVER」	28 August 2024	Formats: DVD, BD

=== Collaborative works ===
- ajapai "声をかさねて... feat.DAICHI MIURA" (Single, Album "unaffected", 2006)
- "Wishing on a groove" (Album, V.A. "CHRISTMAS HARMONY ~VISION FACTORY presents", 2007)
- "Special Story" (Album, V.A. "FLOWER FESTIVAL~VISION FACTORY presents", 2008)
- 千晴]"STOP!! feat. Daichi Miura" (Album, "バカ正直", 2009)
- "SUGAR SHACK feat. Full of Harmony, LL BROTHERS, 三浦大知, HI-D, LEO" (Album "SUGAR SHACK Official soundz mixed by DJ HAL ", 2009)
- "When She Loved Me [Toy Story 2]" (Album, V.A. "Mellow Disney ~R&B Revisited~", 2009)
- BoA "Possibility duet with Daichi Miura" (Album "IDENTITY", 2010)
- Sowelu "年下の君に duet with Daichi Miura" (Album "Love & I .~恋愛遍歴~", 2010)
- "Can't Help Falling in Love [Lilo & Stitch]" (Album, V.A. "Urban pop Disney", 2010)
- SUGAR SHACK "君がいるなら ~White Love Song~" (Single, 2010) *Digital Single
- lecca "First Sight feat.三浦大知" (Album "箱舟～ballads in me～", 2011)
- SUGAR SHACK ALL STARS "明日の太陽" (Single, 2011) *Digital Single
- "熱帯夜" (Album "SUGAR SHACK FACTORY ", 2011)
- Kreva "蜃気楼 feat. 三浦大知" (Album "GO", 2011)
- MAJOR MUSIC "HOPE" (Single, 2011 *a charity song, for "Aftermath of the 2011 Tōhoku earthquake and tsunami")
- 福原みほ(Miho Fukuhara) "Dream on feat. 三浦大知" (Single, Album "The Best of Soul Extreme", 2012)
- DJ Deckstream "HOLIDAY feat.三浦大知" (Album "DECKSTREAM.JP", 2013)
- Kreva "全速力 feat. 三浦大知" (Best Album "KX", 2014)
- 黒沢薫（Gospellers） "Supernova duet with 三浦大知" (Single, 2015)
- May J. "輝く未来 with 三浦大知" (Album "May J. sings Disney", 2015)
- "愛を感じて Can you feel the love tonight " (Album, V.A. "ドリーム～ディズニー・グレイテスト・ソングス～ 邦楽盤 DREAM -DISNEY GREATEST SONGS- HOUGAKUHEN ", 2015)
- "決戦は金曜日" (Album, V.A. "The best covers of DREAMS COME TRUE ドリウタ Vol.1", 2017)
- "星に願いを" (Album, V.A. "Thank You Disney", 2017)
- MIYAVI vs 三浦大知 "Dancing with My Fingers", (Album, MIYAVI "SAMURAI SESSIONS vol.2", 2017)
- 千晴 "NAMIDA feat. 三浦大知", (Album "始まり", 2018)
- 千晴 "始まり feat. 三浦大知", (Album "始まり", 2018)
- 絢香(Ayaka)&三浦大知 "ハートアップ" (Single, 2018)
- "すべりだい" (Album, V.A. 椎名林檎(Ringo Sheena) tribute "アダムとイヴの林檎", 2018)
- Soil & "Pimp" Sessions "comrade feat. 三浦大知" (Album, Soil & "Pimp" Sessions "DAPPER", 2018)
- レキシ(Rekishi) "GOEMON feat. ビッグ門左衛門" (Album, レキシ "ムキシ", 2018)
- MIYAVI vs KREVA vs 三浦大知 "Rain Dance" (Album, MIYAVI "Samurai Sessions, Vol. 3: Worlds Collid", 2018)
- 絢香(Ayaka)&三浦大知 "ねがいぼし" (Digital distribution only, 2020)
- Kreva "Fall in Love Again feat. 三浦大知" (Single, 2020)
- "キャンディ (原田真二)(Candy (Harada Shinji) " (Album, V.A. "松本隆 作詞活動50周年トリビュート 「風街に連れてって!」", 2021)
- Among Colorful - Ai, Motohiro Hata, Little Glee Monster, Daichi Miura, Perfume, Taemin (Shinee), Miyavi, Nasty C, Sabrina Carpenter, Ayumu Imazu, Blue Vintage, Mizki, Sanari and Chikuzen Sato (Sing Like Talking) "Colorful" (Digital distribution only, 2021)
- Ai "In the Middle" (Digital distribution only, 2021)
- "全開 feat. Kreva" (Album, "OVER", 2024)

== Awards ==
Year	Award	Category	Work/Nominee	Result	Ref.
2014	2014 MTV Video Music Awards Japan	Best R&B Video	"I'm on Fire"	Won	
2014	2014 MTV Europe Music Awards	Best Japanese Act	Daichi Miura	Won	
2015	2015 MTV Video Music Awards Japan	Best R&B Artist	Daichi Miura	Won	
2016	2016 MTV Video Music Awards Japan	Best R&B Video	"Cry & Fight"	Won	
2017	2017 MTV Video Music Awards Japan	Best R&B Video	"(Re)play"	Won	
2017	59th Japan Record Awards	Excellent Works	"Excite"	Won	
2017	50th Japan Cable Awards	Excellent Award	Daichi Miura	Won	
2018	2018 MTV Video Music Awards Japan	Artist of the Year	Daichi Miura	Won	
2018	60th Japan Record Awards	Excellent Works	"Be Myself"	Won	
2019	2019 MTV Video Music Awards Japan	Best Male Artist Video	"Katasumi"	Won	
2019	61st Japan Record Awards	Excellent Works	"Katasumi"	Won	
2020	62nd Japan Record Awards	Excellent Works	"I'm Here"	Won	
