= Naotaro Moriyama =

Japanese J-pop singer

- 森山 直太朗
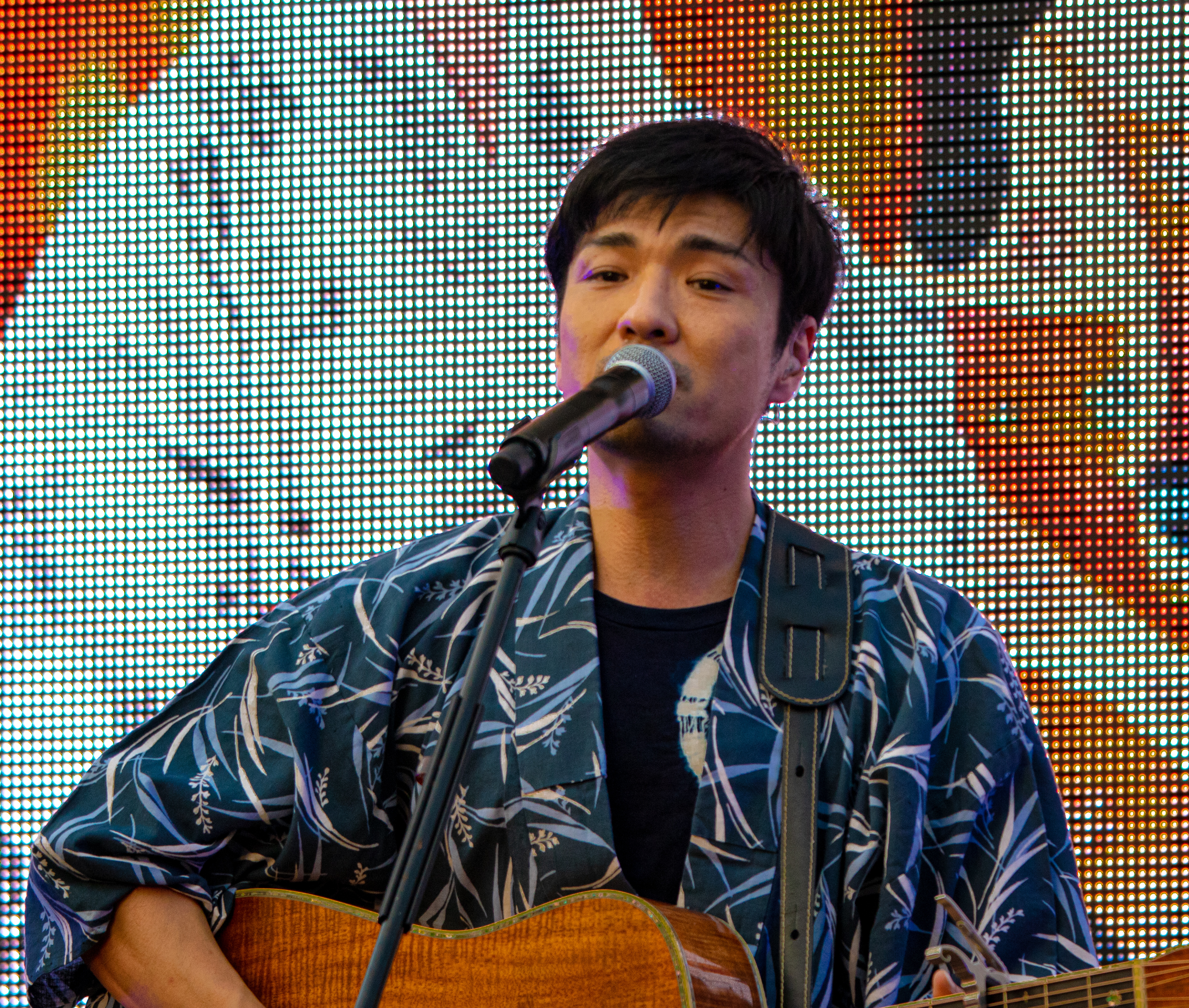
- Moriyama at Tenjin Matsuri 2018, in Fukuoka.
- Born: Naotarō Moriyama (森山 直太朗); April 23, 1976 (age 50); Shibuya, Tokyo, Japan
- Occupations: Singer-songwriter; record producer; actor
- Spouse: Mamiko Hirai (m. 2018)
- Parents: Ryōko Moriyama; James Taki
- Relatives: Hiroaki Ogi; Hiroshi Kamayatsu
- Musical career
- Genres: J-Pop; folk
- Instruments: Singing; guitar
- Years active: 2001–present
- Labels: Universal; EMI; Nayutawave
- Website: www.naotaro.com

Naotaro Moriyama (Japanese: 森山直太朗, Hepburn: Moriyama Naotarō; born April 23, 1976) is a Japanese singer-songwriter and actor. His mother is Ryōko Moriyama, a well-known folk singer.

Moriyama came out with the album "Kawaita Uta wa Sakana no Esa ni Chōdo Ii" in 2002, including the song "Sakura".

== Discography ==
=== Singles ===
- "Hoshikuzu no Serenade" (星屑のセレナーデ, Hoshikuzu no Serenāde; "Stardust Serenade") - November 27, 2002
- "Sakura" (さくら) - March 5, 2003
- "Natsu no Owari" (夏の終わり; "Summer's End") - August 20, 2003
- "Taiyō/Koe" (太陽/声; "The Sun/Voice") - January 10, 2004
- "Ikitoshi Ikeru Mono e" (生きとし生ける物へ; "To All Living Things") - March 17, 2004
- "Ima ga Jinsei ~Hishō-hen~" (今が人生～飛翔編～; "My Life Is Now ~Flight Chapter~") - August 4, 2004
- "Toki no Yukue ~Jo: Haru no Sora~" (時の行方～序・春の空～; "Time's Outcome ~Overture: A Spring Sky~") - February 23, 2005
- "Chiisana Koi no Yūmagure" (小さな恋の夕間暮れ; "A Little Love in the Twilight") - June 15, 2005
- "Kazahana" (風花; "A Snow Flurry in a Clear Sky") - November 16, 2005
- "Kimi wa Gobanme no Kisetsu" (君は五番目の季節; "You're the Fifth Season") -
- "Kaze ni Natte" (風になって; "Become the Wind") - September 13, 2006
- "Koishikute/Yume Mitai ~Dakara Kumo ni Akogarete~" (恋しくて/夢みたい～だから雲に憧れた～; "I Miss You/It's Like a Dream ~That's Why I Yearn for the Clouds~") - October 25, 2006
- "Mirai ~Kaze no Tsuyoi Gogo ni Umareta Sonnet~" (未来～風の強い午後に生まれたソネット～, Mirai ~Kaze no Tsuyoi Gogo ni Umareta Sonetto~; "Future ~A Sonnet That Arose On a Windy Afternoon~") - May 9, 2007
- "Taiyō no Nihohi" (太陽のにほひ; "Scent of the Sun") - August 8, 2007
- "Snowdrop" (スノウドロップ, Sunōdoroppu) - January 30, 2008
- "Ikiteru Koto ga Tsurai nara" (生きてることが辛いなら; "If Life Is Tough") - August 27, 2008
- "Namida" (涙; "Tears") - October 21, 2009
- "Kachōfūbetsu/Kotoba ni Sureba" (花鳥風月/言葉にすれば; "Beauties of Nature/If the Words") - September 29, 2010

=== Albums ===
- Kawaita Uta wa Sakana no Esa ni Chōdo Ii (乾いた唄は魚の餌にちょうどいい; Dry Songs Are Suitable For Feeding Fish) - October 2, 2002
- Ikutsumono Kawa o Koete Umareta Kotobatachi (いくつもの川を越えて生まれた言葉たち; Words Coming Across Numbers of Rivers) - June 18, 2003
- Aratanaru Kōshinryō o Motomete (新たなる香辛料を求めて; Looking for New Spices) - May 26, 2004
- Kazemachi Kōsaten (風待ち交差点; At an Intersection Waiting For the Wind) - November 29, 2006
- Shokun!! (諸君!!; Folks!!) - March 5, 2008
- Arayurumono no Mannaka de (あらゆるものの真ん中で; In the Middle of Everything) - June 9, 2010
- Suteki na Something (素敵なサムシング, Suteki na Samushingu; Something Wonderful) - April 11, 2012
- Toaru Monogatari (とある物語; A Certain Story) - April 24, 2013
- Jiyū no Genkai (自由の限界; The Limits of Liberty) - December 11, 2013

=== Compilation albums ===
- Kessakusen 2001 ~ 2005 (傑作撰 2001〜2005; Masterpieces From 2001 to 2005) - June 15, 2005
- Rare Tracks Vol.1 (レア・トラックス vol.1, Rea Torakkusu vol.1) - December 15, 2010
