= List of Produce 101 Japan Shinsekai contestants =

Contestants of 2026 reality TV show

Produce 101 Japan Shinsekai is the fourth season of the Japanese reality competition show Produce 101 Japan. 123 male trainees are competing to debut in a twelve-member boy band.

== Contestants ==
The spelling of the English names is in accordance with the official website. The names of the contestants are presented in Western order (given name, family name).

Color key

Final members of the debut group
Contestant was eliminated in the final episode
Contestant was eliminated at the third elimination round
Contestant was eliminated at the second elimination round
Contestant was eliminated at the first elimination round
Contestant was eliminated in the 101 Pass elimination round
Contestant left the show
Top 12
Saved with Global Ranker (Note: The Global Ranker was a separate ranking, allowing eliminated contestants to be saved from elimination if they ranked in the top 12.)

List of Produce 101 Japan Shinsekai contestants
Region	Audition Team Name	Name	Age (Note: As of Episode 1 (March 26, 2026), added new age if contestant is still in the show on their birthday.)	Judges' Evaluation		Ranking																	
Region	Audition Team Name	Name	Age	Judges' Evaluation		Ep. 2 (Note: As of April 2, 2026, at 21:00 JST.)	Ep. 3 (Note: As of April 9, 2026, at 21:00 JST.)	Episode 5 (Note: The 1st Voting Period revealed the rankings of the surviving contestants of the first round.)				Ep. 6 (Note: As of April 30, 2026, at 21:00 JST.)	Episode 8 (Note: The 2nd Voting Period revealed the rankings of the surviving contestants of the second round.)				Episode 10 (Note: The 3rd Voting Period revealed the rankings of the surviving contestants of the third round.)				Episode 11 (Note: The 4th Voting Period revealed the rankings of the surviving contestants of the final round.)		Final
Region	Audition Team Name	Name	Age	1	2	#	#	Votes		Points	#	#	Votes		Points	#	Votes		Points	#	Votes	#	Final
Region	Audition Team Name	Name	Age	1	2	#	#	National	Sekai	Points	#	#	National	Sekai	Points	#	National	Sekai	Points	#	Votes	#	Final
Aichi	RE:Shine	Kato Daiki (Note: Kato Daiki and Yoon Jae-yong were contestants on Make Mate 1.) (加藤 大樹)	21	B	A	3	2	1,296,479	488,603	1,785,492	1	1	1,146,156	517,550	1,674,104	1	157,868	67,410	225,289	10	537,456	1	1
Nara	WEST KIDS	Yada Yoshiki (Note: Yada Yoshiki was a contestant on Active Singer JAPAN.) (矢田 佳暉)	21	A	B	1	3	939,786	590,728	1,530,933	4	6	880,055	588,754	1,469,111	5	131,167	150,172	281,371	3	508,787	2	2
Gyeonggi	Tanabota (たなぼた)	Park Si-young (Note: Park Si-young is a former member of Mirae and was a contestant on Under Nineteen.) (パク・シヨン)	22	A	A	5	5	897,732	513,636	1,411,784	6	5	923,286	506,079	1,429,746	6	136,731	86,186	262,940	6	498,627	3	3
Mokpo	Tanabota (たなぼた)	Oh Shin-haeng (オ・シンヘン)	21	B	A	6	6	939,330	472,529	1,412,187	5	7	870,135	443,837	1,314,368	7	125,315	89,780	315,128	1	481,415	4	4
Kanagawa	Misters & Prince (ミスターズ＆プリンス)	Goto Yuki (後藤 結)	18	D	C	17	17	493,758	180,964	677,125	17	18	660,696	199,470	860,502	16	181,124	46,549	227,684	9	470,789	5	5
Gunma	Full Swing (フルスイング)	Yanagiya Issa (柳谷 伊冴)	20	C	C	48	37	554,421	93,744	651,675	19	9	897,550	175,217	1,073,109	11	191,035	38,565	229,608	8	417,479	6	6
Kochi	Raku (楽)	Ono Keito (小野 慶人)	25	D	C	13	15	577,221	193,555	771,187	16	17	638,558	169,107	807,915	18	126,472	45,080	171,563	15	408,598	7	7
Ibaraki	Pick-a-boo	Abe Yura (Note: Yoo Hyeon-seung, Asaka Kotaro, and Abe Yura are former members of PICKUS and were contestants on Fan Pick.) (Note: Aom Suungkavathin, Yoo Hyeon-seung, Asaka Kotaro, Abe Yura, and Obayashi Yusei were contestants on Project 7.) (安部 结蘭)	20	C	A	4	4	1,051,560	501,072	1,553,054	3	4	1,028,801	538,718	1,617,904	2	201,685	88,061	309,760	2	407,595	8	8
Gunma	FRESH-MEN	Iizuka Ryoga (飯塚 亮賀)	21	C	F	10	11	783,434	142,348	926,196	12	12	889,505	231,443	1,121,251	8	171,106	63,471	264,597	5	404,999	9	9
Saitama	Runway	Sugiyama Ryuji (杉山 竜司)	19	A	B	22	25	517,442	107,469	627,362	23	11	876,385	218,560	1,095,325	10	143,840	50,154	194,003	12	390,614	10	10
Chiba	FRESH-MEN	Terui Kosuke (照井 康祐)	18	C	A	9	8	981,058	209,766	1,194,391	7	2	1,240,023	340,771	1,591,213	3	207,714	67,912	275,646	4	381,605	11	11
Hyogo	Hi teens!	Hamada Towa (濱田 永遠)	18	B	B	16	16	515,483	268,686	784,543	15	13	599,161	392,724	1,002,279	14	136,405	46,296	182,709	14	378,536	12	12
Hsinchu	My Boyhood (我的少年時代)	Chen Rickey (Note: Chen Rickey and Katsuki Seita were contestants on Scool.) (Note: Chen Rickey and Fujimaki Taiga were contestants on Boys II Planet.) (チェン・リッキー)	19	C	D	38	28	480,239	116,014	596,495	25	14	869,006	114,547	1,033,947	13	220,740	27,768	248,522	7	Not Shown	13	13
Aichi	22×TEENS	Tsuchida Osuke (Note: Tsuchida Osuke was a contestant on Boys Planet.) (土田 央修)	22	A	A	14	14	714,427	166,755	883,587	13	10	776,690	292,015	1,069,057	12	138,751	46,381	185,153	13	Not Shown	14	14
Osaka	Keio Guys (慶應Guys)	Kumabe Takuto (隈部 拓斗)	21	D	D	12	9	904,298	147,917	1,055,661	9	15	714,472	152,387	867,204	15	156,572	38,698	195,293	11	Not Shown	15	15
Aichi	BUZZ UP!	Kurahashi Goten (倉橋 吾槙)	21	B	F	11	13	804,763	120,893	929,221	11	20	504,118	158,540	662,973	28	134,151	17,409	151,576	20	Not Shown	16	16
Seoul	Tanabota (たなぼた)	Yoo Hyeon-seung (ユ・ヒョンスン)	22	A	A	15	10	634,710	426,353	1,061,514	8	8	713,383	393,432	1,107,230	9	75,318	71,774	147,098	21	Not Shown	17	17
Saitama	FRESH-MEN	Okada Yuma (岡田 侑磨)	19	D	D	47	48	237,995	63,227	301,538	39	32	467,238	126,329	593,937	32	129,567	19,192	158,771	17	Not Shown	18	18
Honolulu	Atlantic Boys	Adam Nagai (アダム・ナガイ)	18	A	A	7	7	749,512	298,131	1,047,949	10	22	528,431	242,254	781,051	21	108,155	45,142	153,301	19	Not Shown	19	19
Miyazaki	REN REN REN (蓮蓮蓮)	Koshimizu Ren (小清水 蓮)	19	C	F	8	12	565,502	297,370	866,339	14	16	361,952	427,809	790,024	20	56,660	78,282	134,949	23	Not Shown	20	20
Hokkaido	Log IN!	Aonuma Koshiro (青沼 昂史朗)	20	F	D	31	27	384,186	203,900	588,448	26	19	439,858	366,617	806,831	19	71,328	91,572	162,917	16	Not Shown	21	21
Tokyo	Shishimai (獅子舞)	Kobayashi Chisato (小林 千悟)	21	B	B	23	23	342,390	232,804	578,670	27	26	247,892	376,913	675,133	26	35,536	120,540	156,082	18	Not Shown	22	22
Shizuoka	Raku (楽)	Tanaka Maki (田中 蒔)	21	D	F	25	29	454,479	73,019	531,106	30	30	454,276	93,291	547,856	34	Not Shown			22	Eliminated		23
Tokyo	Full Swing (フルスイング)	Imae Rikuto (今江 陸斗)	20	B	D	35	36	410,634	48,771	462,848	31	29	468,774	74,999	544,114	35	Not Shown			24	Eliminated		24
Ishikawa	Spicy Kyoudai (Spicy兄弟)	Yokoyama Kaname (横山 奏夢)	22	A	C	27	26	489,111	147,710	640,295	21	24	519,064	179,861	699,278	23	Not Shown			25	Eliminated		25
Osaka	Pick-a-boo	Asaka Kotaro (浅香 孝太郎)	22	D	D	26	24	485,986	188,343	674,618	18	21	589,934	166,196	816,533	17	Not Shown			26	Eliminated		26
Kanagawa	FRESH-MEN	Yamashita Shu (山下 柊)	19	C	C	28	31	251,103	156,737	410,550	34	34	493,081	232,878	726,364	22	Not Shown			27	Eliminated		27
Incheon	Tanabota (たなぼた)	Yoon Jae-yong (ユン・ジェヨン)	20	D	A	32	33	224,307	197,307	422,017	33	35	458,905	217,900	687,239	25	Not Shown			28	Eliminated		28
Kanagawa	Dream Again	Ishida Ryota (Note: Ishida Ryota is a former member of DAN⇄JYO.) (石田 亮太)	22	B	A	41	38	285,753	35,288	324,441	37	37	411,066	151,893	613,310	30	Not Shown			29	Eliminated		29
Seoul	Seoulmate (ソウルメイト)	Lee Hyun-jae (イ・ヒョンジェ)	17	F	C	21	21	491,405	152,334	644,057	20	25	537,611	144,126	692,125	24	Not Shown			30	Eliminated		30
Tokyo	Runway	Ogasawara Giuseppe Kei (小笠原 ジュゼッペ 慧)	20	A	B	18	20	413,742	149,834	563,977	28	27	463,370	167,013	630,774	29	Not Shown			31	Eliminated		31
Kyoto	BUZZ UP!	Obayashi Yusei (大林 悠成)	24	B	A	24	22	491,658	123,081	618,187	24	23	518,578	141,270	670,275	27	Not Shown			32	Eliminated		32
Shizuoka	Log IN!	Shinogaya Ayumu (Note: Shinogaya Ayumu was a contestant on Produce 101 Japan Season 2.) (篠ヶ谷 歩夢)	24	C	B	29	30	307,665	135,249	446,330	32	33	328,398	219,610	548,293	33	Not Shown			33	Eliminated		33
Aichi	Li-Hao	Liu Kaichi (リュウ・カイチ)	22	F	F	68	73	199,855	57,688	260,987	43	28	479,797	125,347	605,483	31	Not Shown			34	Eliminated		34
Fukui	Keio Guys (慶應Guys)	Kenmotsu Kinari (釼持 吉成)	23	F	A	2	1	1,372,025	392,007	1,764,377	2	3	1,045,520	484,313	1,540,221	4	Left the show						35
Los Angeles	Angels	Archer Uy (アーチャー・ウイ)	15	B	B	20	18	418,956	215,873	635,060	22	36	Not Shown			36	Eliminated						36
Aichi	RE:Shine	Matsuda Taiga (Note: Matsuda Taiga was a contestant on Timelesz Project.) (松田 太雅)	22	C	D	30	32	209,257	194,627	406,263	35	31	Not Shown			37	Eliminated						37
Amstelveen	Atlantic Boys	Itakura Yuta (板倉 悠太)	17	B	F	19	19	402,896	156,487	559,733	29	38	Not Shown			38	Eliminated						38
Gyeonggi	3 UNITED	Kwak Dong-min (カク・ドンミン)	21	D	B	33	35	259,411	113,469	376,311	37	39	Not Shown			39	Eliminated						39
Beijing	Li-Hao	Li Weize (リー・ウェイゼ)	22	B	D	53	54	133,326	120,464	257,224	44	42	Not Shown			40	Eliminated						40
Tokyo	EAST FIVE	Nishizaki Shu (西﨑 柊)	23	D	F	45	44	178,864	66,133	248,417	49	40	Not Shown			41	Eliminated						41
Tokyo	K-TRAINEES	Fujimaki Taiga (Note: Fujimaki Taiga was a contestant on Nizi Project Season 2.) (藤牧 大雅)	20	B	A	34	34	274,222	102,710	377,259	36	44	Not Shown			42	Eliminated						42
Tainan	My Boyhood (我的少年時代)	Chuang Jay (ジュアン・ジェイ)	19	C	B	50	45	146,040	103,620	249,896	47	41	Not Shown			43	Eliminated						43
Tokyo	Log IN!	Kaneyasu Junsei (金安 純正)	21	C	D	40	43	203,906	31,643	238,966	50	43	Not Shown			44	Eliminated						44
Kyoto	Dance Fighters (ダンスファイターズ)	Uno Kaimu (宇野 海夢)	22	C	D	42	42	215,997	30,000	248,719	48	48	Not Shown			45	Eliminated						45
Kumamoto	Kyuujoushou (九上昇)	Ohse Rinto (大瀬 凜和)	20	A	C	46	46	198,103	48,609	250,191	46	47	Not Shown			46	Eliminated						46
Shizuoka	RE:Shine	Sawai Sena (Note: Sawai Sena was a contestant on Chuang Asia: Season 2.) (澤井 星名)	20	D	D	36	40	235,534	56,097	291,936	40	46	Not Shown			47	Eliminated						47
Tokyo	Touzainanboku (東西南北)	Minamihira Tatsuya (南平 達矢)	21	C	C	43	47	210,577	60,123	271,044	41	45	Not Shown			48	Eliminated						48
Fukui	WEST KIDS	Takahashi Sora (髙橋 空良)	20	F	F	37	39	200,773	64,374	268,589	42	50	Not Shown			49	Eliminated						49
Miyagi	Misters & Prince (ミスターズ＆プリンス)	Mori Mei (森 明育)	20	F	F	39	41	211,739	40,894	252,911	45	49	Not Shown			50	Eliminated						50
Kanagawa	REN REN REN (蓮蓮蓮)	Horino Ren (堀野 蓮)	18	B	C	56	50	Not Shown			51	Eliminated											51
Osaka	Dance Fighters (ダンスファイターズ)	Maruo Jinichiro (丸尾 尋一郎)	18	C	D	62	61	Not Shown			52	Eliminated											52
Fukuoka	Hakata Binan (博多美男)	Hirashima Hikaru (平島 輝)	17	F	F	44	49	Not Shown			53	Eliminated											53
Manila	Arawan	Yohan Emmanuel (Note: Yohan Emmanuel was a contestant on Be The Next: 9 Dreamers.) (ヨハン・エマニュエル)	20	D	F	78	70	Not Shown			54	Eliminated											54
Aichi	Dream Again	Horio Hijiri (Note: Horio Hijiri is a former member of BERAVE and was a contestant on Starlight Boys.) (堀尾聖)	22	C	B	63	63	Not Shown			55	Eliminated											55
Osaka	22×TEENS	Honjo Akira (本荘 晃)	15	F	B	51	52	Not Shown			56	Eliminated											56
Kanagawa	K-TRAINEES	Kaneda Eito (Note: Kaneda Eito and Zukeran Hiroto were contestants on Universe League.) (金田 栄都)	21	D	D	52	53	Not Shown			57	Eliminated											57
Osaka	Runway	Okamoto Takuto (岡本 拓士)	22	F	F	49	51	Not Shown			58	Eliminated											58
Miyagi	Spicy Kyoudai (Spicy兄弟)	Takaya Kyohei (髙谷 京平)	20	C	F	86	86	Not Shown			59	Eliminated											59
Tokyo	Log IN!	Iwaki Shinji (岩城 慎二)	22	B	A	73	66	Not Shown			60	Eliminated											60
Nagano	22×TEENS	Sato Sora (Note: Sato Sora was a contestant on Class 0, Grade 0: Avu-chan's Classroom.) (佐藤 碧空)	22	D	C	77	82	Not Shown			61	Eliminated											61
Gunma	Mugendai (無限大)	Sakurai Fuma (櫻井 楓真)	20	D	C	59	59	Not Shown			62	Eliminated											62
Fukuoka	Hakata Binan (博多美男)	Miyazato Takuto (宮里 拓利)	20	C	C	80	95	Not Shown			63	Eliminated											63
Hiroshima	Mugendai (無限大)	Nakamaru Aju (中丸 晏寿)	18	D	B	54	57	Not Shown			64	Eliminated											64
Kyoto	Yumeshinsei (夢神聖)	Kamimoto Riku (神元 理丘)	22	A	A	97	71	Not Shown			65	Eliminated											65
Aichi	Runway	Ichikawa Daiki (市川 大輝)	21	F	D	66	62	Not Shown			66	Eliminated											66
Osaka	Career High	Nishida Soshi (Note: Nishida Soshi is a former member of PARTY PARTY.) (西田 颯梓)	19	F	F	64	65	Not Shown			67	Eliminated											67
Tokushima	WEST KIDS	Sano Yusei (佐野 由征)	21	B	C	60	55	Not Shown			68	Eliminated											68
Kumamoto	Kyuujoushou (九上昇)	Kurosaki Kanta (黒﨑 貫汰)	18	F	D	57	56	Not Shown			69	Eliminated											69
Tokyo	Misters & Prince (ミスターズ＆プリンス)	Takagi Haruto (髙城 暖人)	22	F	F	58	60	Not Shown			70	Eliminated											70
Kyoto	My Boyhood (我的少年時代)	Katsuki Seita (香月 誠太)	16	A	B	91	67	Not Shown			71	Eliminated											71
Hokkaido	22×TEENS	Mizugami Rui (水上 琉偉)	18	F	F	61	64	Not Shown			72	Eliminated											72
Chiba	FRESH-MEN	Masuda Tomoki (増田 倫希)	17	B	F	76	80	Not Shown			73	Eliminated											73
Lipa	3 UNITED	Aguinaldo Tristan James (アギナルド・トリスタン・ジェームス)	22	C	F	70	69	Not Shown			74	Eliminated											74
Aichi	Shishimai (獅子舞)	Kawai Kosei (河合 晃誠)	15	D	D	94	87	Not Shown			75	Eliminated											75
Okinawa	Kyuujoushou (九上昇)	Zukeran Hiroto (瑞慶覧 太都)	22	B	D	71	76	Not Shown			76	Eliminated											76
Hyogo	Dance Fighters (ダンスファイターズ)	Okada Hyugo (岡田 彪吾)	17	B	A	93	75	Not Shown			77	Eliminated											77
Fukuoka	Hakata Binan (博多美男)	Fujiyoshi Tokiya (藤芳 辰弥)	19	D	B	92	90	Not Shown			78	Eliminated											78
Melbourne	3 UNITED	Yamane Musashi (山根 武蔵)	20	D	D	65	68	Not Shown			79	Eliminated											79
Saitama	FRESH-MEN	Kobayashi Rento (小林 蓮翔)	18	F	F	55	58	Not Shown			80	Eliminated											80
Bangkok	Arawan	Aom Suungkavathin (Note: Aom Suungkavathin is a former member of XI.) (オム・スアンカワーテン)	22	D	C	67	72	Not Shown			81	Eliminated											81
Akita	Touzainanboku (東西南北)	Kitabayashi Tetora (北林 天虎)	22	D	D	89	94	Not Shown			82	Eliminated											82
Kanagawa	Touzainanboku (東西南北)	Tono Sota (東野 蒼汰)	17	C	B	82	85	Not Shown			83	Eliminated											83
Kanagawa	Raku (楽)	Matsuda Sogo (松田 颯吾)	20	F	C	85	81	Not Shown			84	Eliminated											84
Kanagawa	EAST FIVE	Tabi Kanade (多比 奏聖)	18	A	B	99	93	Not Shown			85	Eliminated											85
Gifu	Hi teens!	Miyazaki Shinsuke (宮崎 真佑)	18	B	D	72	77	Not Shown			86	Eliminated											86
Saitama	22×TEENS	Muramatsu Haruku (村松 遼空)	15	F	F	74	78	Not Shown			87	Eliminated											87
Kanagawa	EAST FIVE	Ko Keishin (黄 敬眞)	22	F	F	69	74	Not Shown			88	Eliminated											88
Okinawa	Mugendai (無限大)	Suekawa Eita (末川 瑛太)	18	C	C	83	79	Not Shown			89	Eliminated											89
Hokkaido	Pot-au-feu wa Ikaga Desu ka? (ポトフはいかがですか？)	Kanakura Takumi (金倉 拓未)	18	C	B	81	92	Not Shown			90	Eliminated											90
Saitama	Dance Fighters (ダンスファイターズ)	Okado Ryuga (岡戸 竜芽)	19	A	C	95	84	Not Shown			91	Eliminated											91
Tokyo	Touzainanboku (東西南北)	Nishiyama Kento (西山 賢人)	19	C	D	96	99	Not Shown			92	Eliminated											92
Toronto	Seoulmate (ソウルメイト)	Shin Jung-uk (シン・ジョンウク)	18	C	C	87	101	Not Shown			93	Eliminated											93
Saitma	Yumeshinsei (夢神聖)	Kojima Ayumu (児島 歩夢)	24	F	B	75	83	Not Shown			94	Eliminated											94
Aichi	Dream Again	Seki Keijiro (関 敬次郎)	16	C	B	98	98	Not Shown			94	Eliminated											94
Kanagawa	Dance Fighters (ダンスファイターズ)	Morii Teru (森井 輝)	22	A	C	100	89	Not Shown			96	Eliminated											96
Shiga	Hi teens!	Hatoba Rikuto (鳩場 陸人)	16	B	B	84	88	Not Shown			97	Eliminated											97
Tokyo	Shishimai (獅子舞)	Kai Rikuya (甲斐 陸也)	17	B	C	88	97	Not Shown			98	Eliminated											98
Tokyo	EAST FIVE	Kawabe Joe (河邊 晟)	18	D	D	101	91	Not Shown			99	Eliminated											99
Gifu	BUZZ UP!	Takamatsu Keisuke (髙松 敬祐)	21	C	F	90	96	Not Shown			100	Eliminated											100
Fukuoka	Hakata Binan (博多美男)	Ueno Rui (上野 琉偉)	19	C	C	79	100	Not Shown			101	Eliminated											101
Nagasaki	Kyuujoushou (九上昇)	Kawamura Hakuto (川村 珀斗)	18	Eliminated																			102-119
Hokkaido	Pot-au-feu wa Ikaga Desu ka? (ポトフはいかがですか？)	Sagawa Hirokazu (佐川 太一)	20	Eliminated																			102-119
Hokkaido	Pot-au-feu wa Ikaga Desu ka? (ポトフはいかがですか？)	Abe Itsuki (阿部 樹)	17	Eliminated																			102-119
Seoul	Seoulmate (ソウルメイト)	Lee Joong-hoon (イ・ジュンフン)	16	Eliminated																			102-119
Saitama	EAST FIVE	Ozawa Koshin (小澤 昂心)	21	Eliminated																			102-119
Osaka	BUZZ UP!	Kobayashi Kou (小林 廣)	19	Eliminated																			102-119
Los Angeles	Angels	Michael Minh Mccaffrey (マイケル ミン・マカフリ)	19	Eliminated																			102-119
Los Angeles	Angels	Patrick Phan Le (パトリック ファン・レ)	20	Eliminated																			102-119
Gunma	REN REN REN (蓮蓮蓮)	Kasahara Ren (笠原 蓮)	21	Eliminated																			102-119
Tokyo	Log IN!	Eguchi Rento (江口 蓮翔)	19	Eliminated																			102-119
Kumamoto	Career High	Ochiai Rio (落合 利温)	21	Eliminated																			102-119
Tokyo	Shishimai (獅子舞)	Koyauchi Ruka (小谷内 瑠嘉)	20	Eliminated																			102-119
Hyogo	WEST KIDS	Saito Sei (齊藤 惺)	21	Eliminated																			102-119
Osaka	Career High	Fujimoto Shinsei (藤本 真成)	22	Eliminated																			102-119
Fukui	Career High	Iida Shuma (飯田 柊馬)	23	Eliminated																			102-119
Hokkaido	Pot-au-feu wa Ikaga Desu ka? (ポトフはいかがですか？)	Osawa Yugo (大澤 佑冴)	20	Eliminated																			102-119
Hyogo	Yumeshinsei (夢神聖)	Fujii Yusei (藤井 雄聖)	21	Eliminated																			102-119
Hokkaido	Pot-au-feu wa Ikaga Desu ka? (ポトフはいかがですか？)	Okamoto Yuto (岡本 佑斗)	18	Eliminated																			102-119
Osaka	Mugendai (無限大)	Hori Eito (保里 瑛都)	19	C	Left the show (Note: Hori Eito and Sakurai Hikaru left the show at the same time, but due to their statuses as permanent and trainee candidate respectively, they are assigned different rankings.)																		120
Miyagi	Mugendai (無限大)	Sakurai Hikaru (櫻井 輝)	20	Left the show																			121

=== Prior to Produce 101 Japan Shinsekai ===
Prior to Produce 101 Japan Shinsekai

== Level Placement Test ==
The Level Placement Test (Japanese: レベル分けテスト, Hepburn: Reberu Wake Tesuto) involves the contestants performing in teams and getting their individual performance evaluated by the trainers. As opposed to previous seasons, contestants were subjected to early elimination depending on their evaluations. Contestants who were placed in D-class or higher would automatically advance, while those who did not place in any class were demoted to "trainee candidates" and could only rejoin the competition in F-class if they survived the "101 Pass" elimination round.

List of Level Placement Test performances
Performance			Team	Contestant	Class
#	Original artist(s)	Song	Team	Contestant	Class
Episode 1
1	TWS	"Hajimemashite" (はじめまして)	FRESH-MEN	Terui Kosuke	C
1	TWS	"Hajimemashite" (はじめまして)	FRESH-MEN	Kobayashi Rento	Trainee
1	TWS	"Hajimemashite" (はじめまして)	FRESH-MEN	Iizuka Ryoga	C
1	TWS	"Hajimemashite" (はじめまして)	FRESH-MEN	Yamashita Shu	C
1	TWS	"Hajimemashite" (はじめまして)	FRESH-MEN	Masuda Tomoki	B
1	TWS	"Hajimemashite" (はじめまして)	FRESH-MEN	Okada Yuma	D
2	INI	"Rocketeer"	Log IN!	Shinogaya Ayumu	C
2	INI	"Rocketeer"	Log IN!	Kaneyasu Junsei	C
2	INI	"Rocketeer"	Log IN!	Aonuma Koshiro	Trainee
2	INI	"Rocketeer"	Log IN!	Eguchi Rento	Trainee
2	INI	"Rocketeer"	Log IN!	Iwaki Shinji	B
3	INI	"More"	Shishimai (獅子舞)	Kobayashi Chisato	B
3	INI	"More"	Shishimai (獅子舞)	Kawai Kosei	D
3	INI	"More"	Shishimai (獅子舞)	Kai Rikuya	B
3	INI	"More"	Shishimai (獅子舞)	Koyauchi Ruka	Trainee
4	Pentagon	"Shine"	RE:Shine	Kato Daiki	B
4	Pentagon	"Shine"	RE:Shine	Sawai Sena	D
4	Pentagon	"Shine"	RE:Shine	Matsuda Taiga	C
5	BoyNextDoor	"If I Say, I Love You" (今日だけ I LOVE YOU)	Hakata Binan (博多美男)	Hirashima Hikaru	Trainee
5	BoyNextDoor	"If I Say, I Love You" (今日だけ I LOVE YOU)	Hakata Binan (博多美男)	Ueno Rui	C
5	BoyNextDoor	"If I Say, I Love You" (今日だけ I LOVE YOU)	Hakata Binan (博多美男)	Miyazato Takuto	C
5	BoyNextDoor	"If I Say, I Love You" (今日だけ I LOVE YOU)	Hakata Binan (博多美男)	Fujiyoshi Tokiya	D
6	TVXQ	"Share The World"	Touzainanboku (東西南北)	Nishiyama Kento	C
6	TVXQ	"Share The World"	Touzainanboku (東西南北)	Tono Sota	C
6	TVXQ	"Share The World"	Touzainanboku (東西南北)	Minamihira Tatsuya	C
6	TVXQ	"Share The World"	Touzainanboku (東西南北)	Kitabayashi Tetora	D
7	Official Hige Dandism	"Cry Baby"	Dream Again	Kato Daiki	B
7	Official Hige Dandism	"Cry Baby"	Dream Again	Tono Sota	C
7	Official Hige Dandism	"Cry Baby"	Dream Again	Minamihira Tatsuya	C
8	Dean Fujioka	"Be Alive"	Pot-au-feu wa Ikaga Desu ka? (ポトフはいかがですか？)	Sagawa Hirokazu	Trainee
8	Dean Fujioka	"Be Alive"	Pot-au-feu wa Ikaga Desu ka? (ポトフはいかがですか？)	Abe Itsuki	Trainee
8	Dean Fujioka	"Be Alive"	Pot-au-feu wa Ikaga Desu ka? (ポトフはいかがですか？)	Kanakura Takumi	C
8	Dean Fujioka	"Be Alive"	Pot-au-feu wa Ikaga Desu ka? (ポトフはいかがですか？)	Osawa Yugo	Trainee
8	Dean Fujioka	"Be Alive"	Pot-au-feu wa Ikaga Desu ka? (ポトフはいかがですか？)	Okamoto Yuto	Trainee
9	JO1	"SuperCali"	REN REN REN (蓮蓮蓮)	Horino Ren	B
9	JO1	"SuperCali"	REN REN REN (蓮蓮蓮)	Kasahara Ren	Trainee
9	JO1	"SuperCali"	REN REN REN (蓮蓮蓮)	Koshimizu Ren	C
10	Psychic Fever from Exile Tribe	"Paradise"	Li-Hao	Liu Kaichi	Trainee
10	Psychic Fever from Exile Tribe	"Paradise"	Li-Hao	Li Weize	B
11	One Ok Rock	"Stand Out Fit In"	Atlantic Boys	Adam Nagai	A
11	One Ok Rock	"Stand Out Fit In"	Atlantic Boys	Itakura Yuta	B
12	Da-ice	"I Wonder"	Yumeshinsei (夢神聖)	Kojima Ayumu	Trainee
12	Da-ice	"I Wonder"	Yumeshinsei (夢神聖)	Kamimoto Riku	A
12	Da-ice	"I Wonder"	Yumeshinsei (夢神聖)	Fujii Yusei	Trainee
13	Takahiro Nishijima	"Toriko" (トリコ)	EAST FIVE	Kawabe Joe	D
13	Takahiro Nishijima	"Toriko" (トリコ)	EAST FIVE	Tabi Kanade	A
13	Takahiro Nishijima	"Toriko" (トリコ)	EAST FIVE	Ko Keishin	Trainee
13	Takahiro Nishijima	"Toriko" (トリコ)	EAST FIVE	Ozawa Koshin	Trainee
13	Takahiro Nishijima	"Toriko" (トリコ)	EAST FIVE	Nishizaki Shu	D
14	JO1	"RadioVision"	Mugendai (無限大)	Nakamura Aju	D
14	JO1	"RadioVision"	Mugendai (無限大)	Suekawa Eita	B
14	JO1	"RadioVision"	Mugendai (無限大)	Hori Eito	C
14	JO1	"RadioVision"	Mugendai (無限大)	Sakurai Fuma	D
14	JO1	"RadioVision"	Mugendai (無限大)	Sakurai Hikaru	Trainee
15	Orange Range	"Ikenai Taiyou" (イケナイ太陽)	Kyuujoushou (東西南北)	Kawamura Hakuto	Trainee
15	Orange Range	"Ikenai Taiyou" (イケナイ太陽)	Kyuujoushou (東西南北)	Zukeran Hiroto	B
15	Orange Range	"Ikenai Taiyou" (イケナイ太陽)	Kyuujoushou (東西南北)	Kurosaki Kanta	Trainee
15	Orange Range	"Ikenai Taiyou" (イケナイ太陽)	Kyuujoushou (東西南北)	Ohse Rinto	A
16	Fujii Kaze	"Kirari" (きらり)	Seoulmate (ソウルメイト)	Lee Hyun-jae	Trainee
16	Fujii Kaze	"Kirari" (きらり)	Seoulmate (ソウルメイト)	Lee Joong-hoon	Trainee
16	Fujii Kaze	"Kirari" (きらり)	Seoulmate (ソウルメイト)	Shin Jung-uk	C
17	10-Feet	"Dai Zero Kan" (第ゼロ感)	BUZZ UP!	Kurahashi Goten	B
17	10-Feet	"Dai Zero Kan" (第ゼロ感)	BUZZ UP!	Takamatsu Keisuke	C
17	10-Feet	"Dai Zero Kan" (第ゼロ感)	BUZZ UP!	Kobayashi Kou	Trainee
17	10-Feet	"Dai Zero Kan" (第ゼロ感)	BUZZ UP!	Obayashi Yusei	B
18	Ayumu Imazu	"Howl"	Keio Guys (慶應Guys)	Kenmotsu Kinari	Trainee
18	Ayumu Imazu	"Howl"	Keio Guys (慶應Guys)	Kumabe Takuto	D
19	XG	"Woke Up"	Arawan	Aom Suungkavathin	D
19	XG	"Woke Up"	Arawan	Yohan Emmanuel	D
20	XG	"Woke Up"	Runway	Ichikawa Daiki	Trainee
20	XG	"Woke Up"	Runway	Ogasawara Giuseppe Kei	A
20	XG	"Woke Up"	Runway	Sugiyama Ryuji	A
20	XG	"Woke Up"	Runway	Okamoto Takuto	Trainee
21	NCT Wish	"Wish"	WEST KIDS	Saito Sei	Trainee
21	NCT Wish	"Wish"	WEST KIDS	Takahashi Sora	Trainee
21	NCT Wish	"Wish"	WEST KIDS	Yada Yoshiki	A
21	NCT Wish	"Wish"	WEST KIDS	Sano Yusei	B
22	DXTeen	"Ryoukataomoi" (両片想い)	Angels	Archer Uy	B
22	DXTeen	"Ryoukataomoi" (両片想い)	Angels	Michael Minh Mccaffrey	Trainee
22	DXTeen	"Ryoukataomoi" (両片想い)	Angels	Patrick Phan Le	Trainee
23	Koji Wada	"Butter-Fly"	22xTEENS	Honjo Akira	Trainee
23	Koji Wada	"Butter-Fly"	22xTEENS	Muramatsu Haruku	Trainee
23	Koji Wada	"Butter-Fly"	22xTEENS	Tsuchida Osuke	A
23	Koji Wada	"Butter-Fly"	22xTEENS	Mizugami Rui	Trainee
23	Koji Wada	"Butter-Fly"	22xTEENS	Sato Sora	D
24	M!lk	"Ii Jan" (イイじゃん)	Misters & Prince (ミスターズ＆プリンス)	Takagi Haruto	Trainee
24	M!lk	"Ii Jan" (イイじゃん)	Misters & Prince (ミスターズ＆プリンス)	Mori Mei	Trainee
24	M!lk	"Ii Jan" (イイじゃん)	Misters & Prince (ミスターズ＆プリンス)	Goto Yuki	D
25	Kenshi Yonezu	"Kanden" (感電)	Career High	Ochiai Rio	Trainee
25	Kenshi Yonezu	"Kanden" (感電)	Career High	Fujimoto Shinsei	Trainee
25	Kenshi Yonezu	"Kanden" (感電)	Career High	Iida Shuma	Trainee
25	Kenshi Yonezu	"Kanden" (感電)	Career High	Nishida Soshi	Trainee
26	One N' Only	"Gooey"	Hi teens!	Hatoba Rikuto	B
26	One N' Only	"Gooey"	Hi teens!	Miyazaki Shinsuke	B
26	One N' Only	"Gooey"	Hi teens!	Hamada Towa	B
27	Tomorrow X Together	"Can't Stop"	Tanabota (たなぼた)	Yoo Hyeon-seung	A
27	Tomorrow X Together	"Can't Stop"	Tanabota (たなぼた)	Yoon Jae-yong	D
27	Tomorrow X Together	"Can't Stop"	Tanabota (たなぼた)	Oh Shin-haeng	B
27	Tomorrow X Together	"Can't Stop"	Tanabota (たなぼた)	Park Si-young	A
Episode 2
28	Produce 101 Japan season 2	"Goosebumps"	Dance Fighters (ダンスファイターズ)	Okada Hyugo	B
28	Produce 101 Japan season 2	"Goosebumps"	Dance Fighters (ダンスファイターズ)	Maruo Jinichiro	C
28	Produce 101 Japan season 2	"Goosebumps"	Dance Fighters (ダンスファイターズ)	Uno Kaimu	C
28	Produce 101 Japan season 2	"Goosebumps"	Dance Fighters (ダンスファイターズ)	Okado Ryuga	A
28	Produce 101 Japan season 2	"Goosebumps"	Dance Fighters (ダンスファイターズ)	Morii Teru	A
29	Creepy Nuts	"Bling-Bang-Bang-Born"	Spicy Kyoudai (Spicy兄弟)	Yokoyama Kaname	A
29	Creepy Nuts	"Bling-Bang-Bang-Born"	Spicy Kyoudai (Spicy兄弟)	Takaya Kyohei	C
30	Seventeen	"Home;Run"	Full Swing (フルスイング)	Yanagiya Issa	C
30	Seventeen	"Home;Run"	Full Swing (フルスイング)	Imae Rikuto	B
31	Vaundy	"Odoriko" (踊り子)	Raku (楽)	Ono Keito	D
31	Vaundy	"Odoriko" (踊り子)	Raku (楽)	Tanaka Maki	D
31	Vaundy	"Odoriko" (踊り子)	Raku (楽)	Matsuda Sogo	Trainee
32	One or Eight	"Don't Tell Nobody"	My Boyhood (我的少年時代)	Chuang Jay	C
32	One or Eight	"Don't Tell Nobody"	My Boyhood (我的少年時代)	Chen Rickey	C
32	One or Eight	"Don't Tell Nobody"	My Boyhood (我的少年時代)	Katsuki Seita	A
33	&Team	"Back to Life"	K-TRAINEES	Kaneda Eito	D
33	&Team	"Back to Life"	K-TRAINEES	Fujimaki Taiga	B
34	King Gnu	"Specialz"	Pick-a-boo	Asaka Kotaro	D
34	King Gnu	"Specialz"	Pick-a-boo	Abe Yura	C
Not Shown
35	Def Tech	"My Way"	3 UNITED	Kwak Dongmin	D
35	Def Tech	"My Way"	3 UNITED	Yamane Musashi	D
35	Def Tech	"My Way"	3 UNITED	Aguinaldo Tristan James	C

=== 101 Pass Elimination Round ===
Exclusively for the trainee candidates. Shortly after the Level Placement Test, a pre-show vote titled the "101 Pass" was held from February 2, 2026 to February 4, 2026, allowing the National producers and Sekai producers to vote among the trainee candidates that will join the show. Producers could vote up to 11 candidates per day, with the most-voted candidates being promoted to F-class and the remaining candidates being eliminated. Introduction videos and 1-minute PR videos were also uploaded to the official PRODUCE 101 JAPAN YouTube channel to introduce the candidates to the producers.

On March 24, 2026, 19 trainee candidates were revealed to have passed the elimination round, solidifying the 101-contestant lineup.

- Honjo Akira
- Kojima Ayumu
- Ichikawa Daiki
- Muramatsu Haruku
- Takagi Haruto
- Hirashima Hikaru
- Lee Hyun-jae
- Liu Kaichi
- Kurosaki Kanta
- Ko Keishin
- Kenmotsu Kinari
- Aonuma Koshiro
- Mori Mei
- Kobayashi Rento
- Mizugami Rui
- Matsuda Sogo
- Takahashi Sora
- Nishida Soshi
- Okamoto Takuto

== Re-evaluation Test ==
The Re-evaluation Test had the contestants learning and performing the show's theme, "Shinsekai", giving them a chance to be promoted to a higher class. Contestants are grouped together by class and learn the choreography and lyrics to the theme song under the trainers' instruction. Contestants also practice within an allotted time limit until the day of the re-evaluation, where they would record themselves one-by-one to be reassessed by the trainers. After all classes were re-organized based on the re-evaluations, the contestants voted to determine the A-class center candidates; the top five were Kato Daiki, Park Siyoung, Abe Yura, Kenmotsu Kinari, and Tsuchida Osuke. Each candidate perform "Shinsekai" in front of all of the contestants, and Abe Yura was selected to be the show's center. In addition, the trainers chose two candidates from A-class and B-class to perform the theme's rap lines; the A-class candidates were Terui Kosuke and Fujimaki Taiga, while the B-class candidates were Kwak Dong-min and Hamada Towa. Terui Kosuke was selected to perform the A-class rap while Kwak Dong-min was selected to perform the B-class rap.

Key

Same position	Class maintained
▲	Class upgraded
▼	Class downgraded

The top row indicates the initial level assigned after the Level Placement Test, while the first column indicates the new level after the re-evaluation. Bold denotes the show's center, while italics denotes the rappers.

Re-evaluation Test (2nd evaluation results)
Before After	A class	B class	C class	D class	F class
A class	Adam Nagai; Yoo Hyeon-seung; Tsuchida Osuke; Kamimoto Riku; Park Si-young	Kato Daiki ▲; Okada Hyugo ▲; Ishida Ryota ▲; Oh Shin-haeng ▲; Iwaki Shinji ▲; Fujimaki Taiga ▲; Obayashi Yusei ▲	Terui Kosuke ▲; **Abe Yura** ▲	Yoon Jae-yong ▲	Kenmotsu Kinari ▲
B class	Ogasawara Giuseppe Kei ▼; Tabi Kanade ▼; Sugiyama Ryuji ▼; Katsuki Seita ▼; Yada Yoshiki ▼	Archer Uy; Kobayashi Chisato; Hatoba Rikuto; Hamada Towa	Shinogaya Ayumu ▲; Horio Hijiri ▲; Chuang Jay ▲; Seki Keijiro ▲; Tono Sota ▲; Kanakura Takumi ▲	Nakamura Aju ▲; Kwak Dong-min ▲; Fujiyoshi Tokiya ▲	Honjo Akira ▲; Kojima Ayumu ▲
C class	Yokoyama Kaname ▼; Ohse Rinto ▼; Okado Ryuga ▼; Morii Teru ▼	Horino Ren ▼; Kai Rikuya ▼; Sano Yusei ▼	Suekawa Eita; Yanagiya Issa; Shin Jung-uk; Ueno Rui; Yamashita Shu; Miyazato Takuto; Minamihira Tatsuya	Aom Suungkavathin ▲; Sakurai Fuma ▲; Ono Keito ▲; Sato Sora ▲; Goto Yuki ▲	Lee Hyun-jae ▲; Matsuda Sogo ▲
D class	—N/a	Zukeran Hiroto ▼; Imae Rikuto ▼; Miyazaki Shinsuke ▼; Li Weize ▼	Maruo Jinichiro ▼; Kaneyasu Junsei ▼; Uno Kaimu ▼; Nishiyama Kento ▼; Chen Rickey ▼; Matsuda Taiga ▼	Kaneda Eito; Kawabe Joe; Kawai Kosei; Asaka Kotaro; Yamane Musashi; Sawai Sena; Kumabe Takuto; Kitabayashi Tetora; Okada Yuma	Ichikawa Daiki ▲; Kurosaki Kanta ▲; Aonuma Koshiro ▲
F class	—N/a	Kurahashi Goten ▼; Masuda Tomoki ▼; Itakura Yuta ▼	Takamatsu Keisuke ▼; Takaya Kyohei ▼; Koshimizu Ren ▼; Iizuka Ryoga ▼; Aguinaldo Tristan James ▼	Tanaka Maki ▼; Nishizaki Shu ▼; Yohan Emmanuel ▼	Muramatsu Haruku; Takagi Haruto; Hirashima Hikaru; Liu Kaichi; Ko Keishin; Mori Mei; Kobayashi Rento; Mizugami Rui; Takahashi Sora; Nishida Soshi; Okamoto Takuto

== Group Battle (Episode 3-4) ==
This match will have teams of contestants competing against each other in the same songs. The songs presented are as follows: "Loud" by INI, "Iris Out" by Kenshi Yonezu, "Bite Me" by ENHYPEN, "Show" by Ado, "Energetic" by Wanna One, "Love Seeker" by JO1, "The Peak" by Sekai no Owari, and "Case 143" by Stray Kids. As opposed to previous seasons, the team and song selections are done at the same time. All contestants had one minute to line up at the song they wanted to perform, except for Abe Yura, who was the center for the show's theme song, "Shinsekai". Abe picked his team members and song first, consisting of Park Si-young, Kato Daiki, Yoon Jae-yong, Yada Yoshiki, and Ogasawara Giuseppe Kei, with the song being "Energetic". For the remaining songs, a lottery was drawn to determine who could pick their team members and be the team's leader. Contestants who were not selected by the team leaders were relegated to the "No Team Zone" to form teams among themselves after each song's first team was determined. The audience voting for the performances is split into two different point tallies, the individual score, which pits the contestants against each other for audience votes, and the "Free Part" score, which occurs in real-time and is based on the overall quality of an assigned section of the song. For the winning team of each song, all the members would gain 2,000 benefit points. As an additional benefit, if the winning team also won the "Free Part", their "Free Part" vote would be quadrupled. After the performances, only 50 contestants would be able to move onto the next round. The remaining 51 contestants would be eliminated from the show.

Color key

- Winner
- Leader
- Center
- Leader and Center

Group Battle
Performance			Team			Contestant					
#	Artist	Song	#	Total (Note: The team's total is calculated by adding all of the team members' individual votes with the team's "Free Part" vote.)	Free Part	Position	Name	Votes	Total (Note: The contestant's total is calculated by adding their individual vote with their team's "Free Part" vote.)	Total with benefits	Rank
1	Kenshi Yonezu	"Iris Out"	1 CREEPY DEVILS	549	374	Vocal 1	Iwaki Shinji	59	433	—N/a	53
1	Kenshi Yonezu	"Iris Out"	1 CREEPY DEVILS	549	374	Vocal 2	Fujiyoshi Tokiya	17	391	—N/a	62
1	Kenshi Yonezu	"Iris Out"	1 CREEPY DEVILS	549	374	Vocal 3	Aguinaldo Tristan James	7	381	—N/a	65
1	Kenshi Yonezu	"Iris Out"	1 CREEPY DEVILS	549	374	Rapper 1	Kaneda Eito	9	383	—N/a	63
1	Kenshi Yonezu	"Iris Out"	1 CREEPY DEVILS	549	374	Rapper 2	Matsuda Sogo	6	380	—N/a	66
1	Kenshi Yonezu	"Iris Out"	1 CREEPY DEVILS	549	374	Rapper 3	Yoo Hyeon-seung	77	451	—N/a	52
1	Kenshi Yonezu	"Iris Out"	2 喜怒I6 (KidoI6)	611	381	Vocal 1	Sato Sora	14	395	3,538	7
1	Kenshi Yonezu	"Iris Out"	2 喜怒I6 (KidoI6)	611	381	Vocal 2	Tanaka Maki	84	465	3,608	1
1	Kenshi Yonezu	"Iris Out"	2 喜怒I6 (KidoI6)	611	381	Vocal 3	Maruo Jinichiro	31	412	3,555	5
1	Kenshi Yonezu	"Iris Out"	2 喜怒I6 (KidoI6)	611	381	Rapper 1	Kurahashi Goten	41	422	3,565	3
1	Kenshi Yonezu	"Iris Out"	2 喜怒I6 (KidoI6)	611	381	Rapper 2	Takaya Kyohei	35	416	3,559	4
1	Kenshi Yonezu	"Iris Out"	2 喜怒I6 (KidoI6)	611	381	Rapper 3	Nakamura Aju	25	406	3,549	6
2	JO1	"Love Seeker"	1 Heart Shakers	595	358	Vocal 1	Tabi Kanade	15	373	3,447	16
2	JO1	"Love Seeker"	1 Heart Shakers	595	358	Vocal 2	Ohse Rinto	47	405	3,479	9
2	JO1	"Love Seeker"	1 Heart Shakers	595	358	Vocal 3	Liu Kaichi	12	370	3,444	19
2	JO1	"Love Seeker"	1 Heart Shakers	595	358	Rapper 1	Terui Kosuke	134	492	3,566	2
2	JO1	"Love Seeker"	1 Heart Shakers	595	358	Rapper 2	Kawabe Joe	19	377	3,451	15
2	JO1	"Love Seeker"	1 Heart Shakers	595	358	Rapper 3	Takahashi Sora	10	368	3,442	20
2	JO1	"Love Seeker"	2 Love catchers	436	266	Vocal 1	Minamihira Tatsuya	77	343	—N/a	74
2	JO1	"Love Seeker"	2 Love catchers	436	266	Vocal 2	Asaka Kotaro	22	288	—N/a	92
2	JO1	"Love Seeker"	2 Love catchers	436	266	Vocal 3	Sawai Sena	38	304	—N/a	86
2	JO1	"Love Seeker"	2 Love catchers	436	266	Rapper 1	Takagi Haruto	14	280	—N/a	93
2	JO1	"Love Seeker"	2 Love catchers	436	266	Rapper 2	Kitabayashi Tetora	7	273	—N/a	95
2	JO1	"Love Seeker"	2 Love catchers	436	266	Rapper 3	Mori Mei	12	278	—N/a	94
3	Ado	"Show"	1 GLOBOYS	280	222	Vocal 1	Archer Uy	8	230	—N/a	99
3	Ado	"Show"	1 GLOBOYS	280	222	Vocal 2	Chuang Jay	14	236	—N/a	97
3	Ado	"Show"	1 GLOBOYS	280	222	Vocal 3	Yohan Emmanuel	2	224	—N/a	100
3	Ado	"Show"	1 GLOBOYS	280	222	Rapper 1	Chen Rickey	19	241	—N/a	96
3	Ado	"Show"	1 GLOBOYS	280	222	Rapper 2	Zukeran Hiroto	13	235	—N/a	98
3	Ado	"Show"	1 GLOBOYS	280	222	Rapper 3	Shin Jung-uk	2	224	—N/a	100
3	Ado	"Show"	2 Full Counter!!	681	348	Vocal 1	Miyazato Takuto	72	420	3,464	13
3	Ado	"Show"	2 Full Counter!!	681	348	Vocal 2	Aom Suungkavathin	7	355	3,399	33
3	Ado	"Show"	2 Full Counter!!	681	348	Vocal 3	Nishida Soshi	49	397	3,441	22
3	Ado	"Show"	2 Full Counter!!	681	348	Rapper 1	Honjo Akira	66	414	3,458	14
3	Ado	"Show"	2 Full Counter!!	681	348	Rapper 2	Yokoyama Kaname	81	429	3,473	11
3	Ado	"Show"	2 Full Counter!!	681	348	Rapper 3	Nishiyama Kento	33	381	3,425	25
3	Ado	"Show"	2 Full Counter!!	681	348	Rapper 4	Mizugami Rui	25	373	3,417	28
4	Enhypen	"Bite Me"	1 Kiss Me	417	305	Vocal 1	Oh Shin-haeng	22	327	—N/a	78
4	Enhypen	"Bite Me"	1 Kiss Me	417	305	Vocal 2	Kamimoto Riku	6	311	—N/a	82
4	Enhypen	"Bite Me"	1 Kiss Me	417	305	Vocal 3	Fujimaki Taiga	21	326	—N/a	79
4	Enhypen	"Bite Me"	1 Kiss Me	417	305	Vocal 4	Adam Nagai	1	306	—N/a	84
4	Enhypen	"Bite Me"	1 Kiss Me	417	305	Vocal 5	Lee Hyun-jae	12	317	—N/a	80
4	Enhypen	"Bite Me"	1 Kiss Me	417	305	Vocal 6	Kenmotsu Kinari	40	345	—N/a	72
4	Enhypen	"Bite Me"	1 Kiss Me	417	305	Vocal 7	Okada Yuma	10	315	—N/a	81
4	Enhypen	"Bite Me"	2 紅色Bites (Rainbow Bites)	630	352	Vocal 1	Yanagiya Issa	102	454	3,510	8
4	Enhypen	"Bite Me"	2 紅色Bites (Rainbow Bites)	630	352	Vocal 2	Kaneyasu Junsei	9	361	3,417	28
4	Enhypen	"Bite Me"	2 紅色Bites (Rainbow Bites)	630	352	Vocal 3	Li Weize	26	378	3,434	23
4	Enhypen	"Bite Me"	2 紅色Bites (Rainbow Bites)	630	352	Vocal 4	Kawai Kosei	11	363	3,419	26
4	Enhypen	"Bite Me"	2 紅色Bites (Rainbow Bites)	630	352	Vocal 5	Kumabe Takuto	38	390	3,446	18
4	Enhypen	"Bite Me"	2 紅色Bites (Rainbow Bites)	630	352	Vocal 6	Koshimizu Ren	58	410	3,466	12
4	Enhypen	"Bite Me"	2 紅色Bites (Rainbow Bites)	630	352	Vocal 7	Imae Rikuto	34	386	3,442	20
5	INI	"Loud"	1 BE PLoud	633	347	Vocal 1	Shinogaya Ayumu	28	375	3,416	30
5	INI	"Loud"	1 BE PLoud	633	347	Vocal 2	Ishida Ryota	12	359	3,400	32
5	INI	"Loud"	1 BE PLoud	633	347	Vocal 3	Kobayashi Chisato	87	434	3,475	10
5	INI	"Loud"	1 BE PLoud	633	347	Vocal 4	Nishizaki Shu	31	378	3,419	26
5	INI	"Loud"	1 BE PLoud	633	347	Rapper 1	Kwak Dong-min	42	389	3,430	24
5	INI	"Loud"	1 BE PLoud	633	347	Rapper 2	Obayashi Yusei	59	406	3,447	16
5	INI	"Loud"	1 BE PLoud	633	347	Rapper 3	Horino Ren	27	374	3,415	31
5	INI	"Loud"	2 フレフレラウダーズ (Furefure Louders)	391	283	Vocal 1	Sano Yusei	22	305	—N/a	85
5	INI	"Loud"	2 フレフレラウダーズ (Furefure Louders)	391	283	Vocal 2	Okamoto Takuto	19	302	—N/a	87
5	INI	"Loud"	2 フレフレラウダーズ (Furefure Louders)	391	283	Vocal 3	Miyazaki Shinsuke	8	291	—N/a	89
5	INI	"Loud"	2 フレフレラウダーズ (Furefure Louders)	391	283	Vocal 4	Suekawa Eita	16	299	—N/a	88
5	INI	"Loud"	2 フレフレラウダーズ (Furefure Louders)	391	283	Rapper 1	Ko Keishin	7	290	—N/a	91
5	INI	"Loud"	2 フレフレラウダーズ (Furefure Louders)	391	283	Rapper 2	Hirashima Hikaru	28	311	—N/a	82
5	INI	"Loud"	2 フレフレラウダーズ (Furefure Louders)	391	283	Rapper 3	Muramatsu Haruku	8	291	—N/a	89
6	Stray Kids	"Case 143"	1 Re:TRuST	545	304	Vocal 1	Morii Teru	11	315	2,315	50
6	Stray Kids	"Case 143"	1 Re:TRuST	545	304	Vocal 2	Yamane Musashi	10	314	2,314	51
6	Stray Kids	"Case 143"	1 Re:TRuST	545	304	Rapper 1	Okada Hyugo	175	479	2,479	40
6	Stray Kids	"Case 143"	1 Re:TRuST	545	304	Rapper 2	Kobayashi Rento	15	319	2,319	48
6	Stray Kids	"Case 143"	1 Re:TRuST	545	304	Rapper 3	Ueno Rui	16	320	2,320	47
6	Stray Kids	"Case 143"	1 Re:TRuST	545	304	Rapper 4	Kai Rikuya	14	318	2,318	49
6	Stray Kids	"Case 143"	2 上等Kids(♡) (Joutou Kids)	475	328	Vocal 1	Tono Sota	11	339	—N/a	76
6	Stray Kids	"Case 143"	2 上等Kids(♡) (Joutou Kids)	475	328	Vocal 2	Kurosaki Kanta	54	382	—N/a	64
6	Stray Kids	"Case 143"	2 上等Kids(♡) (Joutou Kids)	475	328	Rapper 1	Hamada Towa	46	374	—N/a	67
6	Stray Kids	"Case 143"	2 上等Kids(♡) (Joutou Kids)	475	328	Rapper 2	Takamatsu Keisuke	14	342	—N/a	75
6	Stray Kids	"Case 143"	2 上等Kids(♡) (Joutou Kids)	475	328	Rapper 3	Kanakura Takumi	16	344	—N/a	73
6	Stray Kids	"Case 143"	2 上等Kids(♡) (Joutou Kids)	475	328	Rapper 4	Hatoba Rikuto	6	334	—N/a	77
7	Sekai no Owari	"The Peak" (最高到達点)	1; 1Peak	556	343 (Note: With a tie in the "Free Part" vote, 1Peak's "Free Part" vote was doubled.)	Vocal 1	Morii Teru	45	388	2,731	35
7	Sekai no Owari	"The Peak" (最高到達点)	1; 1Peak	556	343	Vocal 2	Kojima Ayumu	18	361	2,704	39
7	Sekai no Owari	"The Peak" (最高到達点)	1; 1Peak	556	343	Vocal 3	Katsuki Seita	29	372	2,715	37
7	Sekai no Owari	"The Peak" (最高到達点)	1; 1Peak	556	343	Vocal 4	Yamashita Shu	24	367	2,710	38
7	Sekai no Owari	"The Peak" (最高到達点)	1; 1Peak	556	343	Vocal 5	Okado Ryuga	62	405	2,748	34
7	Sekai no Owari	"The Peak" (最高到達点)	1; 1Peak	556	343	Vocal 6	Uno Kaimu	35	378	2,721	36
7	Sekai no Owari	"The Peak" (最高到達点)	2 新世界マリーンズ (Shinsekai Marines)	527	343	Vocal 1	Iizuka Ryoga	70	413	—N/a	57
7	Sekai no Owari	"The Peak" (最高到達点)	2 新世界マリーンズ (Shinsekai Marines)	527	343	Vocal 2	Ono Keito	67	410	—N/a	58
7	Sekai no Owari	"The Peak" (最高到達点)	2 新世界マリーンズ (Shinsekai Marines)	527	343	Vocal 3	Ichikawa Daiki	14	357	—N/a	69
7	Sekai no Owari	"The Peak" (最高到達点)	2 新世界マリーンズ (Shinsekai Marines)	527	343	Vocal 4	Aonuma Koshiro	18	361	—N/a	68
7	Sekai no Owari	"The Peak" (最高到達点)	2 新世界マリーンズ (Shinsekai Marines)	527	343	Vocal 5	Masuda Tomoki	9	352	—N/a	70
7	Sekai no Owari	"The Peak" (最高到達点)	2 新世界マリーンズ (Shinsekai Marines)	527	343	Vocal 6	Itakura Yuta	6	349	—N/a	71
8	Wanna One	"Energetic"	1 BLUE STAR BLOOMS flow1	568	380	Vocal 1	Yoon Jae-yong	22	402	—N/a	60
8	Wanna One	"Energetic"	1 BLUE STAR BLOOMS flow1	568	380	Vocal 2	Yada Yoshiki	39	419	—N/a	55
8	Wanna One	"Energetic"	1 BLUE STAR BLOOMS flow1	568	380	Vocal 3	Park Si-young	36	416	—N/a	56
8	Wanna One	"Energetic"	1 BLUE STAR BLOOMS flow1	568	380	Vocal 4	Kato Daiki	29	409	—N/a	59
8	Wanna One	"Energetic"	1 BLUE STAR BLOOMS flow1	568	380	Rapper 1	Abe Yura	42	422	—N/a	54
8	Wanna One	"Energetic"	1 BLUE STAR BLOOMS flow1	568	380	Rapper 2	Ogasawara Giuseppe Kei	20	400	—N/a	61
8	Wanna One	"Energetic"	2 TO BE ENERGY	583	364	Vocal 1	Sugiyama Ryuji	86	450	2,450	41
8	Wanna One	"Energetic"	2 TO BE ENERGY	583	364	Vocal 2	Horio Hijiri	33	397	2,397	44
8	Wanna One	"Energetic"	2 TO BE ENERGY	583	364	Vocal 3	Goto Yuki	38	402	2,402	43
8	Wanna One	"Energetic"	2 TO BE ENERGY	583	364	Vocal 4	Sakurai Fuma	8	372	2,372	46
8	Wanna One	"Energetic"	2 TO BE ENERGY	583	364	Rapper 1	Matsuda Taiga	14	378	2,378	45
8	Wanna One	"Energetic"	2 TO BE ENERGY	583	364	Rapper 2	Tsuchida Osuke	40	404	2,404	42

== Position Battle (Episode 6-7) ==
This match will have the contestants competing within their teams, in the position they're the most confident with, while having to create certain aspects of their performance from scratch. Vocal teams must re-arrange their song to convey tone and emotion, Dance teams must re-choreograph their song to demonstrate their presence, and Rap teams must write their own rap to express personality throughout their song. In addition, one team will perform a Rap & Vocal song, requiring them to perform the two aforementioned positions, and another will perform a Self-Produced song, requiring them to rearrange and write new lyrics from sampled songs. The songs presented for each position are as follows: "Betelgeuse" by Yuuri and "Shukumei" by Official Hige Dandism for the Vocal category, "Be Classic" by JO1, "Natural" by Imagine Dragons, and "Super" by Seventeen for the Dance category, "Dominance" by INI and Work Hard" by Chanmina for the Rap category, "Doctor! Doctor!" by Zerobaseone for the Rap & Vocal category, and "My Grandfather's Clock" for the Self-Produced category. Only nine contestants could select their song and team composition while also being the team leaders: the top two contestants from the first voting period (Kato Daiki and Kenmotsu Kinari respectively), and the highest-scoring contestants from each Group Battle song (Terui Kosuke from "Love Seeker", Iizuka Ryoga from "The Peak", Yanagiya Issa from "Bite Me", Yokoyama Kaname from "Show", Sugiyama Ryuji from "Energetic", Kobayashi Chisato from "Loud", and Tanaka Maki from "Iris Out"). They were sent to a separate room to select their song based on their ranking from the first voting period. The remaining contestants were tasked with conveying their talents by selecting any number of stickers from a wall of expressions and skills, which the team leaders would receive to select their team members anonymously. For each performance, the audience could vote for any number of contestants based on their quality. The contestant with the most votes in each team would earn 10,000 benefit points, while the team with the most audience votes would earn 50,000 benefit points. After the performances, only 35 contestants would be able to move onto the next round. The remaining 15 contestants would be eliminated from the show.

- Winner
- Leader
- Center
- Leader and Center

Position Battle
Performance			Team	Result	Contestants		
#	Original artist(s)	Song	Name	Votes	Votes with benefits/deductions	Position	Name
1	INI	DOMINANCE	PUNCH LINERS	380	—N/a	Sub Rapper	Sugiyama Ryuji
1	INI	DOMINANCE	PUNCH LINERS	426	10,426	Main Rapper	Obayashi Yusei
1	INI	DOMINANCE	PUNCH LINERS	405	—N/a	Sub Rapper	Yamashita Shu
1	INI	DOMINANCE	PUNCH LINERS	238	—N/a	Sub Rapper	Fujimaki Taiga
1	INI	DOMINANCE	PUNCH LINERS	309	—N/a	Sub Rapper	Takahashi Sora
2	Seventeen	손오공 (Super)	SEVENKING	418	10,418	Sub Dancer	Terui Kosuke
2	Seventeen	손오공 (Super)	SEVENKING	415	—N/a	Main Dancer	Yoo Hyeonseung
2	Seventeen	손오공 (Super)	SEVENKING	356	—N/a	Sub Dancer	Aonuma Koshiro
2	Seventeen	손오공 (Super)	SEVENKING	291	—N/a	Sub Dancer	Matsuda Taiga
2	Seventeen	손오공 (Super)	SEVENKING	232	—N/a	Sub Dancer	Sawai Sena
2	Seventeen	손오공 (Super)	SEVENKING	293	—N/a	Sub Dancer	Ohse Rinto
2	Seventeen	손오공 (Super)	SEVENKING	307	—N/a	Sub Dancer	Chuang Jay
3	Official Hige Dandism	宿命 (Shukumei)	チアトレーニーズ (Cheer Trainees)	303	—N/a	Sub Vocalist	Iizuka Ryoga
3	Official Hige Dandism	宿命 (Shukumei)	チアトレーニーズ (Cheer Trainees)	249	—N/a	Sub Vocalist	Ono Keito
3	Official Hige Dandism	宿命 (Shukumei)	チアトレーニーズ (Cheer Trainees)	336	—N/a	Sub Vocalist	Goto Yuki
3	Official Hige Dandism	宿命 (Shukumei)	チアトレーニーズ (Cheer Trainees)	433	10,433	Main Vocalist	Yoon Jaeyong
3	Official Hige Dandism	宿命 (Shukumei)	チアトレーニーズ (Cheer Trainees)	360	—N/a	Sub Vocalist	Minamihira Tatsuya
4	Imagine Dragons	Natural	Nature Self	384	50,384	Main Dancer	Abe Yura
4	Imagine Dragons	Natural	Nature Self	394	50,394	Sub Dancer	Chen Rickey
4	Imagine Dragons	Natural	Nature Self	402	60,402	Sub Dancer	Asaka Kotaro
4	Imagine Dragons	Natural	Nature Self	327	50,327	Sub Dancer	Kobayashi Chisato
4	Imagine Dragons	Natural	Nature Self	350	50,350	Sub Dancer	Ishida Ryota
4	Imagine Dragons	Natural	Nature Self	291	50,291	Sub Dancer	Li Weize
5	JO1	BE CLASSIC	101交響楽団 (101 Symphony Orchestra)	388	10,388	Sub Dancer	Kenmotsu Kinari
5	JO1	BE CLASSIC	101交響楽団 (101 Symphony Orchestra)	315	—N/a	Main Dancer	Kurahashi Goten
5	JO1	BE CLASSIC	101交響楽団 (101 Symphony Orchestra)	262	—N/a	Sub Dancer	Koshimizu Ren
5	JO1	BE CLASSIC	101交響楽団 (101 Symphony Orchestra)	341	—N/a	Sub Dancer	Imae Rikuto
5	JO1	BE CLASSIC	101交響楽団 (101 Symphony Orchestra)	353	—N/a	Sub Dancer	Kwak Dongmin
5	JO1	BE CLASSIC	101交響楽団 (101 Symphony Orchestra)	369	—N/a	Sub Dancer	Okada Yuma
5	JO1	BE CLASSIC	101交響楽団 (101 Symphony Orchestra)	295	—N/a	Sub Dancer	Kaneyasu Junsei
6	-	My Grandfather's Clock	FOR:ever	365	10,365	Performance Director	Adam Nagai
6	-	My Grandfather's Clock	FOR:ever	348	—N/a	-	Archer Uy
6	-	My Grandfather's Clock	FOR:ever	299	—N/a	-	Itakura Yuta
6	-	My Grandfather's Clock	FOR:ever	288	—N/a	-	Tanaka Maki
6	-	My Grandfather's Clock	FOR:ever	256	—N/a	-	Uno Kaimu
7	Chanmina	WORK HARD	MVR	345	—N/a	Sub Rapper	Kumabe Takuto
7	Chanmina	WORK HARD	MVR	394	10,394	Sub Rapper	Hamada Towa
7	Chanmina	WORK HARD	MVR	352	—N/a	Sub Rapper	Yokoyama Kaname
7	Chanmina	WORK HARD	MVR	390	—N/a	Main Rapper	Ogasawara Giuseppe Kei
7	Chanmina	WORK HARD	MVR	148	—N/a	Sub Rapper	Mori Mei
7	Chanmina	WORK HARD	MVR	294	—N/a	Sub Rapper	Nishizaki Shu
8	Yuuri	べテルギウス (Betelgeuse)	TEAMきらふわ	342	—N/a	Sub Vocalist	Yanagiya Issa
8	Yuuri	べテルギウス (Betelgeuse)	TEAMきらふわ	388	10,388	Main Vocalist	Lee Hyunjae
8	Yuuri	べテルギウス (Betelgeuse)	TEAMきらふわ	284	—N/a	Sub Vocalist	Shinogaya Ayumu
8	Yuuri	べテルギウス (Betelgeuse)	TEAMきらふわ	339	—N/a	Sub Vocalist	Liu Kaichi
9	Zerobaseone	Doctor! Doctor!	LOVE MANUAL	398	10,365	-	Kato Daiki
9	Zerobaseone	Doctor! Doctor!	LOVE MANUAL	302	—N/a	-	Yada Yoshiki
9	Zerobaseone	Doctor! Doctor!	LOVE MANUAL	395	—N/a	-	Oh Shinhaeng
9	Zerobaseone	Doctor! Doctor!	LOVE MANUAL	380	—N/a	-	Park Siyoung
9	Zerobaseone	Doctor! Doctor!	LOVE MANUAL	351	—N/a	-	Tsuchida Osuke
