= I Hate This Love Song =

2025 single by Chanmina

Single by Chanmina
- Language: Japanese; English
- Released: May 30, 2025
- Length: 3:18
- Label: No Label; Mastersix
- Songwriters: Mina Otomonai; Ryosuke Sakai
- Producers: Ryosuke "Dr. R" Sakai; Chanmina

Chanmina singles chronology
"Work Hard" (2025)	"I Hate This Love Song" (2025)	"I Love You" (2025)

"I Hate This Love Song" (stylized in sentence case) is a song recorded by South Korean-Japanese rapper and singer Chanmina, released on May 30, 2025, via No Label Music and Mastersix Foundation. Written and produced by Chanmina alongside Ryosuke "Dr. R" Sakai, "I Hate This Love Song" served as the image song for the 2025 Japanese film adaptation of I Have a Secret (か「」く「」し「」ご「」と「, Kakushi Goto).

== Background and release ==
In early April, Chanmina announced she wrote a song, "I Hate This Love Song", for the film adaptation of the Japanese novel I Have a Secret. Chanmina revealed the song would be her first to be used as an image song for a film. A trailer was released teasing an excerpt of the song. Later that month, she released "Work Hard", the opening theme song for the Japanese original net animation series Bullet/Bullet. In mid-May, Chanmina's management revealed the release date for "I Hate This Love Song". The song was released digitally on May 30, the same day I Have a Secret was released to Japanese theaters. A partial lyric video using clips from the film was released on May 30.

== Lyrics ==
In a press release, Chanmina shared she based the lyrics for "I Hate This Love Song" on her first love.

== Cover art ==
The cover art for "I Hate This Love Song" depicts half of a frozen pendant in the shape of a heart with the letters "ve" carved out of the word "love". The pendant resembles one that Chanmina wore during her first relationship.

== Charts ==
Chart performance for "I Hate This Love Song"
Chart (2025)	Peak position
Japan (Japan Hot 100)	33
Japan Combined Singles (Oricon)	40

== Release history ==
Release history and formats for "I Hate This Love Song"
Region	Date	Format	Version	Label	Ref.
Various	May 30, 2025	Digital download; streaming	Original	No Label; Mastersix	
Various	June 27, 2025	Digital download; streaming	Acoustic	No Label; Mastersix	
