= Legend (Chanmina album) =

2026 studio album by Chanmina

Studio album by Chanmina
- Released: November 11, 2026
- Recorded: c. 2025–2026
- Length: 39:45
- Languages: Japanese; English; Korean
- Label: No Label
- Producers: Ryosuke "Dr. R" Sakai; Jigg; Masaki Hori; Natsuhiko Okamura; Softserveboy; Stevencastle; Opro; Slay; Avin; Alex Keem; Emerald Royce; Zen; Sangwoo Lee; Prion Heart; Sqvare; Kosuke Crane

Chanmina chronology
Area of Diamond 3 (2026)	Legend (2026)

Singles from Legend
- 1. "Work Hard" Released: April 30, 2025; 2. "I Love You" Released: October 10, 2025; 3. "Test Me" Released: January 14, 2026; 4. "Flip Flap" Released: February 4, 2026; 5. "Let You Go" Released: March 8, 2026; 6. "Legend" Released: October 14, 2026

Legend is the fifth studio album by South Korean-Japanese rapper and singer Chanmina. It was released digitally on November 11, 2026, and will be physically released on December 16, 2026, via No Label Music. The album is her first after she departed from Warner Music Japan.

== Background ==
Chanmina had been signed to Warner Music Japan since 2018. In 2023, she formed her own vanity label under Warner, No Label Music, and later released her fourth studio album, Naked. The album was moderately successful, debuting at number 16 on the Oricon Albums Chart. Near the end of 2023, Chanmina released a live album from her Area of Diamond Tour. In 2024, Chanmina released a series of singles: "Forgive Me", "20" with Ash Island, "NG" and "Forever". Near the end of 2024, she and rapper Sky-Hi announced No No Girls, a survival style show to determine the members of a girl group.

In 2025, Chanmina formed the girl group Hana, consisting of finalists from No No Girls. By April, Chanmina announced her departure from Warner and signed a new deal with Sony Music Labels. As part of her deal, Chanmina relaunched her vanity label under Sony.

== Release and promotion ==
Legend was originally scheduled for release in spring 2026. In an interview with Numéro Tokyo, Chanmina confirmed she was working on her fifth studio album, but explained she "didn't want to rush things this time." She shared that producing for Hana made it difficult to work on her own album simultaneously. By June 2026, Chanmina shared in a press release that she was on vocal rest due to a recent hypothyroidism diagnosis.

On October 14, her 28th birthday, Chanmina announced that Legend would be released digitally on November 11 with a CD release on December 16. The album's CD variant will have two versions: a regular and limited edition. The limited edition of Legend comes in a box set that includes various merchandise. Additional first press bonus goods were later announced, including a photo card, shoulder bag, poster and stickers.

=== Singles ===
Six singles were released from Legend. The lead single "Work Hard", released in April 2025, served as the opening theme song for the Japanese original net animation series Bullet/Bullet. The second single, "I Love You", served as the theme for the Japanese drama series Fake Mommy while the third single "Test Me" served as the opening theme for the third season of animated series Oshi no Ko. "Flip Flap", which was released in February 2026, served as the fourth single and was used in a commercial tie-up for Sony's Nuro Hikari. A fifth single "Let You Go" featuring Hiroto of Japanese boy group INI was released on March 8, the ninth anniversary of Chanmina's debut. Following the release date announcement for Legend in October, the title track was released as the sixth single.

== Track listing ==
Legend track listing
No.	Title	Writer(s)	Producer(s)	Length
1.	"Name Card"	Mina Otomonai; Alex Keem; Prion Heart; Sqvare	Keem; Heart; Sqvare	2:33
2.	"Malibu"	Otomonai; Jigg	Jigg	2:26
3.	"Crashed"	Otomonai; Derek Tyler Carter; Kosuke Crane; Zen	Crane; Emerald Royce; Zen	3:21
4.	"Let You Go"	Otomonai; Nishi Hiroto; Sangwoo Lee; Jigg	Jigg	3:36
5.	"Test Me"	Otomonai; Ryosuke Sakai	Sakai	2:52
6.	"Flip Flap"	Otomonai; Nick Lee; Softserveboy	Softserveboy	2:29
7.	"Work Hard"	Otomonai; Avin; Opro; Slay; Stevencastle	Stevencastle; Slay; Avin; Opro; Chanmina	2:52
8.	"Doshita?" (どした?)	Otomonai; Jigg	Jigg	2:31
9.	"Lonely"	Otomonai; Carter; S. Lee	S. Lee	3:23
10.	"Mom" (엄마)	Otomonai	Chanmina	3:29
11.	"I Love You"	Otomonai; Jigg	Jigg	3:32
12.	"History"	Otomonai; Carter; Crane; Zen	Crane; Royce; Zen	2:56
13.	"Legend"	Otomonai; Akinori Handa; Masaki Hori; Natsuhiko Okamura; S. Lee	Hori; Okamura	3:43
Total length:				39:45

== Charts ==
Chart performance for Legend
Chart (2026)	Peak position
Japanese Combined Albums (Oricon)	37
Japanese Hot Albums (Billboard Japan)	5

== Release history ==
Release history and formats for Legend
Region	Date	Format(s)	Version	Label	Ref.
Various	November 11, 2026	Digital download; streaming	Standard	No Label	
Japan	December 16, 2026	CD	Standard	No Label	
Japan	December 16, 2026	CD	Limited	No Label	
