= Test Me (Chanmina song) =

2026 single by Chanmina

Single by Chanmina

from the album Legend
- Released: January 14, 2026
- Length: 2:51
- Label: No Label; Mastersix Foundation
- Composers: Mina Otomonai; Ryosuke Sakai
- Lyricist: Mina Otomonai
- Producers: Ryosuke "Dr. R" Sakai; Chanmina

Chanmina singles chronology
"I Love You" (2025)	"Test Me" (2026)	"Flip Flap" (2026)

Music video
- "Test Me" on YouTube

"Test Me" is a song by South Korean and Japanese rapper and singer Chanmina, released on January 14, 2026, via No Label Music and Mastersix Foundation. The song serves as the opening theme song for the third season of the Japanese animated series Oshi no Ko.

== Background and release ==
In October 2025, Crunchyroll announced that the service would stream the third season of the anime series Oshi no Ko. The series was previously streamed on Hidive. Later in November 2025, various Japanese news outlets reported that the third season of Oshi no Ko would start airing on January 14, 2026. Within the same day, the ending theme song was revealed to be "Serenade" by Natori. On December 22, a 10-second teaser was released regarding the opening song and artist. On December 28, Japanese news outlets reported Chanmina would perform the opening theme song, "Test Me". A second teaser of the anime was released featuring a snippet of "Test Me".

"Test Me" was released on January 14, 2026, as a digital single.

== Personnel ==
- Chanmina – vocals, production
- Ryosuke "Dr. R" Sakai – arrangement, production
- Masaki Hori – drums
- Natsuhiko Okamura – guitar
- Shige Murata – bass
- Koichi Mizukami – piano

== Charts ==
Chart performance for "Test Me"
Chart (2026)	Peak position
Japan (Oricon)	38
Japan Combined Singles (Oricon)	32
Japan Anime Singles (Oricon)	14
Japan Hot 100 (Billboard)	22
Japan Hot Animation (Billboard Japan)	9

== Release history ==
Release history and formats for "Test Me"
Region	Date	Format	Label	Ref.
Various	January 14, 2026	Digital download; streaming	No Label; Mastersix Foundation	
