= Bijin (song) =

2021 single by Chanmina

- Standard edition cover

Single by Chanmina

from the album Harenchi
- Language: Japanese; English
- Released: April 14, 2021
- Genre: Hip-hop
- Length: 2:39
- Label: Warner Japan
- Composer: Ryosuke Sakai
- Lyricist: Mina Otomonai
- Producer: Ryosuke "Dr. R" Sakai

Chanmina singles chronology
"Holy Moly Holy Night" (2020)	"Bijin" (2021)	"Tokyo 4AM" (2022)

Music video
- "Bijin" on YouTube

"Bijin" (美人; lit. 'a beautiful person'; stylized in all upper cased lettering) is a song recorded by South Korean-Japanese rapper and singer Chanmina, released on April 14, 2021, by Warner Music Japan. Inspired by the feminine beauty ideal, the lyrics are about her scrutiny towards the social norm of women following beauty standards. With production handled by Ryosuke "Dr. R" Sakai, "Bijin" subsequently served as the second and final single for Chanmina's third studio album, Harenchi (2021).

== Background and release ==
Chanmina released her second physical single "Angel" in late 2020, which was used by Monster Energy as a commercial tie-in. In February 2021, Chanmina announced the release of a new single. In a press release, her staff shared that "Bijin" would be released digitally in March while a physical CD would be released in April with three B-side tracks, the R&B ballad "Needy", "Morning Mood", and "Dahlia".

"Bijin" was released digitally on March 19, 2021, initially as a promotional single. It was later released as a maxi single on April 14, 2021. A limited-edition version of the single included a bonus DVD of footage from Chanmina's The Princess Project. Bonus first press goods included a key ring and sticker.

== Music and lyrics ==
Musically, "Bijin" is a hip-hop song. Lyrically, the song condemns the feminine beauty ideal. Chanmina based the lyrics on others negatively perceiving her physical appearance. "Bijin" makes references to Leonardo da Vinci's paintings with the lyrics: "This isn't how I should look, da Vinci / Make me look just a little bit prettier / Add some contrast in there, too / I wanna show the world just how beautiful I am" (こんなはずないわよダヴィンチ / もう少しだけべっぴんに / コントラストも入れて頂戴 / 全世界を懲らしめたい). Primarily in Japanese, "Bijin" blends English phrases within its verses. In an interview with Cinra, Chanmina described receiving cynical comments of her appearance when she debuted in 2016. She makes references to this with the third verse of "Bijin": "Remember what you said to me / You can't be beautiful / You can't be famous / An ugly bitch like you shouldn't be a singer" (あの時言ったよな / You can't be beautiful / You can't be famous / 醜いブスが歌ってんじゃないよ). Uncomfortable with the change of heart on her later look, she was inspired to write "Bijin" after receiving both negative and positive comments of her physical attractiveness.

== Promotion ==
"Bijin" was used by Abema as the theme song for GX - Densetsu no Kyaba Jō ga On'nanoko o Daikaikaku.

== Music video ==
A music video for "Bijin" premiered on Chanmina's YouTube channel on March 19. Directed by Yuki Tsujimoto, the music video is set in an alternative universe of feudal Japan where "the concept of beauty is strictly defined". Chanmina plays the role of a noble lady with Masahiro Takashima as her beauty advisor. The music video was later age-restricted by YouTube due to a scene where Chanmina hangs herself.

In May 2021, a choreography video from the music video of "Bijin" was released on Chanmina's YouTube channel.

== Live performances ==
Chanmina performed "Bijin" on the 210th episode of The First Take. In 2023, during her first concert tour, Area of Diamond, Chanmina performed "Bijin". Her performance of "Bijin" at the Yokohama Arena received heavy coverage after she stopped performing mid-way and begun to remove her makeup while on stage.

== Commercial performance ==
Following its physical release, "Bijin" debuted and peaked at number 15 on the Oricon Singles Chart. It initially failed to enter the Billboard Japan Hot 100 until a year after its release following a performance of the song on The First Take. Following Chanmina's appearance on the YouTube channel, the music video for "Bijin" surged in views, gaining over 2 million views in a week. The song later went on to debut and peak at number 65 on the Billboard Japan Hot 100.

== Track listing ==
- Digital download, streaming and CD
1. "Bijin" – 2:39
2. "Needy" – 3:08
3. "Morning Mood" – 2:59
4. "Dahlia" – 3:33

== Charts ==
Chart performance for "Bijin"
Chart (2021–2022)	Peak position
Japan (Japan Hot 100)	65
Japan (Oricon)	15

== Certifications ==
Certifications for "Bijin"
Region	Certification	Certified units/sales
Streaming
Japan (RIAJ)	Platinum	100,000,000^{†}
^{†} Streaming-only figures based on certification alone.

== Awich remix ==
"Bijin (remix)"

Promotional single by Chanmina featuring Awich

from the album Naked
- Language: Japanese; English
- Released: April 10, 2023
- Length: 2:40
- Label: No Label; Warner Japan
- Songwriters: Mina Otomonai; Akiko Urasaki
- Producer: Ryosuke "Dr. R" Sakai

On April 10, 2023, Chanmina released a remix of "Bijin" featuring Japanese rapper Awich. The remix was released by No Label Music and Warner Music Japan, as a promotional single for Chanmina's fourth studio album, Naked (2023).

=== Background and release ===
In a press release on March 21, 2023, Chanmina announced her fourth studio album, Naked. Sharing the launch of her own record label, she revealed the track listing of the album, including a remix of "Bijin" with Awich.

During an encore performance at her Area of Diamond Tour in Yokohama, Chanmina performed "Bijin" for a second time in a different rendition. After its chorus, she announced the surprise appearance of Awich. The pair performed the song as a duet.

On April 10, the remix version of "Bijin" was released digitally as a promotional single.

== Release history ==
Release history and formats for "Bijin"
Region	Date	Format(s)	Version	Label	Ref.
Various	March 19, 2021	Digital download; streaming	Promotional single	Warner	
Japan	April 14, 2021	Digital download; streaming	EP	Warner	
Japan	April 14, 2021	CD	Maxi single	Warner	
Japan	April 14, 2021	CD; DVD	Limited maxi single	Warner	
Various	May 27, 2022	Digital download; streaming	The First Take	Warner	
Various	April 10, 2023	Digital download; streaming	Remix	No Label; Warner	
