= I Wonder =

I Wonder may refer to:

== Songs ==
- "I Wonder" (1944 song), a song by Pvt. Cecil Gant; covered by Roosevelt Sykes (1945) and several others
- "I Wonder" (Da-ice song), 2024
- "I Wonder" (Kanye West song), 2007
- "I Wonder" (Kellie Pickler song), 2007
- "I Wonder" (Rosanne Cash song), 1982
- "I Wonder (Departure)", by ABBA, 1977
- "I Wonder", by Blind Melon from Blind Melon, 1992
- "I Wonder", by BoyNextDoor from Home, 2026
- "I Wonder", by Chris Isaak from the Tin Cup film soundtrack, 1996
- "I Wonder..." by Da Pump, 2000
- "I Wonder", by Diffuser from Making the Grade, 2003
- "I Wonder", by Golden Earring from Miracle Mirror, 2009 reissue
- "I Wonder", by Gotthard from Lipservice, 2005
- "I Wonder", by Great Gable from Tracing Faces, 2020
- "I Wonder", by Madison Beer from Silence Between Songs, 2023
- "I Wonder", by Pitbull from M.I.A.M.I., 2004
- "I Wonder", by Sixto Rodriguez from Cold Fact, 1970
- "I Wonder", from the film Sleeping Beauty, 1959
- "I Wonder", written by Irving Berlin

== Other uses ==
- "I wonder, I wonder?", a phrase used by Rena Ryūgū in the anime Higurashi When They Cry
