= Harenchi =

2021 studio album by Chanmina

- Standard edition cover

Studio album by Chanmina
- Released: October 13, 2021
- Recorded: 2020–2021
- Length: 49:36
- Languages: Japanese; English
- Label: Warner Japan
- Producers: Jigg; Ryosuke "Dr. R" Sakai; Bena; Tido; Adam Kapit

Chanmina chronology
Note-book: Me. Note-book: U. (2020)	Harenchi (2021)	Naked (2023)

Singles from Harenchi
- 1. "Angel" Released: September 9, 2020; 2. "Bijin" Released: April 14, 2021

Harenchi (ハレンチ; lit. 'shameless') is the third studio album by South Korean-Japanese rapper and singer Chanmina, released on October 13, 2021, by Warner Music Japan. Led by two singles, "Angel" and "Bijin", the album includes songs from Chanmina's 2020 extended plays (EPs) Note-book: Me. and Note-book: U. as well as B-side track "Morning Mood" first released with its A-side "Bijin".

== Background ==
Following the release of her second studio album in August 2019, Never Grow Up, Chanmina released the EPs Note-book: Me. and Note-book: U. simultaneously in February 2020. In July, Chanmina announced her second physical single, "Angel", which served as the tie-in song for Monster Energy's Ultra Paradise drink. In 2021, she announced her third physical single, "Bijin". In August 2021, Chanmina announced her third studio album, Harenchi, would be released on October 13. A full track list was revealed the following month. In October, she held the final concert tour at Nippon Budokan for The Princess Project.

== Release and promotion ==
Harenchi was released on October 13, 2021. Prior to its release, Warner Japan revealed limited bonus goods for its physical first press release. Early reservations of the album included a smartphone hand strap while other storefronts such as Amazon included a mega jacket. Standard retail chains included a sticker sheet. The standard edition of Harenchi includes 16 tracks while its physical limited edition features a bonus DVD of live performance footage from The Princess Project, Chanmina's concert tour, at the Nakano Sunplaza.

=== Singles ===
Two singles were released from Harenchi. "Angel" was first released digitally on July 24, 2020, and later was physically released as the lead single on September 9, 2020. "Bijin" was released digitally on March 19, 2021, later receiving a physical release on April 14, as the second single. Both singles were moderately successful, each peaking at number 15 on the Oricon Singles Chart.

Promotional singles "Voice Memo No. 5" from Note-book: Me. and "Picky" from Note-book U. were included on the album. A third promotional single, the album's title track, was issued a month prior to release of the album.

== Commercial performance ==
Upon its release, Harenchi debuted and peaked at number 16 on the Oricon Albums Chart. On the Billboard Japan Hot Albums chart, Harenchi debuted at number 11.

Following the broadcasting of girl group audition program No No Girls organized by B-Rave with production handled by Chanmina, Harenchi saw new commercial success three years after its release. In December 2024, Harenchi re-entered the Hot Albums chart at number 66. The album reached a new peak on the Hot Albums chart at number 5 for the week of February 10, 2025.

== Track listing ==
Harenchi track listing
No.	Title	Writer(s)	Producer(s)	Length
1.	"Sun" (太陽)	Mina Otomonai; Amp Killer; Jigg	Jigg	3:13
2.	"Angel"	Otomonai; Ryosuke Sakai	Sakai	3:12
3.	"A Present from Him" (君からの贈り物)	Otomonai; Sakai	Sakai	3:05
4.	"Harenchi" (ハレンチ)	Otomonai; Bena	Bena	3:18
5.	"Voice Memo No. 5" (ボイスメモ No. 5)	Otomonai; Rhyan Besco; Sakai	Sakai	2:43
6.	"White Kick" (ホワイトキック)	Otomonai; Jigg	Jigg	2:35
7.	"Period" (ピリオド)	Otomonai; Jigg	Jigg	2:20
8.	"Picky"	Otomonai; Ryan Alan; Tido	Tido	2:51
9.	"Imagination" (想像力)	Otomonai; Jigg	Jigg	2:38
10.	"A Girl of Tokyo" (東京女子)	Otomonai; Sakai	Sakai	3:41
11.	"Distance" (ディスタンス)	Otomonai; Bena	Bena	3:02
12.	"Morning Mood"	Otomonai; Jigg	Jigg	2:59
13.	"^_^"	Otomonai; Adam Kapit; Doug Rockwell; Tova Litvin	Kapit	2:18
14.	"Bijin" (美人)	Otomonai; Sakai	Sakai	2:40
15.	"Firework" (花火)	Otomonai; Sakai	Sakai	3:16
16.	"Never Grow Up" (acoustic version)	Otomonai; Sakai	Sakai	3:45
Total length:				47:36

Harenchi – limited edition DVD bonus live performances from the Princess Project 5
No.	Title	Length
1.	"Angel" (Day)
2.	"Light It Up" (Day)
3.	"Very Nice to Meet You" (Day)
4.	"Needy" (Day)
5.	"Bijin" (Day)
6.	"Dahlia" (Day)
7.	"Rainy Friday" (Day)
8.	"Princess" (Day)
9.	"Never Grow Up" (Night)
10.	"Dahlia" (Night)

Notes

- "Sun", "Distance", and "Bijin" are stylized in all uppercase lettering
- "A Present from Him", "White Kick", and "Morning Mood" are stylized in sentence case lettering
- "Imagination" is stylized in all lowercase lettering

== Personnel ==
Musicians

- Chanmina – vocals (all tracks)
- Amp Killer – guitar (1, 6, 7, 9)
- Jigg – instruments (1, 6, 7, 9, 12)
- Ryosuke "Dr. R" Sakai – instruments (2, 3, 5, 10, 14, 15)
- Bena – instruments (4, 11)
- Shige Murata – bass (4, 11)
- Ko-hei Miyata – cello (4, 11)
- Jota Tokusashi – guitar (4, 11)
- Natsuhiko Okamura – guitar (4, 11)
- Tido – instruments (8)
- Adam Kapit – instruments (13)

Technical

- Chris Gehringer – mastering (all tracks)
- Jigg – programming (1, 6, 6, 9, 12), mixing (1, 6, 6, 9, 12), recording engineer (1, 6, 6, 8, 9, 12, 13)
- Ryosuke "Dr. R" Sakai – mixing (2, 3, 5, 10, 13, 14, 15, 16), programming (2, 3, 5, 10, 14, 15, 16), recording engineer (2, 3, 5, 10, 14, 15, 16)
- Bena – programming (4, 11)
- D.O.I – mixing (4, 11)
- Yukio Iizuka – bass technician (4)
- Tido – mixing, programming (8)
- Adam Kapit – programming (13)

== Charts ==
=== Weekly charts ===
Weekly chart performance for Harenchi
Chart (2021–2025)	Peak position
Japanese Albums (Oricon)	16
Japanese Combined Albums (Oricon)	11
Japanese Hot Albums (Billboard Japan)	5

=== Year-end charts ===
Year-end chart performance for Harenchi
Chart (2025)	Position
Japanese Hot Albums (Billboard Japan)	11

== Release history ==
Release history and formats for Harenchi
Region	Date	Format(s)	Version	Label	Ref.
Various	October 13, 2021	Digital download; streaming	Standard	Warner	
Japan	October 13, 2021	CD	Standard	Warner	
Japan	October 13, 2021	CD; DVD	Limited	Warner	
