= Work Hard (Chanmina song) =

2025 single by Chanmina

Single by Chanmina

from the album Legend
- Language: Japanese; English
- Released: April 30, 2025
- Length: 2:54
- Label: No Label; Mastersix
- Songwriters: Mina Otomonai; Slay; Stevenc4stle; Opro; Avin
- Producers: Stevenc4astle; Slay; Avin; Opro; Chanmina

Chanmina singles chronology
"Forever" (2024)	"Work Hard" (2025)	"I Hate This Love Song" (2025)

Music video
- "Work Hard" on YouTube

"Work Hard" is a song recorded by South Korean-Japanese rapper and singer Chanmina, released on April 30, 2025, via No Label Music and Mastersix Foundation. The song serves as the opening theme for the Japanese original net animation series Bullet/Bullet.

== Background and release ==
Chanmina released a series of singles in 2024, including "NG" and "Forever", which saw mild commercial success on the Billboard Japan Hot 100 charts. Following these releases, her contract with Warner Music Japan expired, leading her to sign with Sony Music Japan sublabel Mastersix Foundation. As part of her record deal, Chanmina relaunched her imprint label No Label Music under Sony. She teased an instrumental snippet of an unreleased song on her social media, later revealed to be "Work Hard". On social media, Chanmina shared that "Work Hard" would serve as the opening theme song for Bullet/Bullet, a Japanese original net animation series.

== Production ==
Sunghoo Park, director of Bullet/Bullet, met with Chanmina and allowed her to view snippets of the series to give her ideas on lyrics. Conveyed about the idea of "working hard", Chanmina based the lyrics on her recent accomplishments from motherhood to producing girl group Hana. She described the song as a "cheer anthem" to "hard workers".

== Music video ==
A music video for "Work Hard" premiered on YouTube on May 14. Directed by Kim Youngjo and You Seungwoo, the video stars Japanese actors Riki Takeuchi, Ikki Sawamura and kickboxer Tenshin Nasukawa. In the music video, Chanmina plays out six various characters. The First Times described the music video for "Work Hard" as "exhilarating" and "both luxurious and hectic". The music video additionally features footage of Chanmina skydiving.

== Live performances ==
Chanmina performed a medley of various songs at the 2025 Music Awards Japan, including "Work Hard". On the 547th episode of The First Take, she performed a live rendition of "Work Hard".

== Release history ==
Release history and formats for "Work Hard"
Region	Date	Format	Label	Ref.
Various	April 30, 2025	Digital download; streaming	No Label; Mastersix	
