= Chanmina =

South Korean-Japanese rapper and singer (born 1998)

- ちゃんみな
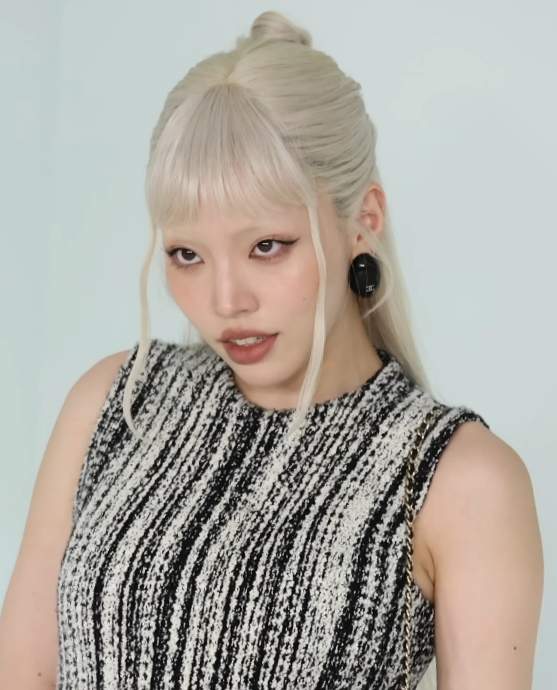
- Chanmina in 2026
- Born: Mina Otomonai; October 14, 1998 (age 28); South Korea
- Citizenship: Japan
- Occupations: Rapper; singer
- Years active: 2016–present
- Spouse: Ash Island (m. 2024)
- Children: 1
- Musical career
- Origin: Nerima, Tokyo
- Genres: Hip-hop; J-pop; alternative rock; R&B; K-pop
- Labels: Victor; Warner Japan; Atlantic Japan; No Label; Mastersix Foundation

Japanese name
- Kanji: 乙茂内 美奈
- Hiragana: おともない みな
- Katakana: オトモナイ ミナ
Transcriptions
- Romanization: Otomonai Mina
- Website: chanmina.com

Mina Otomonai (乙茂内 美奈, Otomonai Mina; born October 14, 1998), known professionally as Chanmina (Japanese: ちゃんみな; Korean: 챤미나), is a South Korean and Japanese rapper and singer. She debuted in 2016 independently, before releasing her major label debut album Miseinen in 2017.

== Life and career ==
=== 1998–2015: Early life ===
Mina Otomonai was born in South Korea, to a Japanese father and a South Korean mother, and lived in South Korea until she was three years old. As her mother is a professional ballerina, she spent her childhood traveling around South Korea, Japan and the United States. Due to her mother's influence, Chanmina began learning ballet, piano and violin from the age of three.

Moving to Nerima, Tokyo during her elementary school years, she discovered the song "Day by Day" (2008) by Korean band Big Bang, and felt moved by the song, inspiring her to become a rapper. Chanmina originally planned to move to South Korea to become a K-pop musician in her second year of high school, however her friend, female rapper Messhi, convinced her to stay in Japan.

=== 2016–2017: Career beginnings and major label debut ===
In 2016, Chanmina participated in Bazooka!!! Kōkōsei Rap Senshūken, a high school rap competition broadcast on BS Sky Perfect!, and her independently released debut single "Miseinen" featuring Messhi, managed to top iTunes Japan's hip-hop song rankings chart. She was a featured artist on TeddyLoid's 2016 single "Daikirai", which was her first major label release.

In January 2017, Chanmina signed a major label record deal with Victor Entertainment. Her solo major label debut single "Fxxker" was released on February 1, 2017, followed by her debut studio album Miseinen on March 8, 2017. Her debut studio album was mildly successful upon its release, peaking at number 59 on the Oricon Albums Chart and number 27 on the Billboard Japan Hot Albums chart. In the same year, Chanmina released her first extended play (EP) Chocolate, which was recorded in Los Angeles. The EP became her first top-ten album, peaking at number ten on the Hot Albums chart. She later appeared as a featured artist on Mivyavi's "No Thanks Ya" from his 2017 studio album, Samurai Sessions Vol. 2.

=== 2018–2024: Label transfer, Never Grow Up, Harenchi, and Naked ===
In 2018, Chanmina departed from Victor Entertainment. Signing with Warner Music Japan sublabel Atlantic Japan, she released her first single under the label, "Doctor". On November 30, 2018, she released "Pain Is Beauty", which she first performed during her Princess Project 2 tour. In January 2019, she announced her first maxi single, "I'm a Pop", released on February 27, 2019. The maxi single included three B-side tracks, including an English version of "Doctor". In June 2019, she announced her second studio album, Never Grow Up. The title song from the album, which was released as a single, was used as the theme song for the Japanese drama Jigoku no Girlfriend and became a sleeper hit, reaching over 10 million views on YouTube eight months after the song's release, and receiving a gold certification for streaming from the Recording Industry Association of Japan (RIAJ). Never Grow Up was released on August 7, 2019, debuting at number 21 on the Hot Albums chart and number 23 on the Oricon Albums Chart.

In December 2019, Chanmina announced the release of two EPs, Note-book: Me. and Note-book: U.. The two EPs were released on February 19, 2020, following the release of two promotional singles "Voice Memo No. 5" from Note-book: Me. and "Picky" from Note-book: U.. She released an acoustic version of "Never Grow Up" in April 2020, following the COVID-19 pandemic resulting in the cancellation of her tour. In July 2020, Chanmina announced her second maxi single, "Angel". A music video for "Angel" was released on July 23, 2020. In September, she released "Rainy Friday", a B-side track from "Angel", as a promotional single. Near the end of 2020, she released a holiday single "Holy Moly Holy Night" with Sky-Hi.

In February 2021, Chanmina announced her third maxi single "Bijin". The single was released on April 14, 2021, initially failing to enter the Billboard Japan Hot 100 until the next year when Chanmina performed the song on The First Take. Following her appearance on the program, the music video for "Bijin" surged in views, gaining over 2 million views in a week. The song later went on to debut and peak at number 65 on the Japan Hot 100. Chanmina also appeared on a remix of Saweetie's "Best Friend", released on April 23, 2021. In May 2021, she announced her first solo concert at Nippon Budokan, The Princess Project: Final. In August 2021, Chanmina announced her third studio album, Harenchi. A full track list was revealed the following month. In September 2021, Chanmina's song "I'm a Pop" was featured in the Netflix film Kate, leading to the song achieving new commercial success in the United States on the Billboard World Digital Songs chart. In October, Chanmina released her third studio album, Harenchi. Following its release, the album debuted at number 16 on the Oricon Albums Chart while debuting at number 11 on the Japan Hot Albums chart.

In August 2022, Chanmina teased her first Korean-language single. In September 2022, she released "Tokyo 4AM", recorded in English and Japanese. The song served as the theme song for the Japanese drama -50kg no Cinderella. Shortly after the release of "Tokyo 4AM", she announced the title of her first Korean single, "Don't Go" featuring Ash Island. She followed "Don't Go" with her second Korean single "Mirror", released in October 2022. On March 8, 2023, Chanmina surprise released the single "You Just Walked In My Life" on her debut anniversary. On March 21, 2023, she announced her third studio album, Naked. Alongside the album announcement, she revealed the launch of her own imprint under Warner Japan, No Label Music. In April, Chanmina released a live video performing an unreleased song, "I'm Not OK". The song was later released as a promotional single to digital stores. Shortly after, she released Naked, which charted within the top 20 of both the Oricon Albums Chart and Hot Albums chart. In August of that year, she released "Death Anniversary", the theme song for the drama Hayabusa Fire Brigade. "Death Anniversary" became her best-performing single on the Japan Hot 100, peaking at number 26. Her third Korean single "Biscuit" was released on November 24, 2023. In 2024, Chanmina released a series of singles: "Forgive Me", "20" with Ash Island, "NG" and "Forever".

=== 2025–present: Transfer to Sony, Legend ===
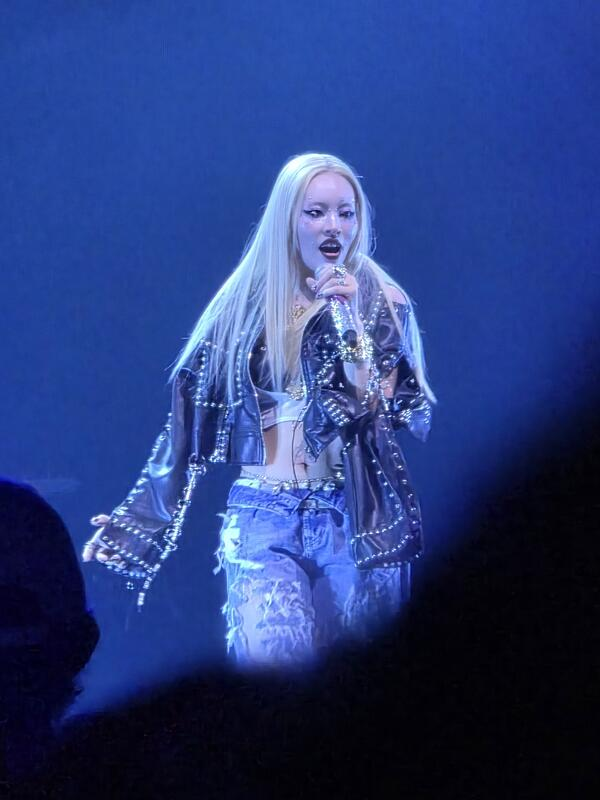
Chanmina performing at Zepp New Taipei, 2025

In January 2025, Chanmina formed the girl group Hana through the audition show No No Girls. In April 2025, Chanmina signed with Sony Music Japan label Mastersix Foundation. Her imprint, No Label Music, relaunched under the record label. She teased a new song on social media, later revealed to be "Work Hard". The song served as the opening theme for the Japanese original net animation series Bullet/Bullet, her first song used for an animated series. In May, she released "I Hate This Love Song", the image song for the 2025 Japanese film adaption of I Have a Secret. In August 2025, she appeared as a featured artist on pH-1's third studio album, What Have We Done, on the track "Baka".

In January 2026, Chanmina released "Test Me", the opening theme song for the third season of Oshi no Ko. On January 30, a large billboard was displayed at department store 109 in Shibuya teasing Chanmina's fifth studio album. Later that day in a press release, she officially announced Legend, originally scheduled for release in the spring. In March and April 2026, Chanmina released the singles "Flip Flap" and "Let You Go" featuring Hiroto of Japanese boy group INI respectfully. By June, no further announcement was made regarding the release of her fifth studio album, however in a press release, Chanmina shared she would no longer perform at the 2026 Music Awards Japan ceremony due to hypothyroidism.

In October 2026, Chanmina announced the release date for Legend, ten months after initially being revealed. The title track from the album was released digitally on October 14. "History" was later released as a promotional single from the album.

== Artistry ==
=== Musical styles ===
Chanmina's discography spans hip-hop, J-pop, alternative rock, R&B, and K-pop genres. Patrick St. Michel of the Japan Times described that "a big part of Chanmina's appeal lies in her balance between pop and hip-hop."

== Personal life ==
Chanmina is trilingual, speaking Korean, Japanese and English. On July 7, 2024, she announced her pregnancy and marriage to Korean rapper Ash Island. On November 1, she gave birth to her first child, a baby girl.

On October 19, 2026, Chanmina was involved in a traffic accident in Shibuya. Following various rumors on social media, Chanmina shared an official statement on X.

== Discography ==
=== Studio albums ===
List of studio albums, with selected chart positions and certifications
Title	Details	Peak chart positions		
Title	Details	JPN	JPN Comb.	JPN Hot
Miseinen (未成年; Underage)	Released: March 8, 2017; Label: Victor; Formats: CD, digital download, streaming	59	—	27
Never Grow Up	Released: August 7, 2019; Label: Warner Japan; Formats: CD, CD+DVD, digital download, streaming	23	13	3
Harenchi	Released: October 13, 2021; Label: Warner; Formats: CD, CD+DVD, digital download, streaming	16	11	5
Naked	Released: April 26, 2023; Label: No Label, Warner; Formats: CD, digital download, streaming	16	12	11
Legend	Released: November 11, 2026; Label: No Label; Formats: CD, digital download, streaming	—	37	5
"—" denotes releases that did not chart.

=== Extended plays ===
List of extended plays, with selected chart positions
Title	Details	Peak chart positions		
Title	Details	JPN	JPN Comb.	JPN Hot
Miseinen EP	Released: March 8, 2017 (Note: The Miseinen EP was released globally excluding Japan.); Label: Victor; Formats: Digital download, streaming	—	—	—
Chocolate	Released: November 15, 2017; Label: Victor; Formats: CD, CD+DVD, digital download, streaming	29	—	10
Note-book: Me.	Released: February 19, 2020; Label: Warner; Formats: CD, digital download, streaming	38	41	— (Note: Note-book: Me. did not enter the Billboard Japan Hot 100 chart, but peaked at number 42 on the Billboard Japan Top Single Sales physical chart.)
Note-book: U.	Released: February 19, 2020; Label: Warner; Formats: CD, digital download, streaming	40	—	— (Note: Note-book: U. did not enter the Billboard Japan Hot 100 chart, but peaked at number 46 on the Billboard Japan Top Single Sales physical chart.)
"—" denotes releases that did not chart.

=== Live albums ===
List of live albums, with selected chart positions
Title	Album details	Peak chart positions	
Title	Album details	JPN DVD	JPN Hot
Area of Diamond	Released: October 25, 2023; Label: No Label, Warner; Formats: DVD, digital download, streaming	5	—
Area of Diamond 2	Released: July 23, 2025 (Note: An audio-only version of Area of Diamond 2 was released digitally on December 24, 2025.); Label: No Label, Warner; Formats: DVD, digital download, streaming	8	—
Area of Diamond 3	Released: December 24, 2025; Label: No Label, Mastersix Foundation; Formats: DVD, digital download, streaming	7	54
"—" denotes releases that did not chart.

=== Video albums ===
List of video albums, with selected chart positions
Title	Album details	Peak chart positions
Title	Album details	JPN DVD
The Princess Project	Released: March 23, 2022; Label: Warner; Formats: DVD, Blu-ray	8
The Princess Project: Final	Released: March 23, 2022; Label: Warner; Formats: DVD, Blu-ray	19

=== Singles ===
==== As lead artist ====
List of singles as lead artist, with selected chart positions, certifications and album name
Title	Year	Peak chart positions				Certifications	Album
Title	Year	JPN	JPN Comb.	JPN Hot	US World	Certifications	Album
"Miseinen" (未成年; "Underage") (featuring Messhi)	2016	—	—	—	—		Miseinen
"Princess"	2016	—	—	—	—		Miseinen
"Fxxker"	2017	—	—	—	—		Miseinen
"Lady"	2017	—	—	75	—	RIAJ: Gold (streaming)	Miseinen
"My Name"	2017	—	—	— (Note: "My Name" did not enter the Billboard Japan Hot 100 chart, but peaked at number 79 on the Billboard Japan Streaming Songs chart.)	—		Chocolate
"Chocolate"	2017	—	—	29	—	RIAJ: Platinum (streaming)	Chocolate
"Doctor"	2018	—	—	— (Note: "Doctor" did not enter the Billboard Japan Hot 100 chart, but peaked at number 75 on the Billboard Japan Streaming Songs chart.)	—		Never Grow Up
"Pain Is Beauty"	2018	—	— (Note: "Pain Is Beauty" did not enter the Oricon Combined Singles Chart, but peaked at number 24 on the Oricon Streaming Chart.)	87	—	RIAJ: Platinum (streaming)	Never Grow Up
"I'm a Pop"	2019	54	—	— (Note: "I'm a Pop" did not enter the Billboard Japan Hot 100 chart, but peaked at number 53 on the Billboard Japan Top Single Sales physical chart.)	16		Never Grow Up
"Call"	2019	—	— (Note: "Call" did not enter the Oricon Combined Singles Chart, but peaked at number 44 on the Oricon Streaming Chart.)	89	—	RIAJ: Gold (streaming)	Never Grow Up
"Never Grow Up"	2019	—	37	40	—	RIAJ: 3× Platinum (streaming)	Never Grow Up
"Angel"	2020	15	28	49	—	RIAJ: Platinum (streaming)	Harenchi
"Holy Moly Holy Night" (with Sky-Hi)	2020	—	—	—	—		Non-album single
"Bijin"	2021	15	—	65	—	RIAJ: Platinum (streaming)	Harenchi
"Tokyo 4AM"	2022	—	—	—	—		Naked
"Don't Go" (featuring Ash Island)	2022	—	—	—	—		Naked
"Mirror"	2022	—	—	—	—		Naked
"You Just Walked in My Life"	2023	—	—	—	—		Naked
"Death Anniversary" (命日, Meinichi)	2023	—	— (Note: "Death Anniversary" did not enter the Oricon Combined Singles Chart, but peaked at number 10 on the Oricon Digital Singles Chart.)	26	—	RIAJ: Gold (streaming)	Non-album singles
"Biscuit"	2023	—	—	—	—		Non-album singles
"Forgive Me"	2024	—	—	—	—		Non-album singles
"20" (with Ash Island)	2024	—	—	—	—		Non-album singles
"NG"	2024	—	—	70	—	RIAJ: Gold (streaming)	Non-album singles
"Forever"	2024	—	—	33	—		Non-album singles
"Work Hard"	2025	—	—	—	—		Legend
"I Hate This Love Song"	2025	—	40	33	—		Non-album single
"I Love You"	2025	—	—	92	—		Legend
"Test Me"	2026	—	32	22	—		Legend
"Flip Flap"	2026	—	—	— (Note: "Flip Flap" did not enter the Billboard Japan Hot 100 chart, but peaked at number 81 on the Billboard Japan Download Songs chart.)	—		Legend
"Let You Go" (featuring Hiroto of INI)	2026	—	—	54	—		Legend
"Legend"	2026	—	—	—	—		Legend
"—" denotes items that did not chart.

==== As featured artist ====
List of singles as featured artist, with selected chart positions, certifications and album name
Title	Year	Peak chart positions		Certifications	Album
Title	Year	JPN	JPN Hot	Certifications	Album
"#GirlsSpkOut" (Taeyeon featuring Chanmina)	2020	—	—		GirlsSpkOut
"Kisha na Lip" (華奢なリップ; "Delicate Lip") (Genie High featuring Chanmina)	2021	—	83	RIAJ: Gold (streaming)	Genie Star
"Smiley (Japanese Version)" (Yena featuring Chanmina)	2023	10	— (Note: "Smiley (Japanese Version)" did not enter the Billboard Japan Hot 100, but peaked at number 12 on the Billboard Japan Heatseekers Songs chart.)		Non-album single
"World Dance" (Ai featuring Chanmina)	2023	—	—		Respect All
"—" denotes items that did not chart.

==== Promotional singles ====
List of promotional singles, with selected chart positions, certifications and album name
Title	Year	Peak chart positions		Certifications	Album
Title	Year	JPN Comb.	JPN Hot	Certifications	Album
"She's Gone"	2016	—	—		Miseinen
"Daikirai" (ダイキライ; "Hate") (TeddyLoid featuring Chanmina)	2016	—	—		Silent Planet 2 EP Vol. 3 & Miseinen
"Winner" (Block B Project-1 featuring Chanmina)	2017	—	76		Project-1 EP
"Voice Memo No. 5" (ボイスメモ No. 5)	2020	— (Note: "Call" did not enter the Oricon Combined Singles Chart, but peaked at number 38 on the Oricon Streaming Chart.)	92	RIAJ: Platinum (streaming)	Note-book: Me. & Harenchi
"Picky"	2020	—	—		Note-book: U. & Harenchi
"Rainy Friday"	2020	—	—		"Angel"
"Racin’" (AK-69 featuring Chanmina)	2021	—	—		The Race
"Harenchi"	2021	46	37	RIAJ: 3× Platinum (streaming)	Harenchi
"Sun" (太陽, Taiyō)	2021	—	—		Harenchi
"I'm Not OK"	2023	—	—		Naked
"B-List" (B級)	2023	—	69	RIAJ: Platinum (streaming)	Naked
"Sad Song"	2025	8	11	RIAJ: 2× Platinum (streaming)	Never Grow Up
"History"	2026	—	—		Legend
"—" denotes items that did not chart.

==== Other charted or certified songs ====
List of other charted or certified songs, with selected chart positions, certifications and album name
Title	Year	Peak chart positions	Certifications	Album
Title	Year	JPN Hot	Certifications	Album
"Best Boy Friend"	2017	—	RIAJ: Gold (streaming)	Miseinen
"^_^"	2021	92	RIAJ: Gold (streaming)	Harenchi
"Firework" (花火)	2021	—	RIAJ: Platinum (streaming)	Harenchi
"—" denotes releases that did not chart.

=== Guest appearances ===
List of non-single guest appearances with other performing artists
Title	Year	Other artist(s)	Album
"Do U Wanna"	2017	Typewriter, YMG, Lipstorm, Yurika	La La Palooza
"No Thanks Ya"	2017	Miyavi	Samurai Sessions Vol. 2
"You Made Me"	2018	TeddyLoid	Silent Planet: Reloaded
"Best Friend"	2021	Saweetie, Doja Cat, Jamie	Best Friend Remix EP
"Onigiri" (remix)	2025	Thelma Aoyama, Uverworld	Easy Mode
"Baka"	2025	pH-1	What Have We Done
