= Never Grow Up (album) =

2019 studio album by Chanmina

- Digital and limited edition cover

Studio album by Chanmina
- Released: August 7, 2019
- Recorded: 2018–2019
- Length: 42:20
- Language: Japanese; English
- Label: Warner Japan
- Producer: Jigg; Ryosuke "Dr. R" Sakai; Ryuja; Marlon Barrow

Chanmina chronology
Chocolate (2017)	Never Grow Up (2019)	Note-book: Me. Note-book: U. (2020)

Singles from Never Grow Up
- 1. "Doctor" Released: September 28, 2018; 2. "Pain Is Beauty" Released: November 30, 2018; 3. "I'm a Pop" Released: February 27, 2019; 4. "Call" Released: June 28, 2019; 5. "Never Grow Up" Released: July 19, 2019

Never Grow Up is the second studio album by South Korean-Japanese rapper and singer Chanmina, released on August 7, 2019, via Warner Music Japan. Originally inspired when turning 20 years old, Chanmina conceived Never Grow Up as a youthful album that expressed her desire to remain young at heart. Five singles were released from the album, including "Doctor", which garnered international attention, and the title song "Never Grow Up", which was used as the theme song for the Japanese drama Jigoku no Girlfriend.

Initially debuting at number 21 on the Billboard Japan Hot Albums chart, Never Grow Up saw commercial success in 2024 and 2025 following the airing of No No Girls, a survival show that determined the members of Hana, a girl group produced by Chanmina. Charting for 26 non-consecutive weeks, Never Grow Up peaked at number 3 on the Japan Hot Albums chart, becoming her highest charting album on the chart. On the Oricon Albums Chart, Never Grow Up peaked at number 23.

== Background ==
In November 2017, Chanmina released her first extended play, Chocolate, released eight months after the release of her debut album Miseinen. Led by the single of the same name, Chocolate became Chanmina's first top-ten album, peaking at number 10 on the Billboard Japan Hot Albums chart.

In August 2018, Chanmina announced her departure from Victor Entertainment. Signing with Warner Music Japan, she released her first single under the label, "Doctor". Serving as her first worldwide release, the single brought Chanmina international attention.

In June 2019, she announced her second studio album, Never Grow Up.

== Release and promotion ==
Never Grow Up was released on August 7, 2019. The album was her first to be released digitally worldwide. Two variants of Never Grow Up were released: a standard and limited edition. The standard edition contains 13 tracks while the limited edition contains a bonus track, "Sad Song". The limited-edition version of Never Grow Up contains a DVD of live footage from Chanmina's Princess Project 3 tour at Zepp Tokyo.

=== Singles ===
Five singles were issued from Never Grow Up. The lead single "Doctor" was released on September 28, 2018. The second single "Pain Is Beauty", which she first performed during her Princess Project 2 tour, was released on November 30, 2018. In January 2019, she announced her first maxi single, "I'm a Pop", released on February 27, 2019, as the third single. The maxi single included three B-side tracks, including an English version of "Doctor". The fourth single "Call" was released on June 28, 2019, followed by the title song "Never Grow Up" on July 19 as the fifth and final single.

On January 10, 2025, Warner Japan released "Sad Song" as a promotional single. The track was previously unavailable on streaming platforms.

== Track listing ==
Never Grow Up standard track listing
No.	Title	Writer(s)	Producer(s)	Length
1.	"Call"	Mina Otomonai; Jigg	Jigg	3:00
2.	"I'm a Pop"	Otomonai; Ryosuke "Dr. R" Sakai	Sakai	3:10
3.	"Pain Is Beauty"	Otomonai; Ryuja; Yui Mugino	Ryuja	3:55
4.	"Never Grow Up"	Otomonai; Sakai	Sakai	3:16
5.	"Yesterday"	Otomonai; Jigg	Jigg	3:29
6.	"You've Won" (君が勝った)	Otomonai; Jigg	Jigg	3:22
7.	"My Own Lane"	Otomonai; Sara Mitchell; Sakai	Sakai	2:44
8.	"Girls"	Otomonai; Sakai	Sakai	3:15
9.	"Can U Love Me?"	Otomonai; Marlon Barrow	Barrow	3:08
10.	"Like This"	Otomonai; Sakai	Sakai	3:00
11.	"Doctor"	Otomonai; Jigg	Jigg	3:03
12.	"Cafe"	Otomonai; Sakai	Sakai	3:27
13.	"A Song Saved to Archived" (アーカイブに保存した曲)	Otomonai; Sakai	Sakai	3:31
Total length:				42:20

Limited edition bonus track
No.	Title	Writer(s)	Producer(s)	Length
14.	"Sad Song"	Otomonai; Natsuhiko Okamura	Okamura	3:37
Total length:				45:57

Limited edition bonus DVD
No.	Title	Length
1.	"I'm a Pop"
2.	"My Name"
3.	"Chocolate"
4.	"Doctor"
5.	"Never"
6.	"Who Are You"
7.	"Sober"
8.	"Over"

== Charts ==
=== Weekly charts ===
Weekly chart performance for Never Grow Up
Chart (2021–2025)	Peak position
Japanese Albums (Oricon)	23
Japanese Combined Albums (Oricon)	13
Japanese Hot Albums (Billboard Japan)	3

=== Year-end charts ===
Year-end chart performance for Never Grow Up
Chart (2025)	Position
Japanese Hot Albums (Billboard Japan)	15

== Release history ==
Release history and formats for Never Grow Up
Region	Date	Format(s)	Version	Label	Ref.
Various	August 7, 2019	Digital download; streaming	Standard	Warner	
Japan	August 7, 2019	CD	Standard	Warner	
Japan	August 7, 2019	CD; DVD	Limited	Warner	
