= I Wonder (Da-ice song) =

2024 song by Da-iCE

"I wonder" is a Da-iCE song released by avex trax on April 17, 2024. TBS Tuesday drama "Kururi ~ Who fell in love with me? ~" was used for the theme song.

It was selected for the Best Work Award at the "66th Japan Record Awards" in 2024. And it is also a song that achieved its first appearance in the 75th NHK Kōhaku Uta Gassen.

== Release ==
On March 19, 2024, Da-iCE will start broadcasting on April 9, the Tuesday drama "Kururi - Who Fell in Love with Me? It was announced that "I wonder" was written as a new song for the theme song of this drama. The song was released for the first time in the drama trailer video released at the same time.

On April 8, the release of the song on the 17th was announced and the distribution jacket was released. From April 17, the release date, an SNS sharing campaign for songs was held on Apple Music and Spotify.

On May 3, to commemorate the release of the song, "Da-iCE "I wonder" release commemorative special live broadcast @LINE MUSIC" was held on LINE MUSIC from 20:00. In the live broadcast, talks of music production episodes and dance performances are held, and after the end, an open chat was opened where you can talk with the members after.

== Music video ==
On April 17, 2024, the dance performance video of the song was premiered. Only lighting is used for the production, and the video is simple and stylish. Before the release, a listening party was held on the Stationhead app featuring member Kudo [7]. The video will exceed 32 million times by the end of 2024.

On April 24, the dance practice video of the song was released on YouTube. Following the previous work "A2Z", te2ta served as the video creator.

April 29, "CDTV Live! Live! After the performance of the song, the music video premiered. It is a video with the concept of "Waiting for you in any season, any time, any world".

On June 26, all members appeared on the YouTube channel "THE FIRST TAKE" and performed songs. A special arrangement performance without musical instruments was performed with the participation of Nagie Lane of the harmony group for the a cappella, and Daichi, Bayashi, and Kanburi participated in the beatbox.

On December 26, a live video of the song from "Da-iCE 10th Anniversary Live House Tour 2024" held at Toyosu PIT on September 19 of the same year was released.

== Explanation of the song ==
Members Kudo and Hanamura participated in the lyrics and compositions. It is a song that incorporates the two themes of "love" and "search for the true self", which incorporates the setting and elements of the drama, and is drawn with an expression in which various colors are superimposed. The choreograph was produced by members Sota Hanamura and Shungo of avex ROYALBRATS.

When the song was written down and announced, Da-iCE said,

After listening to the drama, I felt that it was a story in which the heroine once again learned that the world is so wonderful, so I made it the title "I wonder" I'm also particular about the phrases that appear in the lyrics, so I think you'll be linked to the song little by little if you watch the drama, so please look forward to it!

== Chart results ==
On the overall chart "Hot 100" compiled by Billboard JAPAN, it first appeared at No. 68 on the public chart on May 1. After that, he continued to improve his performance and entered the TOP 10 on the July 3rd public chart, which was the 10th round of the chart. On the 17th of the same month, it recorded the highest 7th place on the public chart.

On the streaming chart "Streaming Songs", it first appeared at No. 67 on the public chart on May 8, 2024. On the public chart on May 15 of the following week, the number of views increased sharply to 142.2% compared to the previous week, jumping to 36th place. After that, the ranking increased every week, and on the July 17th public chart, it was viewed 7.18 million times, ranking 4th, the highest ranking. From the public chart on June 12, it has been in the top 10 for 11 consecutive weeks.

On the download chart "Download Songs", it first appeared at No. 15 on the public chart on April 24. On June 26, it sold 3930DL on the public chart and ranked 5th, the highest ranking.

On June 27, 2024, the song surpassed 600 million views on TikTok.

On September 6, the cumulative number of streaming views exceeded 100 million on the Billboard JAPAN chart released on the same day. It is his third record after "CITRUS" and "Starmine", and it is his fastest record of 100 million times.

On January 14, 2025, it was announced that the cumulative number of streaming views worldwide exceeded 200 million.
