= Naked (Chanmina album) =

Studio album by Chanmina
- Released: April 26, 2023
- Length: 49:47
- Language: Japanese; Korean; English
- Label: No Label; Warner
- Producer: Jigg; Gray; Fiction; Ryosuke "Dr. R" Sakai; Brian Lee; James Chul Rim; Gazzo; Oak Felder; Sam Hollander

Chanmina chronology
Harenchi (2021)	Naked (2023)	Area of Diamond (2023)

Singles from Naked
- 1. "Tokyo 4AM" Released: September 2, 2022; 2. "Don't Go" Released: September 23, 2022; 3. "Mirror" Released: October 28, 2022; 4. "You Just Walked in My Life" Released: March 8, 2023

Naked is the fourth studio album by South Korean-Japanese rapper and singer Chanmina, released on April 26, 2023, by No Label Music and Warner Music Japan. The album served as Chanmina's first trilingual release, with songs in Japanese, English and Korean. Production of the album was by Japanese, Korean and American producers, including Brian Lee, Oak Felder and Ryosuke "Dr. R" Sakai.

Four singles were released from Naked. The first single, "Tokyo 4AM", served as the theme song for the Japanese drama -50kg no Cinderella. "Don't Go" featuring Ash Island served as the second single and as Chanmina's first Korean single. "Mirror", which served as the third single also was recorded in Korean. The fourth single, "You Just Walked in My Life" was released with no prior announcement in celebration of Chanmina's debut anniversary.

== Background ==
Following the release of Harenchi in 2021, Warner Music announced Chanmina would release songs recorded entirely in Korean. In August 2022, Warner announced Chanmina recorded a song for the Japanese drama -50kg no Cinderella, titled "Tokyo 4AM". The song, recorded in Japanese and English, was released digitally in September. Shortly after the release of "Tokyo 4AM", Chanmina revealed her first Korean song would be released digitally at the end of September, titled "Don't Go" featuring Ash Island. In October, Chanmina released her second Korean single, "Mirror". In March 2023, Chanmina surprise released a new song "You Just Walked in My Life". The single was released in celebration of Chanmina's debut anniversary. Near the end of March, Chanmina announced she established No Label Music, a record label within Warner Music Japan. Her fourth studio album was revealed alongside its track listing. A remix of "Bijin" featuring Awich was released as a promotional single. In April, Chanmina released a live video performing an unreleased song, "I'm Not OK". The song was later released as a promotional single to digital stores.

== Release and promotion ==
Naked was released on April 26, 2023. Alongside the standard edition of the album, a limited edition was also released in Japan containing a 38-page lyrics card and artwork in a slipcase and transparent zip case. First press editions of the album included a sticker logo of the album title.

On the same day of the album's release, a lyric video animated by Ran for "Sunflower" was released to YouTube. A listening party held by Chanmina on YouTube was announced the same day additionally.

== Track listing ==
Naked track listing
No.	Title	Writer(s)	Length
1.	"Good"	Mina Otomonai; Aston Fenly; Jigg	3:33
2.	"Red"	Otomonai; Gray	2:42
3.	"444"	Otomonai	1:51
4.	"Wake Up Call"	Otomonai; Joo Yoon-jung; Raudi; Richboy Hardy	2:03
5.	"Don't Go" (featuring Ash Island)	Otomonai; Yoon Jin-young; Adam Kapit; Fiction	2:38
6.	"Sunflower" (サンフラワー)	Otomonai; Ryosuke "Dr. R" Sakai	3:19
7.	"You Just Walked in My Life"	Otomonai; Jigg	2:59
8.	"Naked Now"	Otomonai; Maty Noyes; Taylor Hill; Tommy Brown	2:25
9.	"Mirror"	Otomonai; Brian Lee; James Chul Rim; Mitchy Collins	3:34
10.	"Fuck Love"	Otomonai; Sakai	2:49
11.	"Miso Soup"	Otomonai; Aimée Proal; Grant Michaels; Sam Hollander	2:33
12.	"B-list" (B級, B-kyū)	Otomonai; Sakai	3:17
13.	"Heard You're Trash Now" (クズになったらしいじゃん, Kuzu ni Nattarashījan)	Otomonai; Sakai	3:39
14.	"Bijin (Remix)" (美人) (featuring Awich)	Otomonai; Sakai; Akiko Urasaki	2:40
15.	"Tokyo 4AM"	Otomonai; Kella Armitage; Michael Gazzo; Riley Biederer	3:21
16.	"Love Face"	Otomonai; Proal; Michaels; Hollander	3:45
17.	"I'm Not OK"	Otomonai; Alex Vincent Niceforo; Sebastian Kole; Keith Sorrells; Oak Felder	2:39
Total length:			49:47

== Charts ==
=== Weekly charts ===
Weekly chart performance for Naked
Chart (2023–2025)	Peak position
Japanese Albums (Oricon)	16
Japanese Combined Albums (Oricon)	12
Japanese Hot Albums (Billboard Japan)	11

=== Year-end charts ===
Year-end chart performance for Naked
Chart (2025)	Position
Japanese Hot Albums (Billboard Japan)	59

== Release history ==
Release history and formats for Naked
Region	Date	Format(s)	Version	Label	Ref.
Various	April 26, 2023	Digital download; streaming	Standard	No Label; Warner	
Japan	April 26, 2023	CD	Standard	No Label; Warner	
Japan	April 26, 2023	CD	Limited	No Label; Warner	
