= Bullet/Bullet =

2025 Japanese anime television series

- Promotional poster

バレット/バレット (Baretto/Baretto)
- Genre: Action; Adventure; Post-apocalyptic
- Created by: Sunghoo Park (concept); E&H Production/Gaga (story)
- Original net animation
- Directed by: Sunghoo Park
- Produced by: Masahiro Saito
- Written by: Aki Kindaichi
- Music by: Hiroaki Tsutsumi
- Studio: E&H Production
- Licensed by: Disney Platform Distribution
- Released: July 16, 2025 – August 13, 2025
- Runtime: 25 minutes
- Episodes: 12

Bullet/Bullet (バレット/バレット, Baretto/Baretto), stylized as BULLET/BULLET, is a Japanese original net animation (ONA) series. Created and directed by Sunghoo Park, animated by E&H Production and produced by Gaga, the series was released from July to August 2025.

== Premise ==
Set in a wasteland like future, the series centers on a boy named Gear, a gambler named White Bear, and a robot named Qu-0213 who run a small business where they return stolen items. When a girl named Noah comes to them with a request to steal something for her, Gear and his friends find themselves caught in a world changing situation.

== Characters ==
Gear (ギア, Gia)
Voiced by: Marina Inoue (Japanese); Caitlyn Elizabeth (English)
White Bear (シロクマ, Shirokuma)
Voiced by: Kazuhiro Yamaji (Japanese); Peter Giles (English)
Nosa (ノサ姉, Nosa-ane)
Voiced by: Rie Kugimiya (Japanese); Ceara Morgana (English)
Kau (カウ姉, Kau-ane)
Voiced by: Kana Hanazawa (Japanese); Jesse Vilinsky (English)
Naka (ナカ兄, Naka-ani)
Voiced by: Tomokazu Seki (Japanese); Blythe Melin (English)
Ay (エイ婆, Ei-baba)
Voiced by: Ai Orikasa (Japanese); Mary O'Brady (English)
Noah (ノア, Noa)
Voiced by: Asami Seto (Japanese); Amanda Turen (English)
Damper (ダンパー, Danpā)
Voiced by: Atsushi Ono (Japanese); David St. Louis (English)
Barrel (バレル, Bareru)
Voiced by: Makoto Furukawa (Japanese); Liam O'Brien (English)
Will (ウィール, Uīru)
Voiced by: Takamasa Mogi (Japanese); Jonathan Bullock (English)
Lynn (リン, Rin)
Voiced by: Yuki Wakai (Japanese); Corey Pettit (English)
Breakfast (ブレックファースト, Burekkufāsuto)
Voiced by: Yoshihisa Kawahara (Japanese); Crispin Freeman (English)
Afternoon Tea (アフタヌーンティー, Afutanūntī)
Voiced by: Ai Kakuma (Japanese); Christina Assaf-Costello (English)
Lunch (ランチ, Ranchi)
Voiced by: Nao Tamura (Japanese); Monique Shi (English)
Brunch (ブランチ, Buranchi)
Voiced by: Mayumi Shintani (Japanese); Marin Miller (English)
Dinner (ディナー, Dinā)
Voiced by: Ai Orikasa (Japanese); Stephanie Sheh (English)
Sushimaru Tempura (天麩羅寿司丸, Tempura Sushimaru)
Voiced by: Shinichiro Kamio (Japanese); Christopher Sabat (English)
Destro Dog (デストロ犬, Desutoro Inu)
Voiced by: Hironori Kondo (Japanese); Michael Sinterniklaas (English)
Batting Center Saito (バッティングセンター斎藤, Battingusentā Saitō)
Voiced by: Yuichi Nakamura (Japanese); Gary Littman (English)
Yamada Country Club (山田カントリークラブ, Yamada Kantorīkurabu)
Voiced by: Hidetaka Tenjin (Japanese); Robb Moreira (English)
Crying Man (泣き男, Nakiotoko)
Voiced by: Daiki Yamashita (Japanese); Michael Sinterniklaas (English)
Slaughterhouse Emma (食肉センター・エマ, Shokuniku Sentā Ema)
Voiced by: Saya Aizawa (Japanese); Rebecca Soler (English)
Martial Idol Ai (闇カワ武闘派アイドル・アイ, Kuragawa Budōha Aidoru Ai)
Voiced by: Yuka Iwahashi (Japanese); Stephanie Sheh (English)
Big Sister Fighting Mari (戦うお姉ちゃん・マリ, Tatakau Onee-chan Mari)
Voiced by: Akiha Matsui (Japanese); Stephanie Sheh (English)
Death Nail Naomi Brilliant (デスネイル・ナオミ・ブリリアント, Desuneiru Naomi Buririanto)
Voiced by: Haruna Himeno (Japanese); Anairis Quiñones (English)
SSS
Voiced by: Jōichirō Ohtsuki (Japanese); Mike Pollock (English)
Silent Killer Lisa (サイレントキラー・リサ, Sairentokirā Risa)
Voiced by: Marie Ōi (Japanese); Anairis Quiñones (English)
Tsuyako (つや子)
Voiced by: Marie Ōi (Japanese); Anairis Quiñones (English)
Professor Chin (チン教授, Chin Kyōju)
Voiced by: Yūgo Sekiguchi (Japanese); Bill Lobley (English)

== Production and release ==
Sunghoo Park spent a decade drafting the story. The series was directed by Park and animated by his studio E&H Production and produced by Gaga. Aki Kindaichi wrote the scripts, with Takahiro Yoshimatsu designing the characters, Hidetaka Tenjin serving as the concept designer and mechanical designer, and Shin Misawa serving as the car action director. The opening theme song is "Work Hard" performed by Chanmina, while the ending theme song is "Glass Door" performed by Newspeak.

The first eight episodes of the series were released on July 16, 2025, while the remaining episodes were released on August 13. Disney+ is streaming it worldwide, while Hulu is streaming it in the United States.

=== Episodes ===
| No. | Title | Directed by (Note: Information is taken from the ending credits of each episode.) | Written by | Storyboarded by | Original release date |
|---|---|---|---|---|---|
| 1 | "Beyond the Horizon"; Transliteration: "Ano Chiheisen no Mukō Made" (Japanese: あの地平線の向こうまで) | Sunghoo Park | Aki Kindaichi | Sunghoo Park | July 16, 2025 |
| 2 | "You Decided to Do It"; Transliteration: "Temee de Yarutte Kimetandarō ga" (Japanese: てめぇでやるって決めたんだろうが) | Takayuki Sano | Aki Kindaichi | Takayuki Sano | July 16, 2025 |
| 3 | "I Learned Not to Trust People"; Transliteration: "Ore wa Mananda no sa, Hito o Shinjiru Natte" (Japanese: 俺は学んだのさ, 人を信じるなって) | Sunghoo Park | Kazuhiko Inukai | Sunghoo Park | July 16, 2025 |
| 4 | "We Are Your Family"; Transliteration: "Watashitachi wa, Kazoku Nandakara" (Japanese: 私たちは, 家族なんだから) | Yui Miura | Shigeru Murakoshi | Yui Miura | July 16, 2025 |
| 5 | "You Fool"; Transliteration: "......Baka ne" (Japanese: ......バカね) | Sunghoo Park | Michiko Yokote | Sunghoo Park | July 16, 2025 |
| 6 | "You Have the Right to Know"; Transliteration: "Anata-tachi ni wa Shirukenri ga Aru" (Japanese: 貴方たちには知る権利がある) | Yui Miura | Aki Kindaichi | Yui Miura | July 16, 2025 |
| 7 | "Time to Get to Work"; Transliteration: "Shigoto no Jikan Da" (Japanese: 仕事の時間だ) | Sunghoo Park | Kazuhiko Inukai | Sunghoo Park | July 16, 2025 |
| 8 | "The World Is Much Bigger, Tougher, and Uglier"; Transliteration: "Sekai wa, Haruka ni Ōkiku, Tsuyoku, Minikui" (Japanese: 世界は, 遥かに大きく, 強く, 醜い) | Yann Le Gall, Yui Miura, & Hisatoshi Shimizu | Shigeru Murakoshi | Yann Le Gall | July 16, 2025 |
| 9 | "That Guy Is Like Spinach Stuck in Your Teeth"; Transliteration: "Soitsu wa Ha ni Hasamatta Hōrensō" (Japanese: そいつは歯に挟まったほうれん草) | Sunghoo Park | Michiko Yokote | Sunghoo Park | August 13, 2025 |
| 10 | "I Have Discovered a Way Only I Can Change the World"; Transliteration: "Wakatta no Watashi dake ga Dekiru Sekai no Kaekata ga" (Japanese: わかったの。私だけができる世界の変え方が) | Gota Yoshimoto | Kazuhiko Inukai | Gota Yoshimoto | August 13, 2025 |
| 11 | "Do Not Stop Moving Forward"; Transliteration: "Anta ni wa Tomatte Hoshikunai nda" (Japanese: アンタには止まってほしくないんだ) | Gota Yoshimoto & Tetsuro Moronuki | Aki Kindaichi | Sunghoo Park | August 13, 2025 |
| 12 | "Bullet/Bullet"; Transliteration: "Baretto/Baretto" (Japanese: バレット/バレット) | Sunghoo Park | Aki Kindaichi | Sunghoo Park | August 13, 2025 |
