= No Label Music =

Japanese record label

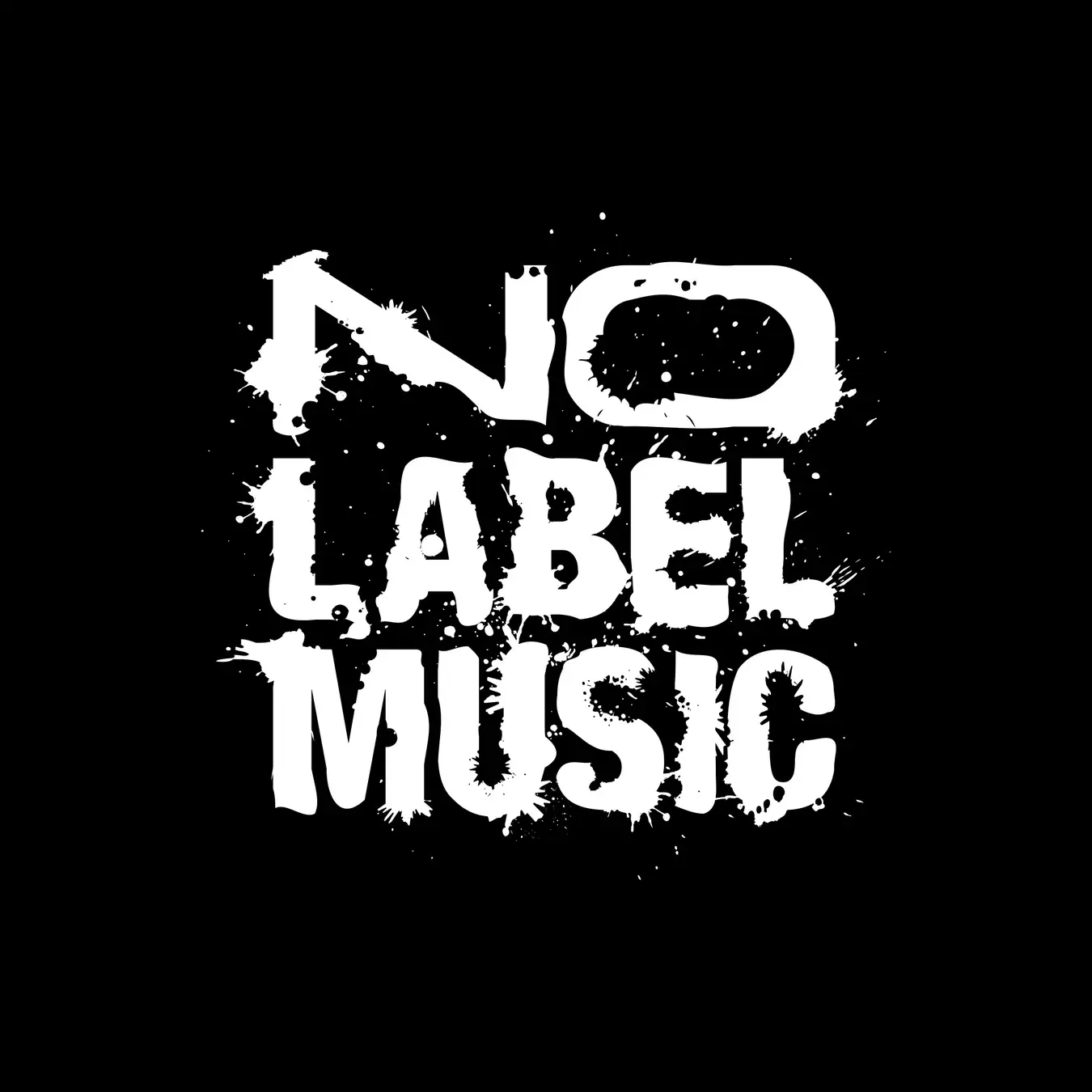
- Parent company: Warner Music Japan (2023–2025); Sony Music Labels (2025–present)
- Founded: 2023; 3 years ago
- Founder: Chanmina
- Distributor: Sony Music Solutions
- Genre: J-pop; hip-hop
- Country of origin: Japan
- Location: Chiyoda, Tokyo

No Label Music is a Japanese record label founded in 2023 by Chanmina. It currently operates under Sony Music Labels, a subsidiary of Sony Music Entertainment Japan.

== History ==
In March 2023, Chanmina announced her fourth studio album, Naked (2023). Alongside the album announcement, she revealed it would be released under her new vanity label, No Label Music, operating under Warner Music Japan. The label later officially launched on April 2, 2023.

In April 2025, exactly two years after the formation of No Label Music, Chanmina announced her departure from Warner, signing a record deal with Sony Music Labels. As part of her record deal, Chanmina relaunched No Label Music under Sony Music Labels. The record label later signed Japanese girl group Hana, who are produced by Chanmina. Hana's debut single "Rose" served as the label's first following its relaunch under Sony.

On January 1, 2026, No Label Music updated their branding. The label later announced the launch of No Label Artists, an independent label housing self-produced artists. On January 4, the label begun teasing the signing of its first artist under No Label Artists on social media. On January 8, No Label Artists announced their first signed artist, Fumino, a finalist from the audition program No No Girls that determined the members of Hana.

== Artists ==
=== No Label Music ===
- Chanmina (2023–present)
- Hana (2025–present)

=== No Label Artists ===
- Fumino (2026–present)
- Takara (2026–present)

== Discography ==
- Chanmina – Naked (2023)
- Chanmina – Area of Diamond (2023)
- Chanmina – Area of Diamond 2 (2025)
- Chanmina – Area of Diamond 3 (2025)
- Hana – Hana (2026)
- Chanmina – Legend (2026)
