= Boku ga Shinou to Omotta no Wa =

2013 single by Mika Nakashima

"「僕が死のうと思ったのは」"

Single by Mika Nakashima

from the album Tough
- Language: Japanese
- English title: The Reason Why I Thought I'd Die
- B-side: "Today"
- Released: August 28, 2013
- Genre: J-pop; Rock
- Length: 6:02
- Label: Sony Music Associated Records
- Songwriter: Hiroshi Akita (amazarashi)
- Composer: Yoshiaki Dewa

Mika Nakashima singles chronology
"Ai Kotoba" (2013)	"「僕が死のうと思ったのは」" (2013)	"Fighter/Gift" (2014)

Boku ga Shinou to Omotta no Wa (original title in Japanese: 僕が死のうと思ったのは, English: The Reason Why I Thought I'd Die) is the 38th single by Japanese singer Mika Nakashima, released on 28 August 2013 by Sony Music Associated Records. The song was written and composed by Hiroshi Akita, a member of the Japanese band amazarashi, and arranged by Yoshiaki Dewa. Its creative theme was "in order to depict an intense hope, one must first depict a deep darkness", expressing how, after passing through much heaviness and negativity, one ultimately arrives at brightness and anticipation.

The song received positive reviews from music critics upon release, with praise for Nakashima's impressive vocal delivery and the song's solemn, prayer-like quality. Prior to its release, it topped the cable radio J-pop song request chart, and debuted at number 17 on the Oricon singles chart in its first week, going on to accumulate total sales of 10,425 copies—setting a new record low in single sales for Nakashima at the time.

The music video for Boku ga Shinou to Omottanowa was filmed by Shuichi Tan, employing special filming techniques including 3D scanning, and incorporating illustrations by artist YKBX. The video merges the real-world Nakashima with a fictional girl from a virtual world.

After its release, Nakashima performed the song numerous times at personal concerts and music festivals, and in 2021 and 2025 appeared on the YouTube channel The First Take and the South Korean television programme Japan-Korea Top 10 Show to perform it. Various artists, including Chinese actress Tang Wei, South Korean male singer Kim Jae-joong, and Taiwanese male singer Ardor Huang, have also recorded cover versions of the song.

== Background ==
"Initially, the plan was to use an upbeat song for this single. Although that had been the direction we were heading in, the moment I heard this song from amazarashi, all of those plans vanished into thin air."

— Nakashima on hearing the demo of Boku ga Shinou to Omottanowa

In January 2013, Nakashima released Real, her first album since returning to the music scene, and subsequently embarked on a nationwide concert tour themed around the album, LIVE IS 'REAL' 2013～THE LETTER～. During that period, she collaborated with singer-songwriter Miyuki Nakajima, performing a song written especially for her titled Ai Kotoba, which was released as her first single of 2013.

Nakashima also proactively approached the rock band amazarashi with a request for collaboration, hoping the band would write her an upbeat song. However, band vocalist Hiroshi Akita played Nakashima an unreleased demo and felt the song would surely suit her. Nakashima, moved to tears by the song, recognised it as an exceptional work and steeled herself to perform it while weeping. Her staff shared her feelings and decided to abandon the original creative direction, adopting the song directly.

After deciding to perform the song, Nakashima initially considered changing the title to something more positive and proposed several alternatives; however, her staff felt there was no need to change it. Having heard their opinion, Nakashima dropped her original idea and decided to keep the song's original title, Boku ga Shinou to Omottanowa.

== Music and lyrics ==
Boku ga Shinou to Omottanowa was written by amazarashi lead vocalist Hiroshi Akita and arranged by Yoshiaki Dewa. It is a mid-tempo rock ballad with a duration of 6 minutes and 22 seconds. The song is composed in A-flat major at a tempo of 168 beats per minute. Its creative theme is "in order to depict an intense hope, one must first depict a deep darkness": even amidst an ordinary daily life full of invisible helplessness and sorrow, a redemptive light shines in the hope of living on together with a deeply loved one, and one still holds anticipation for the world. In keeping with the themes of other amazarashi compositions, the song depicts how, after passing through much heaviness and negativity, one ultimately arrives at brightness and anticipation.

Billboard Japan's Tetsuo Hiraga described the song as "not a song for people who want to die, but a song praying that deeply loved ones will not take their own lives, a song expressing the wish that they will not cease to exist". An editor at CD Journal described it as "a rock ballad depicting a ray of light seen from within despair".

== Release ==
Boku ga Shinou to Omottanowa was released in Japan on 28 August 2013 as a CD single in two editions: a "first press limited edition" and a "regular edition". Both editions include four tracks on CD; the B-side "Today" was also written by Akita and is a brisk rock track whose popular band sound and Nakashima's relaxed vocals contrast with the solemnity of the A-side. The single also includes a new version of the 2005 song Sakurairo Mau Koro (natural edition), produced as an advertising song for Japan Post Insurance, while the first press limited edition comes with a DVD containing the music video for Boku ga Shinou to Omottanowa. The single was simultaneously made available on digital platforms, while the title track was made available for mobile ringtone download on 14 August, ahead of the full release. The Taiwan edition of Boku ga Shinou to Omottanowa was released on 30 August by Sony Music Taiwan, with the same contents as the Japanese first press limited edition. Sony Music Korea released the Korean edition on 12 September of the same year, with the same contents as the Japanese regular edition. On 22 December 2021, the audio from Nakashima's performance on The First Take was made available on digital platforms.

== Critical reception ==
Boku ga Shinou to Omottanowa received positive reviews from music critics upon its release. An editor at CD Journal praised Nakashima's impressive vocal approach throughout the song, noting that it marked a new artistic milestone for her as a singer. Billboard Japan's Tetsuo Hiraga felt that Nakashima had herself once considered ending it all, just as the song's title suggests, and that this was why she was able to throw herself into it so completely. He also praised the song as the ultimate love song and noted that he had been moved to tears listening to it on his way home from work at night.

Aki Ito of EMTG Music described the collaboration between Nakashima and amazarashi as a meeting of shadow and shadow, with the "shadow" within the song existing to render a dazzling light all the more vivid. She also praised Nakashima's vocals as more radiant than in her previous love songs, a quality that lent the track added authenticity. An editor at MANTANWEB praised the song for the intimacy and warmth that felt as though Nakashima were right beside the listener, illuminating the song's world with a gentle light and possessing a solemnity akin to prayer.

== Commercial performance ==
On the Oricon charts, Boku ga Shinou to Omottanowa debuted at number 17 on the singles chart in its first week, matching the chart position of its predecessor Ai Kotoba. This made it Nakashima's lowest-charting single at the time, aside from Sunao na Mama (number 18), which had been released on the same day as the album YES. The song accumulated total sales of 10,425 copies and remained on the chart for seven weeks. The song set a new record low in single sales for Nakashima at the time, a record that stood until it was broken by the following year's Hanataba.

On Billboard Japan, the song debuted at number 50 on the Japan Hot 100 in its first week and dropped to number 75 the following week. The song also debuted at number 13 on the top single sales chart in its first week. It fell to number 50 the following week and to number 81 in its third week. Prior to its release, the song topped the cable radio J-pop song request chart, making it Nakashima's second consecutive chart-topper following Ai Kotoba.

== Music video ==
The music video for Boku ga Shinou to Omottanowa was filmed by Shuichi Tan, who had previously filmed music videos for Nakashima's One Survive and Hitori, among others. Filming took place on the riverbed of the Tama River in early July 2013, and no indoor shooting was conducted to authentically convey the inner darkness described in the lyrics. The video's theme is the inability to look ordinarily upon everyday scenery—"sky, clouds, and wind"—as a means of expressing inner pain.

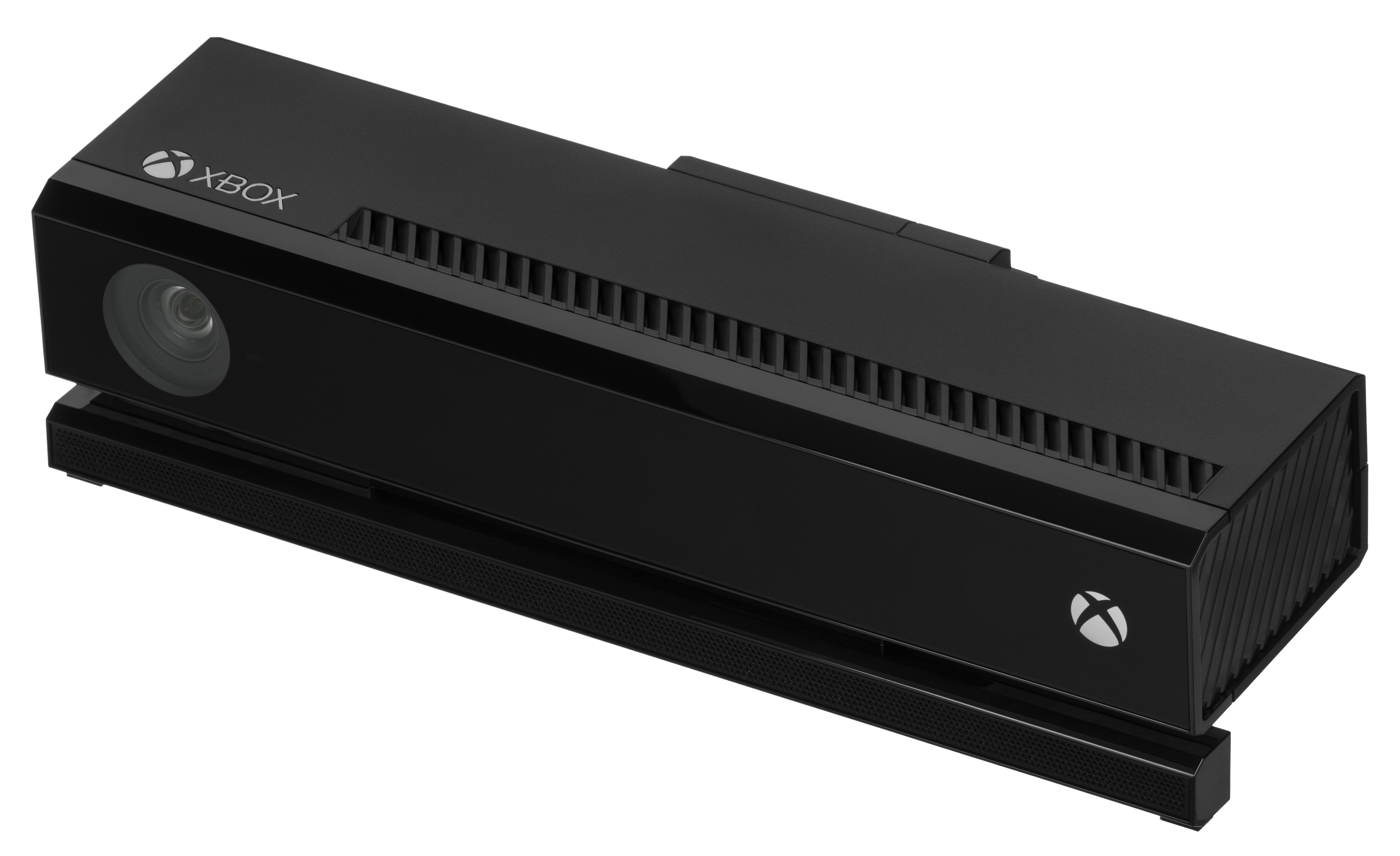
The music video for Boku ga Shinou to Omottanowa employed infrared positional sensing technology used in Kinect (pictured)

The video employed infrared positional sensing technology used in Kinect, rendering Nakashima and the background in three dimensions under specialised sensors and merging mechanical computer graphics with live-action footage. The video also made use of 3D scanning techniques, with markers placed on Nakashima's face every three centimetres to capture the effect of her facial features floating. Illustrations by YKBX—an artist who had previously worked on the visual design of Hatsune Miku—were also incorporated, adding the girl character also seen on the single's cover art and merging the real-world Nakashima with a fictional girl from a virtual world.

The complete music video was made available on Nakashima's official website on 5 August for a 48-hour limited streaming period. The complete video was later included on the DVD bundled with the single's first press limited edition and in the music video compilation Film Lotus IX. A short version of the music video was also made publicly available on Nakashima's official YouTube channel; as of March 2025 it has surpassed 5.4 million views.

== Live performances ==
Boku ga Shinou to Omottanowa has become one of the songs Nakashima performs regularly at live events. From the year of its release through to 2025, she has performed the song at personal concerts and music festivals every year, with the sole exception of 2020. In November 2021, Nakashima appeared on the YouTube channel The First Take to perform Boku ga Shinou to Omottanowa, marking the first time she had performed the song outside a concert setting. Nakashima subsequently included the song as a bonus track on her cover album MESSAGE ～Piano & Voice～, released later that year. In 2025, she performed Boku ga Shinou to Omottanowa on the South Korean MBC television programme Japan-Korea Top 10 Show, broadcast on 6 January, marking the first time she had performed the song on a television programme.

== Cover versions ==
The rock band amazarashi, to which songwriter Hiroshi Akita belongs, recorded a self-cover of the song in an acoustic style in 2016, included on the Mika Nakashima tribute album Mika Nakashima Tribute. The band also recorded a new arrangement of the song for their mini-album Kymbyō the same year. Chinese actress Tang Wei also covered the song the same year; the Chinese-language version, titled Wǒ céngjīng yě xiǎngguò yīliǎobǎiliǎo (我曾经也想过一了百了), served as the theme song for the film Finding Mr. Right 2 in which she starred.

In 2018, South Korean singer Kim Jae-joong performed a cover of Boku ga Shinou to Omottanowa at his personal concert "The Reunion in Memory", held at Yokohama Arena in Japan, having selected it from a fan request list, and used it to express his gratitude to his fans. Nakashima also re-recorded the song in an acoustic style the same year, including it on her self-cover album PORTRAIT～Piano & Voice～. Taiwanese singer Ardor Huang also covered the song the same year with adapted lyrics in Taiwanese Hokkien, including it on his album Warming a Pot of Youth to Drink (温一壶青春下酒). In December 2021, Lee Chang-sub of South Korean boy group BtoB covered the song as part of the project "Becoming Your Melody".

== Track listing ==
- CD single, digital download, streaming
1. "Boku ga Shinou to Omottanowa" – 6:22
2. "Today" – 5:31
3. "Yuki no Hana" (natural edition) – 4:50
4. "Boku ga Shinou to Omottanowa" (Instrumental) – 6:20
- CD+DVD single
1. "Boku ga Shinou to Omottanowa" – 6:22
2. "Today" – 5:31
3. "Yuki no Hana" (natural edition) – 4:50
4. "Boku ga Shinou to Omottanowa" (Instrumental) – 6:20
5. "Boku ga Shinou to Omottanowa" (Music Video) – 6:22
- Digital download / streaming – The First Take version
1. "Boku ga Shinou to Omottanowa" – From THE FIRST TAKE – 6:50

== Personnel ==
Credits adapted from the Boku ga Shinou to Omottanowa liner notes.

"Boku ga Shinou to Omottanowa"

- Mika Nakashima – lead vocals
- Hiroshi Akita – composition, lyrics
- Yoshiaki Dewa – sound production, arrangement, all accompaniment, programming
- KAZCO – backing vocals
- Atsushi Fujita, Eisuke Kumon – recording
- Yoshiaki Onishi – mixing
- Hidekazu Sakai – mastering

"Today"

- Mika Nakashima – lead vocals
- Hiroshi Akita – composition, lyrics
- Yoshiaki Dewa – sound production, arrangement, all accompaniment, programming
- Aiko Haino – backing vocals
- Atsushi Fujita – recording
- Yoshiaki Onishi – mixing
- Hidekazu Sakai – mastering

== Chart performance ==
Weekly chart (2013)	Peak position
Japan (Oricon Singles Chart)	17
Japan (Billboard Japan Japan Hot 100)	50
Japan (Billboard Japan Top Single Sales)	13
Japan (Cable Radio J-pop Song Request Chart)	1
