= Amazarashi =

Japanese rock band

amazarashi
- Also known as: STAR ISSUE; あまざらし
- Origin: Mutsu, Aomori, Japan
- Genres: Alternative rock; indie folk; rap rock
- Years active: 2007–present
- Labels: Rainbow; Sony
- Members: Hiromu Akita; Manami Toyokawa
- Website: amazarashi.com

Amazarashi (stylized as amazarashi) is a Japanese rock band from Aomori, currently signed to Sony Music Japan. Formed in 2007, its members are Hiromu Akita (lead vocals, guitar, songwriter) and Manami Toyokawa (keyboard). They have released six singles which have all reached the top 20 of the Oricon charts.

Some of the group's most notable songs are "Sora ni Utaeba", the third opening of My Hero Academia, "Speed to Masatsu", the opening theme for the anime Rampo Kitan: Game of Laplace, "Kisetsu wa Tsugitsugi Shindeiku", the ending theme for Tokyo Ghoul √A, "Sayonara Gokko", the first ending theme for the 2019 anime Dororo, and Kyōkaisen, the second opening theme for the 2021 anime Eighty-Six.

== Biography ==
=== 2007–2009: Star Issue and あまざらし era ===
2007

- In January 2007, Star Issue was formed. The band's name was inspired by "a desire to transmit songs that have a ray of hope, just like periodic magazines and newspapers".
- On January 26, an event for amateur bands was held in Aomori, called "Glucon Vol. 17: Aomori ~JOKER STYLE SUMMIT~" , all under Roland Corporation. Star Issue was the winner band.

After this point, the band would call themselves amazarashi, written in hiragana as あまざらし. In 2008, the band entered the Rainbow Entertainment Label (a subsidiary of A&R) to promote the band. They let their songs play in the background of local radio programs, in order to get attention from the label and form a contract.

Around the time of debut, Akita was not being very social, and had the intention of displaying a very linguistic world view; he expressed his world view through words without publicly showing his face. The CD jacket was designed around this concept, with poetry enclosed in the package. The promotion around the CD was based on the internet, and the band began real activities.

2009

- On February 18, 2009, the EP Hikari, Saikō (光、再考, Light, Reconsidered) was released exclusively within the Aomori prefecture, marking the band's indie debut.
- On June 24, an album inspired by the movie Kani Kōsen, titled Counterattack: Kani Kōsen Movie Inspire Album (反撃。〜映画「蟹工船」インスパイア・アルバム〜), in which the band was featured with the song "Yami no Naka: Yukite Kaheranu" (闇の中 〜ゆきてかへらぬ〜; In The Darkness: I Will Not Hesitate).
- On December 9, the band released the EP 0., with only 500 copies of the CD being released in Aomori. At this time, the digital artist YKBX (Masaki Yokobe, also known as Yokoboxxx) became the band's art director, designing the visual mascot for the release. The character, amazarashi-kun, was based on a teru teru bōzu, a spirit believed to bring rain and a good harvest.

=== 2010–2011: From 0.6 to Sennen Kōfukuron ===
2010

- On February 10, 2010, the band changed its name from あまざらし to amazarashi, and the album 0. was re-released as 0.6 with a bonus remix of "Hikari, Saikou" as an extra track.
- On April 29, they moved to the Sony Music Associated Records label, the same label as Ling Tosite Sigure, and on June 9 the band released the EP How to Make a Bomb (爆弾の作り方, Bakudan no Tsukurikata) as their major label debut.
- On November 24, they released the EP Wan Rūmu Jojishi (ワンルーム叙事詩, One-Room Epic).

2011

- On January 8, 2011, it was announced that the theme song for the TBS drama show Heaven's Flower The Legend Of Arcana (ヘブンズ・フラワー The Legend of ARCANA) was going to be a song titled Anomie (アノミー) by the band. On March 16 of the same year, the band released the EP of the same title, Anomie.
- On January 18, the band participated on a compilation album, distributed by Crown Tokuma, titled 36.5°C with the song "Mudai" (無題; Untitled).
- On June 17, the band performed their first official live, amazarashi 1st live: Kono Machi de Ikiteiru (amazarashi 1st live この街で生きている, "I'm Living in this City"), held at Shibuya WWW. According to Akita, in order to transmit the message of the songs properly, they performed behind a screen which images and the song lyrics were projected on to. This was done such in a way such that the crowd wouldn't be able to see their bodies. The band has kept the same performance style since.
- On November 16, the album Sennen Kōfukuron (千年幸福論, A Millenarian Happiness Theorem) was released.

=== 2012: Love Song ===
- On January 28 they performed a one-band live at the Shibuya Public Hall.
- On March 11, as a tribute to the victims of the Tohoku Earthquake that happened the previous year, they released the song "Inori" (祈り; Prayer), based on a poem of the same name which was released by the band immediately after the event, and a site dedicated to the song and event.
- On March 13 the EP Love Song (ラブソング) was released.
- On March 16, the band announced that they would go on a tour titled Gomennasai, Chanto Ieru kana (ごめんなさい、ちゃんといえるかな, I'm sorry, Can I Say it Properly?) from June 30 to July 8.
- On November 14, the band aired the mobile site "APOLOGIES", in which fans could see posts from Akita's blog along with other exclusive content.
- On November 28, the band released a DVD recorded during the Zepp DiverCity performance of the live tour "Gomennasai, Chanto Ieru kana" titled 0.7.
- On November 30, the band held their second one-band live at the Shibuya Public Hall. The band titled the show "Amazarashi Live 0.7". The band adopted a surround-sound system and installed a speaker outside the venue before conducting their performance.
- On December 3, Akita started his own column for the culture site Katayabu Riina, called Gēmu, Saikō (ゲーム、再考, "Game, Reconsidered"; a reference to the song "Hikari, Saikō").

=== 2013–2014: From Nē Mama Anata no Iutōri to Yūhi Shinkō Higashizumu ===
2013

- On April 10 of 2013 the band released their 5th post-debut EP, titled Nē Mama Anata no Iutōri (ねえママ あなたの言うとおり, Hey Mom, It's Just as You Said). The single Juvenile (ジュブナイル) from the EP was pre-sold on the iTunes Store and Recochoku.
- From May 31 to June 9, the band went on a tour titled amazarashi TOUR 2013: Nē Mama Anata no Iutōri.
- On August 16 the band participated in the "RISING SUN ROCK FESTIVAL 2013 in EZO", the first festival they've participated in since changing their name.
- On August 28 Mika Nakashima's single Boku ga Shinō to Omotta no wa, composed and written by Hiromu Akita was released. Akita received the proposal from Nakashima herself, and accepted it.
- On September 30 the band performed at LIQUIDROOM ebisu, along with the frontman from Ling Tosite Sigure, Toru Kitajima.
- On November 21 the band released their 6th post-debut EP, titled Anta e (あんたへ, For You).

2014

- On January 6, 2014, Toyokawa Manami stopped activities due to her bad health and physical condition. Five days later, on January 6, the band began a tour, and otonamode's keyboardist, Yamamoto Kenta, acted as the support member for the band.
- On March 26, the band released a DVD containing a collection of music videos, titled anthology 1386.
- On May 23, the band announced that they would soon return to their indie name stylization, あまざらし, on September 9. Alongside this announcement, a new website was opened, containing the novel Starlight (スターライト), written by Akita Hiromu and illustrated by YKBX.
- On June 7, the band participated in a second rock festival that took place in Kanazawa City of the Ishikawa Prefecture. It was titled Hyakuman Ishi Ongaku-sai 2014: Mirion Rokku Fesutibaru (百万石音楽祭2014 〜ミリオンロックフェスティバル〜, A Million Stones Music Festival: Million Rock Festival).
- On September 9, they held an acoustic concert titled Amazarashi Puremiamu Raibu Senbun no Ichiya Monogatari "Sutāraito" (あまざらし プレミアムライブ 千分の一夜物語『スターライト』, Amazarashi Premium Live - The Story of a Thousandth of a Night: "Starlight").
- On August 29, the band released their second full-length album, called Yūhi Shinkō Higashizumu (夕日信仰ヒガシズム, Sunset Faith: The Sun Goes Down).
- On November 1, the band started a live tour titled amazarashi LIVE TOUR 2014 Yūhi Shinkō Higashizumu (amazarashi LIVE TOUR 2014 夕日信仰ヒガシズム). This tour had the most installations yet, with a total of eight.

=== 2015–2016: Sekai Shūsoku Ni Ichi Ichi Roku ===
2015

- On February 18 of 2015, the band released the maxi-single Kisetsu wa Tsugitsugi Shindeiku (季節は次々死んでいく, The Seasons Die One After Another). The title track was used as the ending theme song of the anime Tokyo Ghoul√A.
- On March 28, the band performed for the first time overseas at a Music Festival in Taiwan titled T-Fest 2015 Míngrì yīnyuè jì (明日音樂祭; Tomorrow's Music Festival) along with envy, TURTLE ISLAND, and MONKEY MAJIK.
- On August 13, Amazarashi Senbun no Ichiya Monogatari Sutāraito (あまざらし 千分の一夜物語 スターライト, Amazarashi – The Story of a Thousandth of a Night: Starlight) was released. The album consisted of studio recordings that the band had recorded using the arrangements from their previous acoustic concert. It was accompanied by the novel Starlight.
- On June 9, the band held a concert to commemorate the 5th anniversary of their debut. On the same day, the band streamed the concert live via APOLOGIES, their mobile app, to a limited number of just 400 fans. As a succession, on August 16, the band held a concert using 3D animation called "amazarashi 5th anniversary live 3D edition"
- On August 19, the band released their second maxi-single, titled Speed to Masatsu (スピードと摩擦, Speed and Friction). The title track was used as the opening theme for the Fuji Television original anime series, Ranpo Kitan: Game Of Laplace.
- On October 22, they were guest artists at "JFL presents LIVE FOR THE NEXT supported by ELECOM", an event supported by JAPAN FM LEAGUE, the event had other bands such as YEN TOWN BAND, flower in the basement, Lily-Chou-Chou, and other artists.
- On December 29, the band participated in COUNTDOWN JAPAN 15/16, on the GALAXY STAGE.

2016

- On January 17 of 2016, the band went on an eight-installment tour: Sekai Bunki Ni Rei Ichi Roku (世界分岐二〇一六, World Divergence 2016).
- On February 9, Akita Hiromu submitted 5 poems and 1 essay to the March edition of Bungeishunju, published by Bungeishunju Ltd. "Aomori Song", one of the five poems, was made available for free on music.jp. The renowned Sci-Fi Author, Miyauchi Yūsuke (宮内悠介) commented on the poem saying "While it seemed like it was presenting the prefecture and city, it didn't really define it, seeming like a Machida Kou's mindset work".
- On February 24, the band released its 3rd full-length, Sekai Shūsoku Ni Ichi Ichi Roku (世界収束二一一六, World Convergence 2116).
- On the same day, the Mika Nakashima tribute album, MIKA NAKASHIMA TRIBUTE, performed by various artists, was released. It featured a self-cover of Boku ga Shinō to Omotta no wa, the song that Akita previously composed for her.
- On June 22, the band released the DVD of the live shows from their tour Sekai Bunki Ni Rei Ichi Roku.
- On October 12, the band released their 7th post-debut EP, titled Kyomubyō (虚無病, Nihility Disease).
- On October 15, the band held the one-band concert amazarashi LIVE 360° "Kyomubyō" at Makuhari Messe Event Hall. The concert featured a reading of Kyomubyō, the novel that came with the EP of the same title. For the concert, the band performed on a four-sided stage with large digital screens covering them from all sides so that the audience surrounded the band, hence the title "LIVE 360°".
- On December 28, the band participated in COUNTDOWN JAPAN 16/17.

=== 2017–2018: From Message Bottle to Chihō Toshi no Memento Mori ===
2017

- On February 22 of 2017, the band released their third maxi-single, Inochi ni Fusawashii (命にふさわしい, Deserving of Life), which was a tie-up with the famous video-game writer, director and designer, Yoko Taro, and his game NieR:Automata. The music video of the title track was also made in collaboration with the game.
- From March 26 to October 19, the band held a live tour called "Amazarashi Live Tour Message Bottle". It was the first live tour that featured a show in the band's hometown, Aomori.
- On March 29, the band released a compilation album titled Message Bottle (written as "メッセジボトル" when necessary), which featured tie-up track "Hero" (ヒーロー), a remade version of the song "Tsujitsuma Awase ni Umareta Bokura" (つじつま合わせに生まれた僕等, "We Were Born Because It Was Logical"), and the あまざらし-era album Hikari, Saikō (光、再考, Light, Reconsidered).
- On the same day, the band ASIAN KUNG-FU GENERATION released their 20th year commemorative tribute album, AKG TRIBUTE, in which amazarashi was featured, covering Natsu no Hi, Zanzou (夏の日、残像, Summer Day, Afterimage).
- On June 21, the band released a DVD of their previous concert, amazarashi LIVE 360° "Kyomubyō".
- On August 19, the band participated on SUMMER SONIC 2017, performing on Rainbow Stage.
- On September 6, the band released their 4th Maxi Single, Sora ni Utaeba (空に歌えば, Singin' to the Sky), which was featured as the 3rd opening of the shounen anime series My Hero Academia.
- On December 6 and 7, Hiromu Akita's solo concert, Riron Busou Kaijyo (理論武装解除, Disarmament Theory) was held.
- On December 13, the band released its 4th full-length album, Chihō Toshi no Memento Mori (地方都市のメメント・モリ, The Local City's Memento Mori).
- On December 28, the band performed in COUNTDOWN JAPAN 17/18.

2018

- From March 3, 2018, to April 5, 2018, amazarashi toured in 4 cities in Asia with Aimer.
- On March 12, the digital single "Getsuyōbi" (月曜日; "Monday") was released as a collaboration with the manga Getsuyōbi no Tomodachi (月曜日の友達, Monday's Friends).
- From April 20 to June 22, amazarashi held their Chihō Toshi no Memento Mori tour.

=== 2020: Boycott ===
2020

- Boycott was released on March 11, 2020, and includes 14 songs.

== Members ==
- Hiromu Akita (秋田弘; alternatively written and stylized as 秋田ひろむ) — lead vocals, guitar, songwriting. He is from Yokohama, Kamikita district, in Aomori but lived in Mutsu. Since 2017, the singer lives in the city of Aomori. He started getting interested in music as he heard his older sister listening to TM NETWORK, when he was in 6th grade. Later on, he bought a keyboard and entered a cover band of THE BLUE HEARTS. His inspirations as a performer are from Mashima Masatoshi (The Cro-Magnons, ex BLUE HEARTS) and Tomokawa Kazuki, and from Shuji Terayama and Osamu Dazai as a writer. He also became a fan of artists such as Yakozen, THA BLUE HERB, RHYMESTER, Katsuyuki Kobayashi, SHINGO Nishinari and Oni. He also participated in a tribute movie to the rapper 不可思議/wonderboy (Fukashigi/wonderboy) called living behavior.
- Manami Toyokawa (豊川真奈美) — keyboard, backing vocals

=== Support members ===
- Dewa Yoshiaki (出羽良彰) — guitar, programming, arrangements
- Makoto Hashiyada (橋谷田真) — percussion
- Takefumi Nakamura (中村武文) — bass guitar
- Yamamoto Kenta (山本健太) — keyboard during the period Manami had bad physical condition

=== Amazarashi Senbun no Ichiya Monogatari Sutāraito support members ===
- Koshikawa Masayuki — bass guitar
- Kimura Masayuki — bass guitar
- Murata Yasuko — viola
- Suhara Anzu — violin
- Suma Wasei — violin
- Yano Sayuri — violin

== Discography ==
=== Studio albums ===
Title	Album details	Peak positions
Title	Album details	JPN
Sennen Kōfukuron (千年幸福論, A Millenarian Happiness Theorem)	Released: November 16, 2011; Label: Sony Music Entertainment Japan; Formats: CD, digital download	12
Yūhi Shinkō Higashizumu (夕日信仰ヒガシズム, Sunset Faith: The Sun Goes Down)	Released: October 29, 2014; Label: Sony Music Entertainment Japan; Formats: CD, digital download	12
Sekai Shūsoku Ni Ichi Ichi Roku (世界収束二一一六, World Convergence 2116)	Released: February 24, 2016; Label: Sony Music Entertainment Japan; Formats: CD, digital download	4
Chihō Toshi no Memento Mori (地方都市のメメント・モリ, The Local City's Memento Mori)	Released: December 13, 2017; Label: Sony Music Entertainment Japan; Formats: CD, digital download	6
Boycott (ボイコット, Boikotto)	Released: March 11, 2020; Label: Sony Music Entertainment Japan; Formats: CD, digital download	2
Nanagō-sen Lost Boys (七号線ロストボーイズ, The Lost Boys of Route 7)	Released: April 13, 2022; Label: Sony Music Entertainment Japan; Formats: CD, digital download	4
Eienshi (永遠市, The Eternal City)	Released: October 25, 2023; Label: Sony Music Entertainment Japan; Formats: CD, digital download	7
Ghost (ゴースト)	Released: April 9, 2025; Label: Sony Music Entertainment Japan; Formats: CD, digital download	6

=== Mini albums ===
Title	Album details	Peak positions
Title	Album details	JPN
Hikari, Saikō (光、再考, Light, Reconsidered)	Released: February 18, 2009; Label: Rainbow Entertainment; Format: CD	—
0. (Limited release)	Released: December 9, 2009; Label: Rainbow Entertainment; Format: CD	—
0.6	Released: February 10, 2010; Label: Rainbow Entertainment; Formats: CD, digital download	—
Bakudan no Tsukurikata (爆弾の作り方, How to Make a Bomb)	Released: June 9, 2010; Label: Sony Music Entertainment Japan; Formats: CD, digital download	76
One Room Jojishi (ワンルーム叙事詩, One Room Epic)	Released: November 24, 2010; Label: Sony Music Entertainment Japan; Formats: CD, digital download	82
Anomie (アノミー, Anomī)	Released: March 16, 2011; Label: Sony Music Entertainment Japan; Formats: CD, digital download	41
Love Song (ラブソング, Rabu Songu)	Released: June 13, 2012; Label: Sony Music Entertainment Japan; Formats: CD, digital download	14
Nē Mama Anata no Iutōri (ねえママ あなたの言うとおり, Hey Mom, It's Just as You Said)	Released: April 10, 2013; Label: Sony Music Entertainment Japan; Formats: CD, digital download	8
Anta e (あんたへ, For You)	Released: November 20, 2013; Label: Sony Music Entertainment Japan; Formats: CD, digital download	11
Kyomubyō (虚無病, Nihility Disease)	Released: October 12, 2016; Label: Sony Music Entertainment Japan; Formats: CD, digital download	6
Reiwa Ninen, Uten Kekkō (令和二年、雨天決行, Reiwa Year Two^{a}, Rain or Shine)	Released: December 16, 2020; Label: Sony Music Entertainment Japan; Formats: CD, digital download	

a: In the traditional Japanese calendar, Reiwa 2 corresponds to the year A.D. 2020.

=== Compilation albums ===
Title	Album details	Peak positions
Title	Album details	JPN
Amazarashi Senbun no Ichiya Monogatari Starlight (あまざらし 千分の一夜物語 スターライト, Amazarashi – The Story of a Thousandth of a Night: Starlight)	"Unplugged" Compilation: Released: May 13, 2015; Label: Sony Music Entertainment Japan; Formats: CD, digital download	—
Message Bottle (メッセージボトル, Messēji Botoru)	Best-of Compilation: Released: March 29, 2017; Label: Sony Music Entertainment Japan; Formats: CD, digital download	3

=== Singles ===
Title	Single Details	Peak positions		Album
Title	Single Details	JPN Oricon	JPN Billboard	Album
Kisetsu wa Tsugitsugi Shindeiku (季節は次々死んでいく, The Seasons Die One After Another)	Released: February 18, 2015; Label: Sony Music Entertainment Japan; Formats: CD, digital download	11	13	Sekai Shūsoku Ni Ichi Ichi Roku (世界収束二一一六)
Supīdo to Masatsu (スピードと摩擦, Speed and Friction)	Released: August 19, 2015; Label: Sony Music Entertainment Japan; Formats: CD, digital download	14	31	Sekai Shūsoku Ni Ichi Ichi Roku (世界収束二一一六)
Inochi ni Fusawashii (命にふさわしい, Deserving of Life)	Released: February 22, 2017; Label: Sony Music Entertainment Japan; Formats: CD, digital download	5	24	Chihō Toshi no Memento Mori (地方都市のメメント・モリ)
Sora ni Utaeba (空に歌えば, Singin' to the Sky)	Released: September 6, 2017; Label: Sony Music Entertainment Japan; Formats: CD, digital download	13	7	Chihō Toshi no Memento Mori (地方都市のメメント・モリ)
Philosophy (フィロソフィー, Firosofī)	Released: October 20, 2017; Label: Sony Music Entertainment Japan; Format: digital download	—		Chihō Toshi no Memento Mori (地方都市のメメント・モリ)
Getsuyōbi (月曜日, Monday)	Released: March 12, 2018; Label: Sony Music Entertainment Japan; Format: digital download	—		Boycott (ボイコット)
Living Dead (リビングデッド, Ribingu Deddo)	Released: November 7, 2018; Label: Sony Music Entertainment Japan; Format: CD, digital download	9		Boycott (ボイコット)
Sayonara Gokko (さよならごっこ, Play Goodbye)	Released: February 13, 2019; Label: Sony Music Entertainment Japan; Format: CD, digital download	9		Boycott (ボイコット)
Mirai ni Narenakatta Ano Yoru ni (未来になれなかったあの夜に, To Those Nights That Couldn't Become the Future)	Released: November 20, 2019; Label: Sony Music Entertainment Japan; Format: digital download	9		Boycott (ボイコット)
Kyōkai-sen (境界線, Border Line)	Released: November 17, 2021; Label: Sony Music Entertainment Japan; Format: CD, digital download			Nanagō-sen Lost Boys (七号線ロストボーイズ)
Kashiopia Keiryūjo (カシオピア係留所, Cassiopeia Mooring)	Released: June 30, 2022; Label: Sony Music Entertainment Japan; Format: digital download			Eienshi (永遠市)
Antinomy (アンチノミー, Anchinomī)	Released: February 22, 2023; Label: Sony Music Entertainment Japan; Format: CD, digital download			Eienshi (永遠市)
Swipe (スワイプ, Suwaipu)	Released: April 26, 2023; Label: Sony Music Entertainment Japan; Format: digital download			Eienshi (永遠市)

=== Video works ===
Title	Details	Peak positions
Title	Details	JPN
0.7	Released: November 28, 2012; Label: Sony Music Entertainment Japan; Formats: CD, digital download, DVD	10
Anthology 1386	Released: March 26, 2014; Label: Sony Music Entertainment Japan; Formats: DVD, BD	58 (DVD); 54 (BD)
Amazarashi Senbun no Ichiya Monogatari Sutāraito (あまざらし 千分の一夜物語 スターライト, Amazarashi – The Story of a Thousandth of a Night: Starlight)	Released: May 13, 2015; Label: Sony Music Entertainment Japan; Formats: CD, DVD	56 (DVD); 10 (CD)
amazarashi Live Tour 2016 "Sekai Bunki Ni Rei Ichi Roku" (amazarashi Live Tour 2016「世界分岐二〇一六」, "World Divergence 2016")	Released: June 22, 2016; Label: Sony Music Entertainment Japan; Formats: DVD, BD	17 (DVD); 23 (BD)
amazarashi 360° Live "Kyomubyō" (amazarashi 360° Live「虚無病」, "Nihility Disease")	Released: June 21, 2017; Label: Sony Music Entertainment Japan; Formats: DVD, BD	20 (DVD); 18 (BD)
amazarashi LIVE "Riron Busou Kaijyo" (amazarashi LIVE「理論武装解除」, "Theoretical Argument Preparation Cancellation")	Released: June 6, 2018; Label: Sony Music Entertainment Japan; Formats: DVD, BD, DVD+CD, BD+CD	4 (DVD); 6 (BD)
amazarashi LIVE Rōdoku Ensō Jikken Kūkan: Shin Gengo Chitsujo (amazarashi LIVE 朗読演奏実験空間 新言語秩序, "The Storytelling Musical Performance Experiment: New Logos Order")	Released: March 27, 2019; Label: Sony Music Entertainment Japan; Formats: DVD, BD, DVD+CD, BD+CD	4 (DVD); 12 (BD)
amazarashi Live Tour 2019 "Mirai ni Narenakatta Subete no Yoru ni" (amazarashi Live Tour 2019「未来になれなかった全ての夜に」, "To Every Night That Couldn't Become the Future")	Released: November 27, 2019; Label: Sony Music Entertainment Japan; Formats: DVD, BD, DVD+CD, BD+CD	TBA

== Music videos ==
Year	Title	Director(s)
2010	Hikari, Saikō (光、再考, Light, Reconsidered)	YKBX
2011	"Karuma" Live at Shibuya WWW 06.19.2011 (カルマ Live at Shibuya WWW 06.19.2011, "Karma")	3LDK
2011	Karappo no Sora ni Tsubusareru (空っぽの空に潰される, Crushed by the Empty Sky)	Ryo Sekiwa
2011	Furui SF Eiga (古いSF映画, Old Sci-Fi Movie)	YKBX
2012	Namonaki Hito (ナモナキヒト, Nameless One)	YKBX
2012	Rabu Songu (ラブソング, Love Song)	YKBX
2012	"Karappo no Sora ni Tsubusareru" from 0.7 at Zepp DiverCity Tokyo (空っぽの空に潰される from 0.7 at Zepp DiverCity Tokyo)	Stubble
2013	Jubunairu (ジュブナイル, Juvenile)	YKBX
2013	Seizensetsu, (性善説 Theory of Fundamental Kindness)	Kanchiku Yuri
2013	Anta e (あんたへ, For You)	Kenji Kawasaki
2014	Anomī (アノミー, Anomie)	YKBX
2014	Kurisumasu (クリスマス, Christmas)	YKBX
2014	Natsu wo Matte Imashita (夏を待っていました, Waiting for the Summer)	YKBX
2014	Kono Machi de Ikite Iru (この街で生きている, I'm Living in This City)	3LDK
2014	Sutāraito (スターライト, Starlight)	YKBX
2014	Mō Ichido (もう一度, Once More)	YKBX
2014	Ana wo Hotte Iru (穴を掘っている, Digging Holes)	Daiki Ohno, Keiichi Motoyama
2015	Kisetsu wa Tsugitsugi Shindeiku (季節は次々死んでいく, The Seasons Die One After Another)	Ukyo Inaba, Keiichi Motoyama
2015	Jigyakuka no Arī (自虐家のアリー, Masochistic Ally)	Ukyo Inaba, Keiichi Motoyama
2015	Mudai (無題, Untitled)	YKBX
2015	Supīdo to Masatsu (スピードと摩擦, Speed and Friction)	Keiichi Motoyama, Yoshihito Mori
2015	Namae (名前, Name)	Ton Makino
2016	Tasūketsu (多数決, Majority Rule)	YKBX
2016	Endingu Tēmu (エンディングテーマ, Ending Theme)	Keiichi Motoyama, Asai Noritomo, Daisuke Hashimoto
2016	Kyomubyō (虚無病, Nihility Disease)	YKBX
2017	Inochi ni Fusawashii (命にふさわしい, Deserving of Life)	Ukyo Inaba, Keiichi Motoyama
2017	Hīrō (ヒーロー, Hero)	YKBX
2017	Tsujitsuma Awase ni Umareta Bokura (つじつま合わせに生まれた僕等, We Were Born Because it was Logical)	Hakomori Keisuke, Keiichi Motoyama
2017	Sora ni Utaeba (空に歌えば, Singin' to the Sky)	
2017	Firosofī (フィロソフィー, Philosophy)	Okuyama Yuuta, Inaba Ukyou
2017	Tarareba (たられば, What If)	Yutaro Kubo
2018	Ribingu Deddo (リビングデッド, Living Dead)	Hiromu Akita
2019	Sayonara Gokko (さよならごっこ, The Goodbye Game)	YKBX

== Songs appearances ==
Song title	Appearance	Year
Bakudan no Tsukurikata (爆弾の作り方, How to Make a Bomb)	WeMade Online's online FPS game Sting promotional song	2010
Anomī (アノミー, Anomie)	Heaven's Flower The Legend of Arcana TBS TV drama theme song	2011
Yoru no Uta (夜の歌, Night Song)	Fuji Television Keshouden ending theme	2011
Namonaki Hito (ナモナキヒト, Nameless One)	Nippon Television Onryuumon Music Dragon Gate ending theme 6th month	2012
Namonaki Hito (ナモナキヒト, Nameless One)	KBC Television V3 ending theme 6th month	2012
Jubunairu (ジュブナイル, Juvenile)	TV Tokyo Rock Kyoudai ending theme 3rd month	2013
Seizensetsu, (性善説 Theory of Fundamental Kindness)	Kansai Television On'emon Power Push 4th month	2013
Seizensetsu, (性善説 Theory of Fundamental Kindness)	Kansai Television Mujack 4th month ending theme	2013
Kisetsu wa Tsugitsugi Shindeiku (季節は次々死んでいく, The Seasons Die One After Another)	Anime Tokyo Ghoul √A ending theme	2015
Speed to Masatsu (スピードと摩擦, Speed and Friction)	Fuji Television anime Rampo Kitan: Game of Laplace opening theme	2015
Tasūketsu (多数決, Majority Rule)	Space Shower TV Collaboration Station ID Used Song	2016
Hīrō (ヒーロー, Hero)	TV Tokyo Drama Series Gin to Kin	2017
Inochi ni Fusawashii (命にふさわしい, Deserving of Life)	Square Enix's game NieR:Automata collaboration song	2017
Sora ni Utaeba (空に歌えば, Singin' to the Sky)	Yomiuri Television anime My Hero Academia 3rd opening song	2017
Firosofī (フィロソフィー, Philosophy)	Dydo Drinks "DydoBlend Coffee" commercial "Tomorrow Try"	2017
Sayonara Gokko (さよならごっこ, The Goodbye Game)	Anime Dororo ending theme	2019
Kyōkaisen (境界線, Boundary Line)	Anime 86 2nd opening theme	2021
Antinomy (アンチノミー, Anchinomī)	Anime Nier: Automata Ver1.1a ending song	2023

== Awards and nominations ==
Year	Award	Category	Work/Nominee	Result
2010	14th Japan Media Arts Festival	Entertainment	"Natsu wo Matte Imashita"	Won
2011	Annecy International Animated Film Festival	Music Video	"Christmas"	Nominated
2012	4th CD Shop Awards	Grand Prix	Sennen Koufukuron	Nominated
2013	18th Space Shower Music Video Awards	Best Your Choice	"Love Song"	Nominated
2015	20th Space Shower Music Video Awards	Best Video	"Ana wo Hotteiru"	Nominated
2019	Spikes Asia Festival of Creativity	Innovative Use of Technology	"The Dystopia Experience: A Rock Opera And The 10,000-mobile Resistance"	Won
