= Dear (Mika Nakashima song) =

Single by Mika Nakashima

from the album Real
- B-side: "A Miracle for You (2011)"
- Released: April 27, 2011 (Japan)
- Recorded: 2011
- Genre: J-pop, adult contemporary
- Label: Sony Music Associated Records
- Songwriter: Katsuhiko Sugiyama (Dear)
- Producers: Katsuhiko Sugiyama, Shin Kono

Mika Nakashima singles chronology
"Ichiban Kirei na Watashi o" (2010)	"Dear" (2011)	"Love Is Ecstasy" (2011)

"Dear" is the thirty-third single by Japanese singer Mika Nakashima, released on April 27, 2011. It peaked at number 8 in the Oricon Weekly Singles Chart, and sold over 25,000 copies. In May 2011, the song was certified Gold by the RIAJ for digital downloads of over 100,000.

== Background ==
This single marked a comeback for Nakashima, who took a break from performing in October 2010 to seek treatment for her chronic Eustachian tube dysfunction. The title track was the theme song for the Japanese film Yōkame no Semi, in which Mao Inoue played the lead role.

For "Dear", Nakashima again collaborated with Katsuhiko Sugiyama, who wrote and composed her previous single, "Ichiban Kirei na Watashi o".

The coupling tune is a rearranged version of "A Miracle For You", a song from Nakashima's first album, True.

== Track listing ==
CD
No.	Title	Lyrics	Music	Arranger(s)	Length
1.	"Dear"	Katsuhiko Sugiyama	Katsuhiko Sugiyama	Katsuhiko Sugiyama, Tatsurou Ariki (strings arrangement)	5:13
2.	"A Miracle for You (2011)"	Mika Nakashima	Yasunari Okano	Shin Kono (arrangement & strings arrangement)	5:18
3.	"Dear" (Instrumental)	Katsuhiko Sugiyama	Katsuhiko Sugiyama	Katsuhiko Sugiyama, Tatsurou Ariki (strings arrangement)	5:13
4.	"A Miracle for You (2011)" (Instrumental)	Mika Nakashima	Yasunari Okano	Shin Kono (arrangement & strings arrangement)	5:16

== Charts ==
=== Oricon Sales Chart (Japan) ===
Release	Chart	Peak position	First-week sales	Sales total	Chart run
27 April 2011	Oricon Daily Charts			25,025	
27 April 2011	Oricon Weekly Charts	8	15,162	25,025	4 weeks
27 April 2011	Oricon Monthly Charts (April)	28		25,025	
27 April 2011	Oricon Yearly Charts			25,025	
