= Fat Cat (singer) =

South Korean singer (born 1990)

- Also known as: Defconn Girl
- Born: Kim So-young; March 14, 1990 (age 35); Seoul, South Korea
- Genres: K-pop
- Occupations: Singer; model
- Years active: 2011–present
- Labels: Yuri Entertainment; Curtain Call Media; Victor Entertainment

- Fat Cat
- Hangul: 김소영
- Hanja: 金素榮
- RR: Gim Soyeong
- MR: Kim Soyŏng

Stage name
- Hangul: 살찐 고양이
- RR: Saljjin Goyangi
- MR: Saltchin Koyangi

Fat Cat (Korean: 살찐 고양이; born March 14, 1990), also known as Defconn Girl (데프콘 걸), is a South Korean singer.

== Career ==
Fat Cat gained notice after appearing in the music video for rapper Defconn's song "How Rappers Break Up Part 2," as well as for her participation in live performances with him. Her debut single, "Indifferent Love", was released on September 24.

On September 25, she debuted on SBS' Inkigayo with "Indifferent Love" and impressed many viewers including choreographer Bae Sang Mi, who created her "Tik Tok" dance for the song.

Later on, drama production company Curtain Call Media signed her up for a joint management deal in November 2011.

On January 5, 2012, Fat Cat released her second single album, "Is Being Pretty Everything". On January 5, the music video was released after previously releasing two teasers, and the following day, she made her return on KBS Music Bank.

On March 9, 2012, Fat Cat released her third single, "It's Like a Dream," which she promoted on Korean music shows. However, Fat Cat was diagnosed with a kidney disorder resulting in idiopathic edema on March 11, 2012, causing her activities for "It's Like a Dream" to be halted while she was hospitalized.

Fat Cat spent some time recovering from her illness and expected to resume activities in November 2012 or early 2013.

In Oct 2012, Fat Cat signed a three-year contract with Japanese recording company Victor-JVC and Japanese artist management and record company Rainbow Entertainment in preparation for her debut in Japan. She debuted with the single "Make Up" in July 2013.

== Personal life ==
She married in 2018.

== Discography ==
=== Singles ===
| Year | Title | Peak positions | | | | Sales | Album |
| Year | Title | KOR | Hot 100 K-Pop | JPN | Hot 100 J-Pop | Sales | Album |
|---|---|---|---|---|---|---|---|
| 2011 | "My Indifferent Love" (내사랑 싸가지) | 115 | — | — | — | KOR (DL): 46,000 | — |
| 2012 | "Is Being Pretty Everything?" (예쁜게 다니) | 23 | 28 | — | — | KOR (DL): 650,000 | — |
| 2012 | "It's Like a Dream" (꿈만 같아요) | 24 | 19 | — | — | KOR (DL): 377,000 | — |
| 2013 | "Tears Rain" (눈물비) | 34 | 64 | — | — | KOR (DL): 88,000 | King of Ambition OST, Part 4 |
| 2013 | "Make Up" | — | — | — | — | | — |
"—" denotes releases that did not chart or were not released in that region.

=== MV ===
- Defconn – 래퍼들이 헤어지는 방법 (How to Leave a Rapper, Part 2)

=== Collaboration ===
- Paul Baek (폴백) – "Hello, my ex"

== Modeling ==
- Vogue Girl
- Maxim
