= No More Rules =

No More Rules.

Compilation album by Mika Nakashima
- Released: March 3, 2009
- Recorded: 2002–2009
- Genre: J-pop, jazz, pop, easy listening, rock
- Length: 1:13:00
- Label: Sony Music Associated Records
- Producer: Various

Mika Nakashima chronology
Voice (2008)	No More Rules. (2009)	Star (2010)

No More Rules is Mika Nakashima's second compilation Japanese album and her tenth album overall. The album is composed of Kanebo Kate Cosmetics Tie-up songs. It includes a new song, GAME, which was used as the tie-up song for the Kanebo Kate Cosmetics Commercial entitled 'Stolen Jewel.'

This album, which includes jazz and rock-oriented songs, was limited to 50,000 copies in Japan (selling 55,938 copies), and is a Blu-Spec CD with a bonus DVD. The album is also currently available in Hong Kong as a CD+DVD, and was #1 on the Taiwan Album Chart.

== Track listing ==
No.	Title	Lyrics	Music	Arranger(s)	Length
1.	"Game"	Mika Nakashima	Kaoru Kami, Tomokazu Matsuzawa	Tomokazu Matsuzawa, The Hot Pantz (P.G.L.M)	4:14
2.	"Love Addict"	Mika Nakashima	Shinichi Osawa	Shinichi Osawa	7:12
3.	"Heaven on Earth"	Kenn Kato, Lori Fine (Coldfeet)	Lori Fine (Coldfeet)	Coldfeet	3:58
4.	"Seven"	Mika Nakashima	Lori Fine (Coldfeet)	Coldfeet	4:27
5.	"I Don't Know" (featuring Morisanchuu; performed as MICA 3 CHU)	Mika Nakashima, Lori Fine (Coldfeet)	Lori Fine (Coldfeet)	Coldfeet	4:40
6.	"Dance with the Devil"	Mika Nakashima	Yasunari Okano	Toshiyuki Mori	4:42
7.	"Isolation"	mmm.31f.jp	Yasuhiro Minami	Takamune Negishi	4:45
8.	"Kumo no Ito" (蜘蛛の糸)	Mika Nakashima	Yoshiko Goshima	Toshiyuki Mori	5:56
9.	"Venus in the Dark"	Mika Nakashima	Yasunari Okano	absolute3	6:02
10.	"My Sugar Cat"	Mika Nakashima	Yoshiko Goshima	Shunya Mori	5:10
11.	"Confusion"	Mika Nakashima, Masato Odake	Tomokazu Matsuzawa	The Flixx	3:30
12.	"Black & Blue"	Mika Nakashima, Lori Fine (Coldfeet)	Lori Fine (Coldfeet)	Shin Kōno	4:05
13.	"Blood" (NANA starring Mika Nakashima)	mmm.31f.jp	Shigekazu Koga	Takamune Negishi	4:40
14.	"It's Too Late"	Mika Nakashima, Ayumi Miyazaki	Lori Fine (Coldfeet)	Coldfeet	4:35
15.	"Fake"	Mika Nakashima, Ayumi Miyazaki	Ayumi Miyazaki	Ayumi Miyazaki	5:14

DVD
No.	Title	Length
1.	"15 TV-Commercial of Kanebo Kate" (TV commercial)
2.	"Game" (Music video)
3.	"Heaven on Earth" (Music video)
4.	"Love Addict" (Music video)
5.	"Venus in The Dark" (Music video)
6.	"Seven" (Music video)
7.	"Fake" (Music video)
8.	"Blood" (Nana starring Mika Nakashima; Live video)
9.	"Black & Blue" (Music video)
10.	"My Sugar Cat" (Music video)
11.	"I Don't Know （MICA3CHU）" (Music video)

== Charts and sales ==
=== Oricon sales charts (Japan) ===
Release	Chart	Peak position	First week sales	Sales total
March 4, 2009	Oricon Daily Albums Chart	3		
March 4, 2009	Oricon Weekly Albums Chart	5	46,673	55,918
