= Orion (Mika Nakashima song) =

Single by Mika Nakashima

from the album Voice
- A-side: "Orion"
- B-side: "Focus"
- Released: November 12, 2008
- Genre: J-pop, Adult contemporary music, Rock music
- Label: Sony

Mika Nakashima singles chronology
"I Don't Know" (2008)	"Orion" (2008)	"Over Load" (2009)

"Orion" is Mika Nakashima's 27th single, released on November 12, 2008. It was the insert song for the Japanese TBS drama, Ryūsei no Kizuna, in which Mika co-starred. The "B-side" song, "FOCUS", was used for the television commercial of the Canon IXY Digital 920 IS camera. Orion, a lite rock-influenced ballad, has sold over 1.300.000 digital downloads.

The single is certified Gold by RIAJ for shipment for 100,000 copies and Million for digital downloads.

== Track listing ==
CD
No.	Title	Lyrics	Music	Arranger(s)	Length
1.	"Orion"	Rui Momota	Rui Momota	Rui Momota
2.	"Focus"	Mika Nakashima	Akihisa Matsuura	Yoshito Tanaka
3.	"Orion" (Instrumental)	Rui Momota	Rui Momota	Rui Momota
4.	"Focus" (Instrumental)	Mika Nakashima	Akihisa Matsuura	Yoshito Tanaka

== Charts ==
=== Oricon sales chart (Japan) ===
Release	Chart	Peak position	Sales total
12 November 2008	Oricon Daily Singles Chart	3	
12 November 2008	Oricon Weekly Singles Chart	6	63,218
12 November 2008	Oricon Monthly Singles Chart	20	
12 November 2008	Oricon Yearly Singles Chart	142	
