= Star (Mika Nakashima album) =

Studio album by Mika Nakashima
- Released: October 27, 2010
- Recorded: 2009–2010
- Genre: J-pop
- Length: 1:10:02
- Label: Sony Music Japan

Mika Nakashima chronology
No More Rules (2009)	Star (2010)	Real (2013)

Singles from Real
- 1. "Over Load" Released: May 13, 2009; 2. "Candy Girl" Released: September 30, 2009; 3. "Nagareboshi" Released: November 4, 2009; 4. "Always" Released: January 20, 2010; 5. "Ichiban Kirei na Watashi o" Released: August 25, 2010

Star is the seventh studio album (eleventh overall) by Japanese singer Mika Nakashima. It was released via Sony Music Japan on October 27, 2010, and was distributed in two formats: a CD-only standard version and a CD+DVD limited edition. Five singles were spawned from the record, including "Candy Girl", "Always" and "Ichiban Kirei na Watashi o".

Commercially, Star peaked at number three on the Oricon Albums Chart and had first week sales of 92,962 copies, a somewhat lower figure compared to her previous records. It went on to sell 155,457 copies within a month upon its release and was certified gold by the Recording Industry Association of Japan (RIAJ). Since then, the album has sold over 180,000 copies in Japan.

== Singles ==
"Over Load" was released as the record's first single on May 13, 2009. "Over Load" was used in a Lipton Limone Commercial May 2009 where Mika starred as the model. Along with the B-side track "No Answer," the release exhibits a bright pop sound with oriental string-based instrumentations.

"Candy Girl" is a collaboration with Japanese women's fashion company Sly. Released on September 30, 2009, four editions of Candy Girl were made available with each having a different CD cover and design. Three of the versions are limited edition releases, with each containing a different T-shirt sporting the message: "Wake Up, Travelling Circus is Coming," in different colors. Musically, "Candy Girl" is a jazz-inflected soft pop song revolving around circus themes. Its B-side "Smiley" utilizes acoustic instrumentals with a jazz-tinged arrangement.

"Nagareboshi" is a pop-infused ballad with the track "Memory" as the B-side. The next single, "Always", is the theme to the film Sayonara Itsuka starring Miho Nakayama. The first press of "Always" came with a 2010 calendar, featuring photoshoots designed by Nakashima herself. The B-sides "Baby Baby Baby" and "Spiral" were featured in several commercials in Japan.

"Ichiban Kirei na Watashi o" (trans. "The Most Beautiful Me") is the record's fifth single and Nakashima's thirty-second overall. Released on August 25, 2010, it was the theme song for the TBS TV series, Unubore Deka (trans. Conceited Detective). Nakashima played the supporting role of Rie Hagurashi in the series. Musically, the is characterized for its "old-sounding" tune reminiscent of 20th-century Japanese pop songs.

== Track listing ==
No.	Title	Lyrics	Music	Arranger(s)	Length
1.	"Always"	Rui Momota	Rui Momota	Kenji Tamai, Rui Momota	5:13
2.	"Ichiban Kirei na Watashi o" (一番綺麗な私を)	Katsuhiko Sugiyama	Katsuhiko Sugiyama	Katsuhiko Sugiyama	4:30
3.	"Baby Baby Baby"	Mika Nakashima	Ryosuke Sakai	Shin Kono	5:42
4.	"Over Load"	Mika Nakashima	Kosuke Morimoto	Kazuto Okawa	4:42
5.	"Game"	Mika Nakashima	Kaoru Kami, Tomokazu Matsuzawa	Tomokazu Matsuzawa, The Hot Pantz (P.G.L.M)	4:14
6.	"Smiley"	Mika Nakashima	Atsushi Kimura	Kota Hashimoto	4:43
7.	"Candy Girl"	Ayumi Miyazaki	Hipjoint	Icedown	4:06
8.	"Lonely Star"	Mika Nakashima	Shinya Fujiwara	Tomokazu Matsuzawa	4:33
9.	"No Answer"	Mika Nakashima	Kenichi Takemoto	Yoshito Tanaka	4:14
10.	"Spiral"	Ayumi Miyazaki, Mika Nakashima	Red-T	Yoshito Tanaka	4:40
11.	"Memory" (feat.Daishi Dance)	Lori Fine (from Coldfeet)	Daishi Dance, Tomoharu Moriya	Daishi Dance, Tomoharu Moriya	6:51
12.	"16"	Mika Nakashima	Yoko Kuzuya	Makoto Saito	4:37
13.	"Nagareboshi" (流れ星)	Kenji Kubo, Yusuke Tanaka	Yusuke Tanaka	Yusuke Tanaka	6:07
14.	"Song for a Wish"	Ryoichi Higuchi	Ryoichi Higuchi	Shinya Kiyozuka	5:50

DVD
No.	Title	Length
1.	"Always" (Music video)
2.	"Ichiban Kirei na Watashi o" (Music video)
3.	"Over Load" (Music video)
4.	"Game" (Music video)
5.	"Candy Girl" (Music video)
6.	"Nagareboshi" (Music video)

== Charts and sales ==
=== Weekly charts ===
Chart (2010)	Peak position
Japanese Albums (Oricon)	3
South Korean Albums (Gaon)	16
South Korean International Albums (Gaon)	3
Taiwan J-pop Albums (G-Music)	6

=== Year-end charts ===
Chart (2010)	Position
Japanese Albums (Oricon)	44

== Sales and certifications ==
Region	Certification	Certified units/sales
Japan (RIAJ)	Gold	180,066
