= Over Load =

Single by Mika Nakashima

from the album Star
- A-side: "Over Load"
- B-side: "No Answer"
- Released: May 13, 2009
- Genre: J-pop
- Label: Sony
- Composer: Kosuke Morimoto

Mika Nakashima singles chronology
"Orion" (2008)	"Over Load" (2009)	"Candy Girl" (2009)

"Over Load" is Mika Nakashima's 28th single, released on 13 May 2009. The carrier track, "Over Load," was used in the May 2009 Lipton Limone Commercial wherein Mika was the commercial model.

Over Load and its B-side, "No Answer," are best described as light pop songs with oriental string-based backgrounds.

== Track listing ==
All lyrics are written by Mika Nakashima.

CD
No.	Title	Music	Arranger(s)	Length
1.	"Over Load"	Kosuke Morimoto	Kazuto Okawa
2.	"No Answer"	Kenichi Takemoto	Yoshito Tanaka
3.	"Over Load" (Hidefumi Kenmochi Remix)	Kosuke Morimoto	Kazuto Okawa, Hidefumi Kenmochi (remix)
4.	"Over Load" (Instrumental)	Kosuke Morimoto	Kazuto Okawa
5.	"No Answer" (Instrumental)	Kenichi Takemoto	Yoshito Tanaka

== Live performances ==
1. 05/15 - Music Station
2. 05/15 - Music Fighter
3. 05/16 - CD TV
4. 05/17 - Utaban

=== Oricon Singles Chart (Japan) ===
Release	Chart	Peak position	Sales total	Chart run
13 May 2009	Daily Singles Chart	7		
13 May 2009	Weekly Singles Chart	8	26,282	8 weeks
13 May 2009	Monthly Singles Chart	27		
13 May 2009	Yearly Singles Chart	N/A		
