= Heaven's Flower The Legend of Arcana =

- Starring: Umika Kawashima; Yoshiko Mita; Gō Ayano; Yūta Nakano; Hirotarō Honda; Ryū Morimiya; Seika Taketomi; Kazuki Namioka; Hirofumi Araki; Tarō Suruga
- Country of origin: Japan
- Original language: Japanese
- No. of seasons: 1
- No. of episodes: 11

Original release
- Network: TBS
- Release: 14 January – 4 March 2011

Heaven's Flower The Legend of Arcana (ヘブンズ・フラワー The Legend of ARCANA, Hebunzu Furawaa The Legend of Arcana) is a Japanese television drama series that aired on TBS from 14 January to 4 March 2011. The theme song of the series is Anomii by amazarashi.

== Cast ==
- Umika Kawashima as Ai
- Yoshiko Mita
- Gō Ayano as Shion
- Yūta Nakano as Naruki
- Hirotarō Honda
- Ryū Morimiya
- Seika Taketomi
- Kazuki Namioka
- Hirofumi Araki
- Tarō Suruga
