= Voice (Mika Nakashima album) =

Studio album by Mika Nakashima
- Released: November 26, 2008
- Recorded: 2007–2008
- Genres: J-pop; jazz; rock
- Length: 1:07:30
- Languages: Japanese; English
- Label: Sony Music Associated Records

Mika Nakashima chronology
Yes (2007)	Voice (2008)	No More Rules (2009)

Singles from Real
- 1. "Life" Released: August 22, 2007; 2. "Eien no Uta" Released: October 3, 2007; 3. "Sakura Hanagasumi" Released: March 12, 2008; 4. "I Don't Know" Released: July 23, 2008; 5. "Orion" Released: November 12, 2008

Professional ratings
Review scores
Source	Rating
AllMusic	3.5/5 stars

Voice is the sixth studio album (ninth overall) by Japanese singer Mika Nakashima, released via Sony Music Associated Records on November 26, 2008. It contains all of her singles from "Life" up to "Orion". The album was distributed in two formats: a CD-only version and CD+DVD limited edition.

Following its release, Voice became Nakashima's first number one album on the Oricon Albums Chart since Best (2005). It has been certified platinum by the RIAJ for physical shipments of over 250,000 copies in Japan, and has since amassed sales of over 340,000 copies.

== Singles ==
"Life" was released as the album's first single on August 22, 2007. The song is an adult contemporary pop/rock number and was used as the theme song for the drama of the same name, starring Kie Kitano and Saki Fukuda. The B-side "It's Too Late" was used for an Kanebo Cosmetics CM, which starred Nakashima herself.

"Eien no Uta" is a reggae-inflected ballad with Stephen McGregor serving as the producer. It was used as the theme song of the movie Southbound (2007). The B-side is a cover of Cole Porter's "You'd Be So Nice To Come Home To," and was made with jazz band Katteni-Shiyagare and previously included on her Katteni-Shiyagare tribute album, Let's Get Lost.

"Sakura Hanagasumi" is an adult contemporary ballad with a more poignant mood than "Sakurairo Mau Koro" (2005). The Daishi dance version of the song appears on the Voice album instead of the original version, which is featured in its promotional video. The next release, "I Don't Know", was Mika's first English-language single. It is a collaboration with owarai group Morisanchuu and was her first single to be released in a CD+DVD format in addition to the regular CD-only format. It includes the B-side track "Shut Up".

"Orion" is an lite rock-influenced ballad and was released on November 12, 2008. It was the insert song for the Japanese TBS drama, Ryūsei no Kizuna, in which co-starred Mika. The B-side song "Focus" was used for the television commercial of the Canon IXY Digital 920 IS camera.

== Track listing ==
No.	Title	Lyrics	Music	Arranger(s)	Length
1.	"Life"	Ren Takayanagi, Heroism	Junkoo	Coldfeet	4:02
2.	"Sakura: Hanagasumi (花霞; Cherry Blossoms: Flower Haze)" (Daishi Dance)	Mona, Hiroki Nagase	Hiroki Nagase	Daishi Dance, Tomoharu Moriya	6:09
3.	"Focus"	Mika Nakashima	Akihisa Matsuura	Yoshito Tanaka; Brass Arrangement: Yoshinari Takegami	4:40
4.	"Eien no Uta" (永遠の詩; Eternal Song)	Kazufumi Miyazawa	Sin	Stephen McGregor; String Arrangement: Shunya Mori	5:45
5.	"Orion"	Rui Momota	Rui Momota	Rui Momota	4:48
6.	"Anata ga Iru Kara" (あなたがいるから; Because You Are Here)	Haruna Yokota	Haruna Yokota	Naohisa Taniguchi	4:34
7.	"My Gentleman"	Mika Nakashima	Akihisa Matsuura	Akihisa Matsuura	4:34
8.	"Trust Your Voice"	Mika Nakashima	Lensei	Shin Kono	4:15
9.	"It's Too Late"	Mika Nakashima, Ayumi Miyazaki	Lori Fine (Coldfeet)	Coldfeet	4:33
10.	"I Don't Know" (Mica 3 Chu)	Mika Nakashima, Lori Fine (Coldfeet)	Lori Fine (Coldfeet)	Coldfeet	4:39
11.	"Shut Up" (Mica 3 Chu)	Mika Nakashima, Lori Fine (Coldfeet)	Lori Fine (Coldfeet)	Coldfeet	3:53
12.	"Confusion"	Mika Nakashima, Masato Odake	Tomokazu Matsuzawa	The Flixx, Tomokazu Matsuzawa; Background vocal arrangement: Lori Fine (Coldfeet)	3:29
13.	"Flower of Time"	Masato Odake	Lensei	Akihisa Matsuura	6:27
14.	"Koe" (声; Voice)	Jun Shibata	Jun Shibata	Takefumi Haketa	5:42

DVD
No.	Title	Length
1.	"Life" (Music video)
2.	"Eien no Uta" (Music video)
3.	"Sakura: Hanagasumi" (Music video)
4.	"I Don't Know" (Music video)
5.	"Orion" (Music video)
6.	"Focus" (Music video)

== Charts and sales ==
=== Weekly charts ===
Chart (2008)	Peak position
Japanese Albums (Oricon)	1

=== Year-end charts ===
Chart (2008)	Position
Japanese Albums (Oricon)	50

== Sales and certifications ==
Region	Certification	Certified units/sales
Japan (RIAJ)	Platinum	343,000
