= Ichiban Kirei na Watashi o =

2010 single by Mika Nakashima

Single by Mika Nakashima

from the album Star
- B-side: "Ichiban Kirei na Watashi o (Reggae Disco Rockers Remix)"
- Released: August 25, 2010
- Recorded: 2010
- Genre: J-pop
- Label: Sony Music Associated Records
- Songwriter: Katsuhiko Sugiyama

Mika Nakashima singles chronology
"Always" (2010)	"Ichiban Kirei na Watashi o" (2010)	"Dear" (2011)

Audio sample
- "Ichiban Kirei na Watashi o": file; help

"Ichiban Kirei na Watashi o" (一番綺麗な私を; "The Most Beautiful Me") is the thirty-second single by Japanese singer Mika Nakashima. Released on August 25, 2010, it was the theme song for the TBS TV series, Unubore Deka (うぬぼれ刑事; Conceited Detective). Nakashima played the supporting role of Rie Hagurashi in the TV series.

This song has been noted for its "old-sounding" tune reminiscent of 20th-century Japanese pop songs, such as Teresa Teng's; J-pop hit songs have mostly been under the strong influence of electronic elements from the likes of synthpop, techno, hip hop and Eurobeat since the 1990s.

== Track listing ==
All tracks are written by Katsuhiko Sugiyama.

CD
No.	Title	Length
1.	"Ichiban Kirei na Watashi o (一番綺麗な私を)"
2.	"Ichiban Kirei na Watashi o (一番綺麗な私を)" (Reggae Disco Rockers Remix)
3.	"Ichiban Kirei na Watashi o (一番綺麗な私を)" (Instrumental)

DVD
No.	Title	Length
1.	"Ichiban Kirei na Watashi o (一番綺麗な私を)" (Music video)

== Charts ==
=== Oricon Sales Chart (Japan) ===
Release	Chart	Peak position	First week sales	Sales total	Chart run
August 25, 2010	Oricon Daily Charts	11		35,000	
August 25, 2010	Oricon Weekly Charts	10	16,816	35,000	6 weeks
August 25, 2010	Oricon Monthly Charts (August)	33		35,000	
August 25, 2010	Oricon Yearly Charts			35,000	

"Ichiban Kirei na Watashi o" was certified platinum for Chaku-Uta Full sales of over 250,000.

=== Usen Chart (Japan) ===
It reached the top spot of the Usen Chart and stayed there for five consecutive weeks.
