= Real (Mika Nakashima album) =

- Album cover

Studio album by Mika Nakashima
- Released: January 30, 2013
- Genre: J-pop
- Length: 56:57
- Label: Sony Music Associated

Mika Nakashima chronology
Star (2010)	Real (2013)	Zutto Suki Datta ~All My Covers~ (2014)

Singles from Real
- 1. "Dear" Released: April 27, 2011; 2. "Love Is Ecstasy" Released: September 14, 2011; 3. "Ashita Sekai ga Owaru Nara" Released: September 19, 2012; 4. "Hatsukoi" Released: November 28, 2012

Real is a studio album by the Japanese singer Mika Nakashima. The album was first released in Japan on January 30, 2013 (for the Valentine's Day season), in Regular and Limited editions.

The non-single track "Kioku" was used as the Casio Sheen commercial song. "Epilogue" was the ending theme song for the TV program GRACE OF JAPAN ~Shizen no Naka no Kami~.

This album debuted at number 1 in the Oricon weekly charts, and marked the first time in 4 years for the singer to top said chart for either a single or album since Voice (released in November 2008); it was also her first chart topping work in Japan after she made a comeback from the 6-month hiatus resulting from her patulous auditory tube disorder.

It has also been released in Taiwan and South Korea.

Some presses of the album come with a bookmark denoting the artist and album name on one side, and a picture of a flower with the words "Be Real...Be Mine" on the other side of the bookmark.

== Tie-ins ==
Three of the four singles on this album are songs from motion pictures (an uncommon feature among studio albums).

- "Dear" was the theme song for the Japanese television drama Yōkame no Semi.
- "Love Is Ecstasy" was a theme song for the movie Unfair 2: The Answer.
- "Ashita Sekai ga Owarunara" was the main theme song for the Japanese dub of Resident Evil: Retribution. In it, Nakashima reprised her cameo role from Resident Evil: Afterlife.
- "Hatsukoi" was the theme song for the 2012 live-action film adaptation of Kyō, Koi o Hajimemasu.

== Track listing ==
CD
No.	Title	Writer(s)	Length
1.	"Hatsukoi (初恋; First Love)"	Takayuki Mitsuhashi	6:02
2.	"Dear"	Katsuhiko Sugiyama	5:12
3.	"Ashita Sekai ga Owaru Nara (明日世界が終わるなら; If the World Ends Tomorrow)"	Katsuhiko Sugiyama	4:29
4.	"Passion"		3:58
5.	"You Knocked Me Out"		3:15
6.	"Love Is Ecstasy"	Mika Nakashima, Nickii	3:46
7.	"Be Real"		4:36
8.	"Super Woman"		3:27
9.	"Supreme"		3:57
10.	"Pierce (ピアス)"		4:46
11.	"Kioku (記憶; Memory)"		5:25
12.	"Epilogue (エピローグ)"		4:29
13.	"Letter"		3:35

Limited Edition - DVD Music Videos
No.	Title	Length
1.	"Dear"
2.	"Love Is Ecstasy"
3.	"Ashita Sekai ga Owaru Nara (明日世界が終わるなら; If the World Ends Tomorrow)"
4.	"Hatsukoi (初恋; First Love)"

=== Oricon sales charts (Japan) ===
Release	Chart	Peak position	Debut sales	Sales total
January 30, 2013	Oricon Daily Albums Chart	1		
January 30, 2013	Oricon Weekly Albums Chart	1	49,098	89,295
January 30, 2013	Oricon Monthly Albums Chart (January 2013)	10		

== Certifications ==
Region	Certification
Japan	Gold

== Release history ==
Country	Date	Format	Label
Japan	January 30, 2013	CD (AICL-2499), CD+DVD (AICL-2497)	Sony Music Associated
Taiwan	February 1, 2013	CD+DVD (#88765467852)	Sony Music Taiwan
South Korea	February 5, 2013	CD	Sony Music Korea
