= Yes (Mika Nakashima album) =

Studio album by Mika Nakashima
- Released: March 14, 2007
- Recorded: 2006–2007
- Genre: J-pop; blues; pop
- Length: 1:07:00
- Label: Sony Music Associated Records

Mika Nakashima chronology
The End (2006)	Yes (2007)	Voice (2008)

Singles from Real
- 1. "Cry No More" Released: February 22, 2006; 2. "All Hands Together" Released: June 7, 2006; 3. "My Sugar Cat" Released: July 26, 2006; 4. "Mienai Hoshi" Released: February 21, 2007; 5. "Sunao na Mama" Released: March 14, 2007

Yes is the eighth album by Mika Nakashima; it is the fourth album to be released under her own name. It also was the first of her albums to have been released in both a CD only and a CD+DVD Limited Edition format. The album boasts a slower and more gospel-orientated arrangement.

The Limited Edition includes a bonus DVD featuring the videos for 'Cry No More,' 'Black & Blue,' 'All Hands Together,' 'My Sugar Cat,' 'Mienai Hoshi,' 'I Love You,' and a live recording of her cover of Louis Armstrong's 'What a Wonderful World.' The album and DVD are housed in a box slipcase with a different cover from the standard release of the album, and included a note with information on pre-ordering tickets to her Japan-wide concert tour, 'Yes My Joy,' before others with purchase of the album.

'Yes' debuted at #2 on the Oricon Daily Album Chart in Japan, but its weekly chart debut was at #3, selling 153,261 copies in its first week. To date it has sold close to 296,000 copies in Japan alone.

== Singles ==
"Cry No More" was released on February 22, 2006, and served as the first single from Yes. It replaced Chitose Hajime's "Kataritsugu Koto" as the closing theme for the anime Blood+. It is a blues-inflected single, and was recorded in the United States.

"All Hands Together" was released on June 7, 2006, and was recorded in Tennessee. It is a gospel and adult contemporary-styled charity single and her tribute to the victims of Hurricane Katrina, with the proceeds of the single going to help the victims of the hurricane. The single went on to sell 35,343 total copies. The reggae-inspired single "My Sugar Cat" was released on July 26 and follows similar styles of Nakashima's previous two singles. The B-side "Koishikute" is a cover of a song by Begin.

Nakashima's 21st single, "Mienai Hoshi", was released on February 21, 2007, and was used as the theme song of the drama Haken no Hinkaku. Its B-side track "I Love You" is a cover of the song by Ozaki Yutaka. "Mienai Hoshi" earned her highest first week sales of any single in two years, and became certified gold for physical shipments and platinum for ringtone sales.

The final single from Yes, "Sunao na Mama", was released in conjunction with the album's release on March 14. It appeared in a DoCoMo commercial and is described as a mid-tempo easy listening ballad. The b-side track "Fever" is a cover of the song sung by Peggy Lee. Nakashima's version of the song, which she recorded with bassist Ron Carter, originally appeared on Ken Shima's Jazz compilation album, Shimaken Super Sessions, in late 2006.

== Track listing ==
CD
No.	Title	Lyrics	Music	Arranger(s)	Length
1.	"I Love You" (Album Ver.)	Yutaka Ozaki	Yutaka Ozaki	Akihisa Matsuura	4:22
2.	"Mienai Hoshi" (見えない星; Invisible Star)	Hiroki Nagase	Nagase	Takefumi Haketa	5:16
3.	"Sunao na Mama" (素直なまま; The State of Honesty)	Ryoji	Ryoji	Yanagiman	5:24
4.	"Cry No More"	Kang Jin-hwa	Lensei	Shin Kono	4:40
5.	"All Hands Together"	Mika Nakashima, Soul of South	Lori Fine (from Coldfeet)	Kono	5:52
6.	"Dance With The Devil"	Mika Nakashima	Yasunari Okano	Toshiyuki Mori	4:37
7.	"Black & Blue"	Mika Nakashima, Lori Fine	Lori Fine	Kono	4:05
8.	"Joy"	Lori Fine	Lori Fine	Coldfeet	2:55
9.	"The Dividing Line"	Lori Fine	Lori Fine	Coldfeet	5:19
10.	"My Sugar Cat"	Mika Nakashima	Yoshiko Goshima	Shunya Mori	5:11
11.	"Yogoreta Hana" (汚れた花; Stained Flower)	Mika Nakashima	Taiji Sato	Sato	5:17
12.	"Going Back Home"	Kaori Mochida	Gajin	Kono	4:49
13.	"Kinenka" (祈念歌; Song of Prayer)	Kazufumi Miyazawa	Yasunari Okano	Kono	6:20
14.	"What a Wonderful World"	George David Weiss, Robert Thiele	George David Weiss, Robert Thiele	Dr.kyOn	2:52

DVD
No.	Title	Length
1.	"Opening"
2.	"Cry No More" (Music video)
3.	"Black & Blue" (Music video)
4.	"All Hands Together" (Music video)
5.	"My Sugar Cat" (Music video)
6.	"Mienai Hoshi" (Music video)
7.	"I Love You" (Music video)
8.	"What a Wonderful World" (live)
9.	"Ending Roll"

== Charts and sales ==
=== Weekly charts ===
Chart (2007)	Peak position
Japanese Albums (Oricon)	3

=== Year-end charts ===
Chart (2007)	Position
Japanese Albums (Oricon)	34

== Sales and certifications ==
Region	Certification	Certified units/sales
Japan (RIAJ)	Platinum	296,175
