= Ryūsei no Kizuna =

- First edition of novel
- Also known as: Ties of Shooting Stars
- 流星の絆
- Genre: Mystery; Suspense
- Created by: Keigo Higashino
- Written by: Kankurō Kudō
- Directed by: Kaneko Fuminori; Yasuharu Ishii
- Starring: Kazunari Ninomiya; Ryo Nishikido; Erika Toda; Akira Emoto; Tomokazu Miura
- Theme music composer: Takuya Harada
- Opening theme: Beautiful Days by Arashi
- Composer: Shin Kono
- Country of origin: Japan
- Original language: Japanese
- No. of episodes: 10

Production
- Executive producers: Aki Isoyama; Jun Nasuda
- Running time: approx. 49 minutes

Original release
- Network: TBS
- Release: 17 October – 19 December 2008

Ryūsei no Kizuna (流星の絆, lit. Meteor Bonds) is a detective novel by Keigo Higashino. It was serialized in Weekly Gendai from 16 September 2006 to 15 September 2007 and was published into one tankōbon volume by Kodansha on 5 March 2008. The novel was published in paperback format by Kodansha on 15 April 2011.

The novel was adapted into a Japanese television drama in 2008 starring Kazunari Ninomiya, Ryo Nishikido, and Erika Toda. With the opening theme "Beautiful days" by Arashi and the insert song "Orion" by Mika Nakashima, the drama series began on 17 October 2008.

== Plot ==
During their childhood days, the Ariake siblings — Kōichi, Taisuke, and Shizuna lived peacefully with their parents who owned a western restaurant named after their family name that specializes in hayashi rice. One day in the night, the siblings ran away from home to watch a meteor, just to later find out that their parents were killed while they were gone. The case remained unsolved due to lack of evidence and witnesses; only Taisuke has barely seen a suspect, and a plastic umbrella with no print was apparently left by the killer. Leaving a great impact to the lives of the sibling, they made a promise to find the killer and kill him themselves.

14 years later, having grown up in an orphanage, the siblings are now scammers. When Shizuna approaches their target, restaurant manager Yukinari Togami, she discovers that Yukinari's restaurant serves hayashi rice with exactly the same taste as the one their family restaurant used to serve. After seeing Masayuki Togami, Yukinari's father and owner of the Togami restaurant chain, Taisuke determines that he is the suspect he saw on the night of their parents' murder. The siblings conclude that Masayuki killed their parents and stole their family recipe of hayashi rice, but they can only find circumstantial evidence. Eager for Masayuki to face justice before the case expires, the siblings plant evidence to frame Masayuki, leading the police to notice Masayuki as a suspect. During the process, Yukinari and Shizuna develop romantice feelings for each other, and Yukinari caught Shizuna planting a recipe book in the Togami residence. Yukinari decides to assist the Ariake siblings to find out if Masayuki is the real killer.

With Yukinari's help, Kōichi and Taisuke visit the Togami residence disguised as police officers investigating the Ariake murder, and inform Masayuki that his DNA is found on an item at the crime scene, making him an official suspect. Masayuki accidentally reveals that he is aware that the item at the crime scene refers to a plastic umbrella, causing Yukinari, Kōichi and Taisuke to believe that he is indeed the killer. However, Masayuki reveals that he was at the crime scene that evening to purchase the hayashi rice recipe from the Ariake couple, only to find they were already dead. In shock, he left the scene with the recipe and was seen by Taisuke. However, Masayuki mistakenly took the killer's umbrella home, so the umbrella at the scene indeed belongs to him. He calls the police to his home and offers the killer's umbrella for finger printing.

From the scratches on the handle of the killer's umbrella, Kōichi deduces that the real killer is actually Yasutaka Kashiwabara, the police officer in charge of the Ariake's murder. The scratches are the result of the killer swinging the umbrella like a golf club, which is a habit of Yasutaka. Yasutaka left his umbrella at the scene on the night of the murder, and when he came back as a police officer, he wiped prints on the umbrella at the scene, which actually belongs to Masayuki. Kōichi confronts Yasutaka, who admits to the crime and kills himself. Yasutaka left a suicide note, admitting to killing the Ariake couple and framing Masayuki (he had found the Ariake siblings were behind the framing and wanted to protect them from legal consequences). Kōichi and Taisuke decide to return their scam money and surrender to the police for their scams. Yukinari proposes to Shizuna.

== Cast ==
- Kazunari Ninomiya as Kōichi Ariake (有明 功一, Ariake Kōichi)

- Ryusei Saito as young Koichi
Kōichi is the eldest of the Ariake sibling; he is 26 years old in the present time. He was the first one to discover his parents' dead bodies. Has great responsibility and dearly treasured his siblings. As the eldest son, he was expected to continue his father's restaurant, and has attended a cooking school, although according to him, it's "a waste of time." Kōichi is now working at "George Clooney," a curry house owned by his benefactor and lives there as well.

- Ryo Nishikido as Taisuke Ariake (有明 泰輔, Ariake Taisuke)

- Issei Kakazu as young Taisuke
Taisuke is the middle child and Kōichi's only blood-related brother; he is 24 years old in the present time. Taisuke is the only person who has barely seen a suspect. He is now working at adult DVD store "Tommy Lee George," owned by his benefactor as well. He is currently living at Shizuna's apartment.

- Erika Toda as Shizuna Ariake (有明 静奈, Ariake Shizuna)

- Sea Kumada as young Shizuna
Shizuna, or nicknamed "Shii" by her brothers, is the last child and the only daughter; she is 21 years old in the present time. Unknowingly to her, Shizuna has no blood relation to her brothers, but is an illegitimate child from her mother's previous affair with a man named "Yazaki."

- Jun Kaname as Yukinari Togami (戸神 行成, Togami Yukinari)

Yukinari is the only son and the heir of Togami western restaurant chain who is in attempt to recreate the original taste of hayashi rice. He is 29 years old.

- Toshinori Omi as George Hayashi (林 譲二, Hayashi Jōji)

George is the benefactor and a father figure of the Ariake sibling; he owned the orphan facility where the siblings spent their childhood at, a curry house, and an adult DVD store.

- Akira Emoto as Masayuki Togami (戸神 政行, Togami Masayuki)

Yukinari's father and the owner of Togami western restaurant chain.

- Ryo as Tōko Ariake (有明 塔子, Ariake Tōko)

Mother of the Ariake siblings. She was a hostess and was pregnant with one of her customer Yazaki before she met her current husband.

- Susumu Terajima as Yukihiro Ariake (有明 幸博, Ariake Yukihiro)

Father of the Ariake siblings and owner of Ariake western restaurant. The store is popular for its hayashi rice that made with secret recipe.

- Tomokazu Miura as Yasutaka Kashiwabara (柏原 康孝, Kawashibara Yasutaka)

The police who is in charge of Ariake's murder case.

- Osamu Shitara as Shinji Hagimura (萩村 信二, Hagimura Shinji)

Another police who is in charge of Ariake's murder case. When drunk, he acts like an onee.

- Kenta Kiritani as Hisanobu Takayama (高山 久伸, Takayama Hisanobu)

The boss at Shizuna's former office. He loves to put post-it notes on everything. He calls Shizuna "boring," but is actually has crush on her although his pride won't let him say it.

- Mika Nakashima as Sagi (サギ)

A mysterious girl with no eyebrows who often shows up at George Clooney; nobody knows her name because she simply never introduces herself. She calls Kōichi "Axel" and is attracted to him. She acts as the comic relief of the series.

=== Guests ===
- Taiyo Sugiura as Kazuya Saigō (ep 1,4)
- Shoko Ikezu as Miwa Katsuragi (ep 1)
- Tomiyuki Kunihiro as Nobuo Yazaki (ep 3,6)
- Seminosuke Murasugi as Katsuo Tsukimura (ep 3-5,8)
- Kazuaki Hankai as Teranishi (ep 3,6)
- David Ito as Takehiro Sawai (ep 4)
- Eri Tokunaga as Chiemi (ep 4)
- Yumi Aso as Toko Yazaki (ep 5,6)
- Aiko Morishita as Kimiko Togami (ep 5-10)
- Shoichiro Tanigawa as a restaurant manager (ep 5)
- Kiyohiko Ichihara as a shopkeeper (ep 5)
- Akio Kaneda as chief clerk (ep 7)
- Yusuke Shoji as Tsujimura (ep 7)

== Staff ==
- Script: Kankurō Kudō
- Soundtrack: Shin Kōno (河野 伸, Kōno Shin)
- Producer: Jun Nasuda (那須 田淳, Nasuda Jun), Akira Isoyama (磯山 晶, Isoyama Akira)
- Director: Kaneko Fuminori (金子 文紀, Fuminori Kaneko), Yasuharu Ishii (石井 康晴, Ishii Yasuharu)

== Episodes ==
No.	Title	Directed by	Written by	Original release date	Viewers (%)
1	"Higashino Keigo x Kudo Kankuro! The No.1 Tearful, Moving, Epic Mystery"; Transliteration: "Higashino Keigo X Kudo Kankuro! Namida no No.1 Misuterī Kandō Taisaku" (Japanese: 東野圭吾×宮藤官九郎! 涙のNo.1ミステリー感動大作)	Kaneko Fuminori	Kankurō Kudō	17 October 2008	21.2
2	"The Umbrella, the Portrait, and the Mysterious Woman"; Transliteration: "Kasa to Nigaoe to Nazo no Onna" (Japanese: 傘と似顔絵と謎の女)	Kaneko Fuminori	Kankurō Kudō	24 October 2008	17.3
3	"Parents' Secret and the Hashed Meat Prince"; Transliteration: "Oya no Himitsu to Hayashi no Ōji-sama" (Japanese: 親の秘密とハヤシの王子様)	Yasuharu Ishii	Kankurō Kudō	31 October 2008	15.0
4	"A Memory That is Connected to the Real Perpetrator"; Transliteration: "Shin Hannin to Tsunagatta Kioku" (Japanese: 真犯人と繋がった記憶)	Yasuharu Ishii	Kankurō Kudō	7 November 2008	15.6
5	"Enemy's Son and the Stolen Flavour"; Transliteration: "Ada no Musuko to Nusuma Reta Aji" (Japanese: 仇の息子と盗まれた味)	Kaneko Fuminori	Kankurō Kudō	14 November 2008	15.1
6	"We Are Not Real Brothers and Sister"; Transliteration: "Hontō no Kyōdai Janai" (Japanese: 本当の兄妹じゃない)	Kaneko Fuminori	Kankurō Kudō	21 November 2008	14.8
7	"Our Sister is in Love with the Enemy's Son"; Transliteration: "Imōto wa Ada no Musuko ni Hore Teru yo" (Japanese: 妹は仇の息子に惚れてるよ)	Yasuharu Ishii	Kankurō Kudō	28 November 2008	14.5
8	"Our Sister's True Self and the Cornered Perpetrator"; Transliteration: "Imōto no Shōtai to Oitsume Rareta Shin Hannin" (Japanese: 妹の正体と追いつめられた真犯人)	Yasuharu Ishii	Kankurō Kudō	5 December 2008	11.5
9	"Final Confession On the Day the Statute of Limitation Ends"; Transliteration: "Jikō Tōjitsu Saigo no Kokuhaku" (Japanese: 時効当日最後の告白)	Kaneko Fuminori	Kankurō Kudō	11 December 2008	15.4
10	"You Are the Perpetrator! The Fate of the 3 Siblings... A Tearful and Moving Final Episode!"; Transliteration: "Hannin wa Omaeda! 3 Kyōdai no Unmei Wa…Namida to Kandō no Saishūkai" (Japanese: 犯人はお前だ! 3兄妹の運命は…涙と感動の最終回!)	Kaneko Fuminori	Kankurō Kudō	18 December 2008	22.6

It was broadcast in the United States, Canada, and Puerto Rico through TV Japan, US affiliate of NHK, every Saturday from 10 October 2009.
