= Rainbow Entertainment =

Rainbow Entertainment Company Limited (株式会社レインボーエンタテインメント, Kabushiki Gaisha Reinbo Entateinmento) is a Japanese artist management and record company, which is a subsidiary of Tom Yoda's TY Limited Group and was founded on July 7, 2003. It is located at 4-6 Sarugakuchō, Ebisu-Ōmukai, Shibuya, Tokyo.

It also co-owns Sistus Records with NBCUniversal Entertainment Japan.

== Artists ==
- TiA (Pony Canyon)
- Jyukai (band) (UMJ/Geneon)
  - Manami Watanabe (UMJ/Geneon)
- Sachi Tainaka (UMJ/Geneon)
- Younha (UMJ/Geneon)
- Depapepe (SMEJ)
- I-dep
- Yacht. (SMEJ)
- Amadori
- Keigo Iwase
- Jackson Vibe (Avex)
- Sotte Bosse (UMJ)
- Nice Hashimoto (JVC)
- Minji (Dreamusic)
- Limelight (SMEJ)
- Zentaro Watanabe (Toy's Factory)
- Cargo
- 手裏剣ジェット
- Takachiya (SMEJ)
  - Soundland
- Youhei Oomori (SMEJ)
- Ayaka Ikio
- Chix Chicks
- cune
- Vasallo Crab 75
- Vish
- Doia Kane
- Viola
- Fusik
- Note Native
- DJ Kanbe
- Sinsuke Fujieda Group
- Language
- ウリフターズ
- Tate
- Beat Nature
- 0 Soul 7
- GRiP
- Lucky13
- Super Beaver
- Botchan
- 1000 Say
- SteAd
- SG Honeoka
- Kids Alike
- 50oldman
- The Baby Leaf
- Scarlet
- Four the MG
- Ephonoscope
- Setsuna Bluestar
- Green Ground Asia
- 2HT
- Laughlife
- Full Language
- Sidekick 9
- amazarashi (SMEJ)
- DJ Sarasa
- Mary
- r.a.m.
- The Unique Star

== Labels ==
- AZ Tribe
- bloom
- EChords
- Joy Rider
- Junkfood
- Knock Up!- joint venture with Tower Records Japan
- rebelphonic
- Sasso
- 257 entertainment

== See also ==
- Tom Yoda
