= Mika Nakashima =

Japanese singer and actress (born 1983)

- 中島 美嘉
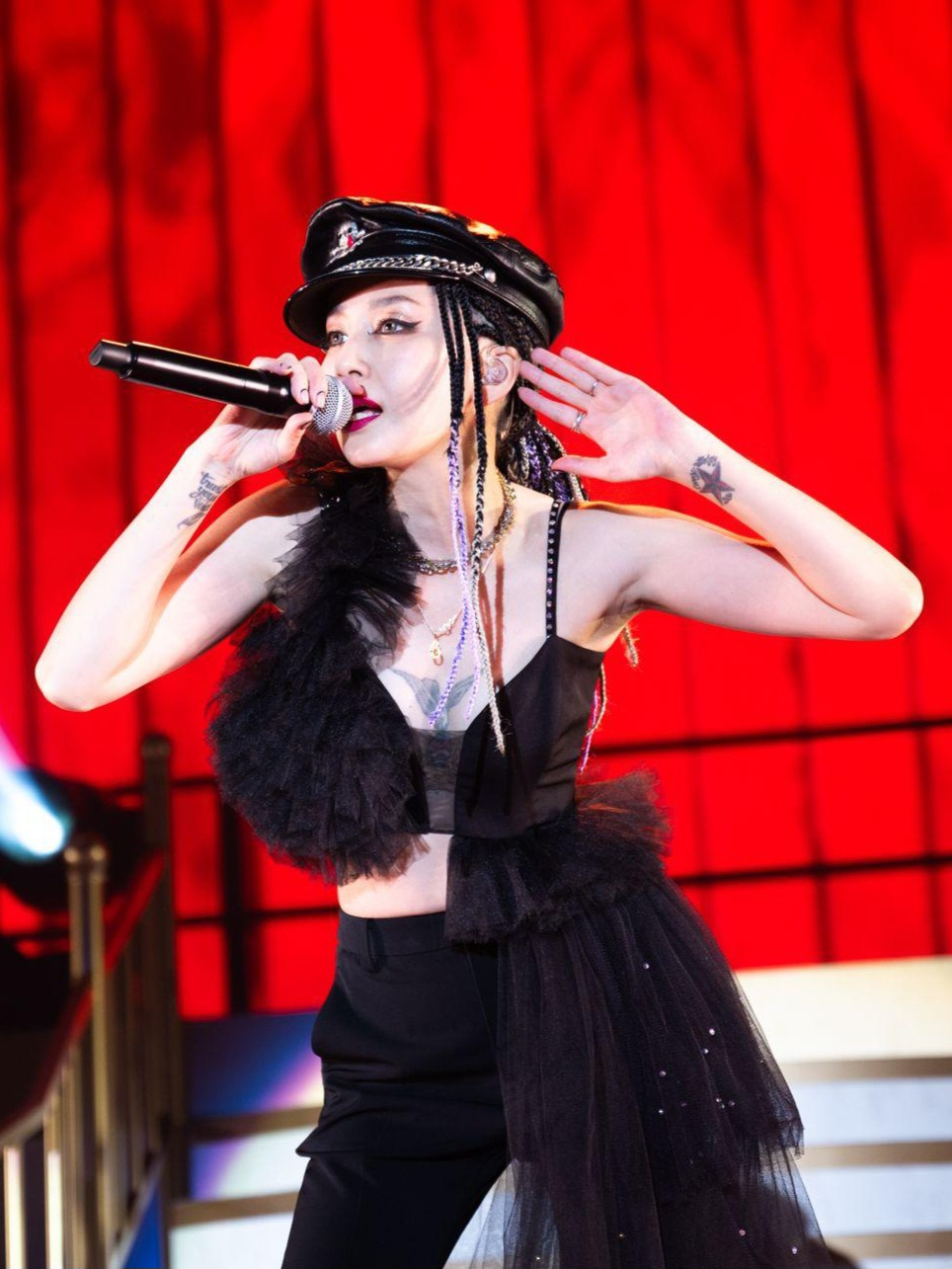
- Mika Nakashima at a 2024 Hong Kong concert
- Born: February 19, 1983 (age 43); Hioki, Kagoshima, Japan
- Other name: Nana
- Occupations: Singer; actress
- Spouse: Kunihiro Shimizu (m. 2014; div. 2018) Isamu Umatani (m. 2023)
- Musical career
- Genres: J-pop; blues; alternative rock; pop rock; jazz
- Instrument: Vocals
- Years active: 2001–2010, 2012–present
- Label: Sony Music Associated (2002–present)
- Website: www.mikanakashima.com

Mika Nakashima (中島 美嘉, Nakashima Mika; born February 19, 1983) is a Japanese singer and actress. Five of her studio albums, one of her mini-albums and one of her compilation albums have reached number one in Japan's Oricon album chart. She also embarked on an acting career, most notably as Nana Osaki in the live action film adaptations of Nana. She has sold over 10 million records in Japan.

== Early life ==
Born and raised in Kyushu, Mika was the youngest of three children. She grew up in the small town of Hioki, Kagoshima, where she has said there was "nothing there, only enka." She began listening to enka singer Eiko Segawa and studied classical Japanese dance, but as she loved dressing-up and make-up, she hoped to work in fashion magazines since she was too short to become a model. Nakashima decided not to attend high school after completing junior high and began working at the age of 15.

== Career ==
=== 2001–2004: Debut, True, Love, and Music ===
At the age of 17, she attended an audition not knowing what it was for. She was chosen from 3,000 girls to be the actress of the fall 2001 Fuji TV drama Kizudarake no Love Song (傷だらけのラブソング, Tainted Love Song), in which she played the heroine Mirai Shimazaki, and also sang the theme song, "Stars." In November 2001, "Stars" became her debut on Sony Music Associated Records, which would go on to become her best-selling single. Her second single "Crescent Moon", an 80s themed song, was limited to 100,000 copies. It sold out the first day of its release. In March 2002 she released her third single, "One Survive," and her first video collection, "Film Lotus". This was followed in May by her 4th single, "Helpless Rain", and in August, by her 5th single "Will", which went on to rack up sales of over 140,000. Both were top ten hits and sold around 100,000 copies, proving Nakashima's rising star appeal. Nakashima's first album, True, released in August 2002, was a number 1 hit on the Oricon charts. The album boasted a mature mixture of jazz and contemporary pop. In 3 weeks, True sold a million copies, and has sold nearly 1,174,000 copies to date. Then, as a commemoration of one year since her debut, Nakashima released a Premium EP: Resistance, which hit the charts' number 1 spot for two weeks in a row. On December 18, a documentary video, Kiseki: The Document of a Star, was released. In 2002, the singer received the "New Artist of the Year" award at the Japan Gold Disc Awards and "Best New Artist of the Year" at the All Japan Request Awards 2002. She also won the "New Artist of the Year" award from the 44th Japan Record Awards.

Nakashima's second album, Love, which was released in November 2003, sold nearly 1.45 million copies, surpassing that of her debut. The Japan Composers Association awarded Love the Best Album Award. After releasing a second mini-album, Oborozukiyo: Inori, in September 2004, Nakashima topped the Oricon Album Chart again with Music in March 2005, as well as with her first greatest hits album Best in December of that year. Best is the third album by Nakashima to have sold a million copies or more, but like her second album, Best also outsold True in sales - by nearly 30,000 copies.

=== 2005–2006: Movie debut and Nana ===
In 2005, Nakashima co-starred alongside Aoi Miyazaki in the live-action movie Nana, based on the manga of the same name, which was released September 10, 2005. She also sang one of the theme songs for the movie, which was released as a single under the name "Nana starring Mika Nakashima". The single, titled "Glamorous Sky," was written by the manga's author, Ai Yazawa, and composed by L'Arc-en-Ciel vocalist Hyde. It was Nakashima's only number 1 single on the Oricon Singles Charts. It sold over 423,000 copies in 2005, making it the best-selling female single of the year. The single continued selling well into the next year and sold 444,067 copies, which was about 25,000 copies less than her Nana co-star, Yuna Ito's "Endless Story". The single was featured in Konami's guitar/drum simulation game GuitarFreaks and Drummania V3, as well as Nintendo's Moero! Nekketsu Rhythm Damashii Osu! Tatakae! Ouendan 2.

Nakashima was nominated at the MTV Video Music Awards Japan as "Best Buzz Asia from Japan" for "Amazing Grace '05", and the "Glamorous Sky" video was nominated as "Best Female Video" and won the award for "Best Video from a Film". Due to the success of Nana, a sequel was released in December 2006. It included two new songs by Nakashima, again under the name Nana starring Mika Nakashima. The theme song to Nana 2 movie was "Hitoiro" (One Color), which was also written by Yazawa, with music composed by Glay's leader, Takuro, who also wrote the coupling song, "Eyes for the Moon". Besides the single, Mika released the album The End, featuring all songs released under the name Nana starring Mika Nakashima.

On December 18, 2006, Nakashima and Yui Ichikawa came to New York City for the International Premiere of Nana 2 at the IFC Center. Following the release of the Nana movie, Nakashima visited Memphis, Tennessee, and started another project beginning with the heavily gospel-influenced "Cry No More", the ending theme of the anime Blood+. She also contributed to the New Orleans charity tribute when she teamed up with American musicians Cyril Neville of the Neville Brothers and jazz pianist/musician Alan Toussaint. They released the single All Hands Together and as a result of her efforts, she was rewarded with an honorary citizenship of Memphis, Tennessee and a key to the city.

=== 2007–2008: Yes and Voice ===
A month later Mika released another single "My Sugar Cat," which dropped out of the Top 50 a week after its release. On February 21, 2007, Nakashima's 21st single, "Mienai Hoshi" was released. The single is the theme song for the Japanese drama Haken no Hinkaku (ハケンの品格, lit. Haken's Dignity), which aired starting January 10, 2007. The b-side track "I Love You" is a cover of the Ozaki Yutaka ballad. Promotional videos were made for both songs. On March 14, 2007, Nakashima's 5th studio album, Yes, was released in Japan. The title "Yes" continues Nakashima's trend of having one-word album titles, such as "Love" and "True", excluding the Nana album "The End". Her 22nd single, Sunao na Mama, was released on the same day. Following the release of Yes, Nakashima embarked on her first tour since 2005, Mika Nakashima's Concert Tour 2007 "Yes My Joy", which ended in late July and was subsequently released on DVD on November 7, 2007. Nakashima's 23rd single "Life" as well as "Film Lotus VI", her sixth compilation of music videos, were released in August 2007. "Life" was the theme song for the drama adaptation of the shoujo manga series of the same name by Keiko Suenobu. Nakashima's 24th single, "Eien no Uta", appeared in October 2007, and was the theme to the movie Southbound. Promotional videos were made for both Eien no Uta and its B-side, a cover of Cole Porter's "You'd Be So Nice to Come Home To".

Her 25th single, "Sakura: Hanagasumi", was released in March 2008. It reached number 12 on the Oricon chart. "I Don't Know", Nakashima's 26th single, was her first sung entirely in English. A collaboration with owarai group Morisanchū (森三中) it was released under the name MICA 3 CHU (Mikasanchuu) and Nakashima claimed it was her way to "vent my complaints and enjoy doing something really silly. The music of the song was too short to put so many words in Japanese so it was better in English, if I feel like doing it again, there will be more." Nakashima's next single, "Orion", was released on November 12, 2008. It was used as an insert song for the TBS drama "Ryusei no Kizuna", in which Nakashima herself appeared in a minor role. Nakashima's fifth studio album, Voice, was released on November 26, 2008. Voice, which leaned closer to a mainstream yet mature form of adult-oriented contemporary pop than her previous albums, was the first album by Nakashima to top the Oricon Album Chart since Best in 2005 and sold over 155,000 copies in its first week of release and over 340,000 copies in total.

=== 2009–2010: Star and film projects ===
After releasing a new album called No More Rules on March 5, 2009, Nakashima embarked on her fifth tour. This Japan-based tour was called the "Trust Our Voice Tour 2009", which started on April 10, 2009, and concluded in Tokyo at the end of July 2009. She introduced her then-new single, "Over Load", released on May 13, 2009, during the tour. "Life" ranked number 7 in JASRAC Award 2009: 10 best interactive song. "Life" was also used in the TV series Life (ライフ). The story is based on major school problems such as bullying, rape, abuse, etc. Nakashima's 29th single, "Candy Girl", was released on September 30, 2009, as a collaboration with the fashion brand SLY. Her 30th single, "Nagareboshi", was released on November 4, 2009.

Nakashima's first 2-disc concert DVD, Mika Nakashima Concert Tour 2009 Trust Our Voice, which was recorded during her "Trust Our Voice Tour 2009", was released on December 2, 2009. Nakashima's 31st single, "Always", was released on January 20, 2010, and was the theme song for the South Korean movie Goodbye, Someday (サヨナライツカ). She also starred in the Japanese supernatural monster film Death Kappa, which was directed by Tomoo Haraguchi. Nakashima's 32nd single, "Ichiban Kirei na Watashi wo" (The Most Beautiful Me; 一番綺麗な私を) appeared on August 25, 2010, as the tie-in song to the TBS drama series, Unubore Deka (Conceited Detective, うぬぼれ刑事). The drama focused on a story about a male detective that has the illusion of being the "ladies man". He is a romantic but conceited, he tries to convince female criminals, into either marrying him or being arrested. Mika Nakashima plays a role in the show as well. The name of her character in the television series is known as Rie Hagurashi.

In September 2010, she made her US film debut with a small role as J Pop Girl in the Sony Pictures film Resident Evil: Afterlife, based on the videogame series Resident Evil. On October 22, 2010, she announced she would be pulling out of her first performance at the Nippon Budokan commemorating her 10-year career and that she would be taking a break from singing while recovering from having patulous Eustachian tubes in both her ears. Nakashima's sixth studio album, Star, was released on October 27, 2010. In September 2012, Nakashima released the single Ashita Sekai ga Owarunara (明日世界が終わるなら, If the World Ends Tomorrow), which was the main theme for the Japanese version of the Resident Evil: Retribution film. She also reprised her Resident Evil: Afterlife role as J Pop Girl, the first zombie in Japan, in the film. On December 5, she released the single "Hatsukoi", which is the theme song for a live-action movie adaptation of the Kyō, Koi o Hajimemasu manga series by Kanan Minami.

=== 2011–2015: Real, Zutto Suki Datta, and film roles ===
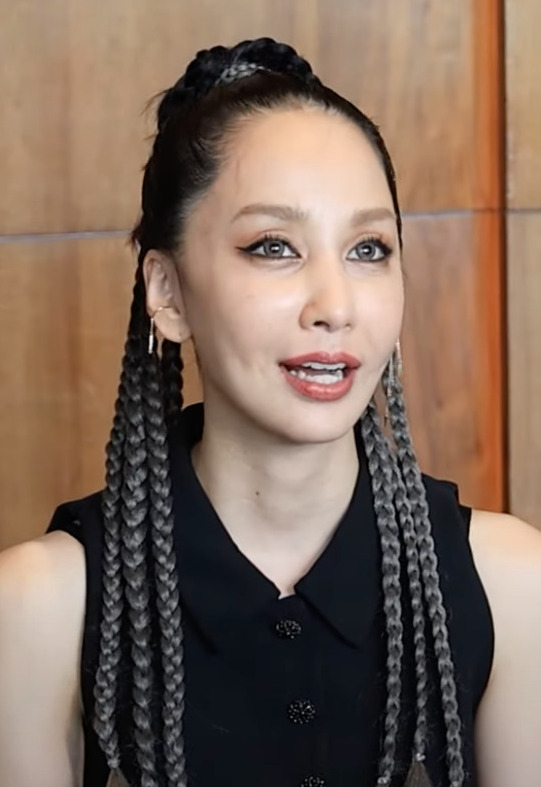
Nakashima in 2023

On January 30, 2013, Nakashima's seventh studio album, Real, was released. This year she also debuted as voice actress, as she starred the role of Lucy Wilde —originally voiced by Kristen Wiig— in the Japanese dub for the animated movie Despicable Me 2. In March 2014, Nakashima released her first cover album, entitled Zutto Suki Datta: All My Covers, which included previously released and known covers from her, including "Amazing Grace", "Oborozukiyo: Inori", "I Love You", and new songs as well, including a cover from Dreams Come True's "Yasashii Kiss o Shite". This same month she also collaborated with rapper Dohzi-T in a song titled "Dare yori mo", which was included on his album T's Music. On June 4, 2014, Nakashima released the collaboration single "Fighter" along with Miliyah Kato, which was chosen to be the theme song for the Japanese version of American film The Amazing Spider-Man 2. A remixed version of the song was also included in the compilation album One Love, One Rhythm for the 2014 FIFA World Cup, as Asia's theme song for this sports event.

A live tour titled "Mika Nakashima Concert Tour the Best Dears Tears" was held in 2015, showcasing songs from the albums Dears and Tears. On March 4, a new collection album named ~Healing Collection~ Relaxin was released, which included a compilation of poetry tracks. After a hiatus of five years, she made a comeback to acting on September 11 in the TBS TV drama Omotesando High School Chorus Club. On November 11, she started a new project group titled Mika Ranmaru and held a live event to unveil it. She also made appearances on Miyuki Nakajima Respect Live Utaen on the November 23 and 29, 2015.

On January 28, 2026, Nakashima released the full-length album Stage - The Musical in My Head.

=== Cover versions ===
"Yuki no Hana" was one of the most popular karaoke songs in Japan in 2004. It has also been covered by numerous artists including Joi Chua, Park Hyo Shin, Seo Young Eun, Han Xue, Vincy Chan, Eric Martin (Mr. Big's vocalist), Hayley Westenra, Hideaki Tokunaga and Gackt. Park Hyo Shin's version was an insert song for the popular Korean drama I'm Sorry, I Love You. "Find the Way" was covered by Korean singer Bada, who was a member of K-pop girl group S.E.S. Other popular covers have been recorded for "Stars" and "Sakurairo Mau Koro".

== Personal life ==
Nakashima married volleyball player Kunihiro Shimizu on December 25, 2014. Nakashima and Shimizu originally started to date in the summer of 2011, describing the interaction as love at first sight since Nakashima really enjoys watching volleyball. On February 2, 2018, Nakashima announced that she and Shimizu would be divorcing. They separated on amicable terms, both expressing the sentiment that their time together was "irreplaceable" and that they would remain friends.

== Discography ==
Studio albums

- True (2002)
- Love (2003)
- Music (2005)
- The End (2006)
- Yes (2007)
- Voice (2008)
- Star (2010)
- Real (2013)
- Tough (2017)
- Joker (2020)
- I (2022)
- Stage: The Musical in My Head (2026)

== Filmography ==
=== Movies ===
Title	Year	Role	Notes
Guuzen ni mo Saiaku na Shounen	2003	Yumiko	Main Role
Namahoso wa Tomaranai	2003	herself	cameo, TV Asahi TV Movie
Nana	2005	Nana Ôsaki	Main Role
Nana 2	2006	Nana Ôsaki	Main Role
Resident Evil: Afterlife	2010	patient zero	
Resident Evil: Retribution	2012	patient zero	
Sanbun no ichi	2014	Maria	Support Role

=== Dramas ===
Title	Year	Role	Network	Notes
Kizudarake no Love Song	2001	Shimazaki Miki	Fuji TV	Support Role
Shiritsu Tantei Hama Mike	2002		NTV	Support Role
Ryūsei no Kizuna	2008	Sagi	TBS	Support Role
Unubore Deka	2010	Higurashi Rie	TBS	Support Role
Omotesandô Kôkô Gasshôbu!	2015	Kamishima Kana	TBS	Guest Role, Episode 8, TV Mini-Series
Jikô keisatsu	2019	Chikako Orihara	TV Asahi	Guest Role, Episode 4, TV Mini-Series
Followers	2020	Sayo	Netflix	Support Role, Webseries

Preceded by W-inds	Japan Record Award for Best New Artist; 2002	Succeeded by Yo Hitoto
