= Mika Nakashima discography =

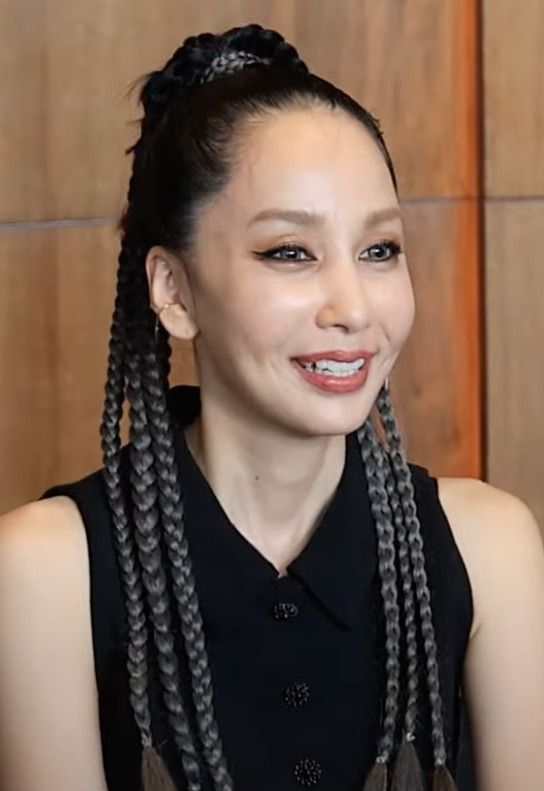
- Nakashima in 2023
- Studio albums: 12
- Extended plays: 2
- Live albums: 2
- Compilation albums: 7
- Singles: 45
- Video albums: 20

The discography of Mika Nakashima includes 12 studio albums, 7 compilation albums, 45 singles and 20 video albums. These have all been released through Sony Music Entertainment Japan.

== Albums ==
=== Studio albums ===
List of studio albums, with selected chart positions
Title	Album details	Peak positions					Sales	Certifications
Title	Album details	JPN	KOR (Note: The Gaon Album Chart was established in 2010.)	KOR Intl. (Note: Week references for Gaon: Star, Real, Zutto Suki Datta, Tears and Dears.)	TWN (Note: The G-Music chart was established in July 2005 and only archives the top 20 releases.)	TWN East Asia (Note: Positions were taken from 2005 week 26 and 29, 2006 week 50, 2007 week 12, 2008 week 48, 2010 week 44, 2013 week 5, 2014 week 48, 2019 week 3.)	Sales	Certifications
True	Released: August 28, 2002; Label: Sony; Formats: CD, vinyl, digital download	1	—	—	—	—	JPN: 1,172,000	RIAJ: Million (Note: True later received a 3× Platinum certification for 1,200,000 copies, but the 3× Platinum threshold was changed to 750,000 copies in 2003.)
Love	Released: November 6, 2003; Label: Sony; Formats: CD, vinyl, digital download	1	—	—	—	1	JPN: 1,411,000	RIAJ: Million
Music	Released: March 9, 2005; Label: Sony; Formats: CD, vinyl, digital download	1	—	—	—	1	JPN: 546,000; KOR: 9,000	RIAJ: 2× Platinum
The End	Released: December 13, 2006; Label: Sony; Formats: CD, vinyl, digital download	2	—	—	—	2	JPN: 182,000	RIAJ: Platinum
Yes	Released: March 14, 2007; Label: Sony; Formats: CD, vinyl, digital download	3	—	—	10	3	JPN: 296,000	RIAJ: Platinum
Voice	Released: November 26, 2008; Label: Sony; Formats: CD, CD+DVD, digital download	1	—	—	13	3	JPN: 343,000	RIAJ: Platinum
Star	Released: October 27, 2010; Label: Sony; Formats: CD, CD+DVD, digital download	1	16	3	—	6	JPN: 180,000	RIAJ: Gold
Real	Released: January 30, 2013; Label: Sony; Formats: CD, CD+DVD, digital download	1	21	6	—	2	JPN: 89,000	RIAJ: Gold
Tough	Released: March 22, 2017; Label: Sony; Formats: CD, CD+DVD, digital download	8	—	—	—	—	JPN: 18,000	
Joker	Released: October 7, 2020; Label: Sony; Formats: CD, CD+DVD, digital download	17	—	—	—	—	JPN: 8,000	
I	Released: May 4, 2022; Label: Sony; Formats: CD, digital download	6	—	—	—	—	JPN: 5,000	
Stage: The Musical in My Head	Released: January 28, 2026; Label: Sony; Formats: CD, digital download	24	—	—	—	—	JPN: 2,082	

=== Compilation albums ===
List of compilation albums, with selected chart positions
Title	Album details	Peak positions					Sales	Certifications
Title	Album details	JPN	KOR	KOR Intl.	TWN (Note: Positions were taken from 2005 week 50, 2009 week 11.)	TWN East Asia	Sales	Certifications
Best	Released: December 4, 2005; Label: Sony; Formats: CD, vinyl, Blu-spec CD, download	1	—	—	3	1	JPN: 1,209,000	RIAJ: Million
No More Rules	Released: March 4, 2009; Label: Sony; Formats: CD, digital download	5	—	—	7	1	JPN: 56,000	
Dears	Released: November 5, 2014; Label: Sony; Formats: 2CD, 2CD/DVD, digital download	5	100	54	—	10	JPN: 59,000	
Tears	Released: November 5, 2014; Label: Sony; Formats: 2CD, 2CD/DVD, digital download	4	90	53	—	—	JPN: 76,000	RIAJ: Gold
Yuki no Hana 15 Shuunen Kinen Best-ban Bible	Released: January 30, 2019; Label: Sony Music Entertainment Japan; Formats: 3CD, 3CD/DVD/BD, digital download	6	—	—	—	1		
With	Released: December 2, 2020; Label: Sony Music Associated Records; Formats: CD, digital download	41	—	—	—	—	JPN: 2,000	

=== Cover albums ===
List of cover albums, with selected chart positions
Title	Album details	Peak positions			Sales
Title	Album details	JPN	KOR	KOR Intl.	Sales
Zutto Suki Datta: All My Covers (ずっと好きだった)	Released: March 12, 2014; Label: Sony; Formats: CD, CD+DVD, digital download	7	52	12	JPN: 27,000
Roots – Piano & Voice	Released: August 9, 2017; Label: Sony; Formats: CD, CD+DVD, digital download	21	—	—	
M25	Released: November 4, 2026; Label: Sony; Formats: CD, digital download	38	—	—	JPN: 1,017

=== Remix albums ===
List of remix albums, with selected chart positions
Title	Album details	Peak positions	Sales
Title	Album details	JPN	Sales
Relaxin'	Released: March 3, 2015; Label: Sony; Formats: CD, CD/DVD, digital download	18	JPN: 9,000

=== Acoustic albums ===
List of acoustic albums, with selected chart positions
Title	Album details	Peak positions	
Title	Album details	JPN	TWN East Asia
Portrait – Piano & Voice	Released: November 7, 2018; Label: Sony; Formats: CD, CD+DVD, digital download	29	1

=== Live albums ===
List of live albums, with selected chart positions
Title	Album details	Peak positions	Sales
Title	Album details	JPN	Sales
Official Bootleg Live at Shinjuku Loft (Note: Released as Mika Ranmaru, a four member band also featuring Kohey Tsuchiya on guitar, Jyunji Ikehata on drums and Takashi Ebinuma on bass.)	Released: January 27, 2016; Label: Sony; Formats: CD, digital download	38	JPN: 3,000
MTV Unplugged	Released: March 30, 2016; Label: Sony; Formats: CD, CD/DVD, CD/Blu-ray, digital download	—	

== Extended plays ==
List of extended plays, with selected chart positions
Title	Album details	Peak positions	Sales	Certifications
Title	Album details	JPN	Sales	Certifications
Resistance	Released: November 7, 2002; Label: Sony; Formats: CD, vinyl, digital download	1	JPN: 200,000	RIAJ: Gold
Oborozukiyo: Inori	Released: September 15, 2004; Label: Sony; Formats: CD, vinyl, digital download	3	JPN: 112,000	RIAJ: Gold

== Singles ==
=== As a lead artist ===
List of singles, with selected chart positions
Title	Year	Peak chart positions					Sales	Certifications	Album
Title	Year	JPN	JPN Hot 100 (Note: The Japan Hot 100 was established in February 2008.)	KOR	KOR Intl. (Note: Week references for Gaon: "Always", "Ichiban Kirai na Watashi o", "Dear", "Ashita Sekai ga Owaru nara", "Hatsukoi", "Ai Kotoba", "Boku ga Shinō to Omotta no wa".)	TWN East Asia (Note: Positions were taken from 2008 weeks 31 and 46, 2009 weeks 20 and 45, 2010 week 4, 2011 weeks 18 and 38, 2013 week 51, 2014 week 27, 41 and 49.)	Sales	Certifications	Album
"Stars"	2001	3	—	—	—	—	469,000	RIAJ (physical): Platinum; RIAJ (download): Gold	True
"Crescent Moon"	2002	4	—	—	—	—	99,000		True
"One Survive"	2002	8	—	—	—	—	87,000		True
"Helpless Rain"	2002	8	—	—	—	—	83,000		True
"Will"	2002	3	—	—	—	—	145,000	RIAJ (physical): Gold; RIAJ (download): Gold	True
"Aishiteru"	2003	4	—	—	—	—	105,000	RIAJ (physical): Gold	Love
"Love Addict"	2003	5	—	—	—	—	69,000	RIAJ (physical): Gold	Love
"Seppun"	2003	4	—	—	—	—	38,000		Love
"Find the Way"	2003	4	—	—	—	—	124,000	RIAJ (download): Gold	Love
"Yuki no Hana"	2003	3	77 (Note: Charted in 2012.)	—	—	—	248,000	RIAJ (ringtone): Million; RIAJ (download): 3× Platinum; RIAJ (physical): Platinum; RIAJ (streaming): Gold	Love
"Seven"	2004	3	—	—	—	—	53,000	RIAJ (physical): Gold	Music
"Hi no Tori"	2004	9	—	—	—	—	40,000	RIAJ (physical): Gold	Music
"Legend"	2004	5	—	—	—	—	68,000	RIAJ (physical): Gold	Music
"Sakurairo Mau Koro"	2005	5	73 (Note: Charted in 2010.)	—	—	—	106,000	RIAJ (ringtone): 2× Platinum; RIAJ (download): Platinum; RIAJ (physical): Gold	Music
"Hitori"	2005	15	—	—	—	—	26,000		Music
"Glamorous Sky" (Note: As Nana starring Mika Nakashima.)	2005	1	—	—	—	—	445,000	RIAJ (ringtone): Million; RIAJ (cellphone): 2× Platinum; RIAJ (physical): 2× Platinum; RIAJ (PC): Gold	Best
"Cry No More"	2006	8	—	—	—	—	37,000	RIAJ (physical): Gold	Yes
"All Hands Together"	2006	8	—	—	—	—	35,000		Yes
"My Sugar Cat"	2006	14	—	—	—	—	19,000		Yes
"Hitoiro"	2006	5	—	—	—	—	97,000	RIAJ (ringtone): 2× Platinum; RIAJ (cellphone): Platinum; RIAJ (physical): Gold	The End
"Mienai Hoshi"	2007	4	—	—	—	—	61,000	RIAJ (cellphone): Platinum; RIAJ (physical): Gold	Yes
"Sunao na Mama"	2007	18	—	—	—	—	14,000	RIAJ (cellphone): Gold	Yes
"Life"	2007	3	—	—	—	—	139,000	RIAJ (ringtone): 2× Platinum; RIAJ (download): 3× Platinum (Note: The ballad version also separately certified Gold for cellphone downloads.); RIAJ (physical): Gold	Voice
"Eien no Uta"	2007	5	—	—	—	—	24,000		Voice
"Sakura (Hanagasumi)"	2008	12	7	—	—	—	24,000		Voice
"I Don't Know" (Note: As Mica 3 Chu, a collaboration with Morisanchū.)	2008	11	11	—	—	6	18,000		Voice
"Orion"	2008	6	5	—	—	6	63,000	RIAJ (download): Million; RIAJ (ringtone): 3× Platinum; RIAJ (physical): Gold; RIAJ (streaming): Gold	Voice
"Over Load"	2009	8	6	—	—	7	26,000	RIAJ (cellphone): Gold	Star
"Candy Girl"	2009	4	13	—	—	7	24,000		Star
"Nagareboshi"	2009	10	9	—	—	14	18,000	RIAJ (cellphone): Gold	Star
"Always"	2010	3	2	64	13	5	44,000	RIAJ (cellphone): Platinum	Star
"Ichiban Kirei na Watashi o"	2010	10	10	82	22	—	38,000	RIAJ (cellphone): Platinum	Star
"Dear"	2011	8	11	41	12	18	28,000	RIAJ (cellphone): Platinum	Real
"Love Is Ecstasy"	2011	8	9	—	—	18	17,000		Real
"Ashita Sekai ga Owaru nara"	2012	9	20	—	30	—	18,000	RIAJ (download): Gold	Real
"Hatsukoi"	2012	14	13	—	19	6	13,000		Real
"Ai Kotoba"	2013	17	20	—	31	—	15,000		Tough
"Boku ga Shinō to Omotta no wa"	2013	17	50	—	39	10	10,000		Tough
"Fighter" (with Miliyah Kato)	2014	13	19	—	—	16	10,000		Tough
"Gift" (with Miliyah Kato)	2014	13	—	—	—	16	10,000		Tough
"Hanataba"	2015	30	22	—	—	—	9,800		Tough
"Forget Me Not"	2016	33	32	—	—	—	4,000		Tough
"Koi o Suru"	2017	43	77	—	—	—	3,000		Tough
"A or B"	2017	38	—	—	—	—	2,000		Joker
"Kiss of Death" (produced by Hyde)	2018	17	27	—	—	—	15,500		Joker
"Sairen"	2018	—	— (Note: "Sairen" did not enter the Billboard Japan Hot 100, but peaked at number 44 on the Download Songs component chart.)	—	—	—			Joker
"Innocent Rouge" (Note: As Marie starring Mika Nakashima.)	2020	43	— (Note: "Innocent Rouge" did not enter the Billboard Japan Hot 100, but peaked at number 46 on the Top Singles Sales chart.)	—	—	—	1,600		With
"Mafuyu no Harmony" (with Ryota Fujimaki)	2020	—	— (Note: "Mafuyu no Harmony" did not enter the Billboard Japan Hot 100, but peaked at number 69 on the Download Songs component chart.)	—	—	—			With
"Symphonia"	2021	28	—	—	—	—	2,400		TBA
"Shiritai Koto, Shiritakunai Koto"	2021	28	—	—	—	—	2,400		TBA
"Yuki no Hana" (from The First Take)	2021	—	—	—	—	—			Message: Piano & Voice
"Boku ga Shinō to Omotta no wa" (from The First Take)	2021	—	—	—	—	—			Message: Piano & Voice
"Wish"	2022	23	— (Note: "Wish" did not enter the Billboard Japan Hot 100, but peaked at number 21 on the Top Singles Sales chart, and at 95 on the Download Songs chart.)	—	—	—	1,700		TBA
"Beyond"	2023	26	— (Note: "Beyond" did not enter the Billboard Japan Hot 100, but peaked at number 79 on the Download Songs component chart.)	—	—	—	2,200		TBA
"Shinjite" (with Ensemble)	2023	—	—	—	—	—			Non-album single
"Orion" (with Ensemble)	2023	—	—	—	—	—			Non-album single
"We Are All Stars"	2023	—	—	—	—	—			TBA
"Bōkyō"	2024	—	— (Note: "Bōkyō" did not enter the Billboard Japan Hot 100, but peaked at number 15 on the Download Songs component chart.)	—	—	—			TBA
"Mission"	2024	24	— (Note: "Mission" did not enter the Billboard Japan Hot 100, but peaked at number 27 on the Top Singles Sales chart.)	—	—	—	900		TBA
"Unfair"	2024	30	— (Note: "Unfair" did not enter the Billboard Japan Hot 100, but peaked at number 30 on the Top Singles Sales chart.)	—	—	—	1,000		TBA
"Hikari"	2026	49	— (Note: "Hikari" did not enter the Billboard Japan Hot 100, but peaked at number 45 on the Top Singles Sales chart.)	—	—	—	500		TBA
"Inori, Owareba"	2026	45	— (Note: "Inori, Owareba" did not enter the Billboard Japan Hot 100, but peaked at number 24 on the Download Songs chart.)	—	—	—	1,000		TBA

=== As a featured artist ===
List of singles as a featured artist, with selected chart positions
Title	Year	Peak chart positions		Sales	Album
Title	Year	JPN	JPN Hot	Sales	Album
"Music Flower" (Kohey Tsuchiya featuring Tomiko Van, Maki Ohguro, Mika Nakashima, Rinko Urashima, Nadia Shimazu, Katteni-Shiyagare and DJ Hasebe)	2008	115	—	600	Get Stoned
"Memory" (Daishi Dance featuring Mika Nakashima)	2009	—	56		Spectacle / Star
"Geta o Nerashite September" (下駄を鳴らしてセプテンバー; "Geta-sounding September") (Love Jiryō featuring Mika Nakashima)	2014	—	—		Ofuro wa Nurume no Katsujirō
"Birkaze Swimming School " (ビルカゼスイミングスクール) (SALU featuring Mika Nakashima)	2016	—	—		Good Morning
"Happy Life" (Salyu × Mika Nakashima)	2017	—	—		JOKER

=== Promotional singles ===
Title	Year	Peak chart positions	Certifications	Album
Title	Year	JPN Hot	Certifications	Album
"Resistance"	2002	—	RIAJ (cellphone): Gold	Resistance / Love
"Heaven on Earth"	2002	—		Resistance
"Oborozukiyo (Inori)"	2004	—		Oborozukiyo: Inori / Music
"Fake"	2004	—		Music
"Amazing Grace ('05)"	2005	—		Best
"Game"	2009	—		No More Rules
"Be Real"	2013	59		Real
"Ai no Uta" (愛の歌; "Love Song")	2015	67		"Hanataba" (single)

== Video albums ==
=== Music video collections ===
List of media, with selected chart positions
Title	Album details	Peak positions
Title	Album details	JPN DVD
Film Lotus	Released: March 27, 2002; Label: Sony; Formats: DVD, VHS	9
Film Lotus II	Released: March 5, 2003; Label: Sony; Formats: DVD, VHS	11
Film Lotus III	Released: December 3, 2003; Label: Sony; Formats: DVD	14
Film Lotus IV	Released: March 24, 2005; Label: Sony; Formats: DVD, UMD Video	18
Best	Released: December 28, 2005; Label: Sony; Formats: DVD	7
Film Lotus V: Southern Comfort 2006	Released: September 6, 2006; Label: Sony; Formats: DVD	38
Film Lotus VI	Released: August 22, 2007; Label: Sony; Formats: DVD	35
Film Lotus VII	Released: March 25, 2009; Label: Sony; Formats: DVD	75
Film Lotus VIII	Released: January 11, 2012; Label: Sony; Formats: DVD	33
Greatest Lotus	Released: March 28, 2012; Label: Sony; Formats: DVD	11
Film Lotus IX	Released: July 11, 2016; Label: Sony; Formats: DVD	58

=== Live concerts ===
List of media, with selected chart positions
Title	Album details	Peak positions	
Title	Album details	JPN DVD	JPN Blu-ray
The First Tour 2003 Live & Document	Released: May 2, 2003; Label: Sony; Formats: DVD, VHS	8	—
Mika Nakashima Concert Tour 2004 "Love" Final	Released: August 25, 2004; Label: Sony; Formats: DVD	13	—
Mika Nakashima Let's Music Tour 2005	Released: November 9, 2005; Label: Sony; Formats: DVD, UMD Video, Blu-ray	4	—
Mika Nakashima Concert Tour 2007 Yes My Joy	Released: November 7, 2007; Label: Sony; Formats: DVD, Blu-ray	13	—
Mika Nakashima Concert Tour 2009 Trust Our Voice	Released: December 2, 2009; Label: Sony; Formats: DVD, Blu-ray	11	—
Mika Nakashima Concert Tour 2011 The Only Star	Released: February 29, 2012; Label: Sony; Formats: DVD, Blu-ray	17	28
Mika Nakashima Live Is "Real" 2013: The Letter Anata ni Tsutaetakute (あなたに伝えたくて; "Wanting to Be Heard By You")	Released: November 27, 2013; Label: Sony; Formats: DVD, Blu-ray	19	35
Mika Nakashima Concert Tour 2015 "The Best" Dears & Tears	Released: September 20, 2015; Label: Sony; Formats: DVD, Blu-ray	26	45
GREATEST LIVE ～LIVE BEST SELECTION 2003～2017～	Released: April 30, 2018; Label: Sony; Formats: DVD, Blu-ray	26	37
MIKA NAKASHIMA PREMIUM LIVE TOUR 2019 IN OSAKA	Released: March 25, 2020; Label: Sony; Formats: DVD, Blu-ray	40	75

=== Documentaries ===
List of media, with selected chart positions
Title	Album details	Peak positions
Title	Album details	JPN DVD
Kiseki: The Document of a Star	Released: December 18, 2002; Label: Sony; Formats: DVD, VHS	37

== Other appearances ==
List of non-studio album or guest appearances that feature Mika Nakashima
Title	Year	Album	Notes
"Helpless Game" (Heartsdales featuring Mika Nakashima)	2002	Radioactive	Alternative version of Nakashima's single "Helpless Rain."
"Helpless Game (Play It on the Radio Mix)" (Heartsdales featuring Mika Nakashima)	2002	"Body Rock" (single)	Alternative version of Nakashima's single "Helpless Rain."
"Let's Get Together Now" (Daisuke Kawaguchi featuring Mika Nakashima)	2003	Before the Dawn	
"Helpless Game (Yoru no Famiresu Remix)" (夜のファミレス; "Night-time Family Restaurant") (Heartsdales featuring Mika Nakashima)	2004	Heart Attack! The Remixes & Video Clips	
"Find the Way (TV Mix)"	2004	Mobile Suit Gundam Seed: Original Soundtrack IV	
"Glamorous Sky (Soundtrack Version)"	2005	Nana Original Soundtrack	
"Hitoiro (Altanative Edit, Soundtrack Version)"	2006	Nana 2 Original Soundtrack	
"Dare Yori mo" (誰よりも; "More than Anyone Else") (Dohzi-T featuring Mika Nakashima)	2014	T's Music	
"Yasashii Kiss wo Shite" (やさしいキスをして; "Kind Kisses")	2014	Watashi to Drecom -DREAMS COME TRUE 25th ANNIVERSARY BEST COVERS-	cover of Dreams Come True song
"Lipstick" (リップスティック)	2020	Inspire	cover of Miliyah Kato song
