= Best (Mika Nakashima album) =

Greatest hits album by Mika Nakashima
- Released: 2005-12-07
- Genre: J-pop, jazz, pop, easy listening, rock
- Length: 1:14:22
- Label: Sony Music Associated Records

Mika Nakashima chronology
Music (2005)	Best (2005)	The End (2006)

Best is the first Japanese compilation album and sixth overall album release by Mika Nakashima. It contains 14 songs. Two new re-recordings were made: one of her first single, 'Stars,' and the other of 'Amazing Grace (05),' the latter of which was included in a Suntory commercial for Freixnet Champagne and made as a radio-only single to promote the album in Japan.

A music video compilation, also called 'BEST,' was released in Japan and Southeast Asia in December 2005. It contains the music videos for all of Mika's first 18 singles – from 'Stars' to 'Glamorous Sky' – and the promotional videos for 'Amazing Grace (05)' and a previously unreleased live recording of the song 'Blood.'

Best debuted at #1 in the Japan Oricon 200 Album Chart when it was released, selling 480,097 copies in its first week – bettering the first-week sales of her first album, True. It was the #5 album of 2006.

Since its release, BEST has sold 1,204,996 copies. Therefore, BEST is the second best-selling album in Mika's career only to Love, outselling True by over 30,000 copies.

== Track listing ==
No.	Title	Lyrics	Music	Arranger(s)	Length
1.	"Amazing Grace" ('05)	John Newton	John Newton	Chie Ayado	4:07
2.	"Stars" (new vocal '05)	Yasushi Akimoto	Daisuke Kawaguchi	Keiichi Tomita	6:05
3.	"Crescent Moon"	Takashi Matsumoto	Hiroaki Ōno	Yoshito Tanaka	4:18
4.	"Will"	Yasushi Akimoto	Daisuke Kawaguchi	Keiichi Tomita	5:22
5.	"Resistance"	Yasushi Akimoto, Mika Nakashima	Seikou Nagaoka	Coldfeet	4:52
6.	"Aishiteru" (愛してる; I Love You)	H (three tight b)	H (three tight b)	shinya (three tight b)	5:30
7.	"Love Addict"	Mika Nakashima	Shinichi Osawa (Mondo Grosso)	Shinichi Osawa	7:13
8.	"Find the Way"	Mika Nakashima	Lori Fine (Coldfeet)	Ken Shima	5:26
9.	"Yuki no Hana" (雪の華; Snow flower)	Satomi	Ryouki Matsumoto	Ryouki Matsumoto	5:40
10.	"Seven"	Mika Nakashima	Lori Fine (Coldfeet)	Coldfeet	4:27
11.	"Oborozukiyo: Inori" (朧月夜～祈り; Night With a Hazy Moon ~Prayer)	Oborozukiyo Tatsuyuki Takano; Inori Mika Nakashima	Oborozukiyo Teiichi Okano; Inori Taro Hakase	Oborozukiyo Taro Hakase; Inori Taro Hakase	6:03
12.	"Legend"	Mika Nakashima	Yasunari Okano	Coldfeet	5:48
13.	"Sakurairo Mau Koro" (桜色舞うころ; When We Dance In the Cherryblossom's Color)	Minako Kawae	Minako Kawae	Satoshi Takebe	4:55
14.	"Glamorous Sky"	Ai Yazawa	Hyde	Hyde, K.A.Z	4:27

== Charts and sales ==
=== Oricon sales charts (Japan) ===
Release	Chart	Peak position	First week sales	Sales total
December 7, 2005	Oricon Daily Albums Chart	1		
December 7, 2005	Oricon Weekly Albums Chart	1	480,097	1,204,996
December 7, 2005	Oricon Monthly Albums Chart	1		
December 7, 2005	Oricon Yearly Albums Chart	6		
