= Music of the Drakengard series =

Music of the Drakengard video game series

The music for the Drakengard series, known as Drag-On Dragoon (ドラッグ オン ドラグーン, Doraggu on doragūn; commonly abbreviated as DOD) in Japan, has been handled by multiple composers since the release of the original game in 2004. Drakengard's composers were Nobuyoshi Sano and Takayuki Aihara, Drakengard 2 was handled by Ryoki Matsumoto and Aoi Yoshiki, and Drakengard 3 was composed for by Keiichi Okabe, the composer for series spin-off Nier. Sano remained as a sound director for the second game, and his music was used as a reference for the third. Multiple albums have been released for the music of the series: Drag-On Dragoon Original Soundtrack Vol.1 and Vol.2 were released on October and November 2004, while a two-disc re-release titled Drag-On Dragoon Original Soundtrack was released in April 2011. The Drag-On Dragoon 2 Original Soundtrack was released on July 20, 2005. A promotional disc with two tracks from the soundtrack was released in the same year. The official soundtrack for the third game, Drag-On Dragoon 3 Original Soundtrack, was released January 21, 2014. A compilation of chiptune remixes of the previous games and Nier, Drag-On Dragoon Chips Music, was released on December 19, 2013 as part of the Drag-On Dragoon 10 Anniversary Box.

The series has also received theme songs from multiple Japanese pop artists, all of which have been released as singles. A re-orchestration of Mika Nakashima's single "Hitori" was used as the theme for Drakengard 2, incorporating elements from the game. Two theme songs were written for Drakengard 3: "Kuroi Uta" and "This Silence is Mine". The former was sung by Eir Aoi, a fan of the series, and written by Nier writer Kikuchi Hana. The latter was specially written and sung by Onitsuka Chihiro, who created the song around the themes and characters of the game. Both songs were composed by Okabe. All three singles have been in the top 40 best-selling singles in the Japanese Oricon music charts.

The soundtracks have received mixed to positive reviews from both dedicated video game music outlets and video game critics. The first game was noted for its disturbing style, which both drew criticism for repetitiveness and praise for suiting the game's atmosphere. It has been generally cited as an experimental soundtrack. The second game's soundtrack received a more positive reception, with the general opinion being that it was a more traditional and consequently more comfortable soundtrack. The third game's soundtrack also received fairly positive comments, mainly praising its quality, although critiques were made concerning its variety. The chiptune compilation was generally liked, except for its exclusivity to the special release. The singles have also received praise.

== Creation and influence ==
The music of the first game in the Drakengard series was composed by Nobuyoshi Sano and Takayuki Aihara. In creating the score, they sampled excerpts from pieces of classical music (selected by Aihara), then rearranged, remixed and layered them in various ways. Their main objective was to create music that emulated the game's hack-and-slash gameplay, as well as the dark story and general narrative theme of "madness". The music was intended to be "experimental" and "expressionistic" rather than "commercial". After being composed, all the tracks were performed by a full orchestra. The team who worked on the music also worked on the Tekken series, and they sought to emulate the music of Northern Europe. One of the soundtracks that inspired Sano and Aihara in their work was the score for The Exorcist. The theme song, "Exhausted" (尽きる, Tsukiru), was composed by Sano, written by the game's scenario writer Sawako Natori and sung by Eriko Hatsune.

Drakengard 2's soundtrack was composed by Ryoki Matsumoto and Aoi Yoshiki, with supervision by Sano, who acted as sound director. The CGI cutscenes were scored by Masashi Yano. Due to widespread criticisms of his work on the first game, Sano was asked by the game's producer, Takamasa Shiba, to bring in outside help for the second game's soundtrack, which upset Sano to a degree. Shiba wanted a composer less linked to video games to compose the music: Matsumoto was brought in because of his work on the non-video-game J-pop songs "Yuki no Hana" and "Tsuki no Shizuku". Because of the size of the project, Matsumoto in turn brought in his friend Yoshiki to help. The soundtrack was designed a fusion of J-pop and video game music, and to evoke the emotions of the various characters and the feeling of battle. The theme song for the game's English release was "Growing Wings", a localized version of the first game's theme song sung by Kari Wahlgren.

The third game's soundtrack was created by music studio Monaca, which had also created the score for Nier, a series spin-off. The music was composed and arranged by Keiichi Okabe, Keigo Hoashi, Sho Ishihama and Kuniyuki Takahashi, with additional tracks composed and arranged by Akitaka Tohyama. Further arrangements were handled by Takanori Goto, while song lyrics were written by Hana Kikuchi. Vocals were provided by Emi Evans and Nami Nakagawa. While writing the music, Okabe felt he needed to match Sano's work on Drakengard rather than copy it, and so felt that there was no need to "rehash" the original music despite the potential merits. He commented that the musical creation was "a tough production, but for this game, there's part of it I'm doing that I've never experienced before." At director Yoko Taro's request, Okabe worked on separating the style of the music from that of Nier: he did this by including both soft, gentle tunes similar to Nier and more intense tracks. The two styles were also inspired by the game's world theme of "the sense of contrast". One musical piece, "Exhausted 3", is a re-orchestration of Drakengard's theme song, intended by Okabe as a nod to earlier installments while staying true to Yoko's wishes. "Exhausted 3" was composed arranged by Sano, with lyrics by Natori and Kikuchi, and was performed by Maaya Uchida.

== Albums ==
=== Drag-On Dragoon Original Soundtrack ===
Drag-On Dragoon Original Soundtrack

Soundtrack album by Nobuyoshi Sano & Takayuki Aihara
- Released: October 22, 2003 (Vol.1); November 21, 2003 (Vol.2); April 20, 2011 (Re-release)
- Length: 1:03:14 (Vol.1/Disc 1); 1:15:50 (Vol.2/Disc 2)
- Label: Marvelous Entertainment
- Producer: Square Enix

Music from Drag-on Dragoon has been released in several albums. The soundtrack was originally released in two volumes under the names Drag-On Dragoon Original Soundtrack Vol.1 and Vol.2, released on October 22 and November 21, 2003 respectively. The soundtrack was re-released on April 20, 2011 as a two-disc set under the title Drag-On Dragoon Original Soundtrack. The re-release reached #57 in the Japanese Oricon music charts and remained in the charts for two weeks.

The individual albums received a mixed response from critics. The reviewer for RPGFan was weakly positive about the first album, calling it "extremely experimental" and stating that people needed to be open-minded while listening, while also citing it as better than the soundtrack for Xenosaga Episode I: Der Wille zur Macht. The reviewer echoed most of these sentiments for the second album, while also stating that it contained the better musical pieces from the game of the two albums. Luc Nadeau of Game Music Online, who reviewed all three releases of the soundtrack, was mixed to positive in his opinions. He generally liked the music, but noted, like the RPGFan reviewer, that it was highly experimental and would not be to everyone's taste. He also cited his preference for the 2011 two-disc re-release over the original albums. Reviewing the re-release, Jayson Napolitano of Original Sound Version called it "one of the most experimental and disturbing soundtracks I've heard in a while". He praised the soundtrack despite not finding it memorable, and commented that he found it more appealing when he knew some of the plot details that were censored in the game's western release.

Reviewers of the game itself also noted the soundtrack. Greg Kasavin of GameSpot mentioned it as the most distinctive aspect of the game, stating that it was "the most nerve-racking and most intense aspect of [Drakengard]". Adam Jarvis of VideoGamer.com was also positive, calling the soundtrack "haunting" and saying that it "helps create a suitably dark atmosphere". IGN's Jeremy Dunham was both impressed by the atmosphere of the tracks and critical of multiple instances of grueling repetition, summing the music up as "disappointing".

Drag-On Dragoon Original Soundtrack Vol.1 (disc 1)
No.	Title	Music	Length
1.	"Mission Selection" (ミッション選択)	Nobuyoshi Sano	0:25
2.	"Weapon Selection" (武器選択)	Takayuki Aihara	1:14
3.	"First Chapter - In the Sky" (第一章上空)	Takayuki Aihara	2:56
4.	"First Chapter - On the Ground" (第一章地上)	Takayuki Aihara	2:24
5.	"First Chapter - Inside the Castle" (第一章城内)	Takayuki Aihara	2:57
6.	"Second Chapter - In the Sky" (第二章上空)	Takayuki Aihara	3:12
7.	"Second Chapter - On the Ground" (第二章地上)	Takayuki Aihara	2:44
8.	"Third Chapter - In the Sky" (第三章上空)	Takayuki Aihara	3:11
9.	"Third Chapter - On the Ground" (第三章地上)	Takayuki Aihara	2:35
10.	"Fourth Chapter - In the Sky" (第四章上空)	Nobuyoshi Sano	3:19
11.	"Fourth Chapter - On the Ground" (第四章地上)	Nobuyoshi Sano	3:28
12.	"Fifth Chapter - In the Sky 1" (第五章上空、一)	Takayuki Aihara	3:26
13.	"Fifth Chapter - On the Ground 1" (第五章地上、一)	Takayuki Aihara	3:16
14.	"Fifth Chapter - In the Sky 2" (第五章上空、二)	Takayuki Aihara	3:47
15.	"Fifth Chapter - On the Ground 2" (第五章地上、二)	Takayuki Aihara	3:13
16.	"Sixth Chapter - In the Sky" (第六章上空)	Takayuki Aihara	3:15
17.	"Sixth Chapter - On the Ground" (第六章地上)	Takayuki Aihara	2:57
18.	"Seventh Chapter - In the Sky" (第七章上空)	Nobuyoshi Sano	3:47
19.	"Eighth Chapter - In the Sky" (第八章上空)	Nobuyoshi Sano	3:16
20.	"Eighth Chapter - On the Ground" (第八章地上)	Nobuyoshi Sano	3:31
21.	"Eighth Chapter - Closing" (第八章最終)	Nobuyoshi Sano	2:53
22.	"Mission Clear" (ミッションクリア)	Nobuyoshi Sano	0:36
23.	"Game Over ~Continue~" (ゲームオーバー～コンティニュー～)	Nobuyoshi Sano	0:52

Drag-On Dragoon Original Soundtrack Vol.2 (disc 2)
No.	Title	Music	Length
1.	"Hungry Leonard - In the Sky" (レオナールの飢、上空)	Takayuki Aihara	3:28
2.	"Hungry Leonard - On the Ground" (レオナールの飢、地上)	Takayuki Aihara	3:17
3.	"Extraordinary Arioch - In the Sky" (アリオーシュの奇、上空)	Takayuki Aihara	3:12
4.	"Extraordinary Arioch - On the Ground" (アリオーシュの奇、地上)	Takayuki Aihara	3:20
5.	"Seere's Prayer - In the Sky" (セエレの祈、上空)	Takayuki Aihara	4:12
6.	"Seere's Prayer - On the Ground" (セエレの祈、地上)	Takayuki Aihara	2:37
7.	"Ninth Chapter - In the Sky 1" (第九章上空、一)	Takayuki Aihara	3:12
8.	""Ninth Chapter - In the Sky 2" (第九章上空、二)	Takayuki Aihara	3:07
9.	"Ninth Chapter - Closing" (第九章最終)	Takayuki Aihara	3:04
10.	"Tenth Chapter - In the Sky" (第十章上空)	Nobuyoshi Sano	3:06
11.	"Tenth Chapter - On the Ground" (第十章地上)	Nobuyoshi Sano	3:27
12.	"Eleventh Chapter - On the Ground 1" (第十一章地上、一)	Takayuki Aihara	2:59
13.	"Eleventh Chapter - On the Ground 2" (第十一章地上、二)	Takayuki Aihara	3:13
14.	"Twelfth Chapter - In the Sky" (第十二章上空)	Nobuyoshi Sano	3:29
15.	"Twelfth Chapter - On the Ground" (第十二章地上)	Nobuyoshi Sano	2:57
16.	"Twelfth Chapter - Closing" (第十二章最終)	Nobuyoshi Sano	3:20
17.	"Thirteenth Chapter - Closing" (第十三章最終)	Nobuyoshi Sano	2:31
18.	"Route A Staff Roll" (Ａ路スタッフロール)	Nobuyoshi Sano	2:43
19.	"Route B Staff Roll 'Exhausted'" (Ｂ路スタッフロール「尽きる」)	Nobuyoshi Sano & Eriko Hatsune	4:05
20.	"Route C Staff Roll" (Ｃ路スタッフロール)	Takayuki Aihara	3:48
21.	"Route D Staff Roll" (Ｄ路スタッフロール)	Nobuyoshi Sano	3:25
22.	"Route E Staff Roll" (Ｅ路スタッフロール)	Nobuyoshi Sano	3:37
23.	"Eleventh Chapter - In the Sky (Unpublished)" (第十一章上空（未使用）)	Takayuki Aihara	2:49
24.	"Twelfth Chapter - Closing (Unpublished)" (第十二章（未使用）)	Nobuyoshi Sano	0:52

=== Drag-On Dragoon 2 Original Soundtrack ===
Drag-On Dragoon 2 Original Soundtrack

Soundtrack album by Ryoki Matsumoto, Aoi Yoshiki & Nobuyoshi Sano
- Released: July 20, 2005
- Length: 1:13:03
- Label: Square Enix
- Producer: Sony Music Associated Records

Unlike Drakengard, Drakengard 2 has only had one soundtrack album released. Drag-On Dragoon 2 Original Soundtrack was released on July 20, 2005 under the catalog number AICL-1628. It consists of 22 tracks lasting 1:13:03. It contains the tracks used during gameplay and not those used during cutscenes, but does include the game's theme song, "Hitori", which was also released as a separate single. Two tracks from the game were released as a promotional CD for the game, both as a limited giveaway and part of press kits. It included concept art, interviews, and trailers.

The album has received very positive reviews. Chris Greening of Game Music Online praised the shift to a more classical style and the general intensity of multiple tracks, ending the review by applauding Yoshiki's hard work. Mike Wilson, writing for RPGFan, echoed many of these sentiments despite thinking that there were too few tracks on the album, giving the soundtrack ten out of ten. Both reviewers stated that it was an easier listening experience than the soundtrack for the first Drag-on Dragoon game. Game-OST's Simon Smith also praised it, calling the soundtrack "a complete attack on the senses as an entire orchestra and full sized choir rampage as much power and tension on you as possible."

Outside soundtrack reviews, opinions from reviews of the game itself have also been positive. IGN's Ed Lewis called the music "appropriately dramatic", though stated it was often drowned out by the ambient noise and voice acting. GameSpot's Greg Mueller called the music "varied and interesting", while stating that the vocal theme was "sappy, but it's used sparingly enough, so it doesn't get terribly annoying". The GameTrailers reviewer cited the score as "top-notch", referring to it as one of the few well-done aspects of the game.

Track list
No.	Title	Writer(s)	Japanese title	Length
1.	"Symphonic Poem "Forbidden Prelude""	Aoi Yoshiki	交響詩 「禁断の序曲」	3:48
2.	"Fate"	Yoshiki	運命	2:46
3.	"Plains of Pity"	Yoshiki	恵沢の平原	3:07
4.	"Reminiscence is Madness"	Yoshiki	追憶は狂気	3:09
5.	"Old Tombstone"	Yoshiki	古の墓標	3:14
6.	"Valley of Darkness"	Yoshiki	無明の渓谷	3:22
7.	"Black Requiem"	Yoshiki	黒のレクイエム	3:26
8.	"Formidable Enemy"	Yoshiki	強敵	3:08
9.	"Moaning Waterways"	Yoshiki	嘆きの水脈	3:25
10.	"Sadness"	Yoshiki	哀しみ	3:01
11.	""Exhausted" ~On the Holy Land~"	Nobuyoshi Sano	「尽きる」 〜聖地にて〜	3:40
12.	""Exhausted" ~The Broken Past~"	Sano	「尽きる」 〜壊れた過去〜	2:52
13.	"Abysmal Earth"	Yoshiki	深淵なる大地	3:15
14.	"Furious Earth"	Yoshiki	狂乱の大地	2:54
15.	"Twilight Hill"	Yoshiki	黄昏の丘	3:21
16.	"Decision's Fate"	Yoshiki	決着の果て	3:03
17.	"Impatience"	Yoshiki	焦燥	3:05
18.	"Exploration"	Yoshiki	探検	3:39
19.	"Breaking Through"	Yoshiki	突破	2:53
20.	"Unrest"	Yoshiki	不穏	3:14
21.	"Final Battle"	Yoshiki	最期の戦い	2:50
22.	"Alone"	Ryoki Matsumoto & Satomi	ひとり	5:51

=== Drag-On Dragoon 3 Original Soundtrack ===
Drag-On Dragoon 3 Original Soundtrack

Soundtrack album by Keiichi Okabe
- Released: January 21, 2014
- Length: 1:12:48 (disc 1); 1:09:06 (disc 2)
- Label: Square Enix
- Producer: Square Enix

Like the second game, there has only been one soundtrack album release for Drakengard 3. Drag-on Dragoon 3 Original Soundtrack was released on January 21, 2014 under the catalog number SQEX-10414~5. The game's two theme songs were released both as part of the soundtrack and as singles.

Christopher Huynh of Game Music Online generally praised the soundtrack's quality, but felt there was too little variety. RPGFan's Patrick Gann was generally positive, although he had little commentary on individual tracks, and recommended the album to people who had enjoyed the soundtrack of Nier. The album reached #18 in the Oricon charts and remained in the charts for four weeks.

Reviewers of the game have also praised the soundtrack. USGamer's Kat Bailey was fairly positive about it despite not finding it very memorable, calling it "aggressively anime, mixing piano riffs with the odd bit of J-Pop for emphasis". Chris Carter of Destructoid called the music "stupendous, and one of the best JRPG soundtracks I've heard in a long while." Andrew Barker, writing an analysis of the game for RPGFan, called the music "the backbone" of Drakengard 3. He also cited the music as being "universally praised" by critics.

Drag-On Dragoon 3 Original Soundtrack (disc 1)
No.	Title	Length
1.	"A Better End" (Better End)	2:31
2.	"Voidscape" (忘彼)	2:30
3.	"Thundervalor / Battleground" (勇雷／戦場)	4:43
4.	"Corroscience / Battleground" (侵贖／戦場)	3:45
5.	"Descendeus" (神降)	4:44
6.	"Antipurity / Battleground" (不情／戦場)	4:42
7.	"Blissade / Battleground" (踊祝／戦場)	4:37
8.	"Iniquitus" (偏罪)	3:03
9.	"Registance / Battleground" (応撃／戦場)	4:04
10.	"Prevolt / Battleground" (防来／戦場)	4:03
11.	"Aethervox" (空音)	3:59
12.	"Pulchregeist / Battleground" (奇霊／戦場)	3:59
13.	"Exvulsion / Battleground" (出蠢／戦場)	4:00
14.	"Strumble" (転歩)	3:17
15.	"Wilderblades / Battleground" (乱葉／戦場)	4:21
16.	"Companthem / Battleground" (友歌／戦場)	4:23
17.	"Nethernox" (底闇)	2:40
18.	"Exhaustion 3" (尽きる3)	4:11
19.	"Censorial Sonata" (倫理の為のピアノ曲)	3:12

Drag-On Dragoon 3 Original Soundtrack (disc 2)
No.	Title	Length
1.	"Kuroi Uta" (クロイウタ)	3:28
2.	"Exvulsion / Phanuel" (出蠢／ファヌエル)	4:10
3.	"Prevolt / Armaros" (防来／アルマロス)	3:33
4.	"Corroscience / Almisael" (侵贖／アルミサエル)	2:57
5.	"Blissade / Egregori" (踊祝/エグリゴリ)	5:07
6.	"Companthem / Gabriel" (友歌／ガブリエル)	4:03
7.	"Blissade / Raphael" (踊祝／ラファエル)	4:28
8.	"Companthem / Abdiel" (友歌／アブディエル)	4:15
9.	"Prevolt / Zophiel" (防来／ゾフィエル)	3:33
10.	"Exvulsion / Galgaliel" (出蠢／ガルガリエル)	4:56
11.	"Corroscience / Ezrael" (侵贖／イズライール)	4:35
12.	"Kuroi Uta (international version)" (クロイウタ／日本国外向け製品収録版)	6:05
13.	"The Final Song" (最後の歌)	7:56
14.	"This Silence is Mine"	7:06

=== Drag-On Dragoon Chips Music ===
Drag-On Dragoon Chips Music

Soundtrack album by Nobuyoshi Sano, Takayuki Aihara, Ryoki Matsumoto, Aoi Yoshiki & Keiichi Okabe
- Released: December 19, 2013
- Length: 1:13:03
- Label: Square Enix
- Producer: Square Enix

In addition to the soundtrack albums, a single compilation of music from across the series has been produced. Drag-On Dragoon Chips Music was released on December 19, 2013 under the catalog number TGCS-7750. The release consists of a selection of tracks from Drakengard (Sano, Aihara), Drakengard 2 (Aoi, Matsumoto) and Nier (Okabe) remixed as chiptunes. Also included is a version of "Exhausted" by Sano for the piano, used as background music for Drakengard 3's Japanese website. The compilation was exclusively released as part of the Drag-On Dragoon 10th Anniversary Box, featuring a copy of Drakengard 3 and multiple books and artwork relating to the series. The music was accompanied by images representative of scenes from the game where the selected music plays.

The compilation received mixed to positive opinions from music reviewers. Patrick Gann of RPGFan was generally positive about the remixes, especially those of tracks from Nier. Game Music Online's Christopher Huynh was a little less enthusiastic, saying that there were "some pieces working better than others but none that should be considered bad." His main complaint was that there was little creativity in the remixes. Both reviewers were pleased with the piano remix of "Exhausted", and both criticized its exclusivity to the special bundle.

Track list
No.	Title	Writer(s)	Japanese title	Length
1.	"Mission Selection"	Nobuyoshi Sano	ミッション選択	0:25
2.	"Weapon Selection"	Takayuki Aihara	武器選択	1:17
3.	"First Chapter - In the Sky"	Aihara	第一章上空	2:58
4.	"Fourth Chapter - On the Ground"	Sano	第四章地上	3:08
5.	"Mission Clear"	Sano	ミッションクリア	0:36
6.	"Seere's Prayer - In the Sky"	Aihara	セエレの祈、上空	4:12
7.	"Thirteenth Chapter - Closing"	Sano	第十三章 最終	2:30
8.	"Route B Staff Roll 'Exhausted'"	Aihara	Ｂ路スタッフロール「尽きる」	4:05
9.	"Symphonic Poem "Forbidden Prelude""	Aoi Yoshiki	交響詩 「禁断の序曲」	3:48
10.	"Fate"	Yoshiki	運命	2:46
11.	"Plains of Pity"	Yoshiki	恵沢の平原	3:07
12.	"Formidable Enemy"	Yoshiki	強敵	3:08
13.	"Moaning Waterways"	Yoshiki	嘆きの水脈	3:25
14.	"Breaking Through"	Yoshiki	突破	2:53
15.	"Final Battle"	Yoshiki	最期の戦い	2:50
16.	"Alone"	Ryoki Matsumoto & Satomi	ひとり	5:51
17.	"Snow in Summer"	Keiichi Okabe	夏ノ雪	4:59
18.	"Hills of Radiant Wind"	Okabe	光ノ風吹ク丘	2:53
19.	"City of Commerce"	Okabe	売買ノ街	2:18
20.	"Deep Crimson Foe"	Okabe	深紅ノ敵	2:21
21.	"Song of the Ancients / Fate"	Okabe	イニシエノウタ／運命	5:17
22.	"Emil / Karma"	Okabe	エミール／業苦	3:22
23.	"Shadowlord"	Okabe	魔王	5:01
24.	"Ashes of Dreams / Aratanaru"	Okabe	Ashes of Dreams／Aratanaru-Japanese version	6:29
25.	"Exhausted [piano version] / bonus tracks"	Sano	尽きる「piano version」/bonus tracks	4:46

== Singles ==
=== "Hitori" ===
"Hitori"

Single by Mika Nakashima

from the album Music
- Released: June 8, 2005
- Length: 5:56 (single ver.)
- Label: Sony Music Entertainment Japan
- Songwriters: Ryoki Matsumoto, Satomi

Mika Nakashima singles chronology
"Sakurairo Mau Koro" (2005)	"Hitori" (2005)	"Glamorous Sky" (2005)

"Hitori" (ひとり, Alone) is the theme song for the Japanese version of Drakengard 2. It was sung by Mika Nakashima, composed by Ryoki Matsumoto, and written by Satomi. Nakashima also worked as a producer for the soundtrack. The song, originally released as part of Nakashima's third album Music, was based on a previous composition for Star Ocean: The Second Story. The song was written as a musical followup to "Yuki no Hana", and the lyrics were written to include thematic connections to the game's story.

The single was released by Sony Music Entertainment Japan on June 16, 2005, containing four versions of the song. It reached #15 in the Oricon charts upon release and remained in the charts for six weeks. Opinions on the song have been generally positive. In his review of the soundtrack, Game-OST's Simon Smith called it "a soft jazz song with sultry smooth vocals and a nice tune", and praised it despite it not becoming one of his favorites. Mike Wilson, writing for RPGFan, referred to it as "possibly the most beautiful vocal I've ever heard in a video game." Chris Greening of Game Music Online called it "a strong rival to every single pop ballad released from Square Enix, proving rich yet accessible."

Track list
No.	Title	Japanese title	Length
1.	"Hitori (single version)"	ひとり[single version]	5:53
2.	"Hitori (album version)"	ひとり[album version]	5:51
3.	"Hitori (endroll version)"	ひとり[endroll version]	4:58
4.	"Hitori (instrumental)"	ひとり[instrumental]	5:53

=== "Kuroi Uta" ===
"Kuroi Uta"

Single by Eir Aoi

from the album Sirius
- Released: November 13, 2013
- Length: 6:20 (single ver.)
- Label: Sony Music Entertainment Japan
- Songwriters: Keiichi Okabe, Kikuchi Hana

Eir Aoi singles chronology
"Cobalt Sky" (2013)	"Kuroi Uta" (2013)	"Niji no Oto" (2004)

"Kuroi Uta" (クロイウタ, Black Song) is one of the two theme songs for Drakengard 3. It was sung by Eir Aoi, composed by Drakengard 3 composer Keichi Okabe and written by Kikuchi Hana, one of the original scenario writers for Nier. Aoi, a singer native to Hokkaido, was chosen by Okabe to perform the song due to her outspoken admiration of the Drakengard series.

Eir Aoi's fifth single, "Kuroi Uta" was originally released on November 13, 2013 as the final track on the single disc "Sirius". The single reached #21 in the Oricon charts and remained in the charts for fourteen weeks.

Track list
No.	Title	Japanese title	Length
1.	"Sirius"	シリウス[single version]	4:28
2.	"Addicted..."		3:32
3.	"Kuroi Uta"	クロイウタ	6:23
4.	"Sirus (instrumental)"	シリウス[instrumental]	4:24

=== "This Silence is Mine" ===
"This Silence is Mine"

Single by Onitsuka Chihiro
- Released: December 18, 2013
- Length: 7:06
- Label: NAPOLEON RECORDS
- Songwriters: Keiichi Okabe, Onitsuka Chihiro
- Producer: Square Enix

Onitsuka Chihiro singles chronology
"Itazura Pierrot" (2013)	"This Silence is Mine" (2013)	"Anata to Science" (2013)

"This Silence Is Mine", the game's second theme song, was specially written and sung by Onitsuka Chihiro. It was composed by Okabe. Okabe asked Chihiro to help with the song because he felt she would be the perfect singer to project the world and themes of Drakengard 3. The intention was to make the song emotionally intense, but at the same time "cold" and "empty". While writing the song, Chihiro was inspired by Zero's presentation within the game. The original draft of the song was created in around five minutes, and Chihiro had to sing the song five times before Okabe was satisfied with her performance. The song debuted in the game's trailer at the 2013 Tokyo Game Show.

The single was released on a CD along with a version of her following single "Anata to Science" (あなたとSciencE, You and Science). The single reached 36th place in the Oricon charts. Huynh was positive about the song in his review of the soundtrack, saying that Chihiro "[brought] her best, delivering an emotional track with a powerful buildup to a dizzying climax." Gann was also positive, saying Chihiro's singing style fitted the tone of both game and series, calling the delivery "superb". He also called Okabe's production of the song "very smart".

Track list
No.	Title	Japanese title	Length
1.	"This Silence is Mine"		7:06
2.	"Anata to SciencE ~hysteric version~"	あなたとSciencE ~hysteric version~	3:51

== See also ==
- Music of Nier
