= Aishiteru =

Aishiteru may refer to:

- "Aishiteru" (Miho Komatsu song)
- "Aishiteru" (Mika Nakashima song)
- "Aishiteru" (Ken Hirai song)
- Aishiteru: Kaiyō, a 2006 Japanese manga series by Minoru Itō
