= Love (Mika Nakashima album) =

Studio album by Mika Nakashima
- Released: November 6, 2003
- Genre: J-pop; jazz; adult contemporary; easy listening
- Length: 1:12:24
- Label: Sony Music Associated Records

Mika Nakashima chronology
| Resistance (2002) | Love (2003) | Oborozukiyo: Inori (2004) |

Love (stylized as "LØVE") is the second studio album by Japanese entertainer Mika Nakashima, and her third overall album release counting the mini-album Resistance. Its release date was November 6, 2003, in Japan, prior to the Christmas holiday. In contrast to her previous album, True, this album boasts a wider range of styles including ballads, soft reggae, and club jazz. It proved to be a successful move as the album outsold her debut; it topped the Oricon 200 Album Chart upon release and sold just over 437,000 copies in Japan alone the week it came out.

Love won the Best Album Award at the 45th Japan Record Awards, and has sold 1,447,681 copies to date - making this album the best-selling album in Nakashima's career.

== Track listing ==
All lyrics are written by Mika Nakashima, unless otherwise noted.

| No. | Title | Lyrics | Music | Arranger(s) | Length |
|---|---|---|---|---|---|
| 1. | "Venus in The Dark" | | Yasunari Okano | absolute3 | 6:05 |
| 2. | "Love Addict" | | Shinichi Osawa (Mondo Grosso) | Shinichi Osawa (Mondo Grosso) | 7:17 |
| 3. | "aroma" | | Yoshiko Goshima | Takahiro Watanabe | 6:18 |
| 4. | "Yuki no Hana (雪の華)" | Satomi | Ryouki Matsumoto | Ryouki Matsumoto | 5:43 |
| 5. | "RESISTANCE" (album version) | Yasushi Akimoto, Mika Nakashima | Seikou Nagaoka | Coldfeet, Shin Kono | 4:56 |
| 6. | "FIND THE WAY" | | Lori Fine (Coldfeet) | Ken Shima | 5:28 |
| 7. | "marionette" | | Nobuyuki Shimizu | Nobuyuki Shimizu | 5:14 |
| 8. | "Seppun (接吻)" (cover song) | Takao Tajima | Takao Tajima | Shunya Mori | 6:04 |
| 9. | "You send me love" | | Gota Nishidera | absolute3 | 5:00 |
| 10. | "Be in Silence" | | absolute | absolute3 | 5:39 |
| 11. | "LOVE NO CRY" | | Arata Tanimoto | Chokkaku | 5:18 |
| 12. | "Aishiteru (愛してる)" (album version) | H (three tight b) | H (three tight b) | shinya (three tight b) | 5:35 |
| 13. | "LAST WALTZ" | | Yasunari Okano | Nobuyuki Shimizu | 4:10 |

== Charts and sales ==
=== Oricon sales charts (Japan) ===
| Release | Chart | Peak position | First week sales | Sales total |
|---|---|---|---|---|
| November 6, 2003 | Oricon Daily Albums Chart | 1 | | |
| November 6, 2003 | Oricon Weekly Albums Chart | 1 | 437,218 | 1,447,681 |
| November 6, 2003 | Oricon Monthly Albums Chart | 1 | | |
| November 6, 2003 | Oricon Yearly Albums Chart | 12 | | |

=== Singles ===
| Date | Title | Peak position |
|---|---|---|
| 2003-01-29 | Ai Shiteru | 4 |
| 2003-04-09 | Love Addict | 5 |
| 2003-06-25 | Seppun | 4 |
| 2003-08-06 | Find the Way | 4 |
| 2003-10-01 | Yuki no Hana | 3 |

| Preceded by Hummingbird (Chitose Hajime) | Japan Record Award for the Best Album; 2003 | Succeeded by Onna no Ehon (Hiroshi Itsuki) |
