= Hitoiro =

"一色" "Hitoiro" lit. Monochrome"

Single by Nana starring Mika Nakashima

from the album The End
- Released: 29 November 2006
- Genre: Rock
- Length: 5:11
- Label: Sony
- Songwriter(s): Takuro from Glay and Ai Yazawa

Nana starring Mika Nakashima singles chronology
"My Sugar Cat" (2006)	"一色" "Hitoiro" lit. Monochrome" (2006)	"Mienai Hoshi" (2007)

"Hitoiro" (一色; One Color) is Mika Nakashima's 20th single overall and her second under the name Nana starring Mika Nakashima. This single was released on the 29 November 2006. The single was the main themes of "Nana 2" and her last single under the name Nana starring Mika Nakashima. The B-side, "Eyes for the Moon" also featured in the movie.

== Track listing ==
No.	Title	Lyrics	Music	Arranger(s)	Length
1.	"Hitoiro (一色; Monochrome)"	Ai Yazawa	Takuro (Glay)	Takuro, Masahide Sakuma
2.	"Hitoiro" (Instrumental)	Ai Yazawa	Takuro	Takuro, Masahide Sakuma
3.	"Eyes for the Moon"	Takuro	Takuro	Takuro, Masahide Sakuma
4.	"Eyes for the Moon" (Instrumental)	Takuro	Takuro	Takuro, Masahide Sakuma

== Charts ==
"Hitoiro" only managed to debut at #4 in the daily charts. It reached #3 for the weekly charts with 33,015 copies sold in the first week. Furthermore, "Hitoiro" did not sell as well as "Glamorous Sky", which became the top-selling female single of 2005. However, it has sold 100,543 copies.

Total Reported Sales: 100,543* (as of 2008.04.04, last charting week)
