= Legend (Mika Nakashima song) =

Single by Mika Nakashima

from the album Music
- Released: 20 October 2004
- Length: 5:49
- Label: Sony
- Songwriters: Mika Nakashima; Yasunari Okano

Mika Nakashima singles chronology
"Hi no Tori" (2004)	"Legend" (2004)	"Sakurairo Mau Koro" (2005)

"Legend" is the fourth single from Mika Nakashima's third album, Music. It was released a month after her mini album Oborozukiyo: Inori. It was a minor success, peaking at #5 in the Oricon charts and charting for 11 weeks. Overall, it sold 67,527 units in Japan, of which more than half in its first week. Legend was used as the Sony MD Walkman CM song. The B-sides were "FAKE"; used as the Kanebo Kate CM song, and "Carrot & Whip"; the Meiji CM song.

There are three versions of the song. The first one is the version set to the music video. This track is on the Legend single, the Music album and the Best compilation album. Another one is an island-tinged pop ballad version and it exists on the single as track two. The remaining version is the instrumental, featured on the single as track five.

== Track listing ==
1. Legend (Main)
2. Legend (Original)
3. Fake
4. Carrot & Whip
5. Legend (Instrumental)

== Charts ==
=== Oricon Sales Chart (Japan) ===
Release	Chart	Peak position	First week sales	Sales total	Chart run
20 October 2004	Oricon Daily Charts	#5			
20 October 2004	Oricon Weekly Charts	5	35,332	67,527	11 weeks
