= Keiichi Tomita =

- 冨田 恵一
- Born: 冨田 恵一 (Tomita Keiichi); January 1, 1962 (age 64); Asahikawa, Hokkaido, Japan
- Other name: Tomita Lab
- Citizenship: Japan
- Occupations: Musician; record producer; songwriter
- Years active: 1988–present
- Musical career
- Genres: Japanese pop; Jazz fusion; Electronic music
- Instruments: Guitar; bass; keyboards; piano; synthesizer
- Labels: Sony Music Associated Records; Rhythm Zone; Speedstar Records
- Website: tomitalab.com

Keiichi Tomita (冨田 恵一, Tomita Keiichi; born January 1, 1962) is a Japanese music producer, composer, and arranger. Known in Japan as a "pop maestro" and "master of sound," Tomita has produced several tracks that have achieved popularity in Japan, including Misia’s song "Everything" and Mika Nakashima’s debut single "Stars." He has collaborated with a diverse array of musicians, including Kirinji, Bird, Maaya Sakamoto, Ringo Sheena, and Kaela Kimura.

== Biography ==
Tomita was born in Asahikawa, Hokkaido. During his teenage years, Tomita developed a deep appreciation for vocal music, citing influences like The Beatles and Stevie Wonder. Upon perfecting his guitar skills in high school, his musical interests expanded to include jazz and fusion, which naturally led him to admire Steely Dan. After finishing high school, Tomita relocated to study at Dokkyo University, where he immersed himself in music as an amateur musician. By the mid-1980s, Tomita entered the professional music scene as a studio musician, releasing music with indie bands Kedge in 1988, and Moves in 1996.

By the 1990s, he had established himself as a full-fledged music producer, and in 1997 he began working with Kirinji, who were part of the same agency as Moves, before their major debut. Infusing complex chord progressions with elements of jazz and adult-oriented rock, he crafted pop songs with a style reminiscent of Steely Dan, producing tracks like "Aliens" (2000) and "Good Day Goodbye" (2000). In 2000, Tomita also produced Misia’s "Everything," blending the tight rhythms of black music with expansive string arrangements. The song topped the Oricon Singles Chart, becoming a major hit and setting a benchmark for ballad arrangements in J-pop. Thereafter, In this early stage of his production career, he frequently received requests to create ballads, and Tomita continued to produce and arrange for artists such as Mika Nakashima, Yumi Matsutoya, Ken Hirai, Ringo Sheena, and Chemistry. While his sound often emphasized live instrumentation, in recent years he has incorporated programmed beats and rap.

In 2003, he launched his solo project Tomita Lab (冨田ラボ, Tomita Rabo), where he collaborated with various singers to create pop music with experimental elements. Over the years, he collaborated with a diverse roster of singers, creating experimental yet accessible pop songs that reflect his evolving creative vision. In 2003, he released his first studio album as Tomita Lab, entitled Shipbuilding, which was followed by Shiplaunching (2006) and Shipahead (2010)—collectively known as the Ship series. In 2011, he released his first compilation album, Keiichi Tomita Works Best: Beautiful Songs to Remember, which was followed by Tomita Lab/Keiichi Tomita Works Best 2 in 2023. The Tomita Lab project is haracterized by its concept of "simulationism" (シミュレーショニズム), where Tomita draws inspiration from the textures and performance qualities of vintage recordings, particularly from the 1970s, while creating original pop music.

In 2014, Tomita published Nightfly: Creation and Appreciation Methods of the Art of Recording (ナイトフライ 録音芸術の作法と鑑賞法), a book reflecting on the concept of simulationism, Tomita's production and compositional philosophy rooted in recreating or emulating the aesthetic, techniques, and sonic qualities of pop music from specific historical periods, particularly the 1970s and 1980s, influenced by artists like Donald Fagen.

== Discography ==
=== Studio albums ===
Title	Details
Shipbuilding	Released: February 5, 2003; Label: Toshiba EMI; Formats: CD, LP, digital download
Shiplaunching	Released: February 22, 2006; Label: Sony Music Associated Records; Formats: CD, digital download
Shipahead	Released: February 3, 2010; Label: Rhythm Zone; Formats: CD, CD+DVD, digital download
Joyous	Released: October 23, 2013; Label: Speedstar Records; Formats: CD, CD+DVD, digital download
Superfine	Released: March 1, 2017; Label: Speedstar Records; Formats: CD, CD+DVD, LP, digital download
M-P-C "Mentality, Physicality, Computer"	Released: October 2, 2018; Label: Speedstar Records; Formats: CD-Blu-ray disc, LP, digital download
7+	Released: June 29, 2022; Label: Speedstar Records; Formats: CD-Blu-ray disc, LP, digital download

=== Compilation albums ===
Title	Details
Keiichi Tomita Works Best: Beautiful Songs to Remember	Released: March 2, 2011; Label: Rhythm Zone; Formats: CD
Tomita Lab/Keiichi Tomita Works Best 2: Beautiful Songs to Remember	Released: June 21, 2023; Label: Speedstar Records; Formats: CD, LP
