= Original Love =

Japanese music band

- Origin: Tokyo, Japan
- Genres: J-pop; R&B; alternative rock; smooth jazz
- Years active: 1986–present
- Labels: Pony Canyon, EMI
- Members: Takao Tajima
- Past members: Takashi Murayama; Hideyuki Komatsu; Makoto Ori; Nobuyuki Mori; Ryutaro Kihara; Shigeo Miyata; Yukihiro Akiyama

Original Love (オリジナル・ラブ) is a Japanese music band and project by Takao Tajima. The band was formed in 1986 with four members, but since 1995 they have been a solo project for Takao Tajima.

They were nominated in the 1994 MTV Video Music Awards for the International Viewer's Choice Award for MTV Japan category.

They released a song titled "Happy Birthday Song" (ハッピーバースデイソング) on April 24, 2018. They released their 18th album on February 12, 2019.

Their song "Seppun" (接吻) was covered by Mika Nakashima in 2003.
