= Hi no Tori (song) =

"火の鳥 "Hi no Tori" lit. "Fire Bird"/"Phoenix""

Single by Mika Nakashima

from the album Music
- Released: June 2, 2004
- Label: Sony
- Songwriters: Hidekazu Uchiike, Reiko Yukawa

Mika Nakashima singles chronology
"Seven" (2004)	"火の鳥 "Hi no Tori" lit. "Fire Bird"/"Phoenix"" (2004)	"Legend" (2004)

"Hi no Tori" *(火の鳥; "Fire Bird", or "Phoenix") is the 12th single by Mika Nakashima, and was used as the ending theme for the NHK anime Hi no Tori. It reached #9 on the Oricon weekly charts and sold roughly 40,000 copies.

== Track listing ==
1. "Hi no Tori" (火の鳥; "Fire Bird", "Phoenix"
2. "Missing
3. "Hi no Tori" (Instrumental)
