= Will (Mika Nakashima song) =

Single by Mika Nakashima

from the album True
- Released: August 7, 2002
- Genre: Ballad
- Label: Sony
- Songwriter(s): Yasushi Akimoto, Daisuke Kawaguchi

Mika Nakashima singles chronology
"Helpless Rain" (2002)	"Will" (2002)	"Ai Shiteru" (2002)

"Will" is Mika Nakashima's 5th single. The single was released on August 7, 2002, and sold 144,771 copies, reaching #3 on Oricon.

'Will,' an easy listening ballad, was the theme song for the Japanese drama 'Tentai Kansoku' (Searchin' for My Polestar) in 2002. It is found on the compilation Best and on the album TRUE where the 2nd song Just Trust in Our Love is also found.

== Chart history ==
Chart (2002)	Peak position
Oricon Weekly Singles Top 100	3
Chart (2002)	Peak position
Oricon 2002 Singles Top 100	88

== Track listing ==
1. Will
2. Just Trust in Our Love
3. Will (Instrumental)
4. Just Trust in Our Love (Instrumental)
