= Find the Way =

Single by Mika Nakashima

from the album Love
- Language: Japanese
- B-side: "Seppun (at-tica Remix)"
- Released: August 6, 2003
- Recorded: 2003
- Studio: 5:28
- Genre: J-pop
- Label: Sony Records
- Composer: Lori Fine
- Lyricist: Mika Nakashima

Mika Nakashima singles chronology
"Seppun" (2003)	"Find the Way" (2003)	"Yuki no Hana" (2004)

Music video
- "Find the Way" on YouTube

"Find the Way" is the ninth single by Mika Nakashima. Written by Nakashima and Lori Fine, the single was released by Sony Records on August 6, 2003. It was used as the third ending theme of the anime series Mobile Suit Gundam SEED.

The single peaked at No. 4 on Oricon's singles chart and sold roughly 124,489 copies.

== Track listing ==
No.	Title	Lyrics	Music	Arrangement	Length
1.	"Find the Way"	Mika Nakashima	Lori Fine	Ken Shima	5:28
2.	"Find the Way" (Instrumental)	Nakashima	Fine	Shima	5:28
3.	"Seppun (at-tica Remix)" ((接吻（at-tica remix）; "Kiss (at-tica Remix)"))	Takao Tajima	Tajima	at-tica	5:32
4.	"Find the Way" (Jamaals Manatee Mix by the Orb)	Nakashima	Fine	Shima	5:31
Total length:					21:59

== Chart positions ==
Weekly charts

Chart (2003)	Peak position
Japanese Oricon Singles Chart	4

Year-end charts

Chart (2003)	Peak position
Japanese Oricon Singles Chart	79

== Cover versions ==
- Hiroko Moriguchi covered the song on her 2025 album Gundam Song Covers: Orchestra.
