= Resistance (EP) =

EP by Mika Nakashima
- Released: November 7, 2002
- Genre: J-pop; jazz; pop; adult contemporary; easy listening
- Length: 31:31
- Label: Sony

Mika Nakashima chronology
| True (2002) | Resistance (2002) | Love (2003) |

Resistance is the first EP or mini-album (second overall release) by Mika Nakashima, though the title track later appears on her Love album. This mini-album reached #1 on the Oricon charts and charted for six weeks.

"Resistance" was used as the Meiji confectionery CM song, and "Heaven on Earth" (EP Version) was used as Nakashima's first Kanebo Kate CM song.

This EP or mini-album sold nearly all of its 200,000 copies. However, the mini-album was also released in Hong Kong and Korea.

== Track listing ==
| No. | Title | Lyrics | Music | Arranger(s) | Length |
|---|---|---|---|---|---|
| 1. | "Resistance" (Album Version) | Yasushi Akimoto, Mika Nakashima | Seikou Nagaoka | Coldfeet | 4:52 |
| 2. | "Heaven on Earth" (EP Version) | Ken Kato, Lori Fine (Coldfeet) | Lori Fine (Coldfeet) | Coldfeet | 3:57 |
| 3. | "Aroma" | Mika Nakashima | Yoshiko Goshima | Takahiro Watanabe | 6:28 |
| 4. | "Last Waltz" | Mika Nakashima | Yasunari Okano | Nobuyuki Shimizu | 4:12 |
| 5. | "Stars" (Live Unplugged) | Yasushi Akimoto | Daisuke Kawaguchi | Keiichi Tomita | 7:11 |
| 6. | "Resistance" (Instrumental) | Yasushi Akimoto, Mika Nakashima | Seikou Nagaoka | Coldfeet | 4:51 |

== Oricon sales charts (Japan) ==
| Release | Chart | Peak position | First week sales | Sales total |
|---|---|---|---|---|
| November 7, 2002 | Oricon Daily Albums Chart | 1 | | |
| November 7, 2002 | Oricon Weekly Albums Chart | 1 | 132,150 | 199,965 |
