= The End (Mika Nakashima album) =

Studio album by Nana starring Mika Nakashima
- Released: December 13, 2006
- Genre: Rock, J-pop
- Length: 47:21
- Label: Sony Music Associated Records

Nana starring Mika Nakashima chronology
Best (2005)	The End (2006)	Yes (2007)

The End is Mika Nakashima's fourth studio album (fifth full-length album and seventh overall release), and her only album released under the name "Nana starring Mika Nakashima". It marks the end of Nakashima's bond with the Nana franchise, and is also referred to as First and Last Album of Nakashima's role Nana Oosaki.

All of the songs on "The End" are rock-oriented songs.

== Track listing ==
CD
No.	Title	Lyrics	Music	Arranger(s)	Length
1.	"Hitoiro" (一色; One Color)	Ai Yazawa	Takuro	Takuro, Masahide Sakuma	5:21
2.	"Eyes for the Moon"	Takuro	Takuro	Takuro, Masahide Sakuma	3:39
3.	"Glamorous Sky"	Ai Yazawa	Hyde	Hyde, K.A.Z	4:26
4.	"Blowing Out"	Lori Fine (from Coldfeet), Mika Nakashima	Lori Fine	Takamune Negishi	3:27
5.	"My Medicine"	Lori Fine	Yasuhiro Minami	Takamune Negishi	3:37
6.	"Neglest Mind"	mmm.31f.jp	Hiroaki Ōno	Masami Tsuchiya	3:57
7.	"Real World"	mmm.31f.jp	Teruyoshi Akiyama	Masami Tsuchiya	4:08
8.	"Isolation"	mmm.31f.jp	Yasuhiro Minami	Takamune Negishi	4:42
9.	"Blood"	mmm.31f.jp	Shigekazu Koga	Takamune Negishi	4:39
10.	"Hitoiro" (ALTAnative)	Ai Yazawa	Takuro	Takuro, Masahide Sakuma	5:06
11.	"My Way"	Paul Anka, Lucien Marie Antoine Thibaut, Claude Francois	Jacques Revaux	Takamune Negishi	4:19

== Charts and sales ==
=== Oricon sales charts (Japan) ===
Release	Chart	Peak position	First week sales	Sales total
December 13, 2006	Oricon Daily Albums Chart	2		
December 13, 2006	Oricon Weekly Albums Chart	2	80,616	181,571
December 13, 2006	Oricon Monthly Singles Chart	18		
December 13, 2006	Oricon Yearly Albums Chart	65		
