= Seppun =

Single by Mika Nakashima

from the album Love
- Released: June 25, 2003
- Label: Sony
- Songwriter: Takao Tajima

Mika Nakashima singles chronology
"Love Addict" (2003)	"Seppun" (2003)	"Find the Way" (2004)

"Seppun" (接吻, Kiss) is the 8th single by Mika Nakashima. It peaked on the Oricon weekly charts at #4, and sold roughly 38,429 copies.

== Outline ==
Nakashima covered Original Love's fifth single Seppun –kiss– (接吻 –kiss–) released in 1993. This single had a limited production of 50,000 copies.

== Track listing ==
All tracks are written by Takao Tajima, arranged by Shunya Mori.

CD
No.	Title	Length
1.	"Seppun (接吻; Kiss)"
2.	"Seppun" (Yard Style Mix)
3.	"Seppun" (Dennis Bovell Lovers Dub #2)
4.	"Seppun" (Instrumental)
