= Helpless Rain =

2002 single by Mika Nakashima

Single by Mika Nakashima

from the album True
- Released: May 15, 2002
- Genre: Pop
- Label: Sony
- Songwriter(s): Masato Ochi, shinya

Mika Nakashima singles chronology
"One Survive" (2002)	"Helpless Rain" (2002)	"Will" (2002)

"Helpless Rain" is Japanese singer Mika Nakashima's fourth single. Track two was a remix featuring hip-hop musicians Heartsdales and Verbal of M-Flo. The single was released on May 15, 2002. "Helpless Rain" sold 82,830 copies, reaching number eight on Oricon Singles Chart.

== Track listing ==
1. Helpless Rain
2. Helpless Rain (But I'm Fallin' Too Deep)
3. Destiny's Lotus (Version)
4. Helpless Rain (Instrumental)
