= One Survive =

Single by Mika Nakashima

from the album True
- Released: 6 March 2002
- Genre: Pop
- Label: Sony
- Songwriters: Minako Yoshida, T2ya

Mika Nakashima singles chronology
"Crescent Moon" (2002)	"One Survive" (2002)	"Helpless Rain" (2002)

"One Survive" is Mika Nakashima's third single. The single was released on the 6 March 2002. "One Survive", which boasts a sophisticated fusion of house and Latin jazz, was the theme song of Kodak MAX Beauty CM. It reached number eight on the Oricon Weekly Top 200, and the single sold 86,600 copies.

== Track listing ==
1. One Survive
2. True Eyes
3. Crescent Moon (Gonga Massive Version)
4. One Survive (Blaze Shelter Remix)
5. One Survive (Instrumental)
6. True Eyes (Instrumental)

== Charts ==
Chart performance for "One Survive"
Chart (2002)	Peak position
Japan (Oricon)	8
