= Crescent Moon (song) =

Single by Mika Nakashima

from the album True
- Released: 6 February 2002
- Genre: Pop
- Label: Sony
- Songwriters: Hiroaki Ōno, Takashi Matsumoto

Mika Nakashima singles chronology
"Stars" (2001)	"Crescent Moon" (2002)	"One Survive" (2002)

"Crescent Moon" is Mika Nakashima's second single. "Crescent Moon", which mixes 1980s-style house with disco and Latin pop, was a 100,000-copy limited-edition single, and it sold 98,570 copies, reaching #4 on the Oricon Singles Chart. The single was released on 6 February 2002.

== Track listing ==
1. Crescent Moon
2. Destiny's Lotus
3. Amazing Grace
4. Crescent Moon [Instrumental]
5. Destiny's Lotus [Instrumental]
