= Seven (Mika Nakashima song) =

Single by Mika Nakashima

from the album Music
- Released: April 7, 2004
- Label: Sony
- Songwriter(s): Mika Nakashima, Lori Fine

Mika Nakashima singles chronology
"Yuki no Hana" (2003)	"Seven" (2004)	"Hi no Tori" (2004)

"Seven" is the 11th single by Mika Nakashima. It was used as the Kanebo Kate CM song. It reached #3 on the Oricon charts and charted for seven weeks, selling around 53,000 units.

== Track listing ==
1. Seven
2. Seven (Coldfeet Remix)
3. Venus in the Dark (Coldfeet Remix)
4. Seven (Instrumental)
