= Music (Mika Nakashima album) =

Studio album by Mika Nakashima
- Released: March 9, 2005
- Recorded: 2005
- Genre: J-pop; adult contemporary; easy listening
- Length: 1:09:04
- Label: Sony Music Associated Records

Mika Nakashima chronology
| Oborozukiyo: Inori (2004) | Music (2005) | Best (2005) |

Singles from Real
- 1. "Seven" Released: April 7, 2004; 2. "Hi no Tori" Released: June 2, 2004; 3. "Legend" Released: October 20, 2004; 4. "Sakurairo Mau Koro" Released: February 2, 2005; 5. "Hitori" Released: June 8, 2005

Music is the third studio album by Mika Nakashima (fifth overall release). It sold only 231,521 copies in its first week but went to #1 on the Oricon 200 Album Chart. The album charted for 31 weeks and has since sold over 500,000 copies.

== Track listing ==
| No. | Title | Lyrics | Music | Arranger(s) | Length |
|---|---|---|---|---|---|
| 1. | "Sakurairo Mau Koro (桜色舞うころ, When We Dance in the Cherryblossom's Color)" | Minako Kawae | Minako Kawae | Satoshi Takebe | 4:54 |
| 2. | "Oborozukiyo: Inori (朧月夜～祈り, A Misty, Moon-lit Night~Prayer)" | Tatsuyuki Takano, Mika Nakashima (additional lyrics) | Teiichi Okano, Taro Hakase (additional music) | Taro Hakase | 5:59 |
| 3. | "Hi no Tori (火の鳥, Phoenix)" | Reiko Yukawa | Hidekazu Uchiike | Keiichi Tomita | 4:31 |
| 4. | "Kumo no Ito (蜘蛛の糸, Spider's Thread)" | Mika Nakashima | Yoshiko Goshima | Toshiyuki Mori | 5:54 |
| 5. | "Rocking Horse" | mmm.31f.jp, Mika Nakashima | Lensei | Yasuharu Konishi | 3:37 |
| 6. | "Carrot & Whip" | Mika Nakashima | Yoshiko Goshima | Chokkaku | 5:21 |
| 7. | "Shadows of You" | Lori Fine (Coldfeet), Mika Nakashima | Celetia Martin (Big Life Music) | Takefumi Haketa | 4:25 |
| 8. | "Legend (Main)" | Mika Nakashima | Yasunari Okano | Coldfeet | 5:46 |
| 9. | "Hemurokku (ヘムロック, Hemlock)" | Mika Nakashima | Kazuo Yoda | Yoshito Tanaka | 6:42 |
| 10. | "Seven" | Mika Nakashima | Lori Fine (Coldfeet) | Coldfeet | 4:25 |
| 11. | "Fake" | Ayumi Miyazaki, Mika Nakashima | Ayumi Miyazaki | Ayumi Miyazaki | 5:13 |
| 12. | "Fed Up" | Mika Nakashima | Hiroshi Hayashi | Takamune Negishi | 6:05 |
| 13. | "Hitori (ひとり, Alone)" | Satomi | Ryouki Matsumoto | Ken Shima | 5:53 |

== Charts and sales ==
=== Oricon sales charts (Japan) ===
| Release | Chart | Peak position | Debut sales | Sales total |
|---|---|---|---|---|
| March 9, 2005 | Oricon Daily Albums Chart | 1 | | |
| March 9, 2005 | Oricon Weekly Albums Chart | 1 | 231,521 | 547,148 |
| March 9, 2005 | Oricon Monthly Albums Chart | 1 | | |
| March 9, 2005 | Oricon Yearly Albums Chart | 16 | | |

=== Singles ===
| Date | Title | Peak position |
|---|---|---|
| 2004-04-07 | Seven | 3 |
| 2004-06-02 | "Hi no Tori" | 9 |
| 2004-10-20 | "Legend" | 5 |
| 2005-02-02 | "Sakurairo Mau Koro" | 5 |
| 2005-05-25 | "Hitori" | 15 |
