= Glamorous Sky =

Single by Nana starring Mika Nakashima

from the album The End & Best
- Released: August 31, 2005
- Recorded: 2005
- Genre: J-pop; pop punk
- Length: 4:27
- Label: Sony
- Songwriters: Hyde (composition); Ai Yazawa (lyrics)

Nana starring Mika Nakashima singles chronology
"Hitori" (2005)	"Glamorous Sky" (2005)	"Cry No More" (2006)

Music video
- "Glamorous Sky" on YouTube

"Glamorous Sky" is Mika Nakashima's 16th single overall, her 1st under the name Nana starring Mika Nakashima, and the second most successful single in her career after "Stars". It is her first rock song and it was used as one of the image songs for the film Nana (as one of the bands Black Stones' song). Hyde of L'Arc-en-Ciel composed "Glamorous Sky". The second and third B-sides, "Blood" and "Isolation" were used as CM songs for Kate cosmetics. Mika Nakashima graces the cover of the single as Nana Osaki.

The song is featured as a cover by a jrock band, Girugamesh, in the Konami music games, BEMANI for DrumMania V3 and GuitarFreaks V3, as well as the iNiS rhythm game Moero! Nekketsu Rhythm Damashii Osu! Tatakae! Ouendan 2. Hyde, the composer of this track, also released a version in 2018.

== Commercial performance ==
This is Nakashima's only single to debut at #1 on the Oricon weekly charts. It stayed at #1 in the daily charts for two entire weeks, which none of her other singles have achieved. "Glamorous Sky" sold 120,202 units for its first week, outselling the #2 single of the week from w-inds by 72,993 units. In the second week it was also #1, with the #2 spot being occupied by her Nana co-star Yuna Ito and her single, "Endless Story"; the latter would eventually outsell "Glamorous Sky" in 2006 Overall, "Glamorous Sky" has sold 444,067 copies since release and has charted in the Oricon charts for 28 weeks. It managed to reach #10 in the 2005 Oricon year end charts, the highest position for a female artist on those charts that year.

== Live performances ==
- 2005-11-21 – Best Hit Kayousai 2005
- 2005-11-30 – NTV's Best Artist
- 2005-12-07 – FNS Kayousai
- 2005-12-23 – Music Station
- 2005-12-31 – CDTV
- 2005-12-31 – Japan Record Awards

== Track list ==
CD single
No.	Title	Lyrics	Music	Arranger(s)	Length
1.	"Glamorous Sky"	Ai Yazawa	hyde	hyde, K.A.Z
2.	"My Medicine"	Lori Fine (Coldfeet)	Yasuhiro Minami	Takamune Negishi (Dr.StrangeLove)
3.	"Blood"	mmm.31f.jp	Shigekazu Koga	Takamune Negishi
4.	"Isolation"	mmm.31f.jp	Yasuhiro Minami	Takamune Negishi
5.	"Glamorous Sky" (instrumental)	Ai Yazawa	hyde	hyde, K.A.Z
6.	"My Medicine" (instrumental)	Lori Fine	Yasuhiro Minami	Takamune Negishi

Vinyl – Side A
No.	Title	Lyrics	Music	Arranger(s)	Length
1.	"Glamorous Sky"	Ai Yazawa	hyde	hyde, K.A.Z
2.	"My Medicine"	Lori Fine	Yasuhiro Minami	Takamune Negishi

Vinyl – Side B
No.	Title	Lyrics	Music	Arranger(s)	Length
1.	"Blood"	mmm.31f.jp	Shigekazu Koga	Takamune Negishi
2.	"Isolation"	mmm.31f.jp	Yasuhiro Minami	Takamune Negishi

== Charts ==
=== Weekly charts ===
Chart (2005)	Peak position
Japan Singles (Oricon)	1

=== Monthly charts ===
Chart (2005)	Peak position
Japan Singles (Oricon)	1

=== Year-end charts ===
Chart (2005)	Position
Japan Singles (Oricon)	10

== Sales and certifications ==
Region	Certification	Certified units/sales
Japan (RIAJ) Physical	2× Platinum	445,000
Japan (RIAJ) Digital	3× Platinum	750,000^{*}
Japan (RIAJ) Chaku-uta	Million	1,000,000^{*}
Japan (RIAJ) Chaku-uta full	2× Platinum	500,000^{*}
^{*} Sales figures based on certification alone.
