= Aishiteru (Mika Nakashima song) =

Single by Mika Nakashima

from the album Love
- Released: January 29, 2003
- Recorded: 2003
- Genre: J-pop
- Length: 5:34
- Label: Sony Music Japan
- Songwriter: H
- Producers: H; Shinya

Mika Nakashima singles chronology
| "Will" (2003) | "Aishiteru" (2003) | "Love Addict" (2003) |

Music video
- "Aishiteru" on YouTube

"Aishiteru" (Japanese: 愛してる; trans. "I Love You") is the 6th single by Mika Nakashima, released for her second studio album Love (2003). The title track was written and composed by H, with additional arrangement handled by Shinya. Billed as a "St. Valentine EP for the Lovers," "Aishiteru" peaked at number four on the weekly Oricon Singles Chart, and was certified gold by the RIAJ for physical shipments of over 200,000 units.

== Track listing ==
CD single

1. "Ai Shiteru" (愛してる; I Love You) – 5:34
2. "Marionette" – 5:20
3. "The Rose" – 4:33
4. "Ai Shiteru" (Jazztronik Mix) – 7:40
5. "Ai Shiteru" (Instrumental) – 5:31

== Charts and sales ==
=== Single charts ===
| Chart (2003) | Peak position |
|---|---|
| Japan Weekly Singles (Oricon) | 4 |
| Japan Yearly Singles (Oricon) | 99 |

=== Certifications ===
| Region | Certification | Certified units/sales |
|---|---|---|
| Japan (RIAJ) Physical single | Gold | 200,000^{^} |
^{^} Shipments figures based on certification alone.
