= Hitori (song) =

"ひとり" "Hitori" lit. "Alone"

Single by Mika Nakashima

from the album Music
- Released: 2005-06-08
- Length: 5:56 (single ver.)
- Label: Sony
- Songwriters: Ryoki Matsumoto, Satomi

Mika Nakashima singles chronology
"Sakurairo Mau Koro" (2005)	"ひとり" "Hitori" lit. "Alone" (2005)	"Glamorous Sky" (2005)

"Hitori" (ひとり) is Mika Nakashima's 15th single. It is a re-cut single, originally from her Music album, and was used as the theme song for the PlayStation 2 game Drakengard 2. "Hitori (single ver.)" is the theme song for the game while "Hitori (Endroll ver.)" is the version heard during the credits. It was released a week ahead of the game. Overall, it sold 26,275 copies according to the Oricon charts.

== Track list ==
1. Hitori (single ver.) (ひとり; Alone)
2. Hitori (album ver.)
3. Hitori (endroll ver.)
4. Hitori (instrumental)

== Charts ==
=== Oricon Sales Chart ===
Release	Chart	Peak position	First week sales	Sales total	Chart run
2005-06-08	Oricon Daily Charts	9			
2005-06-08	Oricon Weekly Charts	15	15,169	26,275	6 weeks
