= Stars (Mika Nakashima song) =

Single by Mika Nakashima

from the album True
- Released: November 7, 2001
- Recorded: 2001
- Genre: J-pop
- Length: 6:08
- Label: Sony Music Japan
- Songwriter(s): Yasushi Akimoto
- Producer(s): Daisuke Kawaguchi; Keiichi Tomita

Mika Nakashima singles chronology
"Stars" (2001)	"Crescent Moon" (2002)

"Stars" is the debut single by Japanese singer Mika Nakashima. The single was released on November 7, 2001, reached number three on the weekly Oricon Singles Chart, and sold 469,180 copies, making it her highest-selling single to date. "Stars" was the theme song of the Japanese TV drama Kizudarake no Love Song, in which Mika also made her acting debut.

== Track listing ==
CD single
No.	Title	Lyrics	Music	Arranger(s)	Length
1.	"Stars"	Yasushi Akimoto	Daisuke Kawaguchi	Keiichi Tomita	6:08
2.	"Tears: Konayuki ga Mauyōni... (粉雪がまうように...)"	Yasushi Akimoto, Mika Nakashima	Koji Hayashi	Dreamfield	6:54
3.	"Stars" (Instrumental)		Daisuke Kawaguchi	Keiichi Tomita	6:08
4.	"Tears: Konayuki ga Mauyōni..." (Instrumental)		Koji Hayashi	Dreamfield	6:52
Total length:					26:04

== Charts and sales ==
=== Single charts ===
Chart (2003)	Peak position
Japan Weekly Singles (Oricon)	3
Japan Yearly Singles (Oricon)	34

=== Certifications ===
Region	Certification	Certified units/sales
Japan (RIAJ) Physical single	Platinum	469,180
Japan (RIAJ) Digital single	Gold	100,000^{*}
^{*} Sales figures based on certification alone.

== Release history ==
Region	Date	Format(s)	Label(s)	Ref.
Japan	November 7, 2001	CD single	Sony Music Japan	
Japan	August 21, 2002	12-inch vinyl	Sony Music Japan	
