= Oborozukiyo: Inori =

EP by Mika Nakashima
- Released: September 15, 2004
- Genre: J-pop
- Length: 41:08
- Label: Sony

Mika Nakashima chronology
Love (2003)	Oborozukiyo: Inori (2004)	Music (2005)

Oborozukiyo: Inori (朧月夜~祈り) is the 2nd EP or mini-album (fourth overall album release) by Mika Nakashima. This album was limited to only 111,000 copies. The title track, a duet with violinist Taro Hakase, later appears on her Music album. '朧月夜~祈り' translates to "A Misty, Moon-lit Night: Prayer."

This mini-album, when it was released, reached #3 on the Oricon 200 Album Chart, selling 93,000 copies in its first week.

== Track listing ==
CD
No.	Title	Lyrics	Music	Arranger(s)	Length
1.	"Oborozukiyo: Inori (朧月夜~祈り) with Taro Hakase"	Tatsuyuki Takano, Mika Nakashima (additional lyrics)	Teiichi Okano, Taro Hakase (additional music)	Taro Hakase
2.	"Sara (沙羅)"	Mika Nakashima	Taro Hakase	Taro Hakase
3.	"Tsuki no Sabaku (月の沙漠)"	Masao Kato	Suguru Sasaki	Taro Hakase
4.	"Yuki no Hana (雪の華)" (Silent Version)	Satomi	Ryoki Matsumoto	Taro Hakase
5.	"Oborozukiyo: Inori (朧月夜~祈り)" (Acoustic Mix)			Taro Hakase
6.	"Sara (沙羅)" (Jazztronik Remix)			Jazztronik
7.	"Oborozukiyo: Inori (朧月夜~祈り)" (Instrumental)

== Oricon sales charts (Japan) ==
Release	Chart	Peak position	Debut sales	Sales total
September 15, 2004	Oricon Weekly Albums Chart	3	93,416	110,892
