= True (Mika Nakashima album) =

Studio album by Mika Nakashima
- Released: August 28, 2002
- Recorded: 2001–2002
- Genre: J-pop; adult contemporary; easy listening
- Length: 1:04:24
- Label: Sony Music Associated Records

Mika Nakashima chronology
True (2002)	Resistance (2002)

True, stylized in all caps, is the first album by Japanese recording artist Mika Nakashima. The album's lyrics were written by a team of songwriters including Nakashima herself, Yasushi Akimoto, Minako Yoshida, Kenn Kato, Takashi Matsumoto, among others. In contrast to the typical Japanese J-pop and Western pop artist at the time, True was one in which Nakashima established a sound that would become her trademark for future albums: a mature, adult contemporary-influenced mixture of smooth jazz and soft pop.

Upon its release, True received favorable reviews from music critics. Many of those highlighted the singles as some of her best work, and complimented the album's production and Nakashima's vocals throughout. Commercially, the album was a success in Japan, reaching the top of the Oricon Albums Chart and eventually sold over one million units nationwide, earning it a million certification from the Recording Industry Association of Japan (RIAJ). It won Nakashima the Album of the Year Award at the 2003 Japan Gold Disc Awards.

To promote the album, Nakashima released five singles. The first and final singles, "Stars" and "Will," both peaked at number three on the Oricon Singles Chart, with "Stars" becoming her highest-selling single based on Oricon Style's database. The singles "Crescent Moon," "One Survive" and "Helpless Rain" were limited to 100,000 copies each. Furthermore, two video collections titled Film Lotus and Film Lotus II were released, which included all of the album's music videos.

== Background and composition ==
When Nakashima was 15 years old, she moved to Fukuoka, Fukuoka Prefecture, and shared an apartment with several people; she often traveled back and forth between Fukuoka and Kagoshima. At this time, she had accepted some auditions, but as a model, not a singer, but she failed in all the auditions. In the fall of 2000, while accepting some modeling auditions and determined to become a singer, she decided to send a demo tape to Sony Music Entertainment. In 2001, after hearing the demo tape sent by Nakashima, a record company employee recommended her to appear in "Sony Audition," a joint audition held by Sony Music Japan and Fuji TV, in which she was selected. Later, she was selected for the lead role in a dorama, and out of 3,000 applicants, she was qualified to be the lead role in the Fuji TV series Tainted Love Song, where she made her debut as a singer by singing the theme song "Stars," and made her debut as both a singer and actor.

For the album True, Sony Music Japan hired an array of musicians to work on it such as Yasushi Akimoto, Minako Yoshida, Kenn Kato, Takashi Matsumoto, among many others. The album was mastered by Stuart Hawkes at Metropolis Mastering in London. The opening track "Amazing Grace" is a cover of the famous Christian hymn by John Newton. The power ballad "Will" is a romantic number depicting the love and friendship of young people. "One Survive" is a dance tune with light keyboards and taut choruses. "Heaven on Earth" is a funky, upbeat tune with a touch of acid jazz. "Destiny's Lotus" is an upbeat tune with pure lyrics about continuing to sing for your dreams.

"Helpless Rain" is a collaboration with the sister unit Heartsdales, and is a somewhat melancholic medium-tempo ballad. "I" is a medium tempo number that combines a hip-hop-infused melody with folky vocals. "Tears~Konayuki ga Mau You ni...~" is a ballad that served as a B-side song to her debut single "Stars." "True Eyes" is a disco and dance-pop song influenced by R&B that talks about how trusting each other has many more benefits than expected. "Crescent Moon" is a groovy dance number with an 80's flavor. "Just Trust in Our Love" is a pop number with a four-on-the-floor beat. "Stars" is a romantic and grand love ballad. The closing track "A Miracle for You" is a pop ballad.

== Singles ==
Nakashima's debut single, "Stars," was released on November 7, 2001. It served as the theme song for the Kansai TV/Fuji TV dorama Tainted Love Song. Despite being her debut work, the single debuted at number three on the Oricon Singles Chart, boasting her highest sales to date with over 469,000 copies sold and being certified platinum.

== Track listing ==
No.	Title	Lyrics	Music	Arranger(s)	Length
1.	"Amazing Grace" (Album Version)	John Newton	John Newton	Dreamfield	3:48
2.	"Will" (Album Version)	Yasushi Akimoto	Daisuke Kawaguchi	Keiichi Tomita	5:30
3.	"One Survive" (Album Version)	Minako Yoshida	T2ya	O Dash	4:50
4.	"Heaven on Earth"	Kenn Kato	Lori Fine (from Coldfeet)	Coldfeet	3:56
5.	"Destiny's Lotus"	Mika Nakashima; RapDaizo (from Ketsumeishi)	Gajin	Towa Tei	3:59
6.	"Helpless Rain"	Masato Ochi	shinya (from three tight b)	Daisuke Imai	5:23
7.	"I"	Mika Nakashima	H (from three tight b)	shinya	4:35
8.	"Tears~Konayuki ga Mau You ni...~" (粉雪が舞うように....; Like Powder Snow is Dancing...)	Yasushi Akimoto, Mika Nakashima	Koji Hayashi	Dreamfield	6:47
9.	"True Eyes"	Hiromasa Ijichi	Yoko Kuzuya	Chokkaku	4:08
10.	"Crescent Moon"	Takashi Matsumoto	Hiroaki Ono	Yoshito Tanaka	4:16
11.	"Just Trust in Our Love" (Album Version)	H	shinya	Octopussy	4:45
12.	"Stars" (Album Version)	Yasushi Akimoto	Daisuke Kawaguchi	Keiichi Tomita	6:07
13.	"A Miracle for You"	Mika Nakashima	Yasunari Okano	Shin Kono	6:23

== Charts and sales ==
=== Oricon sales charts (Japan) ===
Release	Chart	Peak position	Sales total
2002-08-28	Oricon Daily Albums Chart	1	
2002-08-28	Oricon Weekly Albums Chart	1	1,173,534
2002-08-28	Oricon Yearly Albums Chart	8	

=== Singles ===
Date	Title	Peak position	Sales
2001-11-07	Stars	3	469,180
2002-02-06	Crescent Moon	4	100,000
2002-03-06	One Survive	8	86,600
2002-05-15	Helpless Rain	8	82,830
2002-08-07	Will	3	144,771
