= Yuki no Hana =

Single by Mika Nakashima

from the album Love
- Released: October 1, 2003
- Recorded: 2003
- Genre: J-pop
- Length: 5:41
- Label: Sony Music Japan
- Songwriter: Satomi
- Producer: Ryouki Matsumoto

Mika Nakashima singles chronology
"Find the Way" (2003)	"Yuki no Hana" (2003)	"Seven" (2004)

Music video
- "Yuki no Hana" on YouTube

"Yuki no Hana" (Japanese: 雪の華; lit. Snow flower) is a song recorded by Japanese singer Mika Nakashima. It was released on October 1, 2003, via Sony Music Japan as the fifth and final lead single for her second studio album Love (2003), and her 10th single overall. "Yuki no Hana" was distributed in two formats—a standard CD single and was made available digitally.

Written by Satomi with production handled by Ryouki Matsumoto, "Yuki no Hana" utilizes piano and string instrumentations with soft vocal phrasings. Its lyrics refer to snowflakes as "snow flowers", and reflect on happy moments shared by lovers in the winter time. "Yuki no Hana" was met with positive reviews from music critics upon its release, who praised its production as well as Nakashima's vocal delivery.

A commercial success in Japan, it peaked at number three on the weekly Oricon Singles Chart and was multi-certified in various categories, including twice in million. The CD single sold over 240,000 copies by the following month, and is to-date her third best-selling physical single. An accompanying music video was directed by Masashi Muto and depicts Nakashima singing the track in a wintery setting. It has been covered by numerous artists internationally since its release, including Park Hyo-shin, Han Xue, and Vincy Chan.

== Cover versions ==
The song has since been translated and covered a number of times by many artists in several different languages. The song was covered by South Korean male singer Park Hyo-shin and this covered song was inserted in the popular Korean drama I'm Sorry, I Love You. Another Korean version was sung by female singer Seo Young-eun. It was also one of the most popular karaoke songs in Japan in 2004. The song was first covered by Singapore singer Joi Chua in 2005 by the same title "Sorry I Love You". It was also covered by mainland Chinese singer Han Xue in August 2004 in Mandarin; and by Hong Kong singer Vincy Chan in 2006, in Cantonese. In Vietnam, the song was translated and covered in Vietnamese by male singer Minh Vương M4U and female singer Đông Nhi in 2008.

An English version of Yuki no Hana was covered by American singer Eric Martin and featured in his 2008 solo album Mr. Vocalist, which was produced and released in Japan. The German singer Tabea covered the English version snowflower in her album Memories. New Zealand soprano Hayley Westenra also covered the song in English as part of her 2008 album Hayley sings Japanese Songs which debuted at number 12 on the Japanese Albums Chart but broke into the Top 10 in its second week of release. Another covered version was released in June 2006, sung by Japanese male singer Hideaki Tokunaga. An instrumental rock cover was made by Megadeth's former guitarist Marty Friedman, and featured on his 2009 solo album Tokyo Jukebox. In 2016, the song was featured in the anime ReLIFE as the ending theme of its eighth episode.

On December 24, 2018, Jisoo, lead singer of Blackpink, performed a solo rendition of 'Yuki no Hana (雪の華)/Snow Flower' as a Christmas present during the final night of their Arena Tour at the Kyocera Dome, Osaka. On August 23, 2018, Solji, lead singer of EXID, performed a solo rendition of 'Yuki no Hana (雪の華)/Snow Flower' during their first Japan Tour at the Zepp Hall, Tokyo. In 2019, X Japan vocalist, ToshI covered the song as part of his "I'm a Singer Vol. 2" album and the song was also inserted in the Japanese movie "Snow Flower (Yuki no Hana)", where its name was based on the song. On January 8, 2023, South Korean R&B singer-songwriter Maktub released his cover of the song with identical arrangement to the original version.

== Accolades ==
Awards and nominations for "Yuki no Hana"
Year	Organization	Award	Result	Ref.
2003	Japan Record Awards	Excellent Work Award (Gold Award)	Won	
2003	Japan Record Awards	Best Lyricist Award	Won	
2003	Japan Record Awards	Grand Prix	Nominated	
2003	Japan Cable Awards	Excellence Award (Pop)	Won	

== Track listing ==
CD single

1. "Yuki no Hana" (雪の華; Snow Flower) – 5:41
2. "Yuki no Hana" (Acoustic) – 3:37
3. "Yuki no Hana" (Reggae Disco Rockers Flower's Mix) – 6:03
4. "Yuki no Hana" (Instrumental) – 5:38
5. "Yuki no Hana" (English ver.) – 5:40

== Charts ==
=== Weekly charts ===
Chart (2003)	Peak position
Japan Singles (Oricon)	3

Chart (2012)	Peak position
Japan (Japan Hot 100)	77

=== Yearly charts ===
Chart (2003)	Position
Japan Singles (Oricon)	53

== Sales and certifications ==
Region	Certification	Certified units/sales
Japan (RIAJ) Digital single	Million	1,000,000^{*}
Japan (RIAJ) Physical single	Platinum	248,167
Japan (RIAJ) Ringtone	Million	1,000,000^{*}
Japan (RIAJ) Full ringtone	2× Platinum	500,000^{*}
Streaming
Japan (RIAJ)	Platinum	100,000,000^{†}
^{*} Sales figures based on certification alone.^{†} Streaming-only figures based on certification alone.
