= Sakurairo Mau Koro =

Single by Mika Nakashima

from the album Music
- Released: February 2, 2005
- Recorded: 2005
- Genre: J-pop
- Label: Sony
- Songwriter(s): Minako Kawae

Mika Nakashima singles chronology
| "Legend" (2004) | "Sakurairo Mau Koro" (2005) | "Hitori" (2005) |

"Sakurairo Mau Koro" (桜色舞うころ, lit. When the Cherry Blossoms Color Flutters) is a song recorded by Japanese singer Mika Nakashima. This song is a lyrical and heartwarming love song about lovers parting in springtime. Mika uses her extraordinary singing skills, blending her tender vocals with the stirring piano and strings accompaniment. Singer/songwriter Kawae Minako was inspired by Mika's strong presence and wrote the song in a day. The first press of this single included a picture label disc (a picture on the CD).

== Commercial performance ==
This single reached number five on the Oricon Singles Chart and charted for 14 weeks. It sold 105,631 units, making it 97th best-selling single of 2005.

== Track listing ==
All tracks are written by Minako Kawae, arranged by Satoshi Takebe.

CD single
| No. | Title | Length |
|---|---|---|
| 1. | "Sakurairo Mau Koro (桜色舞うころ, lit. When the Cherry Blossoms Color Flutters)" |
| 2. | "Sakurairo Mau Koro" (acoustic) |
| 3. | "Sakurairo Mau Koro" (instrumental) |

== Charts ==
=== Weekly charts ===
| Chart (2005) | Peak position |
|---|---|
| Japan Singles (Oricon) | 5 |

| Chart (2010) | Peak position |
|---|---|
| Japan (Japan Hot 100) | 73 |

=== Year-end charts ===
| Chart (2005) | Position |
|---|---|
| Japan Singles (Oricon) | 97 |

== Sales and certifications ==
| Region | Certification | Certified units/sales |
|---|---|---|
| Japan (RIAJ) Physical | Gold | 106,000 |
| Japan (RIAJ) Digital | Platinum | 250,000^{*} |
| Japan (RIAJ) Chaku-uta | 2× Platinum | 500,000^{*} |
^{*} Sales figures based on certification alone.
